= 2011 Bahraini uprising =

Uprising in Bahrain that started on 14 February 2011

- Part of the Arab Spring, Iran–Saudi Arabia proxy conflict, and the insurgency in Bahrain
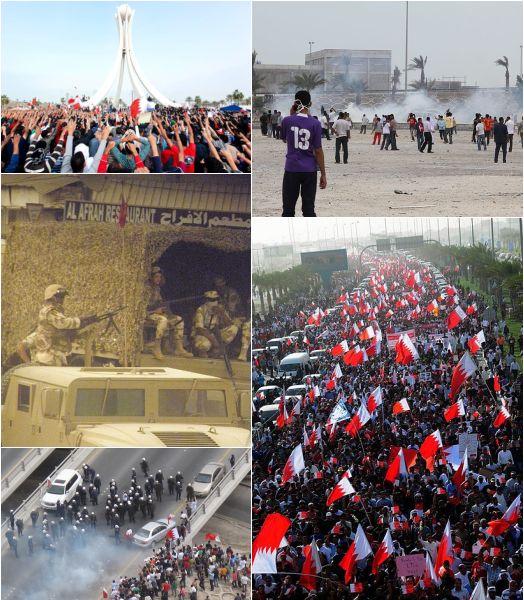
- Clockwise from top-left: Protesters raising their hands towards the Pearl Roundabout on 19 February 2011; Teargas usage by security forces and clashes with protesters on 13 March; Over 100,000 Bahrainis taking part in the "March of loyalty to martyrs", on 22 February; clashes between security forces and protesters on 13 March; Bahraini armed forces blocking an entrance to a Bahraini village.
- Date: 14 February – 18 March 2011 (1 month and 4 days) (occasional demonstrations since 2011)
- Location: Bahrain; 26°01′39″N 50°33′00″E
- Caused by: Inspiration from concurrent regional protests; Institutionalized discrimination towards Shia Muslims; Media censorship and arrests of politicians; Poverty; Saudi Arabian influence in government; Slow pace of democratisation; Authoritarianism; Unemployment; Widespread corruption; Political naturalization
- Goals: Abdication of King Hamad; Constitutional monarchy; Deportation of foreign mercenaries; Drafting of a new constitution; Ending economic and human rights violations; Free and fair elections
- Methods: Civil resistance; Demonstrations; General strikes; Nonviolent revolutions; Riots; Self-immolation
- Status: Decisive Cabinet of Bahrain victory and suppression of the Bahraini opposition.; 2011–2012 Saudi Arabian protests started on 11 March
- Concessions: Establishment of the Bahrain Independent Commission of Inquiry and the national dialogue; 1000 Bahraini dinars (approx. US$2,667) per family; Increased social spending

Parties
(Bahrain) Bahraini opposition Supported by: Iran; Hezbollah; Qatar	Bahrain government Supported by: Gulf Cooperation Council; Saudi Arabia; United Arab Emirates; Kuwait; United Kingdom

Lead figures
Leaders of Bahrain opposition parties 8: Anonymous activists (leaders of the February 14 Youth Coalition); Ali Salman (Secretary General of the Al Wefaq National Islamic Society); Hasan Mushaima (Secretary General of the Haq Movement); Ibrahim Sharif (leader of the National Democratic Action Society); Saeed Shahabi (leader of the Bahrain Freedom Movement); Muħammad ʻAlī al-Mahfoudh (Secretary General of the Islamic Action Society); Abdulwahab Hussain (leader of the Al Wafa' Islamic Movement); Abduljalil al-Singace (Human Rights Bureau and official spokesman of the Haq Movement); Human rights activists 2: Nabeel Rajab (President of the Bahrain Centre for Human Rights); Abdulhadi al-Khawaja (co-founder of the Bahrain Centre for Human Rights); Independent opposition leaders 1: Mohamed Habib al-Miqdad (orator)	(Bahrain) House of Khalifa 8: Hamad bin Isa Al Khalifa (King of Bahrain); Khalifa ibn Salman Al Khalifa (Prime Minister of Bahrain); Khalifa bin Ahmad (Commander-in-Chief of the Bahrain Defense Force); Rashid bin Abdulla Al Khalifa (Interior minister); Mohammed bin Isa Al Khalifa (Commander-in-Chief of the Bahrain National Guard); Adel bin Khalifa bin Hamad Al Fadhel (Director of the National Security Agency); Salman bin Hamad Al Khalifa (Crown prince of Bahrain); Khalid ibn Ahmad Al Khalifah (Foreign minister); 3: (Bahrain) Abdullatif Bin Rashid Al-Zayani (Secretary General of the Gulf Cooperation Council); (Cooperation Council for the Arab States of the Gulf) Mutlaq Bin Salem al-Azima (Commander-in-Chief of the Peninsula Shield Force); (Saudi Arabia) King Abdullah Bin Abdulaziz

Number
150,000^{p. 97} – 300,000 protesters	16,000–36,000 Details: Bahrain Defence Force: 13,000; Bahrain National Guard: 1,500; Unified Military Command: 1,500 List; Saudi Arabia: 1,000; United Arab Emirates: 500; Kuwait: 23 Naval ships; Al Fateh gatherings: 200,000

Casualties and losses
182+ protesters killed; 2,900+ wounded; 2,929+ arrested; 4,539 job layoffs; 534 students expelled; 1,500+ exiled; 900+ stripped of their citizenship	846 policemen injured; 17 killed; Unified Military Command 2 policemen killed; List: Saudi Arabia: 1 policeman killed; United Arab Emirates: 1 policeman killed

The 2011 Bahraini uprising was a series of anti-government protests in Bahrain led by the Shia-dominant and some Sunni minority Bahraini opposition from 2011 until 2014. The protests were inspired by the unrest of the 2011 Arab Spring and protests in Tunisia and Egypt and escalated to daily clashes after the Bahraini government repressed the revolt with the support of the Gulf Cooperation Council's Peninsula Shield Force. The Bahraini protests were a series of demonstrations, amounting to a sustained campaign of non-violent civil disobedience and some violent resistance in the Persian Gulf country of Bahrain. As part of the revolutionary wave of protests in the Middle East and North Africa following the self-immolation of Mohamed Bouazizi in Tunisia, the Bahraini protests were initially aimed at achieving greater political freedom and equality for the 70% Shia population.

This expanded to a call to end the monarchy of Hamad bin Isa Al Khalifa following a deadly night raid on 17 February 2011 against protesters at the Pearl Roundabout in the capital Manama, known locally as Bloody Thursday. Protesters in Manama camped for days at the Pearl Roundabout, which became the centre of the protests. After a month, the government of Bahrain requested troops and police aid from the Gulf Cooperation Council. On 14 March, 1,000 troops from Saudi Arabia, 500 troops from the United Arab Emirates and naval ships from Kuwait entered Bahrain and crushed the uprising. A day later, King Hamad declared martial law and a three-month state of emergency. Pearl Roundabout was cleared of protesters and the iconic statue at its center was demolished.

Occasional demonstrations have continued since. After the state of emergency was lifted on 1 June 2011, the opposition party, Al Wefaq National Islamic Society, organized several weekly protests usually attended by tens of thousands. On 9 March 2012, over 100,000 attended and another on 31 August attracted tens of thousands. Daily smaller-scale protests and clashes continued, mostly outside Manama's business districts. By April 2012, more than 80 had died. The police response was described as a "brutal" crackdown on "peaceful and unarmed" protesters, including doctors and bloggers. The police carried out midnight house raids in Shia neighbourhoods, beatings at checkpoints and denial of medical care in a campaign of intimidation. More than 2,929 people have been arrested, and at least five died due to torture in police custody.

In early July 2013, Bahraini activists called for major rallies on 14 August under the title Bahrain Tamarod.

== Naming ==
The Bahraini uprising is also known as the 14 February uprising and Pearl uprising.

== Background ==
The roots of the uprising date back to the beginning of the 20th century. Bahrainis have protested sporadically throughout the last decades demanding social, economic and political rights. Demonstrations were present as early as the 1920s and the first municipal elections to fill half the seats on local councils was held in 1926.

=== History ===
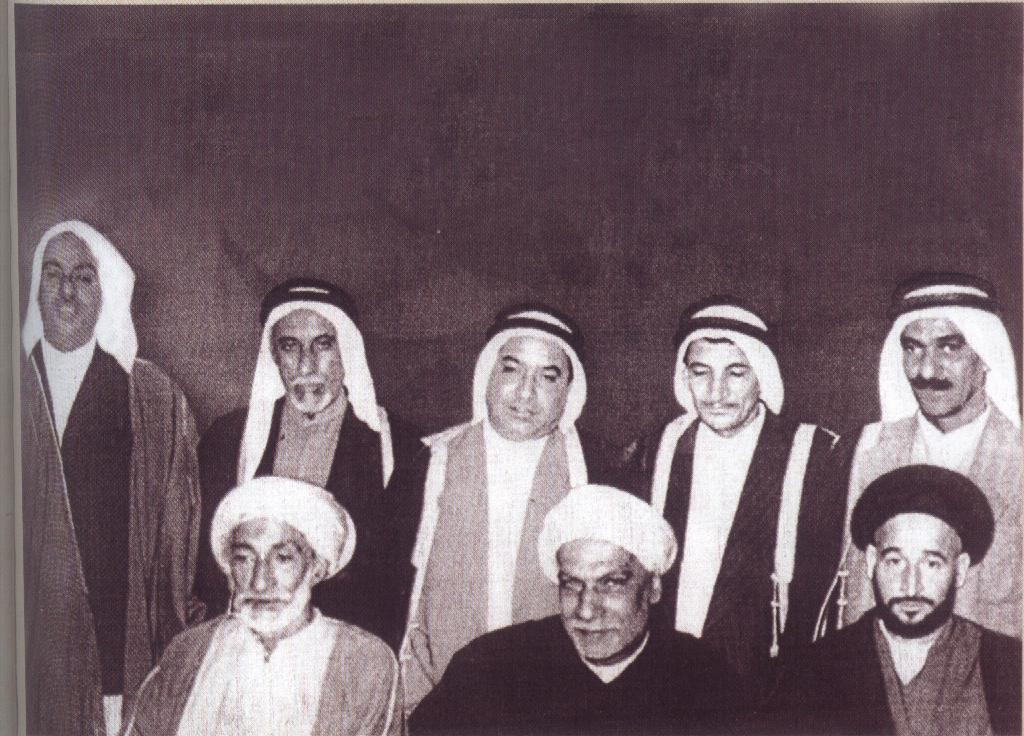
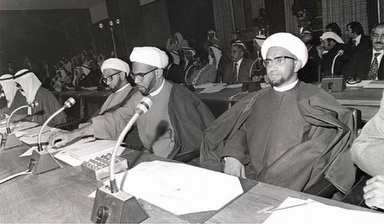
Left to right: The National Union Committee in 1954 and the religious block in 1973 Parliament

The country has been ruled by the House of Khalifa since the Bani Utbah invasion of Bahrain in 1783, and was a British protectorate for most of the 20th century. In 1926, Charles Belgrave, a British national operating as an adviser to the ruler, became the de facto ruler and oversaw the transition to a "modern" state. The National Union Committee (NUC) formed in 1954 was the earliest serious challenge to the status quo. Two year after its formation, NUC leaders were imprisoned and deported by authorities.

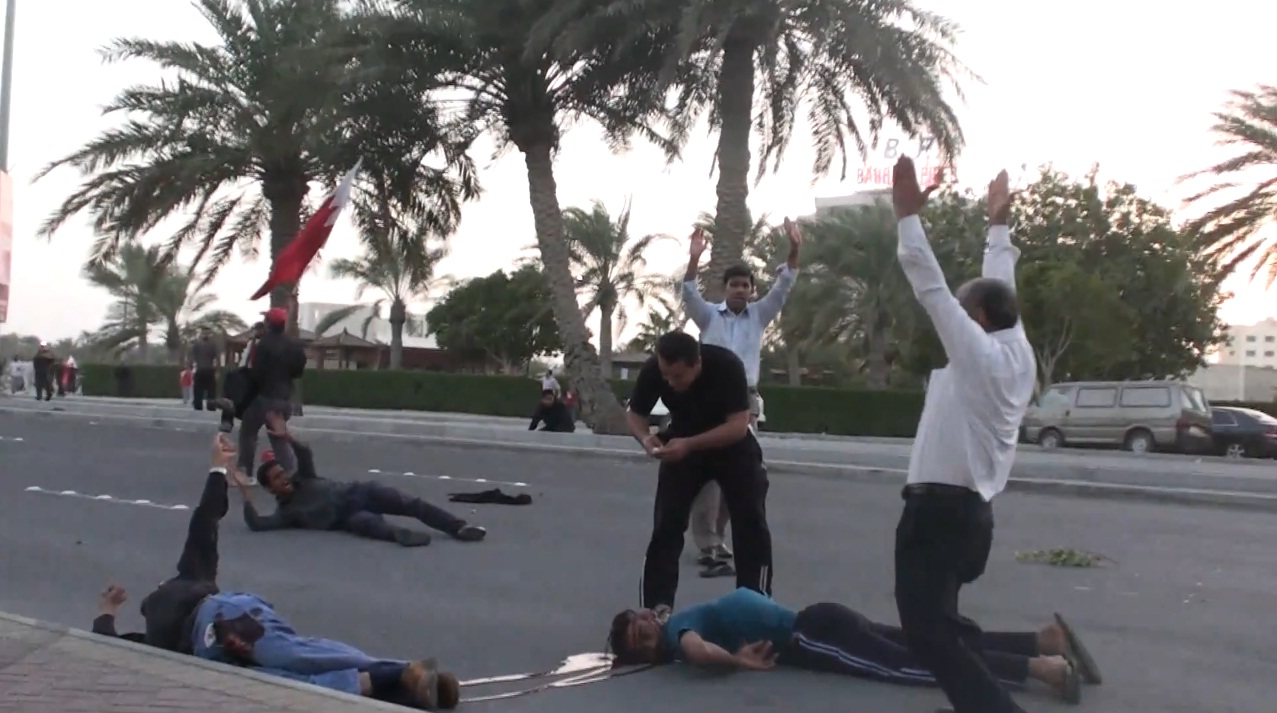
Bahraini protesters shot by military, 18 February 2011

In 1965, the one-month March Intifada uprising by oil workers was crushed. The following year a new British adviser was appointed, Ian Henderson, who was known for allegedly ordering torture and assassinations in Kenya. He was tasked with heading and developing the General Directorate for State Security Investigations.

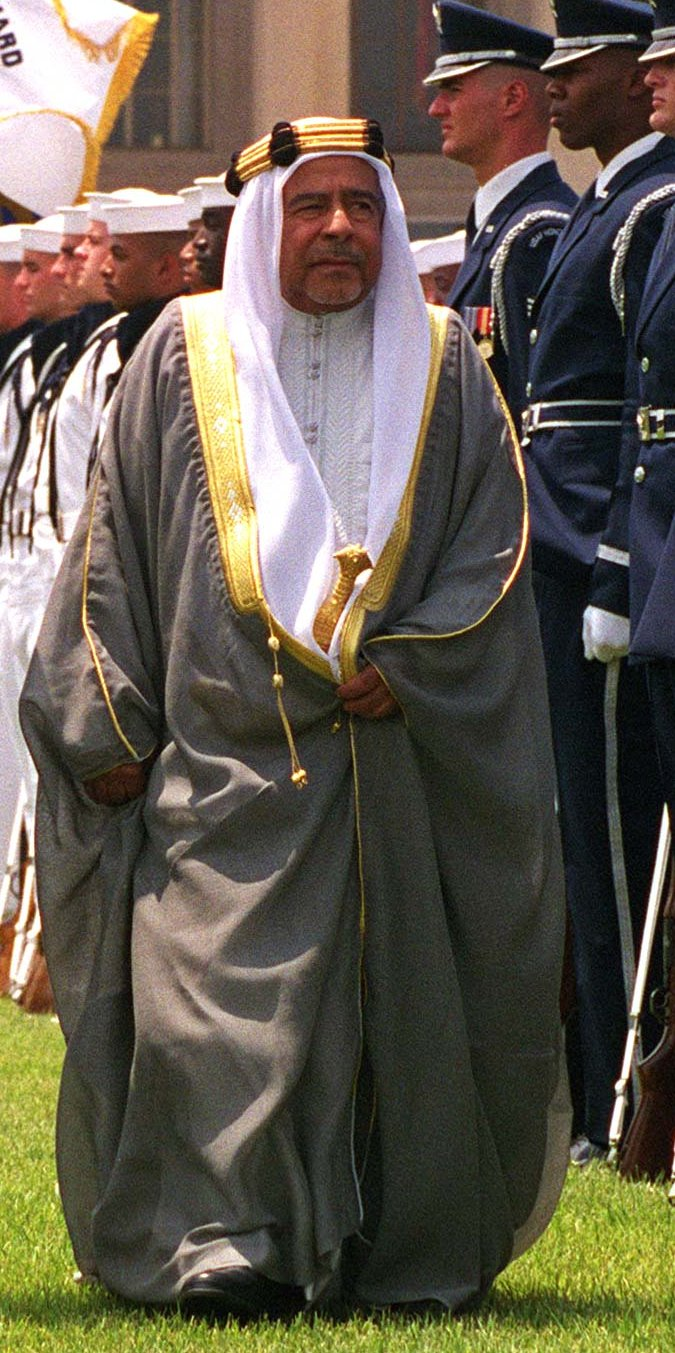
The late Emir, Isa bin Salman Al Khalifa dissolved the parliament and suspended the constitution in 1975.

In 1971, Bahrain became an independent state, and in 1973 the country held its first parliamentary election. However, only two years after the end of British rule, the constitution was suspended and the assembly dissolved by the Isa bin Salman Al Khalifa, the Emir at the time. Human rights deteriorated in the period between 1975 and 2001, accompanied by increased repression. The 1981 Bahraini coup d'état attempt failed.

In 1992, 280 society leaders demanded the return of the parliament and constitution, which the government rejected. Two years later the 1990s uprising in Bahrain began. Throughout the uprising large demonstrations and acts of violence occurred. Over forty people were killed, including several detainees whilst in police custody, and at least three policemen.

In 1999, Hamad bin Isa Al Khalifa succeeded his father. He successfully ended the uprising in 2001 after introducing the wide-ranging National Action Charter of Bahrain reforms, which 98.4 percent of Bahrainis voted in favour of in a nationwide referendum. The following year, Bahraini opposition "felt betrayed" after the government issued a unilateral new constitution. Despite earlier promises, the appointed Consultative Council, the upper house, of the National Assembly of Bahrain, was given more powers than the elected Council of Representatives, the lower house. The Emir became a king with wide executive authority.

Four opposition parties boycotted the 2002 parliamentary election, however in the 2006 election one of them, Al Wefaq, won a plurality. The participation in elections increased the split between opposition associations. The Haq Movement was founded and utilized street protests to seek change instead of bringing change within the parliament.

The period between 2007 and 2010 saw sporadic protests which were followed by large arrests. Since then, tensions have increased "dangerously".

=== Human rights ===
The state of human rights in Bahrain was criticized in the period between 1975 and 2001. The government had committed wide range violations including systematic torture. Following reforms in 2001, human rights improved significantly and were praised by Amnesty International. They allegedly began deteriorating again at the end of 2007 when torture and repression tactics were being used again. By 2010, torture had become common and Bahrain's human rights record was described as "dismal" by Human Rights Watch. The Shia majority have long complained of what they call systemic discrimination. They accuse the government of naturalizing Sunnis from neighbouring countries and gerrymandering electoral districts.

In 2006, the Al Bandar report revealed a political conspiracy by government officials in Bahrain to foment sectarian strife and marginalize the majority Shia community in the country.

=== Economy ===
Bahrain is relatively poor when compared to its oil-rich Persian Gulf neighbours; its oil has "virtually dried up" and it depends on international banking and the tourism sector. Bahrain's unemployment rate is among the highest in the region. Extreme poverty does not exist in Bahrain where the average daily income is US$12.8; however, 11 percent of citizens suffer from relative poverty.

=== Foreign relations ===
Bahrain hosts the United States Naval Support Activity Bahrain, the home of the US Fifth Fleet; the US Department of Defense considers the location critical to its attempts to counter Iranian military power in the region. The Saudi Arabian government and other Gulf region governments strongly support the King of Bahrain. Although government officials and media often accuse the opposition of being influenced by Iran, a government-appointed commission found no evidence supporting the claim. Iran has historically claimed Bahrain as a province, but the claim was dropped after a United Nations survey in 1970 found that most Bahraini people preferred independence over Iranian control.

== Lead-up to the protests ==
Inspired by the successful uprisings in Egypt and Tunisia, opposition activists starting from January 2011 filled the social media websites Facebook and Twitter as well as online forums, e-mails and text messages with calls to stage major pro-democracy protests. Bahraini youths described their plans as an appeal for Bahrainis "to take to the streets on Monday 14 February in a peaceful and orderly manner in order to rewrite the constitution and to establish a body with a full popular mandate".

The day had a symbolic value as it was the tenth anniversary of a referendum in favor of the National Action Charter and the ninth anniversary of the Constitution of 2002. Unregistered opposition parties such as the Haq Movement and Bahrain Freedom Movement supported the plans, while the National Democratic Action Society only announced its support for "the principle of the right of the youth to demonstrate peacefully" one day before the protests. Other opposition groups including Al Wefaq, Bahrain's main opposition party, did not explicitly call for or support protests; however its leader Ali Salman demanded political reforms.

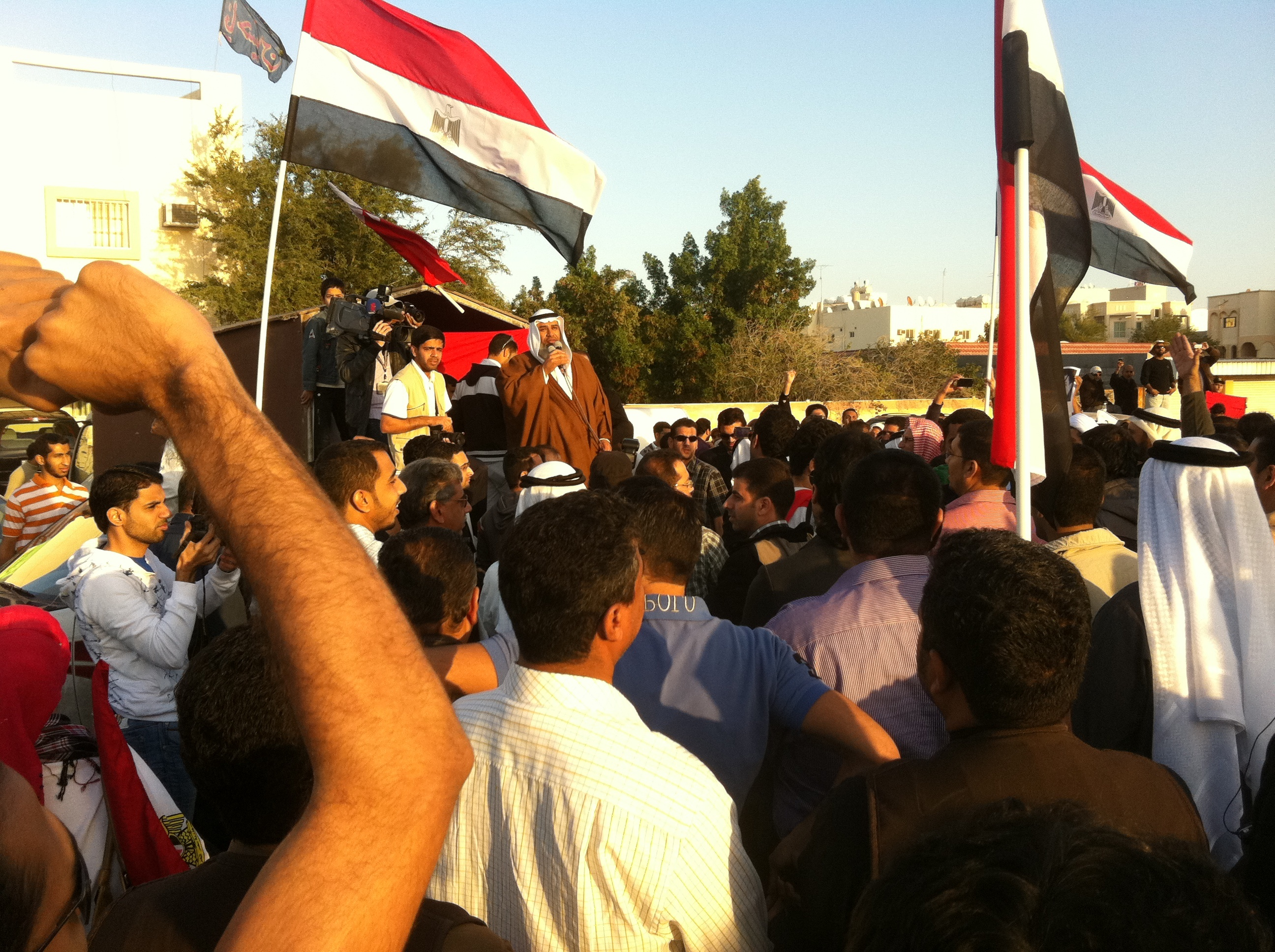
Bahrainis expressing solidarity with the 2011 Egyptian revolution on 4 February.

A few weeks before the protests, the government made a number of concessions such as offering to free some of the children arrested in the August crackdown and increased social spending. On 4 February, several hundred Bahrainis gathered in front of the Egyptian embassy in Manama to express solidarity with anti-government protesters there. On 11 February, at the Khutbah preceding Friday prayer, Shiekh Isa Qassim said "the winds of change in the Arab world [are] unstoppable". He demanded to end torture and discrimination, release political activists and rewrite the constitution. Appearing on the state media, King Hamad announced that each family will be given 1,000 Bahraini dinars ($2,650) to celebrate the tenth anniversary of the National Action Charter referendum. Agence France-Presse linked payments to the 14 February demonstration plans.

The next day, Bahrain Centre for Human Rights sent an open letter to the king urging him to avoid a "worst-case scenario". On 13 February, authorities increased the presence of security forces in key locations such as shopping malls and set up a number of checkpoints. Al Jazeera interpreted the move as "a clear warning against holding Monday's [14 February] rally". At night, police attacked a small group of youth who organized a protest in Karzakan after a wedding ceremony. Small protests and clashes occurred in other locations as well, such as Diraz, Sitra, Bani Jamra and Tashan leading to minor injuries to both sides.

== Timeline ==
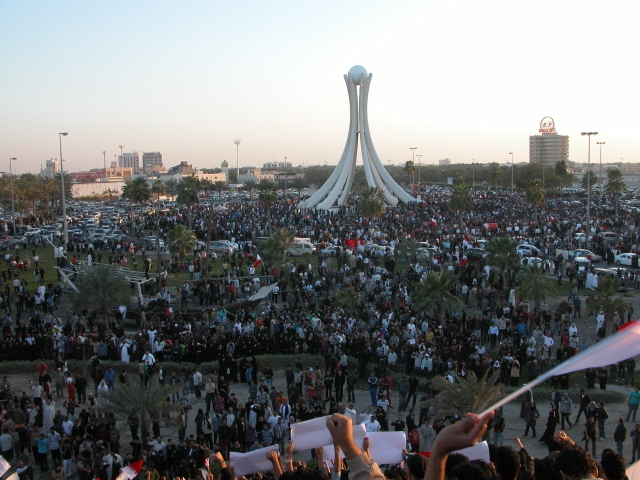
Protesters gather at the Pearl Roundabout for the first time on 15 February 2011.

Protests began on 14 February 2011, but met immediate reaction from security forces. Over thirty protesters were reportedly injured and one was killed as Bahraini government forces used tear gas, rubber bullets and birdshot to break up demonstrations, but protests continued into the evening, drawing several hundred participants. Most of the protesters were Shia Muslims, who make up the majority of Bahrain's population. The next day, one person attending the funeral of the protester killed on 14 February was shot dead and 25 more were hurt when security officers opened fire on mourners. The same day, thousands of protesters marched to the Pearl Roundabout in Manama and occupied it, setting up protest tents and camping out overnight. Sunni activist Mohamed Albuflasa was secretly arrested by security forces after addressing the crowd, making him the first political prisoner of the uprising.

In the early morning of 17 February, security forces retook control of the roundabout, killing four protesters and injuring over 300 in the process. Manama was subsequently placed under lockdown, with tanks and armed soldiers taking up positions around the capital city. In response, Al Wefaq MPs, then the largest bloc, submitted their resignations from the lower house of the National Assembly of Bahrain. The next morning over 50,000 took part in the funerals of victims. In the afternoon, hundreds of them marched to Manama. When they neared the Pearl Roundabout, the army opened fire injuring dozens and fatally wounding one. Troops withdrew from the Pearl Roundabout on 19 February, and protesters reestablished their camps there. The crown prince assured protesters that they would be allowed to camp at the roundabout.

Subsequent days saw large demonstrations; on 21 February, a pro-government "Gathering of National Unity" drew tens of thousands, while on 22 February the number of protesters at the Pearl Roundabout peaked at over 150,000 after more than 100,000 protesters marched there. On 25 February, a national day of mourning was announced and large anti-government marches were staged. Participants were twice as much as those in the 22 February march, estimated at about 40% of Bahraini citizens. Three days later hundreds protested outside parliament demanding the resignation of all MPs. As protests intensified toward the end of the month, King Hamad was forced to offer concessions in the form of the release of political prisoners and the dismissal of three government ministers.

Protests continued into March, with the opposition expressing dissatisfaction with the government's response. A counter-demonstration on 2 March was staged, reportedly the largest political gathering in Bahrain's history in support of the government. The next day, two were reportedly injured in clashed between naturalized Sunnis and local Shia youths in Hamad Town, and police deployed tear gas to break up the clashes. Tens of thousands staged two protests the following day, one in Manama and the other headed to state TV accusing it of reinforcing sectarian divides. Protesters escalated their calls for the removal of Prime Minister Khalifa bin Salman Al Khalifa, in power since 1971, from office, gathering outside his office on 6 March.

The next day three protests were staged; the first near the US embassy, the second outside the Ministry of Interior building and the third and longest in front of Bahrain Financial Harbour. On 8 March, three hard-line Shia groups called for the abdication of the monarchy and the establishment of a democratic republic via peaceful means, while the larger Al Wefaq group continued demanding an elected government and a constitutional monarchy. On 9 March, thousands protested near Manama's immigration office against naturalizing foreigners and recruiting them in security forces.

Hard-liners escalated their moves staging a protest headed to the Royal Court in Riffa on 11 March. Thousands carrying flowers and flags participated, but were blocked by riot police. During the same day, tens of thousands participated in a march in Manama organized by Al Wefaq. The following day, tens of thousands of protesters encircled another royal palace and unlike the previous day, the protest ended peacefully. The same day, U.S. Defense Secretary Robert Gates was conducting a visit to the country.

On 13 March, the government reacted strongly, with riot police firing tear gas canisters and tearing down protest tents in the Pearl Roundabout and using tear gas and rubber bullets to disperse demonstrators in the financial district, where they had been camping for over a week. Witnesses reported that riot police were encircling Pearl Roundabout, the focal point of the protest movement, but the Ministry of Interior said they were aiming to the open the highway and asked protesters to "remain in the [Pearl] roundabout for their safety". Thousands of protesters clashed with police forcing them to retreat.

Meanwhile, 150 government supporters stormed the University of Bahrain where about 5,000 students were staging an anti-government protest. Clashes occurred between the two groups using sharp objects and stones. Riot police intervened by firing tear gas, rubber bullets and sound bombs on opposition protesters. During the day, the General Federation of Workers Trade Unions in Bahrain called for a general strike and the crown prince announced a statement outlining seven principles to be discussed in the political dialogue, including "a parliament with full authority" and "a government that represents the will of the people".

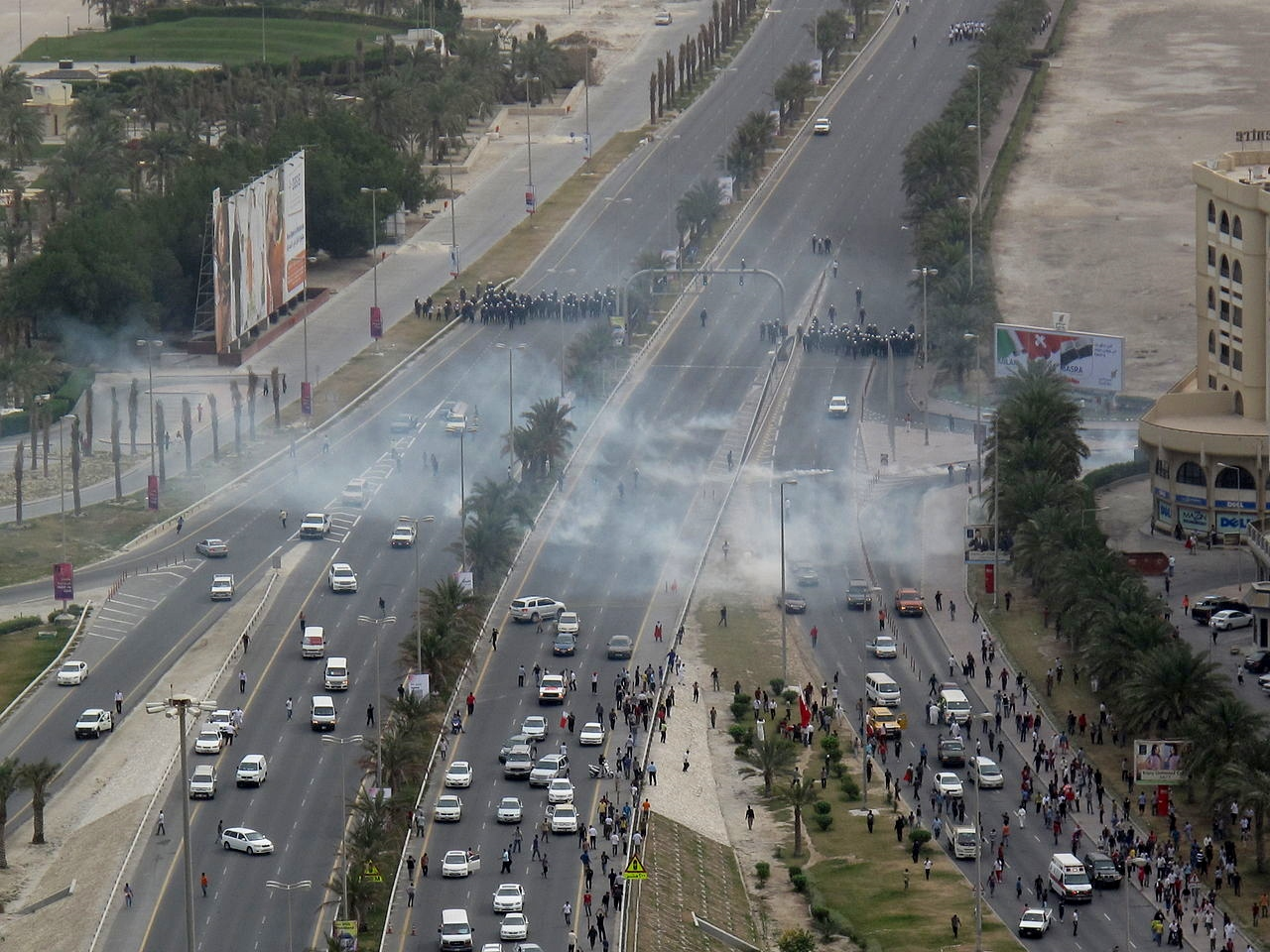
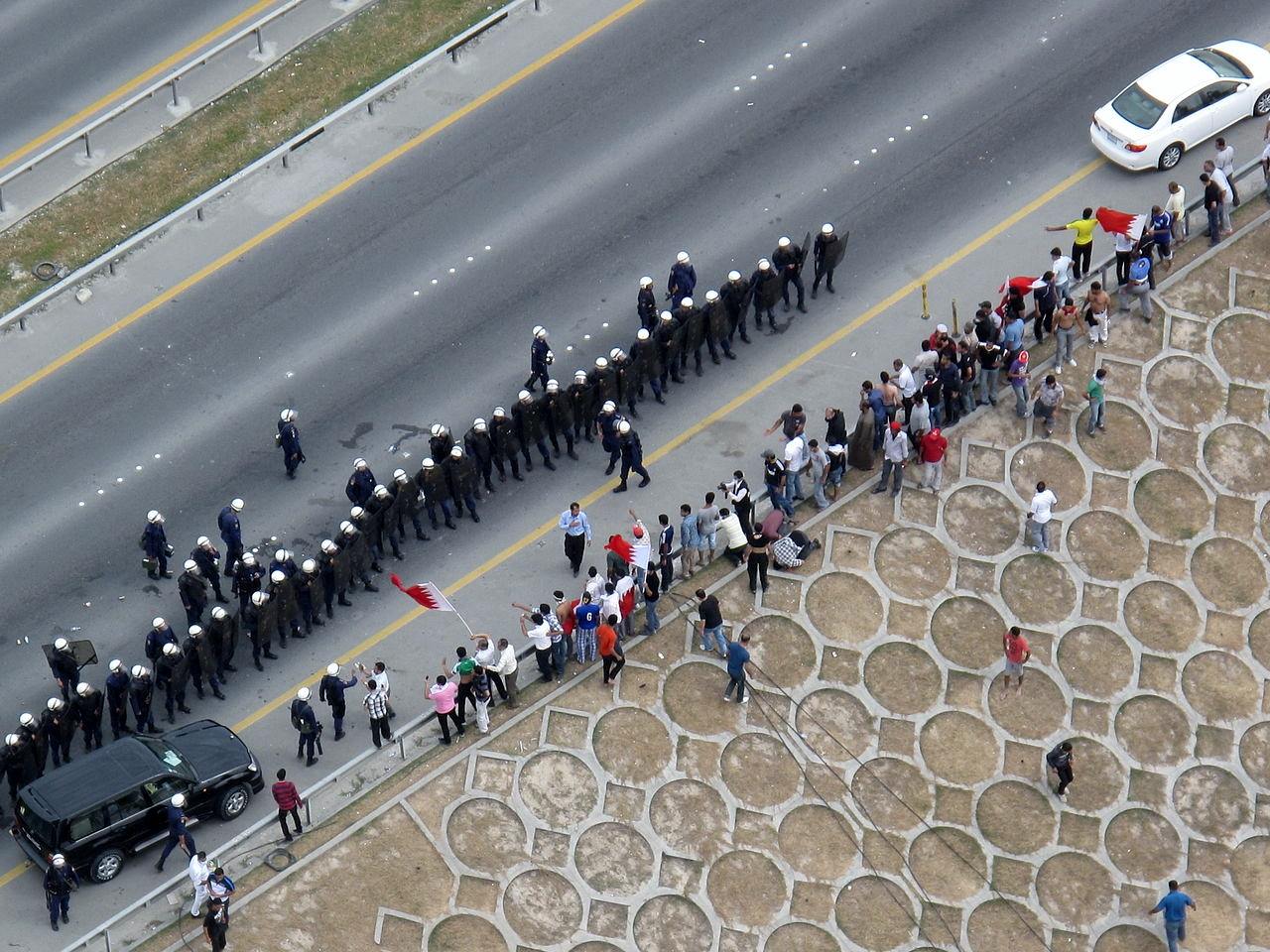
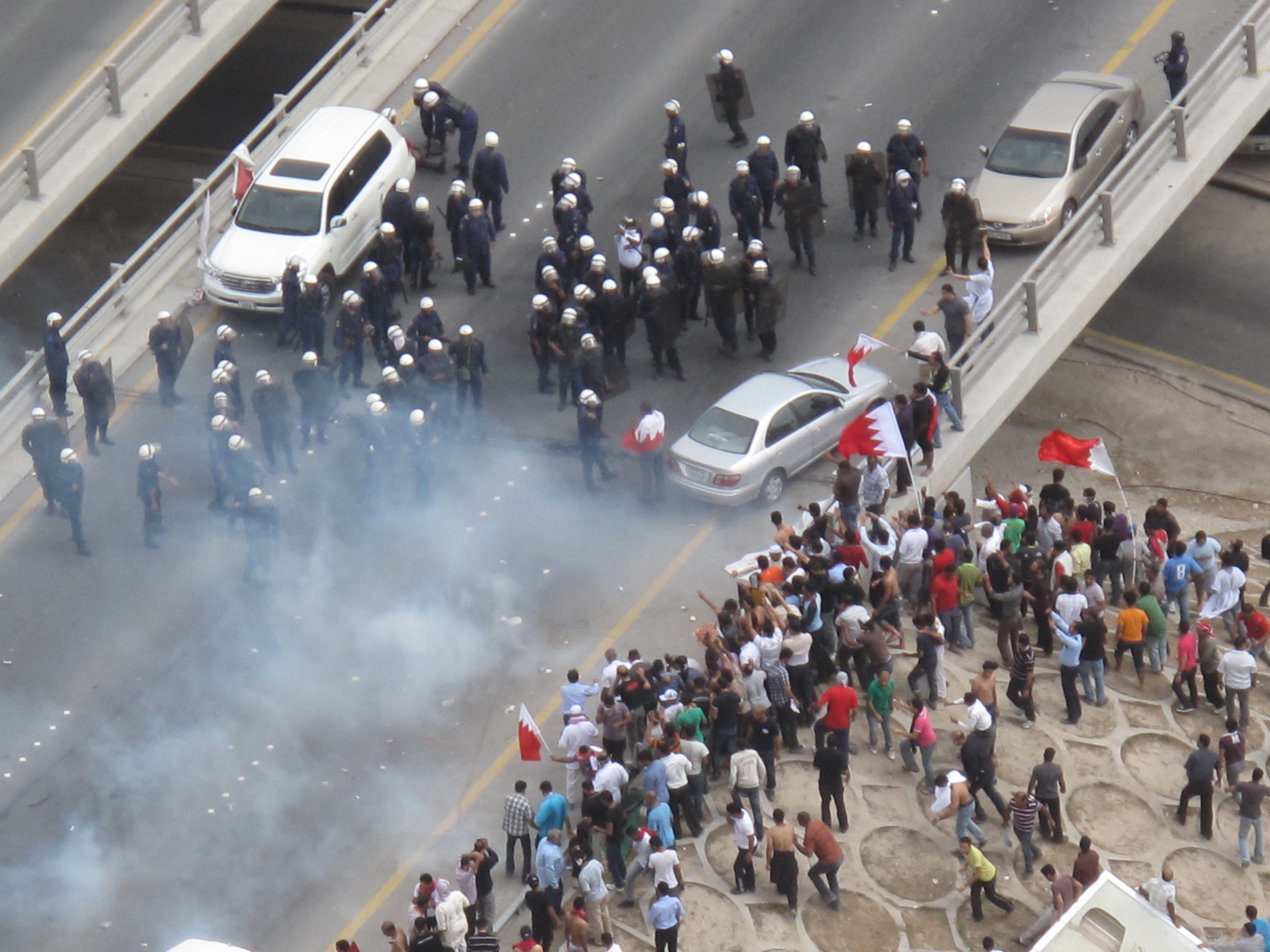
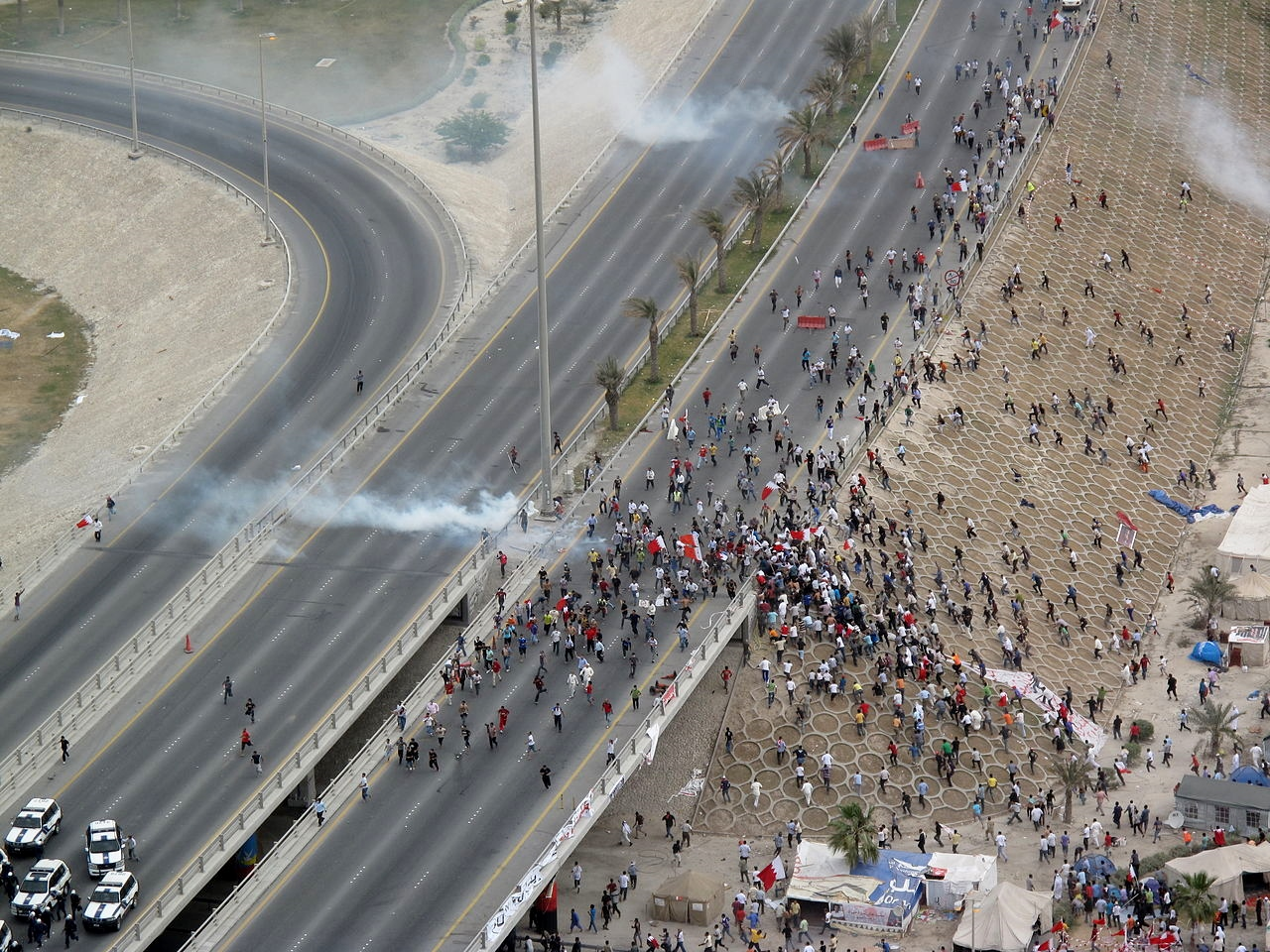
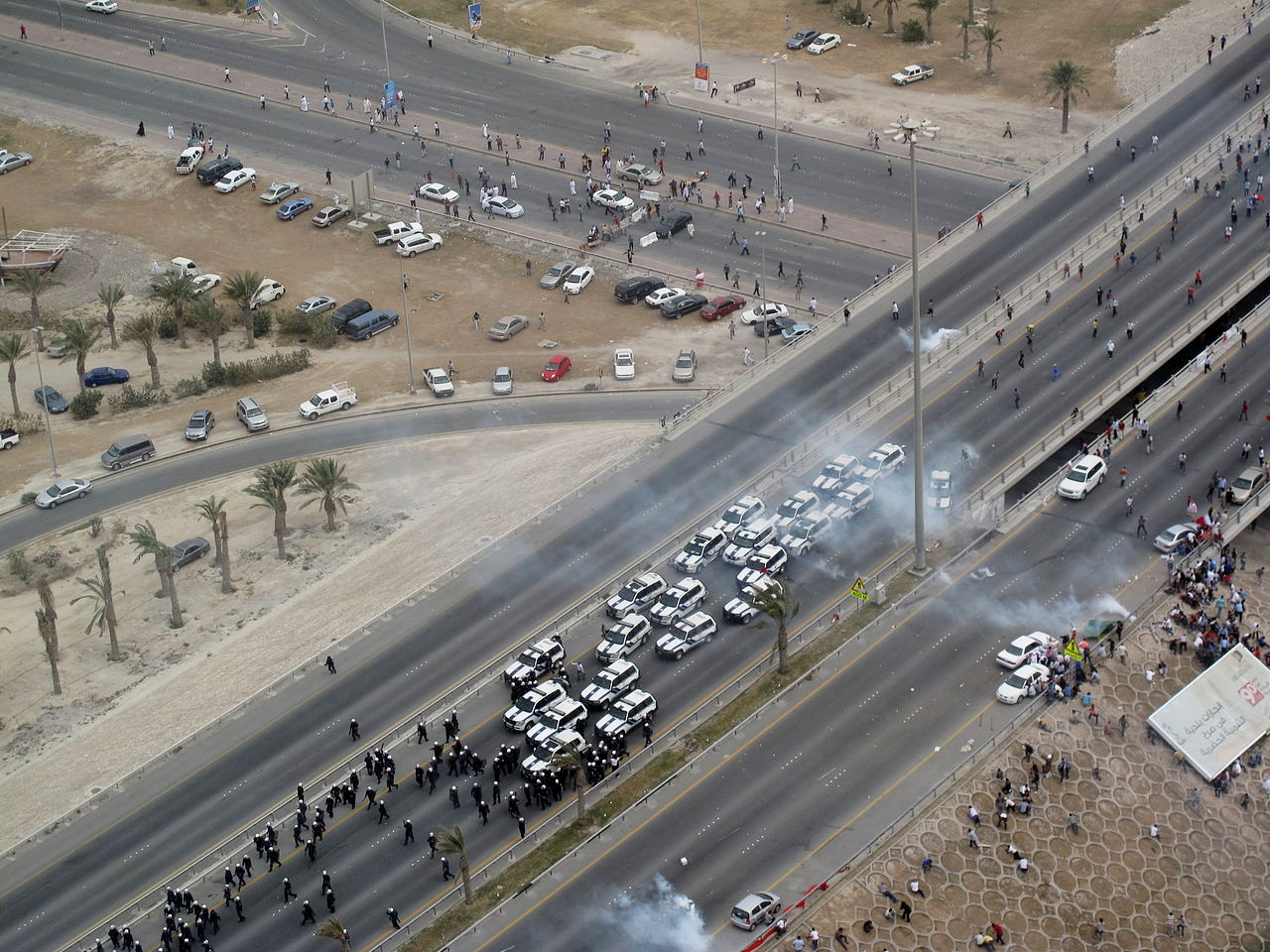
Riot police and protesters clashing violently in Manama on 13 March

As police were overwhelmed by protesters who also blocked roads, the government of Bahrain requested help from neighbouring countries. On 14 March, the Gulf Cooperation Council (GCC) agreed to deploy Peninsula Shield Force troops to Bahrain. Saudi Arabia deployed about 1,000 troops with armoured support, and the United Arab Emirates deployed about 500 police officers. The forces crossed into Bahrain via the King Fahd Causeway. The purported reason of the intervention was to secure key installations. According to the BBC, "The Saudis took up positions at key installations but never intervened directly in policing the demonstrators", though warned that they would deal with the protesters if Bahrain did not. The intervention marked the first time an Arab government requested foreign help during the Arab Spring. The opposition reacted strongly, calling it an occupation and a declaration of war, and pleaded for international help.

=== State of emergency ===
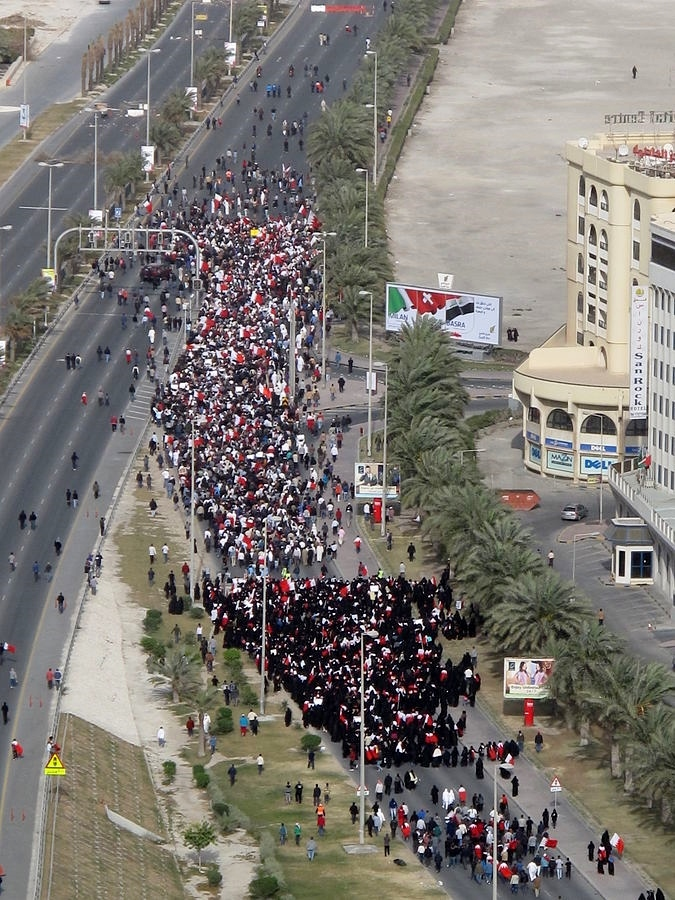
Thousands of protesters denouncing the Saudi intervention in a march to the Saudi embassy in Manama on 15 March

On 15 March, King Hamad declared a three-month state of emergency. Thousands of protesters marched to the Saudi embassy in Manama denouncing the GCC intervention, while clashes between security officers using shotgun and demonstrators took place in various locations. The most violent were on Sitra island stretching throughout morning till afternoon resulting in two deaths and over 200 injuries among protesters and one death among police. Doctors at the Salmaniya Medical Complex said it was overwhelmed with injured and that some had bullet wounds. Jeffrey D. Feltman, then the US Assistant Secretary of State for Near Eastern Affairs was sent to Bahrain to mediate between the two sides. Opposition parties said they accepted the US initiative while the government did not respond.

16 March crackdown

In the early morning of 16 March, over 5,000 security forces backed by tanks and helicopters stormed the Pearl Roundabout, where protesters had camped for about a month. The number of protesters was much lower than that in previous days due to many of them returning to villages to protect their homes. Intimidated by the amount of security forces, most protesters retreated from the location, while others decided to stay and were violently cleared within two hours. Then, security forces cleared road blockades and the financial harbor, and moved to take control over Salmaniya hospital. They entered the hospital building with their sticks, shields, handguns and assault rifles after clearing the parking area, and treated it as a crime scene.

Witnesses said ambulances were captured inside the hospital and some health workers were beaten. Unable to reach Salmaniya hospital, the wounded were taken to small clinics outside the capital, which were stormed by police soon after, prompting protesters to use mosques as field clinics. Then, the army moved to opposition strongholds where it set up a number of checkpoints and thousands of riot police entered, forcing people to retreat to their homes by nightfall. The Al Wefaq party advised people to stay off the streets, avoid confrontations with security forces and stay peaceful after the army had announced a nighttime 12-hour curfew in Manama and banned all sorts of public gatherings. Eight people had died that day, five by gunshot, one by birdshot and two police reportedly run over by an SUV.

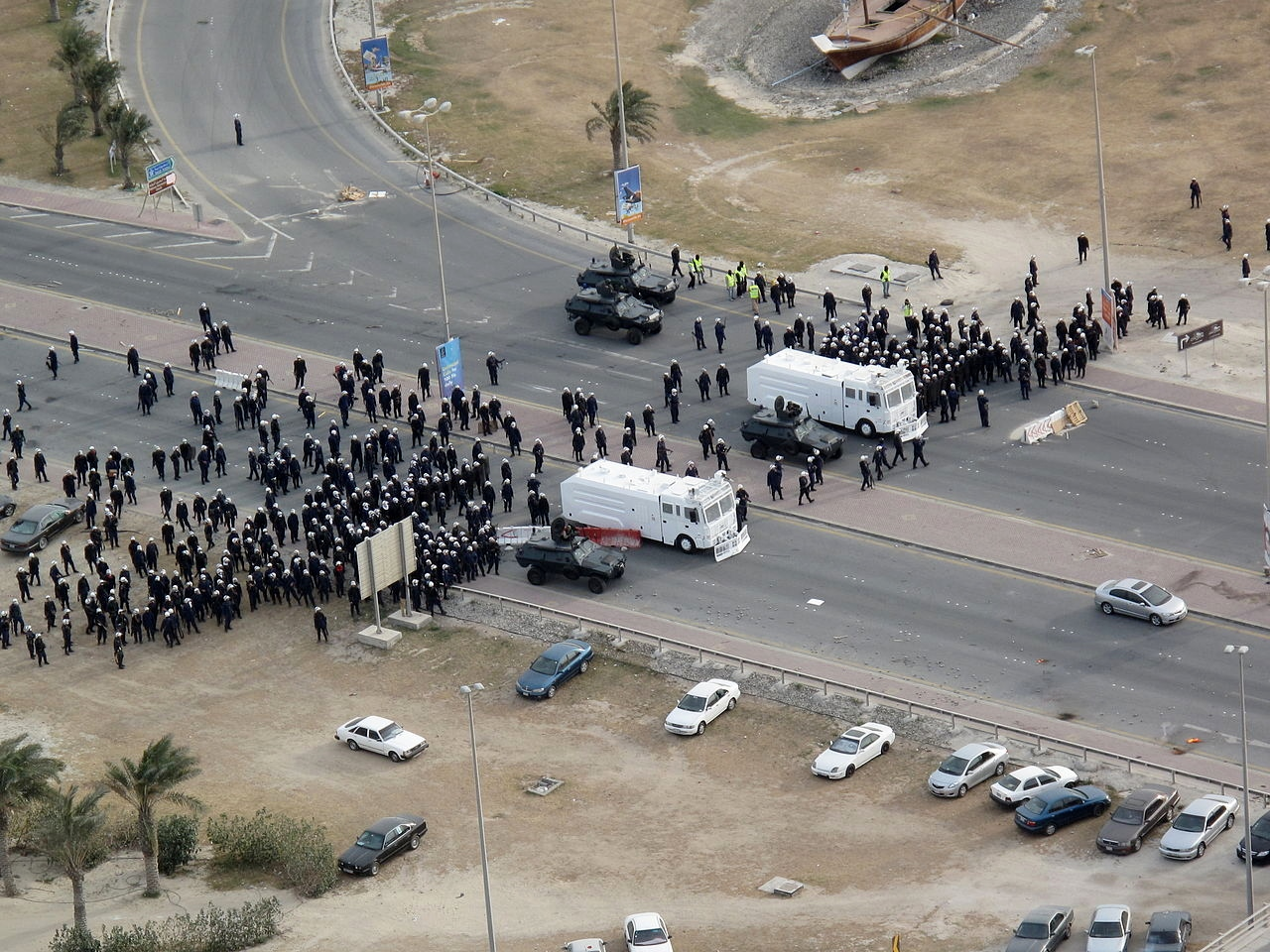
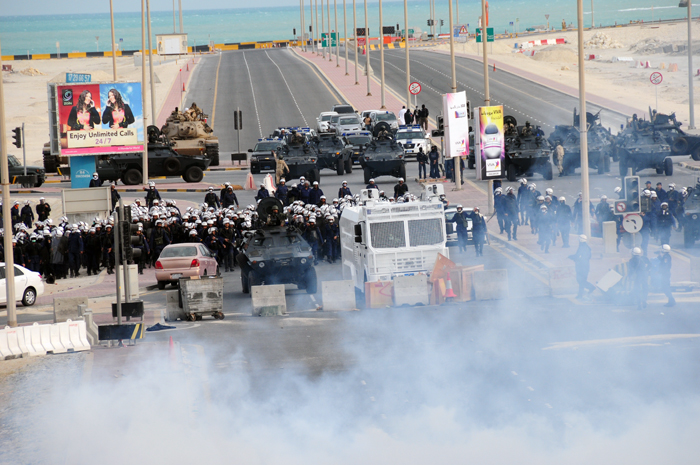
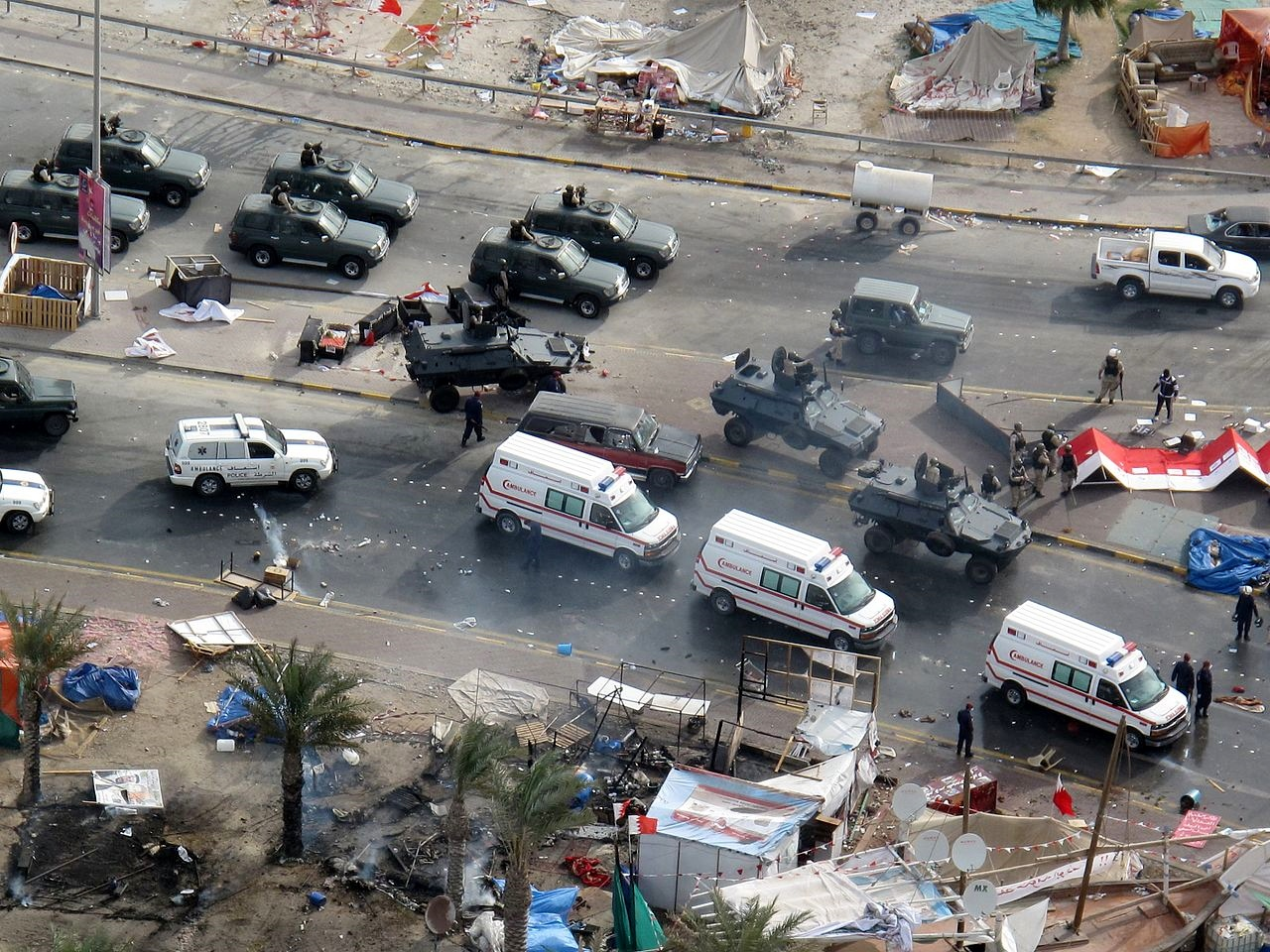
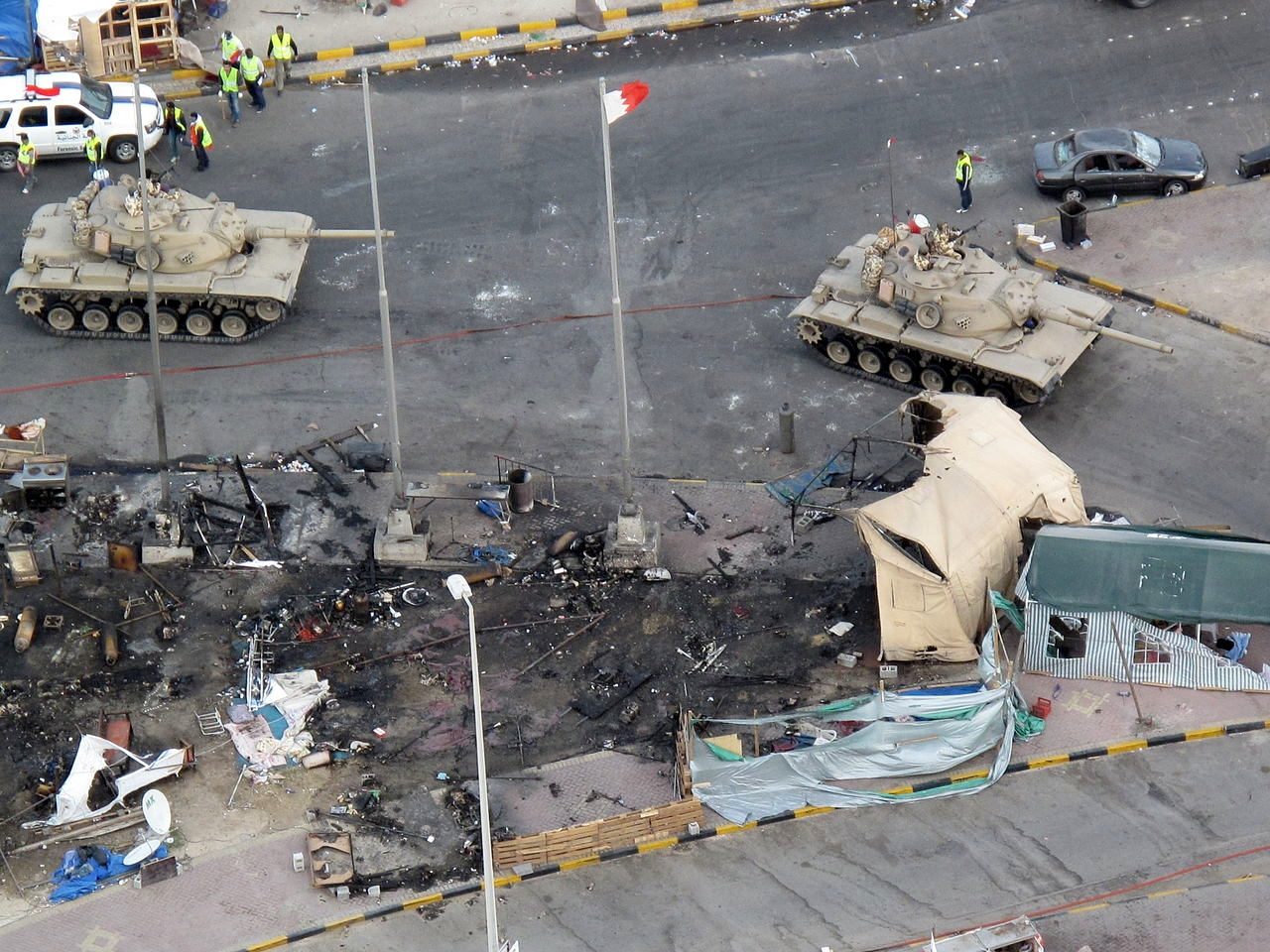
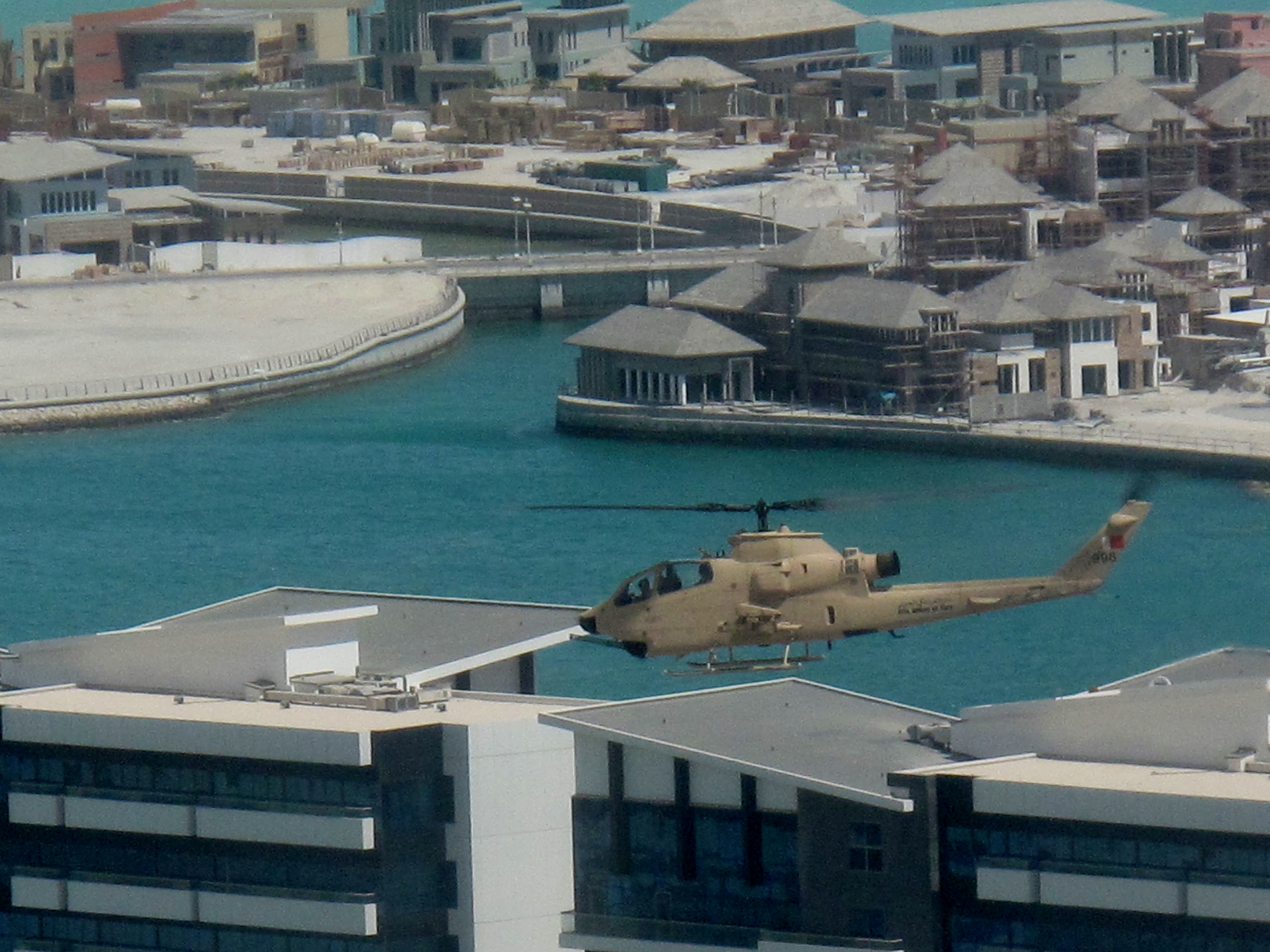
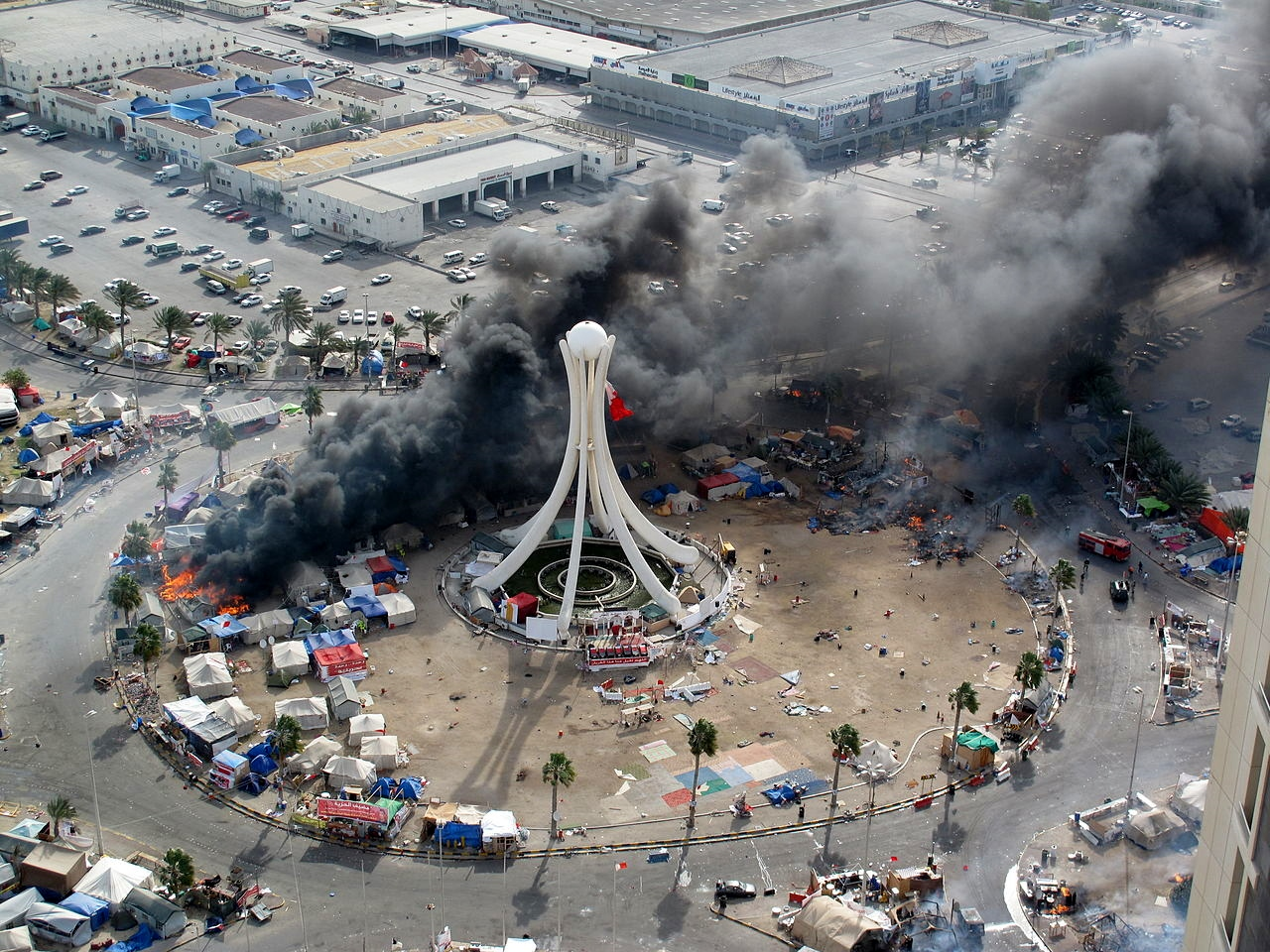
Riot police and army forces supported by armoured vehicles and a military helicopter storm Pearl Roundabout on 16 March

Arrests and widening crackdown

By the early hours of 17 March, over 1,000 protesters had been arrested, including seven leading opposition figures, among them Abduljalil al-Singace, Abdulwahab Hussain, Ibrahim Sharif and Hasan Mushaima. In an interview with Al Jazeera before his arrest, the latter had claimed protesters were gunned down despite offering only non-violent civil resistance. In response to the government's reaction to the protests, a number of top Shia officials submitted their resignations, including two ministers, four appointed MPs and a dozen judges. Protesters in several villages ignored the curfew and gathered in streets only to be dispersed by security forces, which allowed funerals as the only means of public gathering. Arrested protesters were taken to police stations where they were mistreated and verbally abused.

Later in the day, surgeon Ali al-Ekri was arrested from the still surrounded Salmaniya hospital and by April another 47 health workers had been arrested. Their case drew wide international attention. Patients at the hospital reported getting beaten and verbally abused by security forces and staff said patients with protest related injuries were kept in wards 62 and 63 where they were held as captives, denied health care and beaten on daily basis to secure confessions. Physicians for Human Rights accused the government of violating medical neutrality and Médecins Sans Frontières said injured protesters were denied medical care and that hospitals were used as baits to snare them. The government of Bahrain dismissed these reports as lacking any evidence and said forces were only deployed in the hospital to keep order.

A cement column falling on a construction vehicle killing its driver during demolition process of Pearl Roundabout on 18 March

On 18 March, the Pearl Monument in the middle of the Pearl Roundabout was demolished on government orders and a worker died in process. The government said the demolition was in order to erase "bad memories" and "boost flow of traffic", but the site remained cordoned by security forces. Security checkpoints set up throughout the country were used to beat and arrest those perceived to be anti-government, among them was Fadhila Mubarak arrested on 20 March due to listening to 'revolutionary' music. On 22 March, the General trade union supported by Al Wefaq suspended the general strike after it had announced extending it indefinitely two days previously. Meanwhile, over a thousand mourners took part in funeral of a woman killed in crackdown in Manama and human rights activists reported that night raids on dissent activists had continued.

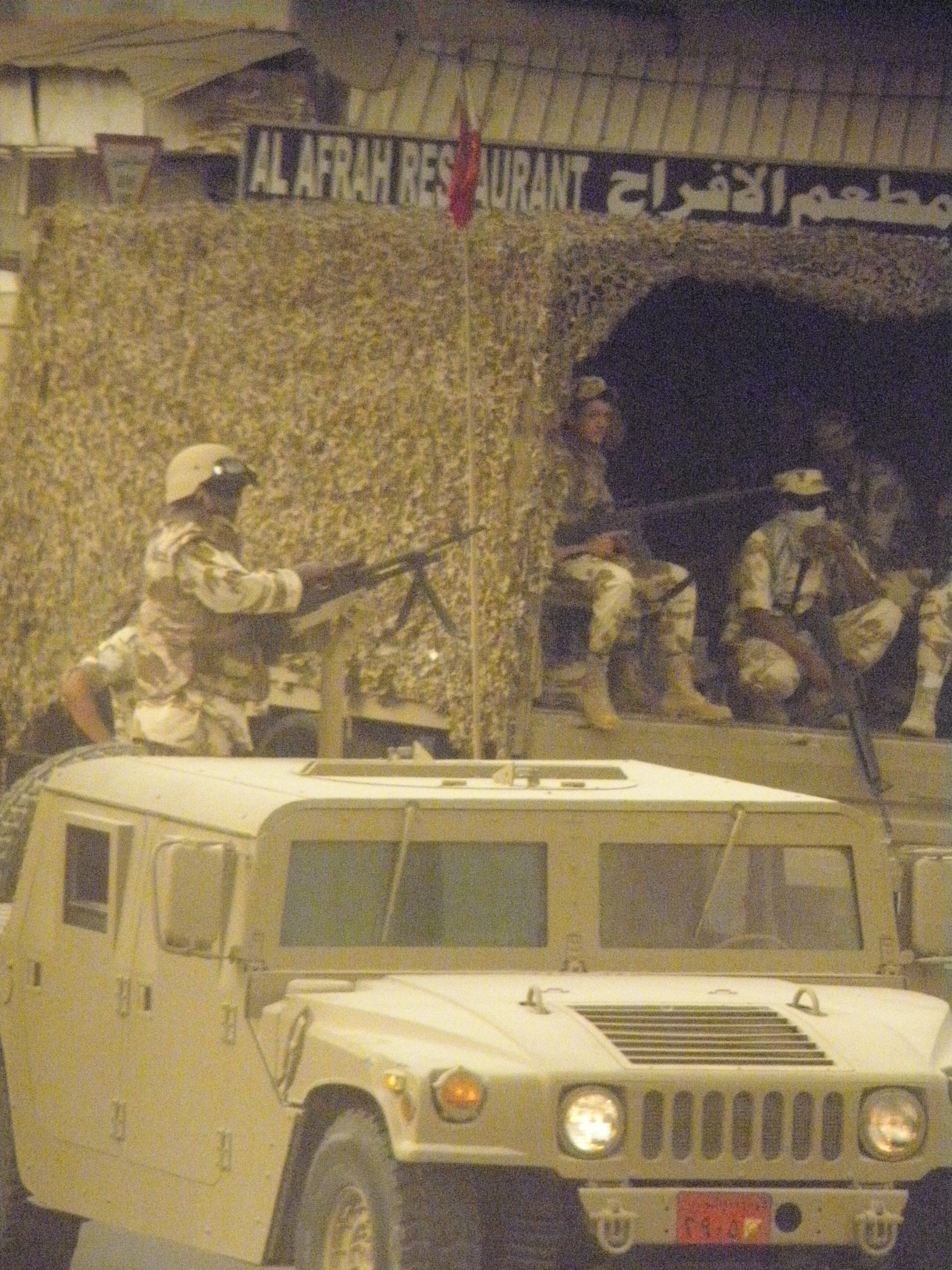
Bahrain soldiers at a village entrance on 29 March

A "day of rage" was planned across Bahrain on 25 March in order to move daily village protests into main streets, but was quickly squelched by government troops, while thousands were allowed to take part in funeral of a man killed by police birdshot where they chanted anti-government slogans. During the month, hundreds had been chanting Allahu Akbar from their rooftops in the afternoon and night. Pakistani workers, some of them working in security forces said they were living in fear as they were attacked by mobs who injured many and killed two of them earlier in the month. On 28 March, the government of Bahrain shunned a Kuwaiti mediation offer that was accepted by Al Wefaq and briefly arrested leading blogger Mahmood Al-Yousif, driving others to hide. The BBC reported that the police's brutal handling of the protests had turned Bahrain into 'island of fear'. By the end of the month, another four had died bringing the number of deaths in the month to nineteen.

Bahrain TV ran a campaign to name, punish and shame those who took part in the protest movement. Athletes were its first targets; the Hubail brothers, A'ala and Mohamed were suspended and arrested along with 200 other sportsmen after being shamed on TV. Other middle-class sectors were also targeted, including academics, businessmen, doctors, engineers, journalists and teachers. The witch-hunt expanded to the social media where Bahrainis were called to identify faces for arrests. Those arrested were checked off, among them was Ayat Al-Qurmezi who had read a poem criticizing the king and prime minister at the Pearl Roundabout. She was subsequently released following international pressure.

== Aftermath ==
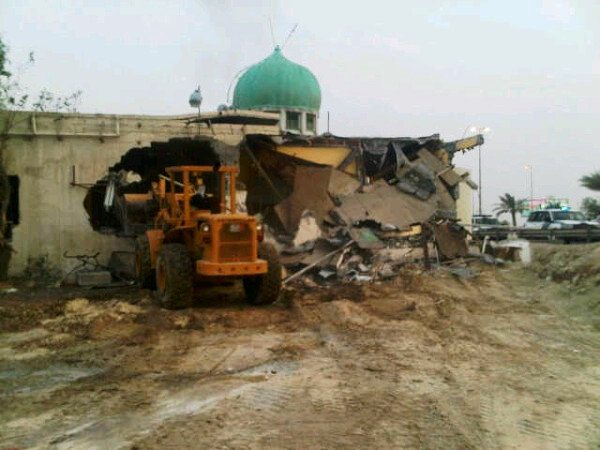
A loader destroying the 400-year-old Amir Mohammed Braighi mosque in A'ali

In April, as a part of the crackdown campaign, the government moved to destroy Shia places of worship, demolishing thirty five mosques. Although many had been standing for decades, the government said they were illegally built, and justified destroying some of them at night as to avoid hurting people's psychology. Among the destroyed was the Amir Mohammed Braighi mosque in A'ali which was built more than 400 years ago. On 2 April, following an episode on Bahrain TV alleging it had published false and fabricated news, Al-Wasat, a local newspaper was banned briefly and its editor Mansoor Al-Jamri replaced. The next day over 2,000 participated in a funeral procession in Sitra and chanted anti-government slogans, and in Manama opposition legislators staged a protest in front of United Nations building.

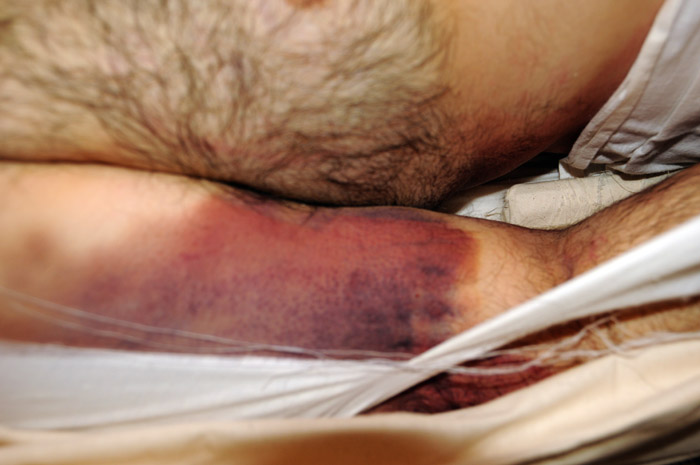
Torture marks on the body of Karim Fakhrawi before his burial on 12 April

On 9 April, human rights activist Abdulhadi al-Khawaja and his two sons-in-law were arrested. His daughter Zainab who subsequently underwent a hunger strike to protest the arrests, said al-Khawaja was bleeding after getting beaten unconscious during the arrest. That month alone, four protesters had died due to torture in government custody including journalists Karim Fakhrawi and Zakariya Rashid Hassan al-Ashiri. The government initially denied such reports and accused human rights activist Nabeel Rajab of fabricating photos, however a HRW researcher and a BBC reporter who had seen one body prior to burial stated they were accurate. Five prison guards were subsequently charged with a protesters death.

On 14 April, the Ministry of Justice moved to ban opposition groups Al Wefaq and Islamic Action Society on charges of violating laws and damaging "social peace and national unity", however following US criticism, the government of Bahrain retracted their decision saying they would wait for investigation results. On 16 April, human rights lawyer Mohammed al-Tajer, who represented leading opposition figures, was himself arrested during a night raid. On 28 April, a special military court known as the National Safety Court sentenced four protesters to death and three others to life prison over charges of premeditated murder of two policemen on 16 March. The sentences were upheld by a military court of appeal the following month.

Starting from March and throughout May, hundreds of workers including labour union leaders were fired from their jobs after the government had encouraged companies such as Gulf Air to do so. The main reasons for dismissals were absence during the one-week general strike, taking part in protests and public display of anti-government opinion. Although the government and several companies said the strike was illegal, the Bahrain Independent Commission of Inquiry stated it was "within... the law". Some workers who underwent investigations said they were shown images associating them with protests. Head of the Civil Service Bureau initially denied those reports, but few months later acknowledged that several hundred have been dismissed. In total 2,464 private sector and 2,075 public sector employees were fired for a total of 4539.

On 2 May, authorities arrested two of Al Wefaq's resigned MPs, Matar Matar and Jawad Ferooz. Later in the month, the king of Bahrain announced that the state of emergency would be lifted on 1 June, half a month before the scheduled date. Tanks, armoured vehicles and manned military checkpoints were still prevalent in Manama and a number of villages. Small protests and clashes with security forces dispersing them quickly continued in the villages and residents reported living under siege. Hate speech similar to that preceding the Rwandan genocide was reported in a pro-government newspaper which "compared Shiites to 'termites' that should be exterminated".

The first hearing for 13 opposition leaders was held on 8 May before the special military Court of National Safety marking the first time they saw their families after weeks of solitary confinement and alleged torture. On 17 May, two local journalists working for Deutsche Presse-Agentur and France 24 were briefly arrested and interrogated, and one of them reported getting mistreated. The following day, nine policemen were injured in Nuwaidrat. The Gulf Daily News reported that police were run over after they had injured and captured a "rioter", while Al Akhbar reported that police had fired on each other after a dispute, adding that this incident exposed the presence of Jordanian officers within Bahrain security forces.

On 31 May, the king of Bahrain called for a national dialogue to begin in July in order to resolve ongoing tensions. However, the seriousness and effectiveness of the dialogue has been disputed by the opposition, who referred to it disparagingly as a "chitchat room". Human Rights Watch said opposition parties were marginalized in the dialogue as they were only given 15 seats out of 297 despite winning 55% of votes in 2010 election.

On 1 June, protests erupted across Shia-dominated areas of Bahrain to demand the end of martial law as the state of emergency was officially lifted. Protests continued through early June, with demonstrators marching around the destroyed Pearl Roundabout, but security forces battled back and regularly dispersed demonstrators. The 2011 edition of the Bahrain Grand Prix, a major Formula One racing event, was officially cancelled as the uprising wore on. On 11 June, protest was announced in advance but did not receive government permission, opposition supporters said. It was held in the Shi'ite district of Saar, west of the capital. Police did not stop up to 10,000 people who came to the rally, many in cars, said a Reuters witness. Helicopters buzzed overhead.

On 13 June, Bahrain's rulers commenced the trials of 48 medical professionals, including some of the country's top surgeons, a move seen as the hounding of those who treated injured protesters during the popular uprising which was crushed by the military intervention of Saudi Arabia. On 18 June, The Bahraini government decided to lift a ban on the largest opposition party. On 22 June, the Bahraini government sent 21 opposition figures to be tried by a special security court which sentenced 8 pro-democracy activists to life in prison for their role in the uprising. Other defendants were sentenced to between two and fifteen years in jail.

On 9 August, the Bahrain Independent Commission of Inquiry announced that 137 detainees had been released, including Matar Matar and Jawad Fayrouz, Shia MPs from the Al-Wefaq opposition party.

=== 2012 ===
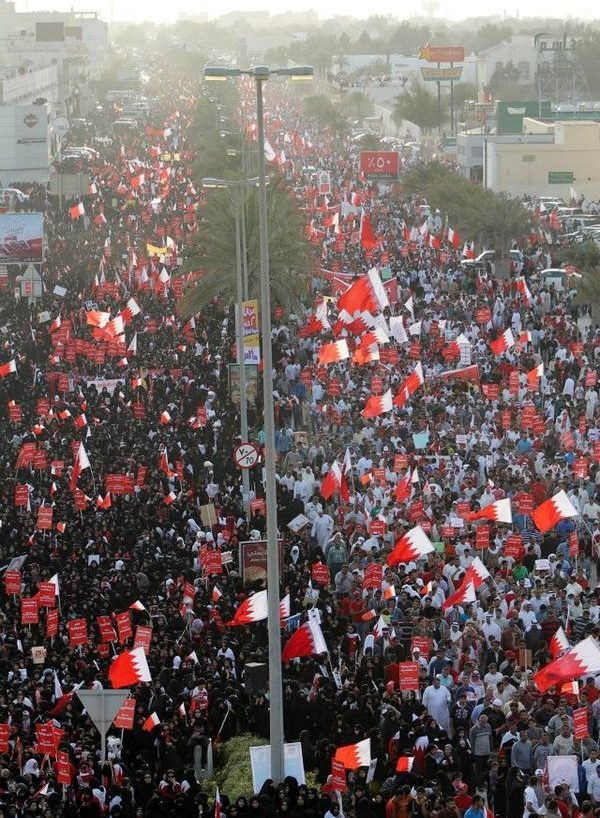
At least 100,000 people participated in one of the largest anti-government protests along Budaiya highway on 9 March

According to the Gulf Daily News on 1 February 2012, King Hamad's media affairs adviser Nabeel Al Hamer revealed plans for new talks between the opposition and the government on his Twitter account. He said that talks with political societies "had already begun to pave the way clear for a dialogue that would lead to a united Bahrain". The move was supported by Al Wefaq National Islamic Society former MP Abduljalil Khalil, who said that the society was "ready for serious dialogue and this time had no preconditions". He reiterated that "People want serious reforms that reflect their will and what they really want for their future." However the National Unity Assembly board member Khalid Al Qoud said that his society would not participate in talks "until those behind the acts of violence were arrested". The call for dialogue was echoed by Crown Prince Salman bin Hamad bin Isa Al Khalifa, who backed the initiative.

The Bahrain Debate is an initiative organised "by the youth for the youth" that brings together young people from across the spectrum of Bahraini society to debate the political and social problems confronting the country, and their solutions. The debate is not funded or organised by any political group. "In light of what has happened in Bahrain, people need to express themselves in a constructive way and listen to others' views," said Ehsan Al Kooheji, one of the organisers. "The youth are the country's future because they have the power to change things. They are extremely dynamic and energetic but have felt that they don't have a platform to express their opinions."

Bahraini independents worried that the island will slide into sectarian violence also began an effort to break the political stalemate between pro-government and opposition forces. Dr. Ali Fakhro, a former minister and ambassador "respected across the political spectrum", told Reuters that he hoped to get moderates from both sides together at a time when extremists are making themselves felt throughout the Gulf Arab state. Fakhro said the initiative, launched at a meeting on 28 January 2012, involved persuading opposition parties and pro-government groups meeting outside a government forum and agreeing on a list of basic demands for democratic reform. He launched the plan at a meeting of prominent Bahrainis with no official political affiliations or memberships, called the National Bahraini Meeting. A basic framework for discussion is the seven points for democratic reform announced by Crown Prince Salman in March 2011.

Bahraini newspaper Al Ayam reported on 7 March 2012 that the government and the opposition political societies were approaching an agreement to start a dialogue towards reconciliation and reunifying the country.

On 9 March 2012, hundreds of thousands protested in one of the biggest anti-government rallies to date. According to CNN, the march "filled a four-lane highway between Diraz and Muksha". A Reuters photographer estimated the number to be over 100,000 while opposition activists estimated the number to be between 100,000 and 250,000. Nabeel Rajab, president of the Bahrain Centre for Human Rights called the march "the biggest in our history".

The march was called for by Sheikh Isa Qassim, Bahrain's top Shia cleric. Protesters called for the downfall of the King and the release of imprisoned political leaders. The protest ended peacefully, however hundreds of youths tried to march back to the site of the now demolished symbolic Pearl roundabout, and were dispersed by security forces with tear gas.

On 10 April, seven policemen were injured when a homemade bomb exploded in Eker, the Ministry of the Interior said. The ministry blamed protesters for the attack. This was followed on 19 October by the siege of Eker.

On 18 April, in the run-up to the scheduled 2012 Bahrain Grand Prix, a car used by Force India mechanics had been involved in a petrol bombing, though there were no injuries or damage. The team members had been travelling in an unmarked car and were held up by an impromptu roadblock which they were unable to clear before a petrol bomb exploded nearby. Protests and protesters sharply increased in the spotlight of international press for the Grand Prix, and to condemn the implicit endorsement of the government by Formula One.

=== 2013 ===
Inspired by the Egyptian Tamarod Movement that played a role in the removal of President Mohamed Morsi, Bahraini opposition activists called for mass protests starting on 14 August, the forty second anniversary of Bahrain Independence Day under the banner Bahrain Tamarod. The day also marked the two and half anniversary of the Bahraini uprising. In response, the Ministry of Interior (MoI) warned against joining what it called "illegal demonstrations and activities that endanger security" and stepped up security measures.

=== 2014 ===
On 3 March, a bomb blast by Shia protesters in the village of Al Daih killed 3 police officers. One of the police officers killed was an Emirati policeman from the Peninsula Shield Force. The two other officers killed were Bahraini policemen. 25 suspects were arrested in connection to the bombing. In response to the violence, the Cabinet of Bahrain designated various protest groups as terrorist organizations.

Rajab was released from Jaw Prison in May 2014 after serving a two-year sentence on charges of “illegal gathering”, “disturbing public order” and “calling for and taking part in demonstrations” in Manama “without prior notification”.

In November, the first parliamentary elections were held in Bahrain since the beginning of the protests despite boycotts held by the Shia-majority opposition.

Protests has been met with tear gas and protests re-erupted in October 2014, as a new wave of demonstrations, and continued daily for years. Daily protests were held every day for 3 years, from 2011 to 2014.

Sheikh Ali Salman, the Secretary-General of Al-Wefaq National Islamic Society was arrested on December 28, 2014, The case against Sheikh Ali Salman is based on recorded telephone conversations he had with the-then Prime Minister and Minister of Foreign Affairs of Qatar, Sheikh Hamad Bin Jassim Bin Jabr Al Thani, in 2011. On 4 November 2018, he was sentenced to life imprisonment after being convicted of trumped-up spying charges. Two other al-Wefaq members, Ali al-Aswad and Sheikh Hassan Sultan, were convicted in their absence during the same trial.

=== 2015 ===
At the beginning of the year, thousands of demonstrators gathered after the arrest of the largest representative of the Bahraini opposition, Ali Salman, and demanded his release, but the police responded to the demonstrators by dispersing them with tear gas and rubber bombs.

The Bahraini Minister of Interior stated that "Bahrain is facing a new stage, and that the end of 2014 is considered an important and special security location in terms of the nature and diversity of events and how they affect the security situation."

This was followed by the ruling on the head of the Shura Council of Al-Wefaq Society, Jamil Kazem, for a period of six months

A six-month prison sentence was also issued against the president of the Bahrain Center for Human Rights, Nabeel Rajab, with a fine of 200 Bahraini dinars in exchange for a stay of execution pending the appeal of the verdict.

Before the end of January, the authorities issued a decree revoking the citizenship of 72 Bahraini citizens, including activists, media professionals and writers living abroad.

The authority changed the location of two mosques for Shiite Muslims and moved them to tens of meters, which angered the Shiites, who represent the majority of the population.

On the fourth anniversary of the Bahrain uprising, demonstrators came out in Shiite villages and raised pictures of Ali Salman and demanded his release. The authorities launched a campaign of arrests in response.

=== 2016 ===
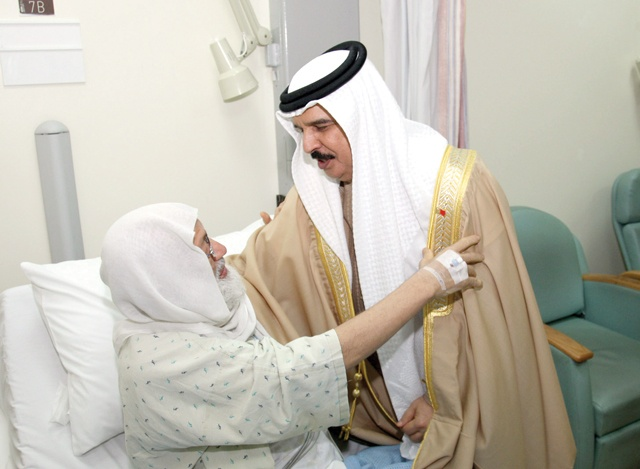
King visit to Sheikh Isa Qassim in 2009

The death sentence issued against Nimr Al-Nimr was carried out on the morning of 2 January 2016, and his execution coincided with the execution of 46 others in terrorism-related cases. The executions were carried out in 12 regions of the Kingdom of Saudi Arabia. Al-Nimr was accused of "aiding terrorists" that led to protests in Qatif. Demonstrations erupted in villages after the execution of Nimr al-Nimr.

On 20 June 2016, a week after the government of Bahrain suspended the main Shia opposition party al-Wefaq, Isa Qassim was stripped of his Bahraini citizenship. An interior ministry statement accused Sheikh Isa Qassim of “using his position to serve foreign interests" and “promote sectarianism and violence". Announcing the move to strip him of his Bahraini citizenship, the interior ministry said the cleric had "adopted theocracy and stressed the absolute allegiance to the clergy". It added that he had been in continuous contact with "organisations and parties that are enemies of the kingdom". Bahrain's citizenship law allows for the cabinet to revoke the citizenship of anyone who "causes harm to the interests of the kingdom or behaves in a way inimical with the duty of loyalty to it". Due to persecution at the hands of the Sunni regime, in December 2018 he relocated to Iraq.

After the revocation of Isa Qassim's citizenship, many people became angry. Protestors gathered at the house of Isa Qassim in Diraz. They chanted slogans, "Down down Hamad," "With our souls and blood, we will redeem you, Faqih." It was the second site where demonstrators gather after the Pearl Roundabout, which was destroyed in February 2011. The protests continued for 337 days.

On 17 July, Al Wefaq Association was permanently dissolved.

=== 2017 ===
At the beginning of the year on Sunday, the Bahraini Ministry of Interior announced that gunmen had launched an attack on Juw prison in Bahrain, which resulted in "the escape of a number of convicts in terrorist cases" and the killing of a policeman. On January 9, the ministry said that it had thwarted an escape operation by terrorist elements who tried to escape to Iran, and the operation led to the killing of three of the fugitives and the arrest of others.

On 15 January 2017, the Cabinet of Bahrain passed a capital punishment sentence of execution by firing squad on three men found guilty for the bomb attack in 2014 that killed three security forces.

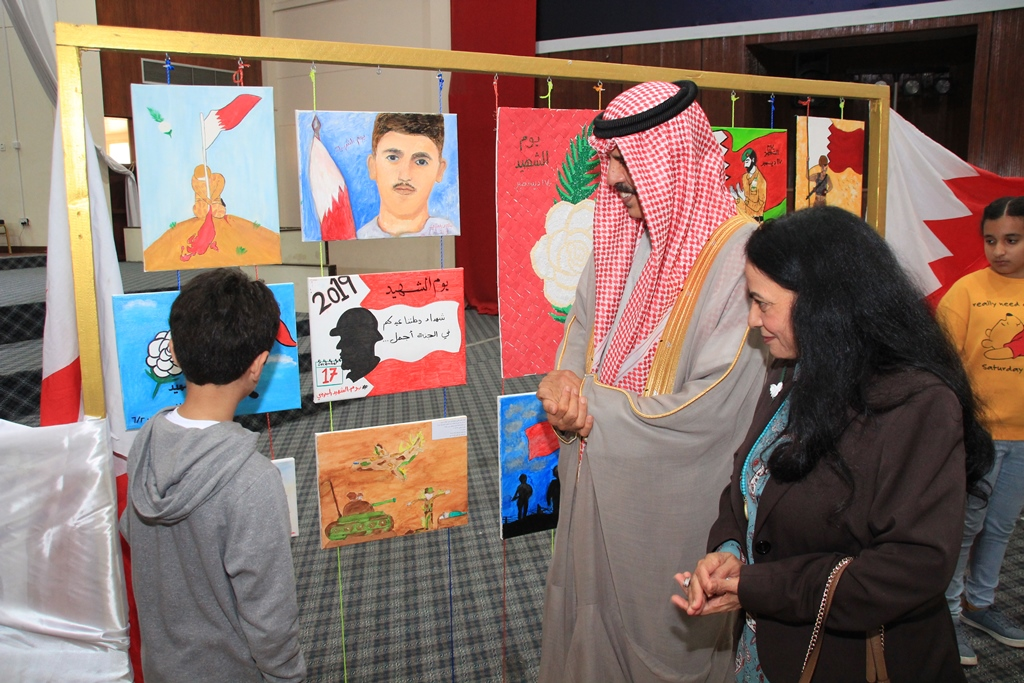
A drawing of the martyr Mustafa Hamdan in an exhibition held by the Ministry of Education in the Ministry's hall on the occasion of the official Martyr's Day.

In the early morning of Thursday, January 26, 2017, the militias of the so-called National Security Apparatus launched an attack on the protesters in front of the house of Ayatollah Sheikh Isa Ahmed Qassim in the Diraz area, which led to the injury of one person with a serious head injury, and he died on Friday, March 24.

On May 23, the mercenary forces of the regime attacked again the demonstrators in front of the house of Isa Qassim, with a violent campaign that dispersed all the demonstrators, injuring dozens and killing 5 people. And the Ministry of Interior issued a statement saying that the forces arrested 286 people, saying that they were violators, and many of them are wanted and dangerous, and convicted of terrorist cases.

The government of Bahrain forcibly closed Al-Wasat newspaper on 4 June 2017, in a move which Amnesty International termed an "all-out campaign to end independent reporting".

=== 2018 ===
On the morning of Wednesday, February 7, 2018, four young men drowned in the territorial waters between Bahrain and the Islamic Republic of Iran in mysterious circumstances while trying to flee to the Islamic Republic. The bodies of three of them were found on February 15 and the other on March 5, and they were buried in Qom.

Bahrain government revoked the citizenship of 115 people and handed 53 of them life sentences on terrorism-related charges. Since 2012, a total of 718 individuals have been stripped of their Bahraini nationality, including 231 since the beginning of 2018. In most cases these individuals were rendered stateless. Some have subsequently been forcibly expelled from Bahrain.

Hakeem al-Araibi was arrested on arrival in Thailand from Australia for a vacation in November 2018 on the basis of an Interpol "red notice" issued by Bahrain, and was held there pending deportation to Bahrain, which he opposed. There was a campaign urging Thailand not to extradite him until 11 February 2019, when the Thai Office of the Attorney-General dropped the extradition case against him at Bahrain's request. He was returned to Australia the next day and became an Australian citizen in the weeks thereafter. His case was widely reported on major news outlets throughout the world.

=== 2019 ===
On April 16, A Bahraini court today convicted 139 people on terrorism charges in a mass trial involving a total of 169 defendants, sentencing them to prison terms of between three years and life in prison. In total, 138 of those convicted were arbitrarily stripped of their citizenship, and a further 30 were acquitted. “This trial also demonstrates how Bahrain’s authorities are increasingly relying on revocation of nationality as a tool for repression – around 900 people have now been stripped of their citizenship since 2012.

The authorities executed two Bahrainis convicted of "terrorism" by firing squad at dawn on Saturday, July 27, as announced by the Kingdom's Public Prosecutor in a statement, while a third convict was executed in a separate murder case. The Public Prosecutor did not mention the names of the two Bahrainis, while human rights organizations had said that they were Ali Al-Arab (25 years) and Ahmed Al-Malali (24 years), calling for a suspension of the execution of the sentence against them. Judicial sources stated that they are from the Shiite sect. The attorney general's statement stated that the subject of the first case was "focused on joining a terrorist group, committing murder and possessing explosives and firearms in fulfillment of a terrorist purpose." The persons concerned were arrested in February 2017, and sentences were issued against them on January 31, 2018, and since then they have exhausted all appeals.

=== 2020 ===
In June, Nabeel Rajab, head of the outlawed Bahrain Centre for Human Rights, was released from prison on probation, after serving four years for posting on Twitter criticizing the government’s human rights record.

A Bahraini woman, Najah Yousef, told BBC Arabic that she had been tortured and raped in a security compound after protesting against the Formula 1 car race in 2017, and Ebtisam Al-Saegh confirmed that she had been subjected to similar violations in the same compound a few weeks later.

=== 2021 ===
Three detainees died in Bahraini prisons in 2021 amid allegations of medical negligence. Health and hygiene conditions in Bahrain’s overcrowded prisons remain serious, leading to two major COVID-19 outbreaks. Prison authorities violently suppressed a peaceful sit-in at the Jau Prison, and security forces summoned for interrogation and arrested individuals who participated in protests calling for the release of their family members from detention.

Twelve of the country’s most prominent Shi’a civic, religious and political leaders remained in prison. Eleven had been in prison since 2011 for their participation in mass opposition demonstrations that year. Sheikh Ali Salman, leader of the largest legal political bloc in Bahrain between 2006 and 2011, continued serving a life sentence imposed in 2018 based on falsified charges of “spying” for Qatar.

=== 2022 ===
Serbia extradited a Bahraini political dissident to Bahrain in the early hours of January 24, 2022, despite an order by the European Court of Human Rights that specifically prohibited his extradition pending more information, Human Rights Watch said today. Bahraini authorities had previously subjected the dissident, Ahmed Jaffer Muhammad, 48, to torture and ill-treatment.

=== 2023 ===
On May 30, the Saudi authorities executed two Bahrainis, Sadiq Thamer and Jaafar Sultan, for allegedly "joining a terrorist cell." Hundreds of Bahrainis took to the streets in several Bahraini regions to protest against the execution of the two young men by the Saudi authorities The two young men, Jaafar Sultan and Sadiq Thamer, were arrested on May 8, 2015 on the King Fahd Causeway, which connects Saudi Arabia and Bahrain. The Saudi authorities later charged them with preparing to blow up the bridge. Both Sultan and Thamer denied the charges against them, considering them to be politically motivated. Human rights organizations have documented their torture by Saudi security forces to extract confessions during detention.

== Censorship and repression ==
The Bahrain Centre for Human Rights said that Bahraini authorities were blocking a Facebook group being used for planned protests on 14 February, and that its own website had been blocked for many years. Nabeel Rajab, head of the centre, said that the group was "only asking for political reforms, right of political participation, respect for human rights, stopping of systematic discrimination against Shias". Several bloggers were arrested prior to 6 February.

Following the deployment of Gulf Cooperation Council forces, the government stepped up the arrests of Shia Muslims, including many cyber activists, with more than 300 detained and dozens missing, the opposition stated on 31 March. Rajab said that a growing number of reform campaigners were going into hiding, after the country's most-prominent blogger, Mahmood al-Yousif, was arrested a day earlier, on 30 March. Although al-Yousif was released on 1 April, several other people, including Abdul Khaleq al-Oraibi, a pro-opposition doctor working at Salmaniya Hospital, were detained.

Google Earth had previously been blocked after it showed the locations of the ruling family's estates which was reported to have stirred up discontent.

On 3 April, Bahraini authorities prevented the publishing of Al-Wasat, the country's main opposition newspaper, and blocked its website. The Information Affairs Authority was said to be investigating allegations that editors intentionally published misleading information. However, on 4 April, the newspaper resumed printing, although a government spokesperson said the newspaper had broken press laws.

On 14 April, the Justice Ministry stated it was seeking to ban the Wefaq party, as well as the Islamic Action Party, a Wefaq ally, for "undertaking activities that harmed social peace, national unity, and inciting disrespect for constitutional institutions." The US State Department quickly raised concerns about these plans, prompting the Bahraini authorities to state, a day later, that they were holding off on any action until investigations into the Wefaq party were finalized.

In early May, Al Wefaq claimed that in response to the protests, Bahraini police had "raided up to 15 mainly girls schools, detaining, beating and threatening to rape girls as young as 12." Based on its own investigation, Al Jazeera English described the police actions as "periodic raids on girls' schools" and interviewed a 16-year-old girl, "Heba", who had been taken from her school together with three other pupils and beaten severely during three days of police detention.

By mid-May, 28 mosques and Shia religious buildings had been destroyed by the Bahraini authorities in response to the anti-government protests, according to Al Jazeera English and journalist Robert Fisk. The Justice Ministry stated that the mosques were destroyed because they were unlicensed. Adel Mouwda, first deputy speaker of the Council of Representatives of Bahrain, stated that the buildings destroyed were mostly "not mosques" since they were "expansions of mosques in some private territories", and that some of the mosques destroyed were Sunni mosques.

In September, twenty Bahraini medical professionals who had been arrested for treating protesters at the Salmaniya Medical Complex were handed jail terms of up to twenty years on charges of anti-government activity. The international community immediately denounced the sentences, saying that they demonstrated a disregard for human rights and violated the principle of medical neutrality.

In October, the Bahraini government nullified the convictions and scheduled retrials in civilian courts, which are ongoing. Despite promises of greater transparency, the Bahraini government has denied several human rights activists access to the trial, including Rick Sollom, Deputy Director of Physicians for Human Rights.

=== Controversies ===
==== Mohamed Ramadan ====
Al Khalifa regime in Bahrain, knowingly refused for more than two years to investigate complaints regarding the torture of Mohamed Ramadan—a father-of-three on death row who was tortured into making a false confession.

In February 2014, Mohammed was arrested at Bahrain International Airport, where he worked as a police officer. He was accused of involvement in an attack on other police officers, despite a total lack of evidence tying him to the crime. In reality, Mohammed is an innocent man who was arrested in retaliation for his attendance at peaceful pro-democracy demonstrations.

Following his arrest, Mohammed was brutally tortured by police into signing a false confession, despite his innocence. During his initial detention, police officers told Mohammed outright that they knew he was innocent, but were punishing him as a traitor for attending pro-democracy demonstrations.

During his entire detention, Mohammed has never been allowed to meet with his lawyer. The day Mohammed's trial began was the first time he ever saw his lawyer's face. In that trial, he was convicted and sentenced to death almost solely on the basis of confessions extracted through prolonged torture.

The detention of Mohammad along with another activist, Husain Moosa, was contested by the U.N. Working Group on Arbitrary Detention. The UN watchdog claims that Mohammad is being detained on a discriminatory basis following his critical political opinion against the Bahraini regime and participation in pro-democracy protests. A government spokesperson called the report by the UN watchdog “one-sided and misinformed” claiming that the physical and psychological well-being of Mr. Ramadan was at risk.

==== Seven men under capital punishment (2016) ====
Reprieve a human rights defender organisation published an investigative report about British involvement in the Bahrain regime's atrocities in 2016. The report says that seven innocent men are facing the death penalty in Bahrain after being tortured into the false confessions of crimes.

==== Execution of Sami Mushaima, Ali Al-Singace, andAbbas Al-Samea (2017) ====
External videos
- Abbas Al-Samea is talking about his innocence1 on YouTube
- Abbas Al-Samea is talking about his innocence2 on YouTube

On 15 January 2017, Cabinet of Bahrain passed a capital punishment sentence of three Shia protesters convicted of orchestrating a bomb attack which killed an Emirati policeman from the Peninsula Shield Force and two Bahraini policemen on 3 March 2014. 42-year-old Sami Mushaima, 21-year-old Ali Al-Singace, and 27-year-old Abbas Al-Samea confessed to orchestrating the bomb attack and were executed by firing squad.

According to Americans for Democracy & Human Rights in Bahrain, Bahrain security forces arrested Sami Mushaima in March 2014 and held him incommunicado for at least eleven days. Security officials subjected Mushaima to beatings, electrocution, sexual assault, and severely damaged his front teeth. Mushaima's family believes he was coerced into falsely confessing through the use of torture. The executions ofSami Mushaima, Ali Al-Singace and Abbas Al-Samea have sparked protests from members of the opposition in Bahrain.

==== Execution of Ali Al-Arab and Ahmed Al-Malali (2019) ====
On 27 July 2019, the authorities executed two people, Ali Al-Arab (25 years) and Ahmed Al-Malali (24 years). The Public Prosecutor's statement stated that the subject of the case "revolved around joining a terrorist group, committing murder, and possessing explosives and firearms for a terrorist purpose." The persons concerned were arrested in February 2017 and sentenced on January 31, 2018, and since then they have exhausted all appeals.

=== Expulsions ===
Al-wasat reported on 12 April, Issue no. 3139, that sixteen Lebanese nationals were requested by the Bahraini security services to leave the country. No details or reasons for the request were given.

However, the Bahraini government claimed in a confidential report to the UN in April 2011 that Lebanese political organisation Hezbollah, considered a terrorist group by the US, is present in Bahrain and is actively involved in the organisation of the unrest.

In July 2014 Bahrain expelled the United States Assistant Secretary of State for Democracy, Human Rights and Labor, Tom Malinowski, after he had met members of the leading Shia opposition group, Al-Wefaq, a move that the Foreign ministry of Bahrain said 'intervened in the country's domestic affairs'. Previously, in May 2011, pro government websites and newspapers targeted US embassy's human rights officer, Ludovic Hood, and published information on where he and his family lived after accusing him of training and provoking demonstrations, being a Zionist and working in cooperation with Hezbollah. Hood had been photographed handing out donuts to demonstrators outside the US embassy in Bahrain. The US government subsequently withdrew Hood from Bahrain.

=== Incarcerations ===
Amongst the more prominent opposition figures, the Al-Khawaja family has been intermittently in and out of prison, even before the uprising began. Since the start of the uprising, Abdulhadi al-Khawaja, the former president of the Bahrain Centre for Human Rights, was placed on trial for his part in the uprising. On 22 June, he was sentenced to life in prison. His daughters and sons-in-law have also been intermittently in and out of prison since the counter-revolutionary crackdown by the government.

Ayat Al-Qurmezi was also found guilty of organising protests and assembling at the Pearl Roundabout and reading a poem critical of government policy. Sheikh Abdul-Aziz bin Mubarak, her spokesman, said that the poem "caused incitement and hatred to his majesty the king and to the prime minister" with lines such as "we are people who kill humiliation" and "assassinate misery."

Human rights lawyer Mohammed al-Tajer was detained on 16 April 2011, apparently for providing legal support to other arrested activists. He was held incommunicado for two months before being charged with inciting hatred for the regime, engaging in illegal protests, and inciting people to harm police. He was released on 7 August, though the charges against him were not dropped.

As of 22 May 515 detainees had been released and more than 140 were released on 9 August.

Rights defender Al-Khawaja who turned 60 years old on April 5, 2021, also completed 10 years in the same month since his arrest on 9 April 2011 following a call for a political uprising in the Arab Spring protest. During his imprisonment, Al-Khawaja was physically and sexually abused and subjected to systematic torture followed by solitary confinement. Marking his 60th birthday, 10 international human rights organizations called for his unconditional and instant release from prison. According to a combined report by the Bahrain Center for Human Rights (BCHR) and the Gulf Centre for Human Rights (GCHR) that the perpetrators behind the psychological and physical abuse of Al-Khawaja have never been held responsible.

=== Torture ===
Torture during the uprising has been described in many human rights reports as being widespread and systematic. 64% of detainees (1,866 individuals) reported being tortured. At least five individuals died as a result. During the uprising detainees were interrogated by three government agencies, the Ministry of Interior (MoI), the National Security Agency (NSA) and the Bahrain Defence Force. According to the Bahrain Independent Commission of Inquiry (BICI) report, physical and psychological abuse was inflicted by the NSA and the MoI on a systematic basis and in many cases amounted to torture. The BICI report describes the systematic use of techniques similar to those used during the repression of the 1990s uprising as indicative of "a systemic problem, which can only be addressed on a systemic level".

=== Use of mercenaries ===
For decades, the Bahraini authorities have been recruiting Sunni foreign nationals in the security forces from different countries, including Jordan, Syria, Iraq (Ba'athists), Yemen and Pakistan (Baluch) in order to confront any popular movement that usually comes from the Shia majority. In 2009, Bahrain Centre for Human Rights claimed that 64 percent of National Security Agency employees were foreigners and that only 4 percent were Shia. Pakistanis mainly from Balochistan make up 30 percent of Bahrain security forces and are usually recruited via the Fauji Foundation. Bahrainis, Al Jazeera English, Hindustan Times, Time magazine and Bruce Riedel referred to them as mercenaries. The Bahraini government admits it recruits foreigners in security forces, although it does not describe them as mercenaries. "We have no mercenaries. We have workers who have been serving at the Ministry of Interior for many years. Some of them have been naturalized and their children are working at the ministry", said Rashid bin Abdullah Al Khalifa, the Minister of Interior.

During the uprising, the deportation of Syrians and Pakistanis serving with the security forces was one of protesters' main goals; one of their slogans was against hiring Pakistanis in the riot police department. "There is no security when the police come from Pakistan", they chanted. One month after the uprising began, the ministry of interior announced 20,000 jobs in security forces were available for Bahrainis, including protesters. The move was considered a step to satisfy protesters' demands. However, advertisements of "urgent requirement" in the National Guard, special forces and riot police were spread in Pakistani media.

The appearance of the advertisements was preceded by two "quiet trips" to Pakistan by Bandar bin Sultan, now the Director General of the Saudi Intelligence Agency. Later, the Foreign Minister of Bahrain, Khalid bin Ahmed Al Khalifa and commander of the National Guard made a similar visit. It was only then that the advertisements started appearing. The Pakistani government said they have "nothing to do" with these recruitments, because they are done via "private channels". However, the Iran News Agency reported that in August 2011, Asif Ali Zardari, the President of Pakistan has agreed to send more Pakistani troops to Bahrain during his one-day visit to the country. It was also reported by The Jakarta Post that the Bahraini government tried to hire Malaysian mercenaries.

Al Jazeera English sources estimated that the number of riot police and the National Guard has increased by as high as 50 percent after at least 2,500 Pakistanis were recruited in April and May 2011. According to Nabeel Rajab, the exact size of the increase is not known, however he said it was "much more than 1,500 or 2,000". The size of the National Guard in 2011 was estimated by the US State Department to be 1,200. After requirements its size has increased by about 100 percent.

Foreigner officers were among security forces ordered to attack protesters. The BICI report mentioned that officers of Pakistani origins were responsible for mistreatment of detainees. "He was beaten, tortured and hung. During the first three days, he was stripped of his clothes and sexually assaulted, in addition to being deprived of sleep ... He was routinely beaten and insulted by the prison guards, all of whom were of Pakistani origin", the report mentioned.

Bahraini human rights groups and opposition parties have heavily criticized recruiting mercenaries in the Bahraini security forces. Nabeel Rajab said "They're told they are going to go to a holy war in Bahrain to kill some non-Muslims or kafir [infidel] or Shias ... And those are maybe responsible for a lot of killing and a lot of systematic torture and human rights violations committed in the past months and years". Michael Stephens, of the Royal United Services Institute linked recruiting mercenaries in the Bahraini security forces to the lack of government confidence in its own citizens. "So they rely on foreign recruits to unquestioningly carry out orders of violently suppressing protests", he said. Bruce Riedel, a leading American expert on South Asia said "when the very serious demonstrations began and it looked like the regime might even be toppled at a certain point, their hiring of mercenaries went up substantially".

== Casualties ==
=== Injuries ===
The total number of injured since the start of the uprising is not known. This is due to protesters fear of being arrested while receiving treatment at hospitals for injuries sustained during the protest. As of 16 March 2011, the total number is, at least 2,708. Another 200 injuries were treated by Médecins Sans Frontières outside hospitals, for a total of 2,908. A doctor who asked to remain anonymous said he secretly treats about 50 injured protesters a week (~2,500 in a year). In addition, minister of Interior Rashid bin Abdullah Al Khalifa claimed that 395 police officers were injured, four of them allegedly "abducted and tortured".

=== Deaths ===
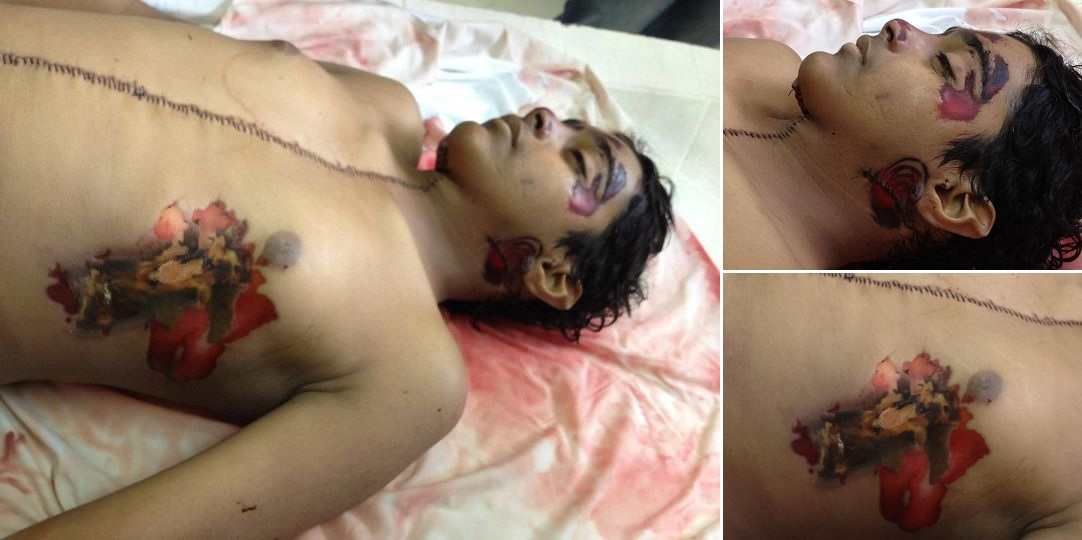
The government claims that the burns on Sayed Hashim's body were inconsistent with burns caused by a tear gas canister

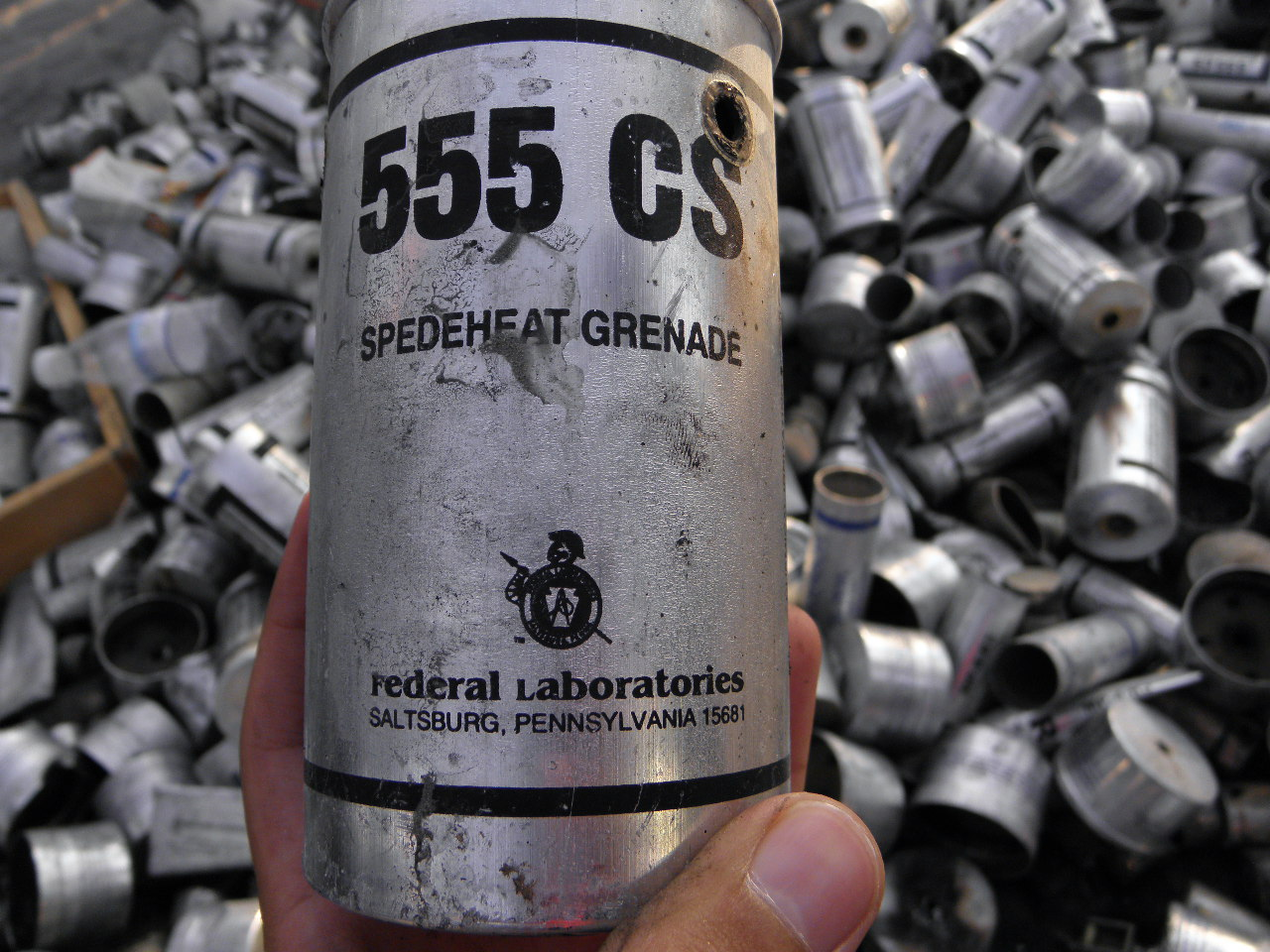
Front of an empty US-made tear gas canister

The Bahrain Independent Commission of Inquiry found that there were 35 deaths between 14 February and 15 April 2011 linked to the uprising. The Commission found the government responsible for 20 of these deaths, protesters responsible for 3, and mobs responsible for 2. The commission could not attribute the remaining 10 deaths to a perpetrator. Additionally, the Commission found that there were another 11 deaths potentially linked to the uprising between 16 April and 6 October 2011. Between 7 October 2011 and 5 April 2012, the Bahrain Centre for Human Rights (BCHR) reported 32 deaths linked to the uprising, for a total of 78 deaths. The total number, counting all related incidents, even those not mentioned in the BICI report and BCHR is 90 deaths as of 21 April 2012.

Bahrain's Gulf Daily News newspaper reported that anti-government protesters attacked and killed an elderly taxi driver on 13 March. Other local newspapers reported that he was beaten to death by "terrorists." Bahrain's independent Al-Wasat newspaper cited witnesses saying the taxi driver died in a traffic accident. The Bahrain Independent Commission of Inquiry did not report any such death connected to the unrest. Additionally, a report by the Associated Press, quoting an unnamed security official in Saudi Arabia, stated that a Saudi soldier was shot dead by protesters in Bahrain on 15 March. Bahrain state television denied this report, and the Commission did not report any such death connected to the unrest.

Deaths
Cause of death	Civilians	Expatriates	Security forces
Birdshot	14	–	–
Gunshot	5	1	1
Torture	5	–	–
Physical abuse	7	2	1
Auto-pedestrian collision	3	1	11
Tear gas (allegedly*)	41	2	–
Other	11	1	4
Disputed	4	–	–

* The government does not recognize most deaths that were attributed to the use of tear gas.

Deaths
Killed by	Civilians	Expatriates	Security forces
Security forces	23	1	1
Protesters	–	–	11
Unknown assailants	8	2	5
Disputed	16	1	–
Security forces (allegedly)	41	2	–
Not applicable	3	1	–

* A trial for 7 protesters accused of killing police is still going on.

Notable deaths

- Ali Abdulhadi Mushaima
- Fadhel Al-Matrook
- Deaths of Bloody Thursday
- Karim Fakhrawi
- Zakariya Rashid Hassan al-Ashiri
- Ali Jawad al-Sheikh
- Ahmed Jaber al-Qattan

== Media coverage of the uprising ==
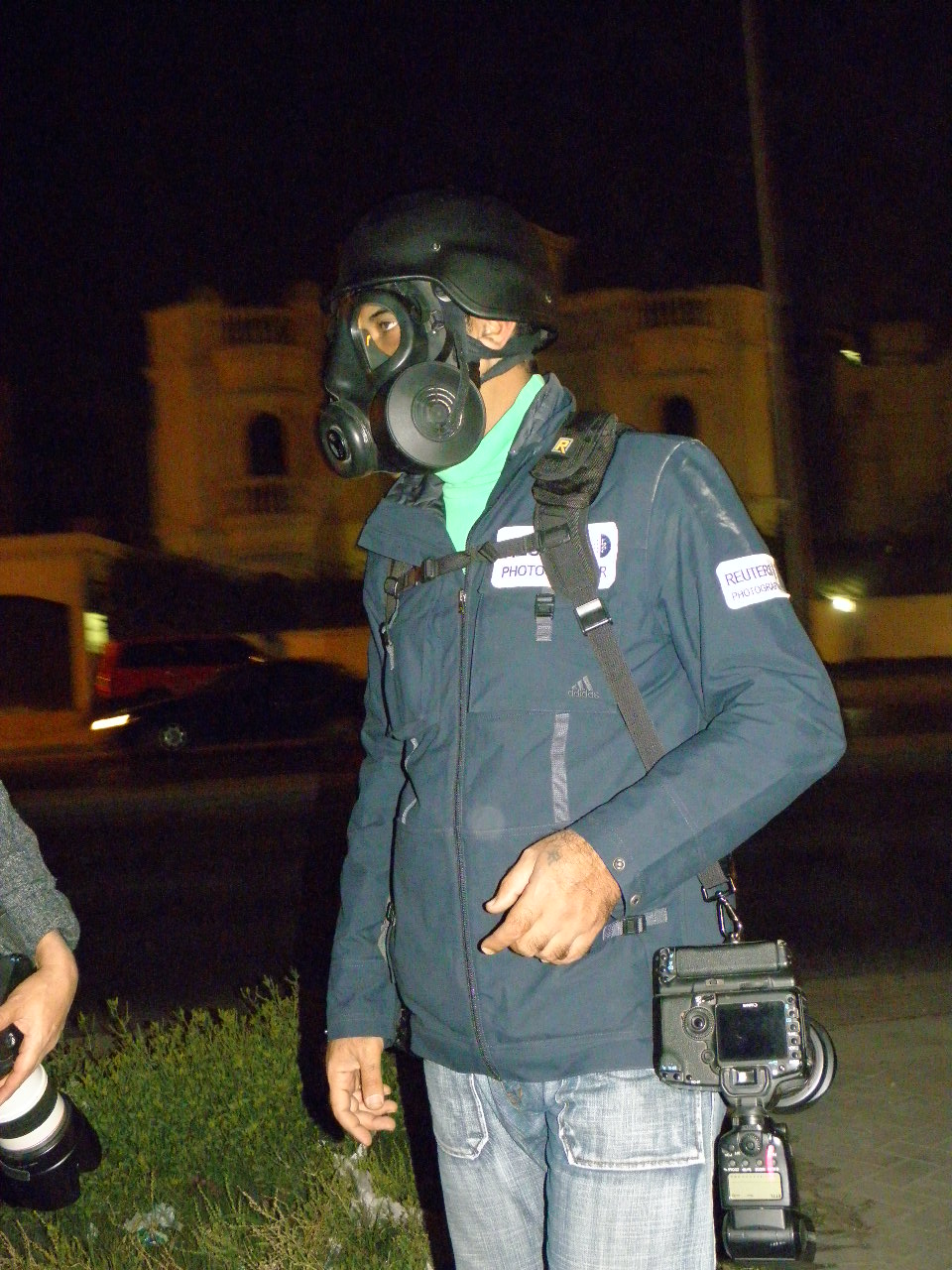
Reuters photographer Hamad I Mohamed wearing a gas mask while covering a protest

Coverage of the uprising within Bahrain has been controversial and confusing, with numerous incidents where media outlets reported conflicting reports of deaths and violence both by government forces and anti-government protesters. Both national and international journalists have had difficulty gaining access to protests and allegations of bias have caused scandals in two leading Arabic new sources, Al Jazeera and Al Arabiya.

=== International coverage ===
International correspondents from several major news outlets had difficulty gaining entry to Bahrain or, once there, having the freedom to pursue stories. The Information Affairs Authority (IAA) lists a number of media outlets that would be allowed access to Bahrain, including the BBC, Financial Times and news agencies such as Reuters and the Associated Press. However, claiming that the western media published and broadcast false and biased reports, the government of Bahrain denied visas to several international journalists. The Agence France-Presse (AFP), The New York Times, The Wall Street Journal, The Christian Science Monitor, and the UK's Channel 4 and Al Jazeera all applied for media visas but had their applications denied.

In addition to refusing to grant visas, Bahraini authorities had detained several journalists. On 31 March 2011, four CNN journalists were detained on a charge of not having proper documents. The journalists stated they did possess the correct documents, however, they were not able to conduct the interviews they had scheduled because of their source's fear of being arrested. When the same journalists attempted to interview the president of the Bahrain Centre for Human Rights, Rajab, at his home, six military vehicles arrived and 20 masked men surrounded the CNN team and Rajab and deleted all of the photos. Another CNN reporter, Mohammed Jamjoom, was expelled from Bahrain on 16 March, the same day he arrived. He said he was asked to leave without any explanation and a government official escorted him to the airport. CNN produced a documentary about the use of Internet technology and social media in the Arab Spring, including a 13-minute segment on the Bahraini uprising that reported repressive conduct by the government; CNN aired the documentary only once in the United States and not at all on CNN International.

Reuters correspondent Frederik Richter, was expelled on 10 May for what the Bahraini government said was biased reporting. On at least two occasions the Bahraini government has commenced or announced legal action against news sources or reporters for articles targeting Bahrain and the Kingdom of Saudi Arabia.

The Bahrain Freedom Movement posted on their website that, in the second week of February, many journalists were banned from entering the country to report on the deteriorating situation-especially as the regime increased its cracked down on the protesters.

In order to evaluate the situation of freedom of expression in the country, a delegation of international NGOs was supposed to make a visit from 5 to 10 May 2012. The delegation received permission from the Bahraini government on 11 April. The government, however, withdrew its permission on 30 April, claiming that new regulations had taken effect that prevented the presence of more than one international NGO in any one week. The delegation was to have consisted of representatives of NGOs including Reporters Without Borders, Freedom House, the Gulf Centre for Human Rights, Index on Censorship, PEN International and the Committee to Protect Journalists.

In June 2012, the BBC admitted making "major errors" in its coverage of the unrest. In an 89-page report, 9 pages were devoted to the BBC's coverage of Bahrain and included admissions that the BBC had "underplayed the sectarian aspect of the conflict" and "not adequately conveyed the viewpoint of supporters of the monarchy" by "[failing] to mention attempts by Crown Prince His Royal Highness Prince Salman bin Hamad Al Khalifa to establish dialogue with the opposition". The report added that "the government appears to have made a good-faith effort to de-escalate the crisis" in particular during a period when the BBC's coverage of the unrest dropped substantially and that many people had complained that their coverage was "utterly one-sided".

Media associated with the Gulf Cooperation Council, keep labeling the Shia-majority population in opposition to the ruling Sunni regime as "terrorists", "anarchists" and "trouble makers." At the same time, the Bahraini regime is presented as non-secterian, tolerant and merciful.

=== CNN controversy ===
On 29 September 2012, US journalist Amber Lyon, who was covering the uprising for CNN, described her investigation of how the US ally Bahrain was committing human rights abuses, but said that CNN and the US government pressured her to suppress the news. A documentary on which she had been working was never aired.

=== Al Jazeera controversy ===
Despite extensive, and sometimes even non-stop coverage of the revolutions in Tunisia and Egypt, Al Jazeera's coverage of Bahrain was much less comprehensive.

"Despite being banned in Egypt, Al Jazeera went to great lengths to provide non-stop live coverage of events. It did not do that in Bahrain."

— Ghanem Nuseibeh, Reuters

In February 2011, several key personnel in Al Jazeera's Beirut office resigned in protest, citing the channel's 'biased' coverage of the uprisings in Syria and Bahrain. This includes Bureau managing director Hassan Shaaban and correspondent Ali Hashem. Hashem stated that the channel refused to show photos which might favor the Syrian government's position and would not air material that showed violence in Bahrain.

Ghassan Ben Jeddo, who had been the head of the Beirut Bureau before resigning in April 2011, said that Al Jazeera was biased in covering the Arab Spring, especially in Syria and Bahrain.

California State University, Stanislaus politics professor As'ad AbuKhalil noted that Al Jazeera avoided inviting Bahraini or Omani or Saudi critics of the Bahraini regime to speak on the air, alluding to the also scant coverage of protests in Oman and Saudi Arabia.

In April 2011, David Pollack at the Washington Institute for Near East Policy, noted that, "Al jazeera Arabic did not report on the hardening of the Bahraini opposition on 8 March, when the Coalition for a Bahraini Republic called for an end to the monarchy, nor did it cover protests held there on 9, 10 March, and 13, the critical days leading to Saudi Arabia's decision to send troops into Bahrain." In one extreme example Pollack noted that at one point Al Jazeera English had a picture of Saudi troops headed across the causeway connecting Saudi Arabia and Bahrain while Al Jazeera Arabic ran a completely different headline proclaiming "Bahrain's Government Rejects Foreign Intervention" — alluding to a rejection Iranian interference.

In 2010, a WikiLeaks document mentioned Al Jazeera several times. One such document revealed that the Qatari government referred to Al Jazeera as "a bargaining tool to repair relationships with other countries, particularly those soured by Al Jazeera's broadcasts, including the United States." This was confirmed by another WikiLeaks document stating "Relations [between Qatar and Saudi Arabia] are generally improving after Qatar toned down criticism of the House of Saud on Al Jazeera." Another WikiLeaks document indicated that Al Jazeera "has proved itself a useful tool for the station's political masters.".

Al Jazeera's leadership told Reuters in mid-April 2011 that it faced a "challenging terrain" in Bahrain and that "Editorial priorities are weighed on a number of factors at any given moment.".

Journalist Don Debar, who has Al Jazeera experience, confirmed that the station has been heavily guided by the Qatari government in its policies. Stating, "The head of the bureau in Beirut quit, many other people quit because of the biased coverage and outright hand of the government in dictating editorial policy over Libya, and now Syria".

Critics did note that Al Jazeera coverage of the crisis in Bahrain did increase in May and June 2011 and conceded that the severe press restrictions in Bahrain made coverage extremely difficult.

The Qatar-based Al Jazeera has been heralded as one of the few networks who gave comprehensive and unbiased coverage of the Tunisian and Egyptian revolutions. The network is widely credited with helping protests maintain the momentum which resulted in the overthrow of the entrenched regimes of Tunisia's Zine El Abidine Ben Ali and Egypt's Hosni Mubarak. Al Jazeera was able to subvert government bans on its coverage by soliciting images from people on the ground, even providing them with a special address where they could send mobile phone images. When social unrest began in Yemen and Al Jazeera turned their focus east, Yemeni President, Ali Abdullah Saleh, accused the network of running an "operations room to burn the Arab nation." and revoked the Al Jazeera correspondents' licenses.

=== Coverage within Bahrain ===
Media coverage from within Bahrain has been problematic. Some cases produced only gone unconfirmed or contradictory reports, such as the death of an elderly taxi driver on 13 March 2011. The Gulf Daily News reported that the driver had been beaten to death by anti-government protesters. Other Bahraini media reported the driver as killed by terrorists. Independent newspaper Al-Wasat reported the cause of death as a simple traffic accident and cited witnesses. The Commission of Inquiry did not report any deaths like this connected to the uprisings.

Beginning in med-February 2011, Bahrain's main television station, BTV, launched a series of talk shows whose sole purpose appears to have been the incitement of public opinion against opposition sympathizers. Protesters were described by talk-show hosts as 'terrorists', 'foreign agents' and 'thugs'.

Another instance was the supposed death of a Saudi Arabian soldier on 15 March 2011, reported by the Associated Press. The information was said to have come from a Saudi official, but Bahrain news organizations denied the report and the Commission of Inquiry, again, found no proof of it.

Bahraini newspapers have given substantial coverage to the protests, although many of them tend to self-censor and adopt the government point of view, avoiding criticism of the king and the Royal family.

Al-Wasat, a newspaper founded by an opposition figure in 2004, was an exception to this rule and a positive influence on other newspapers according to the Committee to Protect Journalists. Despite all the censorship, the Government allowed Al-Wasat to keep operating, only suspending the newspaper for one day, on 3 April 2011. However, this permission came with heavy costs to the newspaper's editors and journalists. After the suspension on 3 April the editor-in-chief, among other editors, was forced to resign and Karim Fakhrami, one of the founders of Al-Wasat, was arrested on the same day and died in custody on 12 April. The public announcement said that his death was due to kidney failure. However, the Committee to Protect Journalists said that there were bruises on his body and the final report of the Commission of Inquiry classified Fakhrami's death as due to torture.

Recent events against Bahraini media led Reporters without Borders to issue this statement:

The Kingdom of Bahrain (173rd) plunged 29 places to become one of the world's 10 most repressive countries. Bahraini and foreign journalists were systematically hounded from February onwards. An entire arsenal of measures were taken to prevent information circulating about the evolving situation in the country. At the same time, the authorities made extensive use of the media to put out pro-government propaganda. The creation of an independent commission of enquiry did not end the abuses against journalists. It just helped to ensure that, as a result of the undertakings given by the authorities, the rest of the world stopped talking about Bahrain.

Over the phone, opposition activist Mohammed al-Maskati alleged that pro-government media falsely claimed that Shia clerical leaders were behind the mass demonstrations over the last month. To combat pro-government media bias citizen reporters became an active part of the protest movement.

YouTube footage shows unarmed protesters getting shot. The uploader of one of the videos commented that the individual who had been shot was refused medical treatment at the hospital. Another video shows him receiving medical treatment in a local home. The Bahrain government attempted to block information from citizen reporters and sites used by protesters. The Bahrain Centre for Human Rights said that Bahraini authorities were blocking a Facebook group being used for planned protests on 14 February, and that its own website had been blocked for many years.

=== Formula One race coverage ===
Media coverage surrounding the Formula One race, held 22 April 2012, once again raised the issue of media coverage and press freedom in Bahrain. It was impossible for international news organizations to cover the race without also covering the many protests arranged by democratic advocates in an effort to expose their fight to the world. The increasingly western media coverage of the race had more criticism of the Bahraini regime in the previous periods of the uprising.

Reuters had an article stating that the race would continue as planned, despite the protests and violence, but also highlighted the cancellation of the race in 2011. A CNN opinion article touted the race as an insult to democratic reformers. British newspaper, The Guardian, ran an editorial criticizing Formula One managers for continuing with the race with the current conditions in Bahrain.

The Bahrain government denounced news coverage of the protests, saying they were isolated incidents. The government also barred some foreign journalists who had been sent to cover the race, possibly fearing they would report on the protests. As a result, many international media had to work without press accreditation visas. Reporters Without Borders reported that several foreign journalists working for British and Japanese news agencies respectively were briefly arrested and released during the race.

== Domestic responses ==
=== Executive ===
Prior to the outbreak of the larger scale protests and the first domestic crackdown, King Hamad bin Isa Al Khalifa made a series of announcements to appease protesters. The government was to give .د.ب 1,000 to each family, which was interpreted by Al Jazeera as a favour to all Bahraini citizens. The King also offered to increase social spending and to release minors jailed after the August 2010 protests. On 15 February, King Hamad appeared on television and offered condolences for the deaths of two protesters, said that a parliamentary committee to investigate the deaths would be created, and stated that peaceful protests are legal. The following day the president of the Bahrain Centre for Human Rights, Nabeel Rajab, said that the King's response was not enough to satisfy protesters' demands. After the government crackdown with the support of Saudi Arabia, the king said that "An external plot has been fomented for 20 to 30 years until the ground was ripe for subversive designs...I here announce the failure of the fomented plot." He also thanked the GCC states for their intervention.

He called for "dialogue" and a direction that the King's son, Crown Prince Salman bin Hamad Al Khalifa, work on a resolution to the conflict. On 13 March, in a televised statement, Salman bin Hamad Al Khalifa renewed his call for national dialogue, promising talks would address key demands such as bolstering the power of parliament and that any deal could be put to a referendum. He said talks would also cover electoral and governmental reforms, as well as looking into claims of corruption and sectarianism.

King Hamad took a series of steps aimed at initiating a period of reconciliation following the unrest in February and March 2011. He established the Bahrain national dialogue on 1 July 2011 as a forum for the discussion and promotion of reform. The National Dialogue aims to establish "common principles for the relaunch of the political reform process," according to chairman Khalifa Al Dhahrani. The genuine substance of this proposal has been disputed by many opposition figures. – it has even been referred to disparagingly as a "chitchat room". Out of 300 participants, Al Wefaq, Bahrain's main opposition party had only 5 seats and pulled from the dialogue 2 weeks after it started and about 1-week before it ended. In total the opposition parties had only 25 out of 300 seats, Maryam al-Khawaja said.

The King also established the Bahrain Independent Commission of Inquiry (BICI), chaired by noted human rights lawyer M. Cherif Bassiouni, on 29 June 2011 to investigate the events of February and March 2011 and their consequences. The report was released on 23 November and confirmed the Bahraini government's use of torture and other forms of physical and psychological abuse on detainees. It has been criticized for not disclosing the names of individual perpetrators of abuses and extending accountability only to those who actively carried out human rights violations.

=== Legislative ===
Abdul Jalil Khalil, an Al Wefaq National Islamic Society member of parliament, described the 17 February pre-dawn police raid on the Pearl Roundabout encampment as "real terrorism", stating that "whoever took the decision to attack the protest was aiming to kill." Its MP Jassim Hussein said that "I don't think the regime is willing to meet most of our demands. But even if it does, I am not sure it will be enough to get the youth off the street. It is personal now." Following demands from young protesters for the end of the ruling regime and in protest against the deaths during demonstrations, all eighteen party MPs submitted their official resignations from parliament.

Four members of the Shura council, the upper house of parliament, Mohamed Hadi al-Halawji, Mohamed Baqir Hasan Radi, Nasser al-Mubarak and Nada Hafad resigned in protests against the crackdown. Hafad quit first accusing the government and state media of attempting to foment divisions within Bahraini society.

A parliamentary by-election was held on 24 September 2011 to replace the 18 members of the largest political party in parliament, Al Wefaq, who had resigned in protest at governmental actions. Security forces made several arrests on 23 and 24 September, closed Pearl Roundabout and attacked protestors in the village of Sanabis, who intended to march to the Pearl Roundabout.

== Role of the United Kingdom ==
In 2011, the government of the United Kingdom approved the sale of military equipment valued at more than £1m to Bahrain, following the violent crackdown on demonstrators. This included licenses for gun silencers, weapons sights, rifles, artillery and components for military training aircraft; at least some of the equipment used by Al Khalifa regime to suppress demonstrations was imported from Britain. The UK subsequently revoked many of its export licenses to Bahrain, amidst public pressure.

The 2012 status of these licenses has not been substantially documented. The United Kingdom has close ties with the Bahraini regime; indeed, in late 2012, the United Kingdom signed a defence cooperation agreement with the Bahraini government.

In June 2013, delegates from Bahrain, where allegations of torture in police custody and in prisons are widespread, were given permission to access the Yarl's Wood Immigration Removal Centre in Bedfordshire accompanied by members of the UK prison watchdog HMIP.

In September 2016, a report revealed a state-owned Belfast business had trained forces in Bahrain that used torture to secure death sentences. Northern Ireland Co-operation Overseas Ltd (NI-CO), has worked with Bahrain's police, prison guards and ombudsman's office for years. The company trains Bahrain's Interior Ministry's Ombudsman, a watchdog which knowingly refused for more than two years to investigate complaints regarding the torture of Mohamed Ramadan, a prisoner on death row who was tortured into making a false confession. NI-CO is embedded in Bahrain's internal security apparatus: a victim could be abused by NI-CO trained police, tortured in prison by NI-CO trained guards, and then have their torture allegation investigated and dismissed by the NI-CO trained ombudsman. In 2015–16, the UK Foreign Office awarded NI-CO over £900,000 out of a £2 million aid package to promote human rights reform in Bahrain.

On 13 January 2017, it emerged that a controversial multimillion-pound programme of support for Bahrain's security and justice system was being bolstered by a further £2m of British funding, despite the Persian Gulf state reversing reforms to an intelligence agency accused of torture. Two days later, the Al Khalifa regime executed 3 Bahraini activists amid public anger.

== International reactions ==
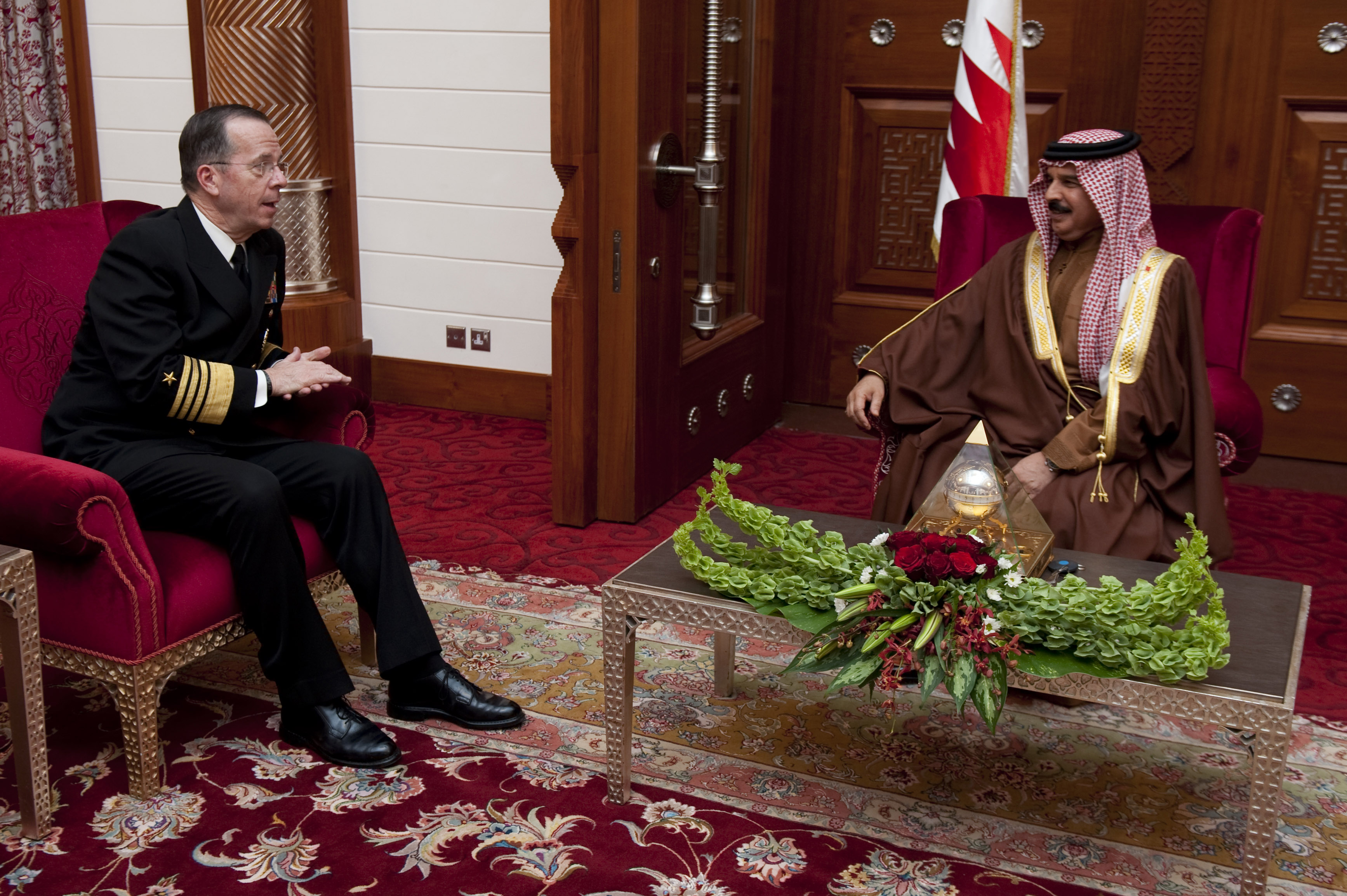
Admiral Michael Mullen, the top U.S. military officer, with King Hamad bin Isa Al Khalifa, 24 February 2011

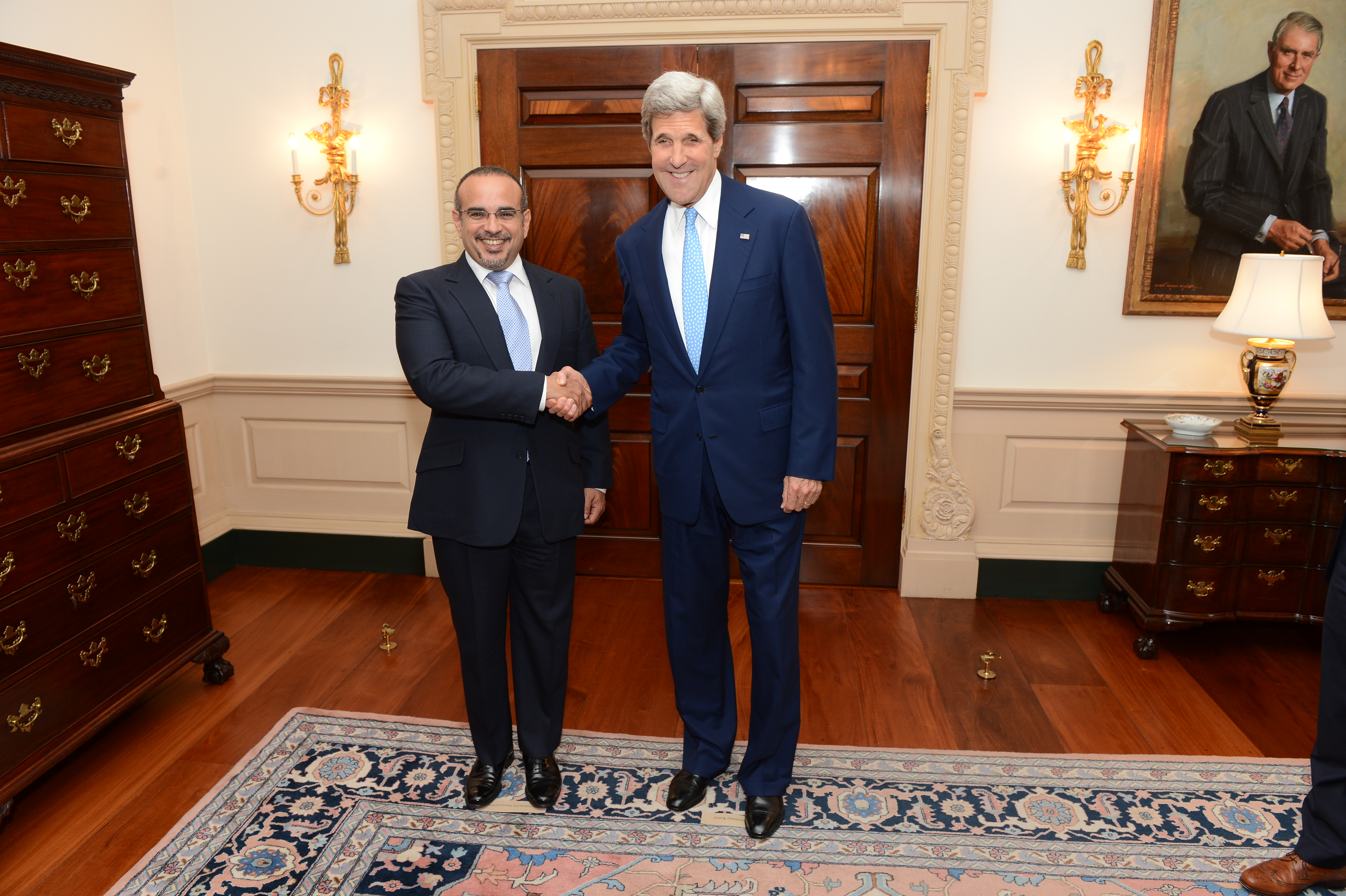
U.S. Secretary of State John Kerry shakes hands with Bahraini Crown Prince Salman bin Hamad Al-Khalifa, Washington, D.C., on 6 June 2013

The uprising has had consequences for Bahrain from the international community as well as foreign investors, including Formula One, which canceled the 2011 Bahrain Grand Prix due to instability and the outcry over the actions of the Bahraini government. Western governments and organisations have generally expressed more magnanimity toward the Bahraini government, seen as a key ally of the European Union and the United States and a bulwark against nearby Iran, than they have toward other governments accused of violating the human rights of protesters during the Arab Spring. The United States and the United Kingdom have condemned the use of violence by Bahraini authorities. They did not call for regime change or threaten sanctions.

Iran has expressed strong support for demonstrators, the majority of whom follow Shia Islam, the Iranian state religion. Relations between Tehran and Manama have cooled considerably during the uprising, with both countries expelling one another's ambassadors. Iran was joined by Iraq in opposing the Gulf Cooperation Council's military intervention in Bahrain. Allies of the Bahraini government, such as Saudi Arabia and other GCC member states, have conversely blamed Iran for inciting upheaval in the small archipelago country and questioned the legitimacy of the protesters' demands, echoing Manama's claims.

Thousands of Shia protesters arose in Iraq and Qatif, Saudi Arabia, in opposition to the Saudi-led intervention in Bahrain. The Gulf Cooperation Council and the Saudi government have defended the action as necessary to restore stability and security in the country.

Human rights groups including Amnesty International and Physicians for Human Rights have documented alleged atrocities in Bahrain and strongly condemned authorities' response to the uprising. The treatment of medical professionals accused of administering to opposition activists has been a particular source of distress to critics of the government, including both human rights advocates and journalists working in the region.

The Bahraini government's decision to establish an independent inquiry to investigate the unrest won praise from many western governments, such as the United Kingdom and the United States, as well as human rights organisations such as Amnesty International. However, many of the recommendations made in the report were not implemented, including allowing human rights organizations into the country to observe and report on the situation. In January, Brian Dooley of Human Rights First and Courtney C. Radsch and two other activists from Freedom House were denied entry to the country.

In a report released ten years after the beginning of the 2011 uprisings in Bahrain, Amnesty International highlighted that the human rights records of the country reflected no improvement. The Kingdom continued repression against dissidents, human rights defenders, journalists, opposition leaders and clerics, leaving no scope of peaceful activism or freedom of expression.

On 30 July 2021, almost 16 human rights organizations, including Amnesty International, issued a statement condemning the imprisonment of human rights defender Dr Abduljalil AlSingace and demanded his release. AlSingace, who was arrested for his role in 2011 uprising, has reportedly been on a hunger strike since 8 July 2021 to protest against the ill-treatment he had been subjected to on a regular basis and for the return of a book written by him inside the prison.

In October 2021, two Members of the European Parliament for France addressed the deteriorating health conditions of long-time detained political opposition leader Hassan Mushaima and human rights activist / blogger / engineer Dr. Abduljalil Al-Singace to the Minister of Europe and Foreign Affairs, Jean-Yves Le Drian. The MPs who brought into light the concerning issues in the country were, Mr. Michel Larive, Mr. Guillaume Garot and Ms. Maud Gatel. Ms. Gatel referred to the difficult conditions of the Mushaima and the ill-treatment he was subjected to, leading to hospitalization in July 2021. The MPs through their address, pushed the Foreign Minister to respond to the ascending allegations of human rights violations.

=== Public relations firms hired by government ===
Bahrain's government has spent millions of pounds on public relations, particularly with PR companies in Britain and the US, with which the regime has close diplomatic, military and commercial links, in an effort to try to improve its bloodied image.

The list of companies or individuals hired by or linked to the Bahrain government since the start of the uprising includes:

- Qorvis
- Bell Pottinger
- Potomac Square Group
- British military general Graeme Lamb
- United States House of Representatives member Eni Faleomavaega
- American Democratic campaign consultant Joe Trippi
- David Cracknell and Big Tent Communications
- Earl of Clanwilliam Paddy Gillford and Gardant Communications
- Good Governance Group (G3)
- Sorini, Samet & Associates
- Sanitas International
- New Century Media
- Dragon Associates
- M&C Saatchi
- Barbour, Griffith and Rogers (BGR Group)
- Policy Impact Communications and Bahrain American Council

== See also ==
- Arrest of Ali Hasan
- Bahrain: Shouting in the Dark, Al Jazeera English documentary about the uprising
- Destruction of Shia mosques during the 2011 Bahraini uprising
- Hakeem al-Araibi, footballer who fled to Australia as a refugee, subsequently the subject of an extradition order
- iRevolution: Online Warriors of the Arab Spring
- List of modern conflicts in the Middle East
- Shia–Sunni relations
