= Bahraini opposition =

Political groups against the Cabinet of Bahrain

The Bahraini opposition refers to a collection of political groups who are opposed to the Cabinet of Bahrain government and the ruling monarch of the Sunni House of Khalifa. Currently, the Bahraini opposition can be divided into the officially registered political parties, who demand reforms to the current political system, and the unregistered opposition groups. Most of the opposition comes from the majority Shia population of Bahrain.

The alliance of registered opposition parties consists of:

- Al Wefaq National Islamic Society (banned)
- National Democratic Action Society (Wa'ad, banned)
- Progressive Democratic Tribune
- Islamic Action Society (Amal, banned)
- Al Wahdawi
- Al Ekha
- Nationalist Democratic Assembly

The unlicensed opposition consists of:

- Haq Movement
- February 14 Youth Coalition
- Al Wafaa Islamic Movement
- Bahrain Freedom Movement
- National Liberation Front – Bahrain
- Al-Ashtar Brigades
- Al-Mukhtar Brigades

Since the 2011 Bahraini uprising, all opposition parties have boycotted parliamentary elections. The opposition has since failed to overthrow the Cabinet of Bahrain.

== See also ==
- Politics of Bahrain
- List of political parties in Bahrain
