= Women's rights in Bahrain =

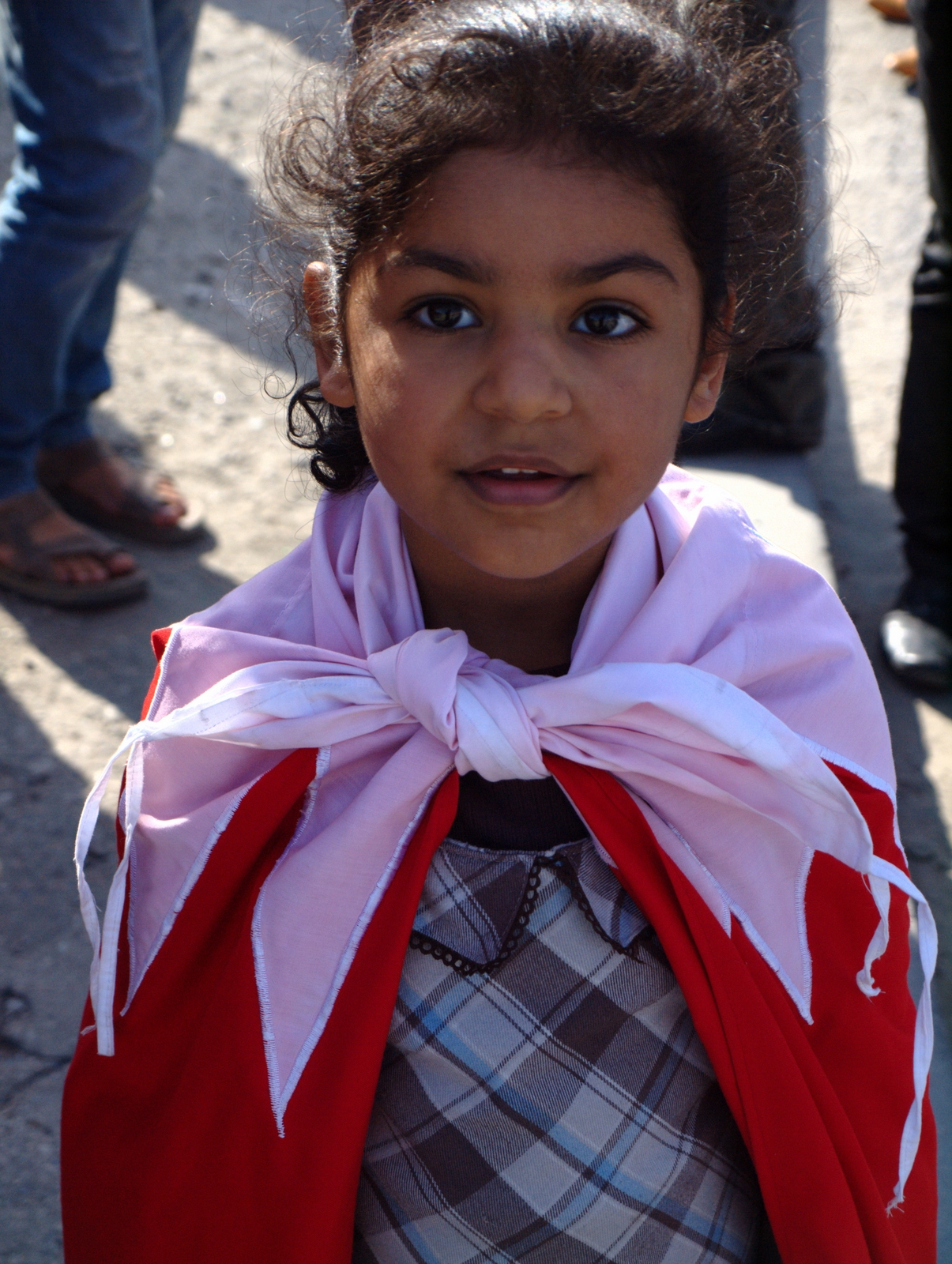
Girl in Bahrain

Women face widespread discrimination within Bahraini society and the country's political institutions. Women's rights have been a cornerstone of the political reforms initiated by King Hamad. The extension of equal political rights has been accompanied by a conscious drive to promote women to positions of authority within government. However, women in Bahrain continue to face gender inequality in many areas of life.

== Political participation ==
The move to give women the vote in 2002 was part of several wide-ranging political reforms that have seen the establishment of a democratically elected parliament and the release of political prisoners. Before 2002, women had no political rights and could neither vote in elections nor stand as candidates.

There was, however, some ambivalence towards the extension of political rights from sections of Bahraini society, not least from women themselves, with 60% of Bahraini women in 2001 opposing extending the vote to women.

Although many women stood as candidates in both municipal and parliamentary elections in 2002, none were elected to office. There were no women candidates in the lists of Islamist parties such as Al Wefaq, Al-Menbar Islamic Society and Asalah.

Following the poor performance of women candidates in the parliamentary elections, six women, including one Christian, were appointed to the upper chamber of parliament, the Shura Council. In 2004, Bahrain appointed its first female minister, Dr Nada Haffadh to the position of Health Minister, and in 2005, Dr Fatima Albalooshi, the second woman minister was appointed to the cabinet. In 2005, Houda Ezra Nonoo, a Jewish activist, who since 2004 also headed the Bahrain Human Rights Watch Society which has campaigned against the reintroduction of the death penalty in Bahrain, was also appointed to the Shura Council. In April 2005, Shura member Alees Samaan became the first woman to chair a parliamentary session in the Arab world when she chaired the Shura Council. The head of the main women's organisation, the Supreme Council for Women, Ms Lulwa Al Awadhi, has been given the title of 'honorary cabinet minister'.

In June 2006, Bahrain was elected head of the United Nations General Assembly, and appointed Haya Rashid Al Khalifa as the Assembly's President, making her the first Middle Eastern woman and the third woman in history to take over the post. Sheikha Haya is a leading Bahraini lawyer and women's rights advocate who will take over the post at a time of change for the world body. UN Secretary General Kofi Annan said of her, "I met her yesterday and I found her quite impressive. All the member states are determined to work with her and to support her, and I think she's going to bring a new dimension to the work here."

Several women's rights activists have become political personalities in Bahrain in their own right, or even gained international recognition, such as Ghada Jamsheer, who was named by Forbes magazine as one of the "ten most powerful and effective women in the Arab world" in May 2006.

Ghada Jamsheer, the most prominent women's rights activist in Bahrain has called the government's reforms "artificial and marginal". In a statement in December 2006 she said:

The government is using the family law issue as a bargaining tool with opposition Islamic groups. This is evident through the fact that the authorities raise this issue whenever they want to distract attention from other controversial political issues. While no serious steps are taken to help approve this law, although the government and its puppet National Assembly had no trouble in the last four years when it came to approving restrictive laws related to basic freedoms. All of this is why no one in Bahrain believes in Government clichés and government institutions like the High Council for Women. The government used women’s rights as a decorative tool on the international level. While the High Council for Women was used to hinder non-governmental women societies and to block the registration of the Women Union for many years. Even when the union was recently registered, it was restricted by the law on societies.

Bahrain's move was widely considered to have encouraged women's rights activists in the rest of the Persian Gulf to step up demands for equality. In 2005, it was announced that Kuwaiti women would be granted equal political rights to men.

=== 2006 Election ===
Eighteen female candidates stood at the 2006 Bahraini general election. Most of the female candidates ran for Leftist parties or as independents, with no Islamist party being represented by a woman, although salafist party Asalah was the only group to publicly oppose female candidature in parliamentary elections. Only one candidate, Lateefa Al Gaood, won; in her case by default before polling after her two opponents in her constituency dropped out of the race.

== Personal status law ==
There is no unified personal status law in Bahrain that covers matters such as divorce and child custody, so that Sharia judges have discretion in such matters. In November 2005, the Supreme Council for Women in an alliance with other women's rights activists, began a campaign for change - organising demonstrations, putting up posters across the island and carrying out a series of media interviews.

However, changing the law has been resisted by the leading Shia Islamist party, Al Wefaq, resulting in a major political showdown with women's rights activists. Al Wefaq argued that neither Chamber of Deputies elected MPs nor the government have the authority to change the law because these institutions could 'misinterpret the word of God'. Instead, the right to change the law is the sole responsibility of religious leaders.

On 9 November 2005, supporters of Al Wefaq claimed to have organised Bahrain's largest ever demonstration with 120,000 protesting against the introduction of the Personal Status Law, and for the maintenance of status quo with each religious group having their own divorce and inheritance laws. On the same day, an alliance of women's rights organisations held a smaller rally calling for the unified law, which attracted 500 supporters.

The issue of the introduction of a unified personal status law has divided civil society into two camps, with women's rights and human rights groups wanting its introduction, opposed by Shia Islamist groups in alliance with the Wahabbi Asalah:

For:

- Supreme Council for Women
- Bahrain Human Rights Society
- Bahrain Human Rights Watch Society
- Bahrain Women's Union
- Women's Petition
- Bahrain Young Ladies Association
- National Democratic Action
- Al Sharaka (Bahrain branch of Amnesty International)
- Bahrain Centre for Human Rights

Against:

- Al Wefaq
- Asalah
- Islamic Action Party
- Islamic Awareness Society
- Capital Transparency Society

== See also ==
- Be-Free
- Women in Bahrain
- Munira Fakhro
- Sawsan Taqawi

General:

- Human rights in Bahrain
- Women in Arab societies
- Women in Islam
