= Fouad Siyadi =

Bahraini politician of the Huwala tribe

- فؤاد سيادي
- Born: Fouad bin Mohammed Jassim Siyadi; January 1, 1955 (age 70); Muharraq, Bahrain
- Education: Bachelor of Arts in Economics
- Alma mater: Damascus University
- Occupation: politician
- Years active: 1973—Present
- Organization(s): National Democratic Action Society, Popular Front for the Liberation of Bahrain, Popular Front for the Liberation of the Occupied Arabian Gulf
- Known for: Last Secretary-General of the National Democratic Action Society
- Criminal charges: Incitement of murder of Sheikh Abdullah Al-Madani
- Criminal penalty: Three years' imprisonment
- Children: Muhammad
- Father: Mohammad Jassim Siyadi

Fouad Mohammed Jassim Siyadi (Arabic: فؤاد محمد جاسم سيادي, born in 1955 in Muharraq, Bahrain) is a left-wing Bahraini politician of the Huwala tribe. He was the fourth and last secretary-general of the National Democratic Action Society (Wa’ad), the first left-wing political association recognized by a ruling regime in the Arab states of the Persian Gulf until its dissolution in 2017.

== Early life and education ==
Born in 1955 in Muharraq, Siyadi belonged to a family that settled there at the beginning of the 19th century. One of the most famous pearl hunting dynasties, it owned a fleet of dhows which produced a high annual yield.

He graduated from Al-Hidaya Al-Khalifia Boys School in 1973. That year, he began university studies in Cairo, then settled in Damascus to complete an economics degree at Damascus University.

== Political life until 1999 ==
In high school, Siyadi participated in a movement to form a branch of the National Union of Bahrain Students. In the 1970s, his political career began as he interacted with representatives of several parties of the day, especially the most prominent left-wing ones, the Popular Front for the Liberation of Bahrain and the Popular Front for the Liberation of the Occupied Arabian Gulf. As a university student, he continued leading student groups and led the National Union of Bahrain Students’ Damascus branch until his 1976 deportation from Syria over his objection to the Syrian occupation of Lebanon.

After Siyadi’s deportation from Syria, he went to Baghdad to continue university studies but was rejected by the Iraqi authorities due to differences between the Bahraini student movement and broader Arab student movement. In November 1976, therefore, he returned to Bahrain to visit his family and apply for universities in India, but the authorities arrested him for three years on charges of inciting the assassination of the Shiite opposition figure Sheikh Abdullah Al-Madani. This spurious charge was part of a campaign against the local left by the head of the National Security Agency, the British Ian Henderson. During Siyadi’s imprisonment, he was tortured and nearly died. He was detained with Muhammad Ghulum Bucheeri and Saeed al-Onawaiti, who died from the torture. Siyadi was released in 1980.

He then went to Syria to complete his studies, taking over the presidency of the National Union of Bahraini Students in 1981. In 1985, he graduated from the Damascus University Faculty of Economics, leading the Union for some time before he decided to return home. He was arrested for a time by Syrian authorities at Damascus International Airport before being deported. He was arrested again upon his return and held for a few months.

After his release, Siyadi worked in several positions in the Isa Town Cooperative Society, up to the level of general manager. During the 1990s uprising in Bahrain, he was dismissed as the Board of Directors of the Cooperative Society was dissolved by the Ministry of Labor. Afterward, he worked in public relations and media through the International Public Relations Company, then moved to the United Arab Emirates, where he served as general manager of the Fujairah Cooperative Society and ran the Abu Dhabi Fishermen Cooperative Society under the auspices of the Emirate of Abu Dhabi until the beginning of 2000.

== Political life from 2000 on ==
In 2000, Siyadi returned to Bahrain to participate in the democratic breakthrough, helping found the National Democratic Action Society and chairing the first board of directors of its Muharraq chapter. By 2010, he had become Deputy Secretary-General of the Society’s Assembly and led the initiative to boycott the parliamentary and municipal elections of 2010 given his suspicion that certain parties’ candidates would be barred from fairly competing. During the months before the election, Siyadi criticized the election’s integrity almost daily, but Secretary-General Ibrahim Sharif ultimately decided to keep the party in the races despite later claiming to have been obstructed by various means by the authorities. During the 2011 Bahraini parliamentary by-elections The party did boycott after all in the wake of human rights abuses during the Bahraini uprising of 2011. In 2012, Siyadi participated in a delegation including all six opposition parties to an event known as the National Consensus Dialogue. At the end of the negotiations with the authorities, the results did not meet the Society’s expectations.

On November 22, 2016, Siyadi was chosen by acclamation to be the fourth secretary-general of the Society, succeeding Radhi Al-Mosawi. Siyadi decided to boycott the 2018 Bahraini general election, as in 2011. The Society was in a precarious position during Siyadi’s tenure in the wake of its leading protests in 2011 in alliance with Al-Wefaq National Islamic Society and four other parties, to which the regime responded with monitoring, dissolution, and ultimately liquidation of its funds for transfer to the state treasury by the Court of Cassation. The final court decision was handed down on January 21, 2019, declaring violations of several articles of the Political Associations Law of 2008. The violations were cited as referring to Article 6 (“non-rejection of violence” in a reference to perpetrators of a bombing that killed three police as “martyrs of the homeland”) and Article 4, Paragraph 7 (“non-collusion with organizations hostile to the state” in its “rejection of the 2002 constitution as lapsed and illegal”).

== Personal life ==
Siyadi is married and has a son named Muhammad.
