= Munira Fakhro =

Bahraini academic

- منيرة فخرو
- Relatives: Layla Fakhro (cousin)

Academic background
- Education: Columbia University (PhD)
- Thesis: Increasing the participation of women in the labor force in Bahrain: A policy study (1987)

Academic work
- Institutions: University of Bahrain

Dr. Munira Fakhro (Arabic: منيرة فخرو) is a Bahraini academic and was a candidate in Bahrain's 2006 general election for Wa'ad, the country's largest leftist political party.

== Early and personal life ==
Fakhro grew up in British-ruled Bahrain, and was one of five Bahraini girls chosen to receive a high school education abroad in Beirut. She studied Arabic Literature as an undergraduate before pursuing higher education in the United States, where she received her Doctorate in Social Policy, Planning and Administration from Columbia University. Her doctoral thesis was titled "Increasing the participation of women in the labor force in Bahrain: A policy study".

She is a Sunni Muslim and a cousin of Layla Fakhro.

== Academic career ==
Upon returning to Bahrain after completing her PhD, Fakhro worked for the Ministry of Labour as head of the welfare department before leaving for an academic position at the University of Bahrain. In 1987, she began teaching "sociology, social work, and social development" at the Department of General Studies at the University.

Fakhro is an associate professor at the University of Bahrain. She has conducted research on gender, citizenship and civil society in the Persian Gulf states at the Centre for Middle East Studies, Harvard University. She has published works on Bahrain, including issues related to women, civil society and democratisation.

Fakhro was a board member of the Bahrain Academic Society and the Supreme Council for Women. She was a member of the advisory board for the Arab Human Development Report 2004.

== 1990s activism ==
During the 1990s uprising in Bahrain, Fakhro was a signatory to the 1994 Popular Petition to the Amir calling for the restoration of the parliament and the 1973 constitution. This was followed by another petition in 1995 signed by 350 women calling for the restoration of democracy and an end to torture. As a result, the government of Bahrain demanded that she withdraw her name from the petition or be sacked from her position at the University of Bahrain. She refused to withdraw her name and was sacked along with several other signatories.

After losing her job, Fakhro moved to the United States, where she worked as a visiting scholar at Columbia University (beginning in 1997) and at Harvard University.

Fakhro returned to Bahrain in 2001, when King Hamad carried out a general amnesty for all political prisoners and exiles and Fakhro was restored to her job at Bahrain University. Fakhro was appointed by the King's wife, Sabika bint Ibrahim Al Khalifa, to the advisory board of the Supreme Council for Women.

== Political career ==
=== 2006 Bahrain parliamentary elections ===
Fakhro ran for election in the parliamentary elections held in Bahrain on 25 November 2006. She was Vice President of the leftist Waad, and was the only female candidate to be endorsed by Shia Islamist party Al Wefaq. Fakhro stood in the middle class Isa Town constituency, where she ran against Dr Salah Ali MP, a member of the Muslim Brotherhood's political wing, Al-Menbar Islamic Society.

On the issue of women's rights, Fakhro has argued that it is a core component of democracy:

"You cannot separate democracy from other women’s causes … I believe that men and women should work together – for women or men or the whole society. We have so many men who believe in such issues (women’s rights), who work with us either at the university as scholars or at the political association.” Her views on women's rights mean that she has clashed with Islamists over their opposition to a unified law to protect women's rights: “Religious leaders are against the family law. I am against two separate laws for the Sunni and Shia – we will be separated more."

On extremism:

"If you want to fight extremism, you have to have a strong government. Democracy will bring extremists in, but in a controlled way – like Hamas in Palestine and the Muslim Brothers in Egypt. There are so many grey areas in democracy, but you must accommodate every group. This is a positive policy. They have to deal with things legally. I think things are moving towards such partial openness."

She described her appointment by Shaikha Sabeeka bint Ibrahim Al Khalifa, wife of King Hamad, to the Supreme Council for Women as “I think we are at the beginning of this movement in civil society. In the Council, we have a good strategy. To apply it will take a long time by I think it should involve all women’s associations."

On 22 October, the Khaleej Times reported that female candidates in the 2006 elections were receiving anonymous threats and mobile phone messages telling them to withdraw to 'avoid clashing with Islamic principles'. Dr Fakhro complained to the Supreme Council for Women and the Ministry of Islamic Affairs about the texts, and alleged that they are coming from Salafi circles strongly opposed to women's participation. Bahraini Salafist party, Asalah, is opposed to women standing for parliament.

=== 2011-2016 ===
Fakhro remained a member of the Waad during the 2011 Bahraini uprising.

By 2016, Fakhro's home had been firebombed twice.

== Publications ==
=== Chapters ===
- Fakhro, Munira (December 1996). "Eleven: Gulf Women and Islamic Law". In Yamani, Mai; Allen, Andrew (eds.). Feminism and Islam: Legal and Literary Perspectives. NYU Press. pp. 251–262. ISBN 978-0-8147-9681-8.
- Fakhro, Munira (2010-09-13). "10 The role of women in industrialization in the Gulf: The case of Bahrain". In Seznec, Jean-Francois; Kirk, Mimi (eds.). Industrialization in the Gulf: A Socioeconomic Revolution. Routledge. ISBN 978-1-136-93580-0.

== See also ==
- University of Bahrain
- Women's political rights in Bahrain
- Bahrain election 2006 women candidates
- Layla Fakhro
- Ibrahim Sharif
