= Female candidates in the 2006 Bahraini general election =

Women in politics (salafist stance)

Women candidates of the 2006 Bahrain election, which took place on November 25, 2006 were reported to have received numerous threats from Islamic Salafist and other factions to prevent them from taking part. In all, eighteen female candidates of various political stances and views took part after recent changes to the political system in 2001 allowed women to not only run as candidates, but also gave them the right to vote.

== History of women in local politics ==
In March 1999 Sheikh Hamad bin Isa al-Khalifa came to power in Bahrain and national liberalisation quickly followed with the passing of the National Charter of Action in which many personal freedoms were clearly laid out. A referendum was held on February 14–15, 2001 through which the charter was approved. The legislation therein came into full force on February 14, 2002, the year after the women of Bahrain were given the right to vote and stand for office. In a report in early 2001 it was noted that there were only four female majlis, and none before this time. The majority of women who worked for the state still did so only in a supporting capacity In 2002 when women went to the polls for the first time, no women candidates succeeded in being elected despite 10% of approximately 300 candidates being women, although one woman, Lateefa Al Gaood, lost in a run off to salafist candidate, Jassim Al Saeedi.

Women candidates complained that they were at a disadvantage because none of the popular Islamist parties have backed their candidacies, they cannot campaign in mosques, and social perceptions hinder them still.

In Bahrain, political parties are illegal and only allowed to be known as political associations. Despite this these political associations have regular powers to put forward candidates for election and act as a parliamentary bloc. The law makes clear that financial resources of political associations should come from membership fees and contributions and from revenues of their investments in the Kingdom as defined by their internal regulations. A political society is under no circumstances allowed to accept any contribution, advantage or benefit from any foreigner or any foreign entity or international organisation. Women candidates therefore relied on financial support from sources such as the women's rights body, the Supreme Council for Women, which has also provided training to candidates.

On October 22, the Khaleej Times reported that women candidates were receiving anonymous threats and mobile phone messages telling them to withdraw from the elections to 'avoid clashing with Islamic principles'.

Information Minister Dr Mohammed Abdul Ghaffar described the country's elections as a historic day for Bahrain:

"The turnout was high. The people of Bahrain visited the polling stations to exercise their democratic rights and vote for the candidates of their choice," he said.

== Leading female candidates ==
Only one of the eighteen women running in this election won a seat. Where run-offs are mentioned, these took place on December 2. Below is a non-comprehensive list of some of the women candidates in the election.

=== Lateefa Al Gaood ===
Lateefa Al Gaood became the first female candidate to be elected to Bahrain's parliament when she won by default after the other two candidates in her constituency in the south of Bahrain withdrew from the race in the middle of October before campaigning began. She was also the first woman anywhere in the Gulf to be elected in a legislative general election. She represents the sixth constituency, Hawar, of the Southern Governorate, in the 40-member Chamber of Deputies. Due to her previous failure she stood for a different constituency in 2006 to increase her chances. Ms Al Gaood is a British educated civil servant, who worked for the Ministry of Finance.

=== Dr Munira Fakhro ===
Former Harvard academic and Vice President of the ex-Marxist National Democratic Action, she stood for Isa Town against Al-Menbar Islamic Society's Dr Salah Alibut was defeated with 3,169 votes. Her campaign during her candidacy included promises to create a link between education and employment and working for better retirement funds and housing. She stood as part of the National Democratic Action Society, also known as Wa'ad Society. She is an associate professor at the University of Bahrain, and her academic interests encompass women, civil society and democracy in the Gulf region.

=== Fawzia Zainal ===
Head of Programmes at Bahrain Radio and Television Corporation, Ms Zainal is a Sunni Muslim who contested a constituency in Riffafor which she received 2,599 votes and was defeated. She is vice-president of the Bahrain Transparency Society, and in October 2006 signed an opposition petition calling for an investigation into allegations that powerful figures in the government were fuelling sectarianism.

Ms Zainal said after her defeat:

"I have no regrets about my defeat. I have learned from this experience. It is disappointing that it is still considered a taboo for women here to contest elections. I want the new deputies to work for the welfare of the people."

She was reported to have received particularly negative treatment during the campaign in the run up to the election:

"'Members of the society are distributing video tapes in which Kuwaiti religious leaders oppose the participation of women in elections,' said Fawzia whose posters were defaced and tent vandalised."

=== Jameela Al Sammak ===
Dr Jameela Al Sammak stood in the second constituency of the Capital Governorate and she is a member of the Women's Future Association.

Critics commented about the style with which she faced her candidacy:

"Dr Jameela Al Sammak did it with extraordinary panache. In fact, she took the battle to a public ground and did not hesitate to tell the people about the relentless onslaught on her and on her team."

=== Moza Sabt ===
Moza Sabt is an ex-teacher who stood in Muharraq. During her campaign she said:

"Only good education prepares people for the future. When a person is educated, it is much easier to face problems like unemployment"

=== Hoda Al Mutawa ===
Hoda Al Mutawa was a candidate in conservative Muharraq, an area that in 2002 was dominated by Asalah and Al-Menbar Islamic Society. Ms Al Mutawa pledged to campaign on securing adequate housing, providing medical insurance, helping the unemployed and promoting the personal status law.

=== Ameenah Al Hassan ===
Ameenah Al Hassan was a candidate in the sixth constituency in the Northern Governorate.

=== Siham Al Bubshait ===
Siham Al Bubshait stood in the second constituency of the Southern Governorate.

=== Shahzaleen Khamees ===
Lawyer Shahzaleen Khamees ran for the National Unity Bloc, an alliance backed by the Left-wing Progressive Democratic Tribune, in the capital, Manama.

Sabah Al Dosari and Khadija Al Kahtani were also known to be women candidates in this election.

== See also ==
- 2006 Bahraini parliamentary election
