= Abdul Nabi Salman =

Bahraini politician

- عبد النبي سلمان

Member of the Council of Representatives (Bahrain)
- In office 2002–2006
- Monarch: Hamad bin Isa Al Khalifa
- Prime Minister: Khalifa bin Salman Al Khalifa
- Constituency: Second District of the Central Governorate

Member of the Council of Representatives
- Incumbent
- Assumed office 2018
- Monarch: Hamad bin Isa Al Khalifa
- Prime Minister: Khalifa bin Salman Al Khalifa, Salman, Crown Prince of Bahrain
- Preceded by: Ruaa Al Hayiki
- Constituency: Sixth District of the Northern Governorate

Personal details
- Born: Abdul Nabi Salman Ahmed Nasser; 1960 (age 65–66) A'ali, Bahrain
- Occupation: trade unionist

Abdul Nabi Salman Ahmed Nasser (Arabic: عبد النبي سلمان أحمد ناصر, born in 1960 in A'ali) is a Bahraini politician. He was sworn into the Council of Representatives on December 12, 2018 to represent the Sixth District of the Northern Governorate.

== Biography ==
Salman earned a Bachelor of Arts in Statistics from Bangalore University in 1981. He obtained a diploma in Sales and Marketing Development in 1989, a Higher Diploma in Management and Marketing in 1996, and specialized courses in public relations, promotion, and advertising.

As the head of the Press and Publications Department at Gulf Air, he founded the airline’s union. He belongs to the Bahrain Economists Society and the Bahrain Transparency Society.

In 2012, he was elected Secretary-General of the left-wing Progressive Democratic Tribune (Al-Minbar) party, succeeding Dr. Hassan Madan.

== Political career ==
Salman decided to run for the Council of Representatives in the 2002 Bahraini general election, in which he ran to represent the Second District of the Central Governorate for Al-Minbar. He won 632 votes for 22.28% in the first round, necessitating a runoff in which he won 1,327 votes for 54.93%, defeating Muhammad Al Asfour.

In the 2006 Bahraini general election for the same district, Salman lost reelection in the first round with 2,396 votes for 27.81% to Abdullah Al-A’ali of the Shiite Al Wefaq party.

In the 2018 Bahraini general election, he ran instead for the Sixth District of the Northern Governorate, winning 2,662 votes for 56.20% of the vote in the first round. Salman was elected First Deputy Speaker of Parliament in a 24-16 vote over Ahmed Al-Salloum. Ghazi Al Rahma and Fadhel Al Sawad had been eliminated in the first round.
