= 2006 Bahraini general election =

- 25 November 2006 (first round); 2 December 2006 (second round)
- All 40 seats in the Council of Representatives
Party	Leader	Seats
Al Wefaq	Ali Salman	17
Al-Menber	Salah Abdulrahman	7
Al Asalah	Ghanim Al Buaneen	5
Independents	–	11
This lists parties that won seats. See the complete results below.

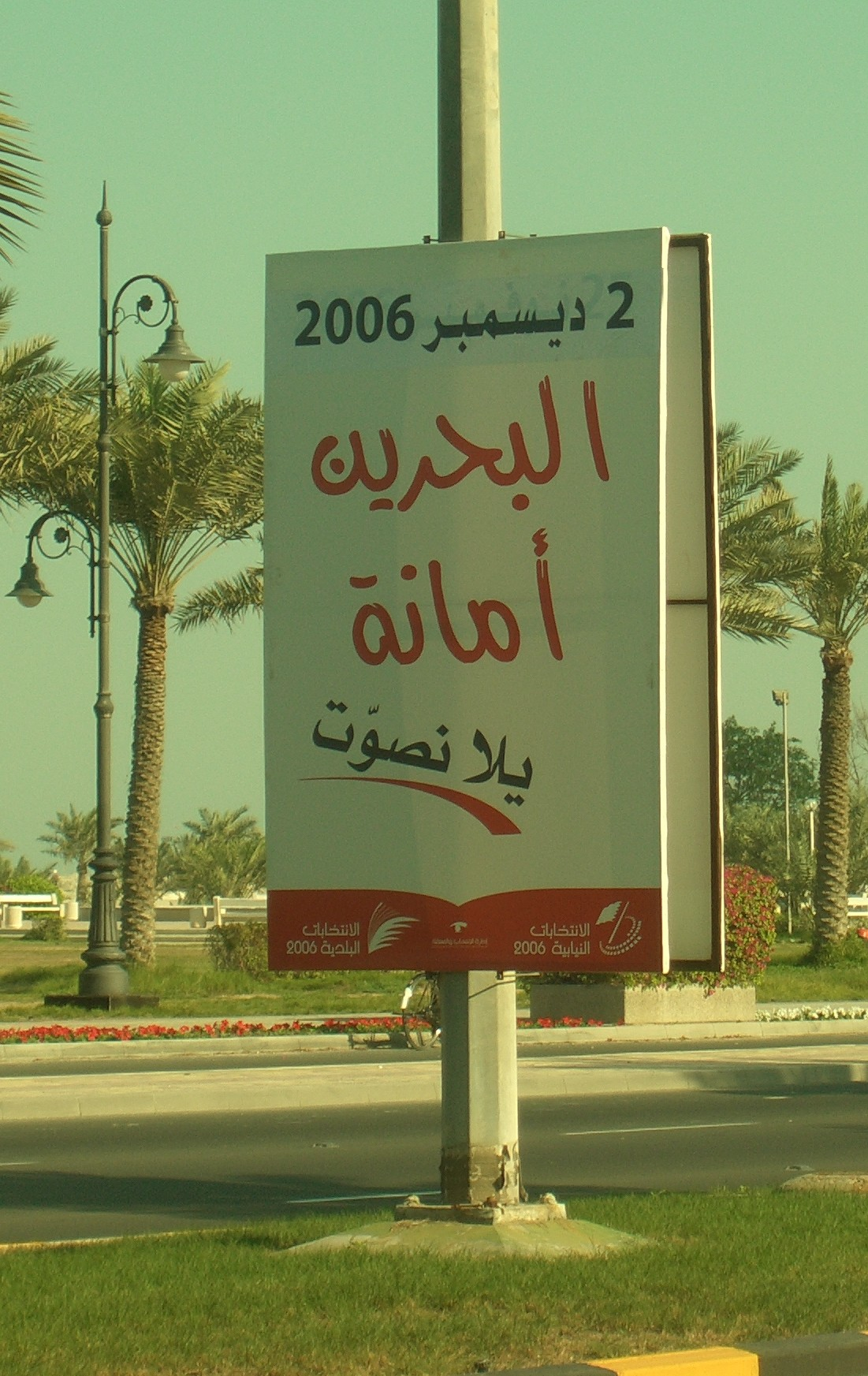
Advertisement urging Bahrainis to vote in the 2 December run-offs

General elections were held in Bahrain in November and December 2006 to elect the forty members of the Council of Representatives. The first round of voting was held on 25 November, with a second round on 2 December 2006.

Voter turnout was 72% in the first round, in which Shi'a and Sunni Islamists dominated, winning a clean sweep of the 29 seats that were decided in the first round, while liberal and ex-communist MPs lost all their seats. Four candidates of the left-wing National Democratic Action (also known as Wa'ad) made it through to second round run-off, which decided the remaining 11 seats.

The elections were preceded by a major political realignment that saw the four opposition parties that boycotted the 2002 elections agree to take part in the political process. These included the Shia Islamist party, Al Wefaq, the radical Shia Islamist Islamic Action Society, the left-wing National Democratic Action Society and the Nationalist Democratic Rally Society. To meet the challenge posed by Al Wefaq, the two main Sunni Islamist parties, the salafist Asalah and the Muslim Brotherhood-affiliated Al-Menber Islamic Society, agreed to form a coalition to maximise their votes.

== Campaign ==
With Al Wefaq entering the political arena after boycotting the 2002 elections, competing candidates turned their attention to its agenda, particularly the party's relationship with the highest Shia religious body in Bahrain, the Islamic Scholars Council. Several candidates claimed that they were being forced out of the race, including Jassim Abdulaal of the Economists Bloc, by influential clerics who told their congregations whom to vote for. The criticism became more pointed after the Council described Al Wefaq as the "Bloc of Believers".

The Shia Islamist Al Amal, which has close links with the "Shirazi faction", was most specific in its criticism. Its head, Sheikh Mohammad Ali Al Mahfood, complained: "The Islamic Scholars Council should not dictate how people vote and should allow them to make their own personal choices about the most competent candidates. It looks as if the Council has turned into a partisan umbrella for a specific society and this diminishes its authority and confines its influence. We have often blamed the government for appointing 40 members to the bi-cameral parliament, yet we are doing the same thing and hijacking the people's right to make their own choices."

Al Wefaq in turn denied that it intimidated opponents; its leader, Sheikh Ali Salman, told a press conference "Let's make it clear to those campaigning against us, that we respect our competitors, whoever they are, and would do nothing to harm them."

Al Wefaq campaigned for greater government subsidies for low income families, with the party's candidate, Dr Jasim Husain, who is the University of Bahrain Research Deanship Economic Research Unit Head, saying "People today have to pay rent, electricity, telephone, Internet and water bills, in addition to other fees. They have to buy food, clothing, pay for car installments and even recreation. But this is impossible, because many fall short as their salaries are not enough." Dr Husain said that government complacency was a problem, especially after the latest United Nations Human Development Report 2006 ranks Bahrain 39th out of 177 countries and second only to Kuwait in the Arab world. Dr Husain said that the country could do better by looking to the future: "The government should be giving more money to education and training, rather than defence and police. We are not saying that defence and police are not important, but they should be given less attention."

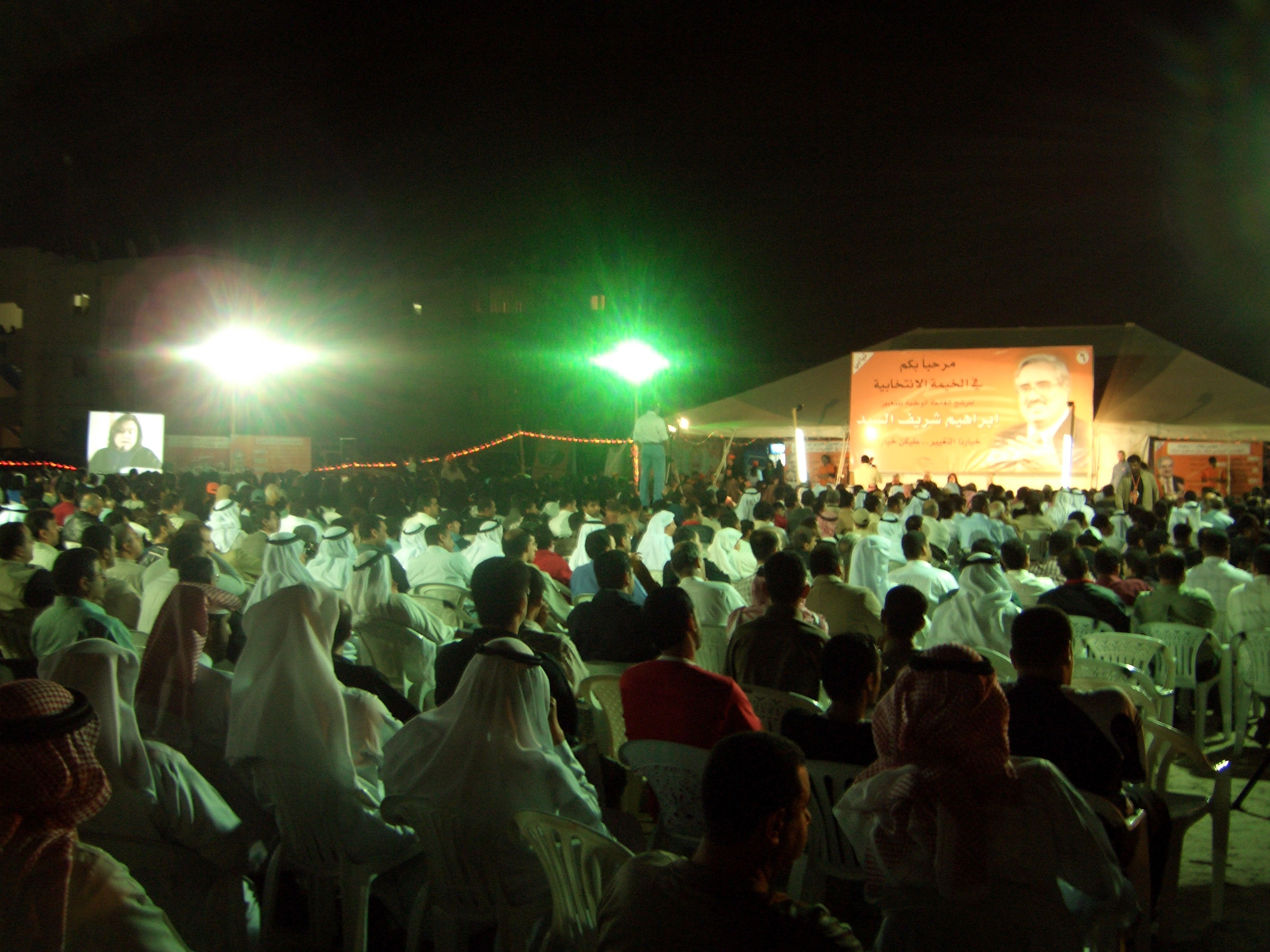
Election meeting for Wa'ad candidate Ibrahim Sharif

The government responded to criticism on social welfare by announcing that it will put forward legislation so that Bahrain becomes the first Arab country to introduce unemployment benefit. According to economist, Alaa al-Yousuf, Bahrain has an unemployment rate of 15%, with women very over-represented. The government's announcement is interpreted as pre-emptive of an expected move by the new parliament to draft legislation to bring in unemployment benefit, which would allow MPs to claim the credit. The introduction of unemployment benefit was not supported by all candidates, National Unity Bloc candidate in Hamad Town, Abbas Ayed, portrayed the move as symptomatic of a government approach that recognises problems after they happen, but has failed to take preventative measures to stop them in the first place. Instead, Mr Ayed called for greater investment in training and education for Bahraini workers: "Train them and remove expatriate workers and see if they can do their jobs or not."

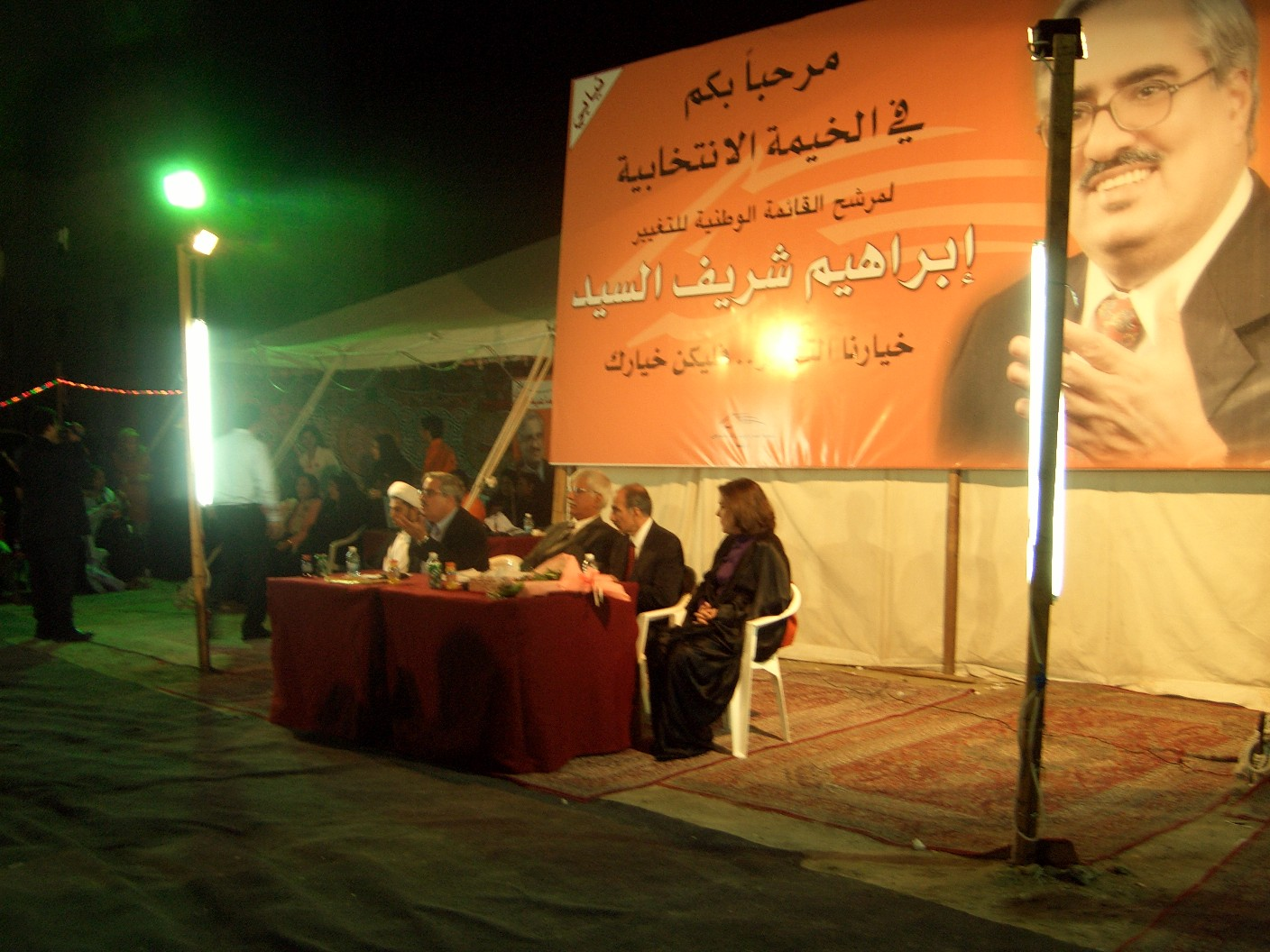
Opposition leaders at Wa'ad election meeting. Ali Salman on the left end of the table, Munira Fakhro on the right

Al Wefaq and the other three parties that boycotted the 2002 poll have stated that they will use their presence in the 2006 parliament to campaign for a single elected legislature, and Al Wefaq has gone further and committed itself to reform of the judiciary. The party wants to see the Supreme Judiciary Council elected by all the judges in the country instead of being appointed by its Supreme Chairman King Hamad. Al Wefaq candidate Sayed Haidar Al Sitri has proposed that the elected president of the council should be independent ensure and neither influenced by the National Assembly nor the government, saying: "Bahrain is developing and also its judiciary system, which we hope will be completely independent."

The outgoing parliamentary speaker, Khalifa Al Dhahrani, beat a strong challenge in his constituency in Riffa from Sheikh Salman Bin Saqr Al Khalifa, who is a member of the Al Khalifa family and journalist with the Al Wasat newspaper. Sheikh Salman said that as a member of the royal family he hopes his decision to contest the elections will stimulate other members of the ruling families in the Persian Gulf countries to contest national elections and "end a tradition of not running in public polls."

Al Dhahrani, who is backed by Sunni Islamists, has a further challenge in retaining the speakership after his previous performance was criticised for failing to control radical Islamist MPs in the debating chamber. Al Wefaq leader Ali Salman may run for speaker post elections.

Al Wefaq was skillful in how it criticised the government, taking it to task over its track record in providing goods and services to Bahrainis rather than questioning its political legitimacy per se - for instance, in a televised debate on Bahrain TV, Ali Salman accused the administration of being "lazy", and failing to meet its obligations in education and employment. This is a theme that Al Wefaq is likely to continue in parliament with Ali Salman promising, "If we find the necessary cooperation [from government], we will be highly positive. But if we find that the government or one of its ministers is stalling people's interests, then we will hold them responsible."

== Women candidates ==
A large number of women candidates contested the poll, with one female candidate, Lateefa Al Gaood, winning her seat by default even before polling began when her two opponents withdrew from the race. This made her the first woman to serve in an elected parliament in the Persian Gulf. Critics accused the government of engineering her victory because it wanted to see a woman win and they were aware that it was highly unlikely any woman would be elected in the voting.

Several female candidates faced an orchestrated campaign of political abuse against them through text messages telling them to withdraw from the contest and one woman had her election marquee burnt to the ground. Women's organisations have been strongly criticised for not doing enough to support female candidates; liberal columnist Sawsan Al Sha'er commented, "We have seen business leaders, liberal thinkers and even foreign religious scholars move from one tent to the other to interact with constituents or deliver lectures. But we have not seen any women's organisation do or say anything throughout this month. We had high expectations because the elections are a golden opportunity for women to highlight their programmes and ambitions. But instead, we see that the women's societies have withdrawn into their shells."

The Supreme Council for Women activist and co-author of the Arab Human Development Report, Dr Muneera Fakhro was standing for the Leftist National Democratic Action (of which she is vice-president) in suburban Isa Town. The NDA along with the National Unity Bloc were the only two parties fielding female candidates; both parties have their origins in Bahrain's Marxist movement. However, all parties with the exception of salafist Asalah publicly stated that they do not object to women MPs. Asalah for its part said that its position reflected its "honesty" and inferred that opponents are being hypocritical.

== Controversy ==
Business-political confluence

The domination of politics by religious parties has seen concerns raised by the business community that their voice will be marginalised. The agenda of both Al Wefaq and the Sunni Islamists has been portrayed by opponents as "statist", while there are concerns that the government may be tempted to buy off opponents in parliament through traditional clientelism by providing their supporters with jobs in the civil service, thus further bloating the public sector. Ironically, business representatives, being both liberal and anti-sectarian, tend to have most in common with parties on the Left of Bahrain's political spectrum, such as the National Democratic Action. Perhaps symbolically, the NDA's leader, Ibrahim Sharif, is a former banker. However, with Left-wing and liberal parties faring badly in the polls, business groups have been urged not to back specific parties and risk alienating opponents, but to lobby MPs after the election to ensure they understand businesses' concerns.

Al Sistani's intervention

The Leading Shia authority, Grand Ayatollah Al Sistani advised Bahraini Shi'a to participate in the poll, in a move similar to the edict received in 2002 by Salafist leader, Adel Al Mouawda, from Sunni religious authorities in Saudi Arabia that allowed him and other Sunnis to vote and run in the elections.

Shia religious scholar Sheikh Isa Qassim has been urging voters to go to turn out in the polls. "Boycotting the elections would be a grave mistake," said the fatwa that the Shiite establishment. According to a poll in Al Wasat newspaper, 1.9% of voters will heed calls for a boycott being made by a splinter group of Salafists and the Haq Movement. Turnout was thus expected to be "fairly high" according to a survey by Al Wasat, which predicts that it should be significantly up on 2002's 53% participation rate.

Ex-Al Qaeda suspects contesting poll

Several individuals contesting the election had faced accused of links with international terrorism. In a bitter battle in Riffa, extremist Salafist, Jassim Al Saeedi, was being challenged from the Right by Muhejeudeen Mohmood Mohyeden, who claimed that the government branded him an Al Qaeda operative. Mr Mohyeden says that the allegations arose from his role as a volunteer fighting against the Soviet occupation of Afghanistan, but that instead of undermining his campaign the claims helped to raise his profile in the conservative constituency.

Municipal candidate, Muhieddin Khan, (who is backed by the National Justice Movement) spent most of the election campaign before a Bahraini court charged with planning terror attacks. Mr Khan, along with three other alleged members of the cell, was only found not guilty on 20 November 2006, less than five days before the poll. After the verdict Mr Khan announced that he is suing the Bahraini government for BD700,000 for harassment.

On the Shia Right, Al Amal is seen as the direct descendant of the group that plotted a coup d'état in Bahrain in 1981; the party's leaders only returned to public life in Bahrain after they returned from exile or were released from prison in 2001.

Other controversies

The political campaign began in controversial circumstances in September 2006, with the Bandargate scandal, in which it was alleged that a secret organization of government officials were planning to rig the elections to marginalize the Shia community. Under the plan, an alleged secret organization set up a slush fund to finance candidates sympathetic to the government, with sums of hundreds of dinars given to several candidates in order to lessen the number of seats won by Al Wefaq. The plot led to crisis talks between King Hamad and the leaders of Bahrain's political parties, as well as senior clerics, such as Sheikh Isa Qassim. After being given assurances from the King, opposition groups announced that they would continue to participate in the poll.

Subsequently, poll monitors, the Bahrain Transparency Society, registered 79 violations ranging from oversized banners and posters, out-of-place billboards, attacks on the character of contenders, dissemination of lies and rumours, anti-women calls and the use of mosques to promote candidates. Opponents of prominent Leftist candidate, Dr Munira Fakhro, have sought to use text messaging to try to portray her as anti-religious, receiving backing from by both the government and Al Wefaq, and drawn attention to her personal wealth. Dr Fakhro dismissed the attacks: "Claiming that only a poor person can sympathise with the poor is ludicrous and illogical."

The only member of the royal family to contest the elections, Sheikh Salman bin Saqer Al-Khalifa, has alleged that his opponent in Riffa, Khalifa Al Dhahrani, has the backing of a Kuwaiti tribe which should not be allowed to vote under the electoral rules but will be casting their votes for Al Dhahrani.

The Haq Movement boycotted the 2006 elections, arguing that it is unconstitutional under the 1976 constitution, that the electoral districts have been heavily gerrymandered to favor the desires of the Al Khalifa royal family, and that mass illegal political naturalization has taken place.

On 16 November 2006, two activists for the Haq Movement, Dr. Mohammed Saeed and Hussain Abdelrazaq Alhabashi, were arrested by Bahraini police for distributing material urging Bahrainis to boycott the November 25 elections.

== Expectations and reactions ==
According to the Dubai-based Gulf News, the liberal parties feared that the victory of Islamist parties would restrict personal freedoms.

There are also concerns that domination of parliament by Islamists from two different sects arguing contentious issues in the chamber may further encourage sectarianism. Bahrain's leading salafist politician, Sheikh Adel Al Mouwdah, has sought to play down the fears and welcomed the prospect of working with Al Wefaq and other Shia Islamists, seeing opportunities for cooperation, saying "I would rather have Islamists from both Sunni and Shiite sects than liberal deputies who do not uphold Islamic values."

Government officials have sought to downplay concerns that the Islamist victory will have negative implications for personal freedoms in the Kingdom. Government spokeswoman, Ahdeya Ahmed, said that the several Islamists represented in the previous parliament had not managed to pass legislation to segregate Bahrain University or introduce "Vice and Virtue" police, and neither had Shia and Sunni Islamists working together on municipal councils sought to target people's rights.

Almost immediately after Ahmed made her comments, new Al Wefaq MP, Sayed Abdulla Al A'ali, announced that he wanted to see legislation introduced to restrict employment opportunities for women to prevent them entering "male orientated jobs". While the government has reacted to the sweeping Islamist victory by announcing a clamp on alcohol sales in residential areas.

== Results ==
Party	First round			Second round			Total seats
Party	Votes	%	Seats	Votes	%	Seats	Total seats
Al Wefaq			16			1	17
Al-Menber Islamic Society			4			3	7
Al Asalah			4			1	5
Independents			5			6	11
Total			29			11	40
Registered voters/turnout	295,686	72.0			73.6		
Source: IPU
