= Nationalist Democratic Assembly =

Ba'athist political party in Bahrain

Nationalist Democratic Assembly التجمع القومي الديمقراطي
- Leader: Hassan Ali
- Founded: 1991
- Headquarters: Zinj
- Ideology: Ba'athism; Saddamism
- International affiliation: Iraqi-led Ba'ath Party
- Colors: Black, Red, White and Green
- Council of Representatives: 0 / 40
- Consultative Council: 0 / 40

Party flag

Website
- al-qawmi.org

The Nationalist Democratic Assembly (Arabic: التجمع القومي الديمقراطي, Al-Tajamu'u Al-Qawmi Al-Dimuqratiyah) is a political party in Bahrain. It is the Bahraini regional branch of the Iraqi-led Ba'ath Party. The party is led by Secretary General Hassan Ali and Deputy Secretary General Mahmoud Kassab. It was established by Bahrainis who had studied in Ba'athist Iraq during the 1960s and 1970s. The party boycotted the 2002 parliamentary election but participated in the 2006 election. It also boycotted the 2011 parliamentary by-election, in solidarity with the Bahraini uprising. It is headquartered in Zinj.

The party opposes the government's naturalisation policies, and contends that it is unfair for ethnic Bahrainis to compete equally with foreign workers for jobs. It remains pro-Saddam Hussein and, according to its webpage, supports the Arab Spring. It opposed the 2003 invasion of Iraq, considering it an act of brutality against the Iraqi people. The party actively supports the overthrow of the existing monarchy, with a peaceful transition to democracy.

It is part of a four-party alliance opposing the government, which comprises two Shia Islamist parties (Al Wefaq and the Islamic Action Society) and the leftist National Democratic Action Society.

== See also ==
- List of political parties in Bahrain
