= National Justice Movement =

National Justice Movement حركة العدالة الوطنية
- Leader: Abdullah Hashem
- Founded: 5 March 2006
- Headquarters: Bahrain
- Ideology: Progressivism; Secularism; Arab nationalism
- Political position: Centre-left
- Council of Representatives: 0 / 40
- Shura Council: 0 / 40

The National Justice Movement (Arabic: حركة العدالة الوطنية), also known as the al-Adala Society, is a secular and Arab nationalist political party in Bahrain.

== History and profile ==
The National Justice Movement was founded on 5 March 2006 in Muharraq. It is led by former National Democratic Action lawyer, Abdullah Hashem, who is also the founder of the party. The intended constituency of the party is disaffected Leftists, liberals and some would say, Sunni voters, which the Movement seeks to attract away from the traditional parties through a mixture of progressive policy positions, anti-sectarianism and Arab nationalism. Abdullah Hashem has said that the party has not included the word 'Islam' in its name because it wants to attract people from every community.

Abdullah Hashem has said that the party specifically wants to counter the dominant influence of Al Wefaq National Islamic Society. His colleague Ahmad Zaman said that it wants to achieve a balance within the Bahraini society by "promoting awareness among the Sunnis and help them regain their rightful place. People should appreciate that the government and the Shiites are not the only players".

"We believe that Al Wefaq serves the interests of Bahrain's Shi'ite population while others like Al Asala Islamic Society serve the interests of Sunnis. Our movement will be working for the good of the country as a whole. It will not be a religious organisation and could include Muslims, both Sunni and Shi'ite, Christians, Jews and other people."

While having an avowedly anti-sectarian agenda, Arab nationalism has traditionally been popular among Sunni Muslims. The party's nationalist stance allows the party to attack the pan-Islamism of Sunni Islamist parties, Asalah and Al-Menbar Islamic Society, while giving it a strong position against Shia Islamists such as Al Wefaq. Mr Hashim has said: "National unity is our main goal and regardless of our beliefs, we can work together for the benefit of the country".

In what some regard as an unusual position for an Arab nationalist party, the Movement has not cited the United States as the main international enemy. At the party's launch, Britain and Iran were named the two countries with which it would not cooperate, publicly or secretly, because of their past and present attitudes towards Bahrain. "Britain had enslaved Bahrainis, undermined their rights and humiliated them during its occupation of Bahrain, whereas Iran has often laid claims to our country," said Ahmad Zaman, "...the United States, unlike Iran, does not have claims to Bahrain."

One of its candidates in the 2006 election was likely to be a twice-arrested terror suspect, Mohi Al Deen Mahmoud Khan. A former jihadi active in Afghanistan, Khan told reporters: "I do not rule out taking part in the legislative elections to serve the community, particularly after I joined the National Justice Movement". He praised the Movement, saying it would revive the rights of the Sunnis "who have lapsed into an uncomfortable silence that has made them appear as the unquestionably obedient supporters of the government while suffering from neglect in housing and other services provided by the state."

Khan was the leader of a six-member group arrested twice in 2004 on suspicion of planning to carry out "bombings on the government and businesses," according to Bahrain's Ministry of Interior and the National Security Agency. However, they were not charged. Khan's lawyer Fareed Gazi, an MP with the Economists Bloc said: "There is no concrete evidence against him. People should not be jailed for thoughts." After they were freed a second time, the six alleged a government harassment campaign against them, which included posting their photos on pornographic websites.

== See also ==
- List of political parties in Bahrain
