= List of political parties in Bahrain =

Political parties are illegal in Bahrain but operate as de facto political parties under the term political societies. Political societies in Bahrain range from the communist left to the Islamist right.

== Current ==
Pro-government parties
Party	Abbr.	Leader	Political positions & ideologies
Al-Asalah Islamic Society جمعية الأصالة الإسلامية	Asalah	Ghanim Al-Buaneen	Right-wing; Islamism; Salafism
Al-Menber Islamic Society جمعية المنبر الوطني الإسلامي	-	Ali Ahmed Abdulla	Islamism
National Justice Movement حركة العدالة الوطنية	-	Abdullah Hashem	Centre-left; Secularism; Arab nationalism
Al Meethaq جمعية ميثاق العمل الوطني	-	Ahmad Juma	Liberalism
Economists Bloc كتلة الاقتصاديون	-	Jassim Abdula'al	Liberalism

Opposition Parties
Party	Abbr.	Leader	Political positions & ideologies
Al Wefaq National Islamic Society جمعية الوفاق الوطني الإسلامية; Jam'iyat al-Wifaq al-Watani al-Islamiyah	Al-Wefaq	Shaikh Ali Salman	Islamism
February 14 Youth Coalition إئتلاف شباب ثورة 14 فبراير	The Coalition الإئتلاف	Anonymous activists	Liberal democracy; Social justice; Youth politics
Haq Movement حركة حق حركة الحريات والديمقراطية	HM	Hasan Mushaima	Constitutionalism
Al Wafa' Islamic Movement تيار االوفاء الإسلامي	Al-Wafa الوفاء	Abdulwahab Hussain	Islamism
National Democratic Action Society جمعية العمل الوطني الديمقراطي	NDLA; Wa'ad; وعد	Fouad Seyadi	Arab nationalism; Socialism
Islamic Action Society جمعية العمل الإسلامي; Jamʿiyah al-ʿAmal al-ʾIslami	Amal أمل	Muħammad Ali al-Mahfuodh	Islamism; Wilāyat al-Faqīh
Bahrain Freedom Movement حركة أحرار البحرين الإسلامية; Harakat Ahrar al-Bahrayn	BFM	Saeed al-Shehabi	Islamism; Constitutionalism
Nationalist Democratic Assembly التجمع القومي الديمقراطي; Al-Tajamu'u Al-Qawmi Al-Dimuqratiyah	NDA	Hassan Ali	Ba'athism
Progressive Democratic Tribune جمعية المنبر الديمقراطي التقدمي	PDT	Hassan Madan	Communism; Market socialism; Arab nationalism
Unitary National Democratic Assemblage جمعية التجمع الوطني الديمقراطي الوحدوي	Al Wahdawi الوحدوي	Hasan Al-Marzooq	-
Al Ekha National Society جمعية الإخاء الوطني	Al Ekha الإخاء	Musa Ghuloom Al-Ansari	-
Shabeeba Society of Bahrain جمعية الشبيبة البحرينية	-	-	Youth politics
National Liberation Front – Bahrain جبهة التحرير الوطني—البحرين	NLF	-	Communism; Marxism-Leninism; Republicanism
Al-Ashtar Brigades سرايا الأشتر	-	-	Pro-Iran
Al-Mukhtar Brigades سرايا المختار	-	-	Shia Islamism
Popular Front for the Liberation of Bahrain (until 2001) الجبهة الشعبية لتحرير البحرين	PFLB	Abdulrahman Al-Nuaimi	Arab nationalism; Marxism–Leninism
Islamic Dawa Party – Bahrain حزب الدعوة الاسلامية - البحرين	-	Solaiman Al-Madani	Islamism
Islamic Front for the Liberation of Bahrain (until 2002) الجبهة الإسلامية لتحرير البحرين	IFLB	-	Shia Islamism; Wilāyat al-Faqīh

=== Banned parties ===
registered opposition:

- Al Wefaq
- National Democratic Action Society
- Islamic Action Society

The unlicensed opposition:

- Bahrain Freedom Movement
- Haq Movement
- Al Wafa' Islamic Movement
- February 14 Youth Coalition
- Al-Ashtar Brigades
- Al-Mukhtar Brigades

== See also ==
- Politics of Bahrain
- Bahraini opposition
- List of ruling political parties by country
