= Sayed Falah Hashim =

Bahraini politician

- السيد فلاح هاشم
- Incumbent
- Assumed office 2018
- Monarch: Hamad bin Isa Al Khalifa
- Prime Minister: Khalifa bin Salman Al Khalifa, Salman, Crown Prince of Bahrain
- Parliamentary group: Progressive Democratic Tribune
- Constituency: Fifth District of the Northern Governorate

Personal details
- Occupation: politician

Sayed Falah Hashim Falah Abdullah (Arabic: السيد فلاح هاشم فلاح عبد الله) is a Bahraini politician and trade unionist. He was sworn into the Council of Representatives on December 12, 2018, representing the Fifth District of the Northern Governorate.

== Biography ==
He served as President of the Al Hidd Energy Syndicate for a time. He was promoted from Assistant Secretary-General for Social Protection to Deputy Secretary-General of the Progressive Democratic Tribune (Al-Minbar), a leading left-wing party in Bahraini politics.

== Council of Representatives ==
In the 2018 Bahraini general election, Hashim ran for office in the Fifth District of the Northern Governorate on behalf of Al-Minbar. He won 470 votes for 11.24% of the vote in the first round on November 24, leading to a runoff on December 2, in which he defeated his rival Ahmad Youssef by winning 1,417 votes for 51.79%.
