= February 14 Youth Coalition =

Organization

Coalition Youth of 14 Feb Revolution
- إئتلاف شباب ثورة 14 فبراير
- Founded: March 2011
- Founder: Anonymous activists
- Type: Pressure group Political group
- Purpose: Democracy; Social justice Free and fair elections
- Region served: Bahrain
- Official language: Arabic
- Website: Facebook page Twitter page

Coalition Youth of 14 Feb Revolution (Arabic: إئتلاف شباب ثورة 14 فبراير), sometimes called the Coalition (Arabic: الإئتلاف) is a Bahraini youth group, named after the date of the beginning of Bahrain's uprising, and led by anonymous individuals who organize protests chiefly via new-media sites. The Coalition first appeared on the popular pro-democracy forum Bahrain Online. Their Facebook page started in April 2011 where they have 65,282 likes (as of July 2014). It is the main Facebook page that calls for daily peaceful demonstrations and protests. One of the first sub-groups called February 14 Youth was behind the call for demonstrations on February 14, 2011, named "Day of Rage" and developed later into a nationwide uprising. In 2017, the group has been designated as a terrorist organization by Bahrain, Saudi Arabia, United Arab Emirates and Egypt.

== Components ==
Most of the youths in the Coalition are not members of any political society. They communicate via internet and social networks, especially Facebook. Many of them are high school or college students. They do not belong to a specific sect, its members include both Shia and Sunni. Inspired by March Intifada, an uprising that broke out in Bahrain in March 1965, there was an idea for electing a leadership for the Coalition with specified seats for Shias, Sunnis, men and women. However this idea was excluded due to fears of creating sectarian quotas like in Iraq and Lebanon, it was replaced by elections without specifying seats for sects. According to local sources, the Coalition has good communications with Youths behind Tunisian, Egyptian and Libyan revolutions.

Before the police raid on Pearl Roundabout on March 16 there were many groups which fused together after the attack to form The Coalition Youth of 14 Feb Revolution . They are:

- February 14 Youth.
- February 14 scholars.
- February 14 media center.
- February 14 liberals.
- February 14 martyrs.
- Youth of martyrs square.
- Others.

== Role during the uprising ==
=== Political demands ===
Before the uprising started, the Coalition called for political reform to establish a real Constitutional Monarchy which the National Action Charter stated. However, after police deadly pre-dawn raid on protesters in Pearl Roundabout on February 17 which resulted in four deaths and hundreds of injuries, the demand went to call for downfall of the regime.

One of the main demands for the Coalition is the right of Self-determination.

=== Calls for protests ===
Before the Coalition was formed, one of its components called February 14 Youth published weekly schedules for protests. The Coalition continued publishing weekly schedules for protests. Each day of the week has its own protesting schedule and usually each day is divided into 2 parts. Activities are not limited to protesting in streets, but are very varied. Usually at the end of every week there is a big protest held on Thursday, Friday or Saturday.

Starting from June 30, 2011, the Coalition has called for 10 gatherings for the right of Self-determination. However, none of the sit ins were able to happen due to authorities crackdown which results in clashes with protesters.

=== Relation with other youth movements ===
The Coalition keeps close relation with other youth movements such February 14 Youth Movement and usually they support each other's protest schedule. For example, when February 14 Youth Movement asked protesters to participate in Dignity collar, the Coalition supported it, calling for wide participation. 2 weeks later an understanding was established with February 14 Youth Movement to change the protest name to Manama Tsunami which was completely organized by the Coalition.

=== Opinion about "national dialogue" ===
On May 31, the king of Bahrain Hamad bin Isa Al Khalifa, called for a national dialogue to resolve ongoing tensions. However the seriousness and effectiveness of the dialogue has been disputed by many opposition figures – it has even been referred to disparagingly as a "chitchat room".

The Coalition said: "there is no way for us to accept a non-balanced dialogue that lacks all guarantees, we see this dialogue as a media tool which the regime aims to reduce the severity of popular and international pressures".

=== Opinion about 2011 by-elections ===
A parliamentary by-election was held in Bahrain on September 24, 2011, following the withdrawal of 18 members of the largest political party in parliament, al Wefaq, in protest at governmental actions during the Bahraini uprising (2011–present).

The Coalition welcomed Al Wefaq and other opposition societies decision to boycott the parliamentary by-election to fill their seats and called them to stick to the basics of the revolution.

== Aftermath of the Uprising ==
It was said that it became a paramilitary organization following the Uprising and Shia insurgency, morphing with the Popular Resistance Brigades.

== See also ==
- Al Wefaq National Islamic Society
- April 6 Youth Movement
- List of political parties in Bahrain
