= Bahrain national dialogue =

Bahraini parliamentary initiative following the 2011 Bahraini uprising

The Bahrain National Dialogue was an initiative instigated by King Hamad bin Isa Al Khalifa to promote reform and encourage discussion on the governance of Bahrain. The Dialogue began on 2 July 2011 and participants from over 300 organisations from across the Bahraini political spectrum were able to voice their concerns and thoughts freely and without being subject to conditions. The Dialogue was chaired by Parliament Speaker Khalifa bin Ahmed Al Dhahrani.

The National Dialogue was part of the King's response to the uprising that started in February 2011 and was running on parallel to the Bahrain Independent Commission of Inquiry, which was looking into the details of the events and the government response to them.

Out of 300 participants, Al Wefaq, Bahrain's main opposition party, had only 5 seats and pulled out from the dialogue 2 weeks after it started and about 1 week before it ended. In total the opposition parties had only 25 out of 300 seats, according to Bahraini human rights activist Maryam al-Khawaja. Khawaja also stated: "By joining the dialogue, Al Wefaq suffered a lot of heavy criticism, and lost a lot of supporters, especially from the youth who felt they were being betrayed."

== The Process ==
The process involved forwarding the outcomes of the sessions to HM the King, once they are agreed upon by all participating parties. HM the King then gives Royal orders to the executive and legislative authorities to take the necessary action with regard to the outcomes. The Dialogue's Chairman had no authority to eliminate any of the topics that have been agreed upon by majority during the sessions.

The topics of discussion for the dialogue were divided into four main areas that revolve around political, social, economic and human rights issues.

There was also a sub-theme covering issues related to expats living in Bahrain, by conducting a forum at the sidelines of the Dialogue.

== Participants ==
300 invitations for participation in the national dialogue had bent sent out, with 37% assigned for political societies, 36% for civil and non-governmental organisations, 21% for opinion leaders and prominent figures within the Kingdom of Bahrain and 6% for media representation.

The Civil and non-governmental organisations were covered with a representation of 12% for professional societies, 9% for social societies, 5% for women societies, 5% for youth societies, 3% for the various labour unions and 2% representation from the Bahrain Chamber of Commerce and Industry.

The invitees were requested to present their views and suggestions for topics to be discussed by June 26, 2011. Three opposition parties, who had won a combined 55% of the votes in the 2010 election, were given only five seats each out of 300 (a combined 5% of the seats).

== Opposition reaction ==
On July 1, in the speech preceding Friday Sermon, leading Shia cleric Isa Qassim welcomed the dialogue. "These are good steps in the right direction," he said. However, Qassim said jailed opposition leaders should be included in talks and that Shia should be given due weight. A number of opposition figures have doubted whether the dialogue proposal was a genuine government attempt to reform even being referred to as a "chitchat room" for that reason.

Nabeel Rajab, the head of Bahrain Centre for Human Rights welcomed the principle of dialogue as offering the only way out of the current political crisis, but criticized the current process. He considered it wrong to participate in a fake dialogue "that provokes sectarian tensions instead of resolving the current conflict". He rejected the government's attempt to frame the dialogue in terms of a discussion between Sunna and Shia because the problem and the political crisis were rooted in the relationship between the people of Bahrain and the ruling regime. February 14 Youth Coalition wasn't invited to the dialogue. Despite that, they called it a "fraud" and issued a statement saying: "there is no way for us to accept a non-balanced dialogue that lacks all guarantees, we see this dialogue as a media tool which the regime aims to reduce the severity of popular and international pressures".

== See also ==
- Khalifa Al Dhahrani
- Politics of Bahrain
