= Abdulrahman al-Nuaimi =

Abdulrahman al-Nuaimi (1943/1944 – September 1, 2011) was a Bahraini politician and opposition leader. Al-Nuaimi, who spent more than thirty years in self-imposed exile from Bahrain, founded some of the country's most important political opposition groups.

== Biography ==
He was born in 1944 on Muharraq Island to the Sunni Al Nuaim family that has close ties to the traditional ruling circles. In the 1960s, he became increasingly politically active and joined the Arab Nationalist Movement. In 1966, he graduated from the American University of Beirut with a degree in mechanical engineering.

After a crackdown on the workers' movements at the power station where he was working in 1968, he left Bahrain to live in exile, spending 33 years in Damascus. He founded the Popular Front for the Liberation of Bahrain (PFLB), a resistance group, during the 1970s. The group was inspired by the Arab Nationalist Movement which was sweeping through the Arab World at the time. In 2001, al-Nuaimi returned to Bahrain from exile and re-entered politics. He founded the National Democratic Action Society (NDA, also known as the Wa'ad party), Bahrain's largest leftist political party, with members of the former PFLB. Al-Nuaimi ran for a seat in the Council of Representatives of Bahrain during the 2006 parliamentary election, but lost to a pro-government candidate by a small margin.

Abdulrahman al-Nuaimi suffered from deteriorating health in the mid-2000s. He fell into a coma in April 2007. He was succeeded as head of the National Democratic Action Society by Ibrahim Sharif. Al-Nuaimi remained in a coma until his death on September 1, 2011, aged 67.
