= 1981 Bahraini coup attempt =

1981 coup attempt in Bahrain by Shi'a Islamists

The 1981 Bahraini coup d'état attempt was a failed coup d'état which was orchestrated by the Islamic Front for the Liberation of Bahrain which operated with alleged backing from Iran. The Bahraini Ministry of Interior arrested 73 individuals who were accused of attempting to overthrow the Bahraini monarchy and install an Islamic republic similar to that in Iran. The plot is viewed as the first overt attempt at undermining an Arab government in the Persian Gulf region with some measure of Iranian aid. The Iranian government denied involvement.

== Coup attempt ==
The coup was orchestrated by 73 individuals of various nationalities including 60 Bahrainis, 11 Saudis, a Kuwaiti, and an Omani. The Bahrainis had Shia-associated last names. The individuals had been trained in Iran, had automatic weapons, and some had Bahraini police uniforms, allegedly made in Iran. Iran denied all involvement. According to the government of Bahrain, an Iranian had brought two radios into Bahrain to be used by the plotters. The individuals planned to attack the Bahraini government offices, at a premises known as the Dar Al Hukuma, and take ministers as hostages while simultaneously taking over the national radio building and television stations on December 16; a date which marks Bahrain's national day. Three of the plotters were given life sentences, while the remaining 70 received lighter jail terms.

According to some analysts, the 1981 coup attempt in Bahrain was not only a localized effort but also part of a broader strategy by Iran to influence Shia-majority regions within the Persian Gulf region. The Islamic Front for the Liberation of Bahrain (IFLB), which orchestrated the coup, was heavily influenced by transnational Shia networks established by Iranian clerics such as Grand Ayatollah Mohammad Taqi al-Modarresi. These networks aimed to strengthen Shia political activism and challenge Sunni-dominated ruling families in the region. The coup attempt was a manifestation of Iran's longstanding claims over Bahrain and its efforts to export the revolutionary fervor following the 1979 Iranian Revolution. This event marked one of the earliest instances of Iran attempting to exert asymmetric influence in the Persian Gulf, setting a precedent for future geopolitical tensions between Bahrain and Iran.

== Reaction ==
The Bahraini government expelled a number of Iranian diplomats shortly after the arrests. The expulsions included Iranian diplomat Hassan Shushtari Zadeh, the top Iranian diplomat in Bahrain at that time.

== See also ==
- 1990s uprising in Bahrain
- 2011 Bahraini uprising
- Islamic Action Society
- Islamic Front for the Liberation of Bahrain
- Politics of Bahrain
- Bahrain–Iran relations
