= Islamic Front for the Liberation of Bahrain =

Islamic Front for the Liberation of Bahrain الجبهة الإسلامية لتحرير البحرين
- Founded: 1981
- Dissolved: 2002
- Ideology: Wilayat al Faqih; Shia Islamism
- Religion: Shia Islam

The Islamic Front for the Liberation of Bahrain (Arabic: الجبهة الإسلامية لتحرير البحرين) was a Shia Islamist militant group that advocated theocratic rule in Bahrain from 1981 to the 1990s. It was based in Iran and trained and financed by Iranian intelligence and Revolutionary Guards.

== Aims and activities ==
The professed aim of the Front was the 'uprising of all Muslims under Imam Khomeini'. It came to international prominence as the front organisation for the 1981 failed coup attempt in Bahrain, which attempted to install Iraqi Ayatollah Hadi al-Modarresi as the spiritual leader of a theocratic state. Al-Modarresi in addition to heading the IFLB served as Khomeini's “personal representative” in Bahrain.

According to Daniel Byman of Georgetown University, Iran's backing of the Front was part of a strategy to support radical Islamist groups throughout the region:

For Iran, supporting subversive movements became a way of weakening and destabilizing its neighbors as well as spreading its revolution and toppling what in the eyes of Tehran were illegitimate regimes. In 1981, shortly after the outbreak of the Iranian revolution, Tehran aided Shi’a radicals of the Islamic Front for the Liberation of Bahrain in an attempted coup against Bahrain's ruling Al Khalifa family.

The Front served as an Iranian proxy in the 1980s. It is also referred to as a 'virtual organization' of Iranian intelligence. In Low Intensity Conflict in the Third World by Stephen Blank et al., it is argued that the Front's attempted coup d’etat in 1981 cannot be understood without reference to Iran's geo-strategic objectives in its war with Saddam Hussein's Iraq:

A more persuasive view of the Bahrain incident [1981 coup] is the argument that the military conditions on the Iran-Iraq war front dictated a flanking movement that would isolate Iraq from its Arab support and secure for Iran a commanding position on the maritime oil route out of the Gulf. During the 14 months between the beginning of the war and the Bahrain coup, military activities had settled into a stalemate along a thousand kilometre front. The Iraqis had occupied the portion of Iranian Khuzistan that was ethnically Arab and were at the gates of Ahwaz and Dezful, the two principal oil producing towns of the province. But they were unable to exploit their advantage. The war had also degenerated into a contest of personalities between Khomeini and Saddam Hussein, each of who demanded the dismantlement of the other's government as a precondition of peace…By unleashing the forces of Islamic revolution in Bahrain, Khomeini was betting that he could physically outflank Iraq and capitalise politically on the Gulf Arabs' failure to support Iraq.

== 1990s bombings ==
The 1981 coup was not a success and following the failure to spur revolution, the Front became associated with bomb attacks, often against 'soft' civilian targets. On 1 November 1996, the Front claimed responsibility for the bombing of the Diplomat Hotel, with the group telling the Associated Press "We put a bomb in the Diplomat hotel 20 minutes ago...after the feast...tell the government that we will destroy everyplace." In the 1990s uprising in Bahrain the Front only played a marginal role, as its relationship with Iran, the perception that it represented the “Shirazi faction” (i.e. followers of Grand Ayatollah Mohammad Shirazi) despite the fact that Shirazi and Khomeini had a complicated relationship and its strategy of bombings all served to undermine its support among the wider community.

== Dissolution ==
The IFLB was disbanded in 2002 in response to King Hamad's reforms. Its members were amnestied from prison and exile and most returned to Bahrain to work within the political process in 2001, and were active in the Islamic Action Party and the Bahrain Centre for Human Rights (BCHR). The BCHR was banned in 2004, and the Islamic Action Party was banned in 2011, when it supported the 2011 Bahraini uprising.

== See also ==
- List of political parties in Bahrain
