= Lateefa Al Gaood =

Bahraini politician

Lateefa Al Gaood (Arabic: لطيفه القعود) is a Bahraini politician. She was the first woman in the Persian Gulf to win in a legislative general election, and also the first woman in the Council of Representatives of Bahrain.

== Early life and career ==
She graduated from the University of Nottingham in 1996. She also holds diplomas from Helwan University in Egypt as well as the Darden Graduate School of Business Administration in Virginia. She used to work for the Bahraini Ministry of Finance. She was first in the Ministry of Finance from 1978 to 1981 as a military retirement officer, then in General Accounts Control, before becoming Head of the Projects Payments department from 1985 to 1993. After serving as head of another department and as an expert, she became Director of Human Resources and Finance in 2003.

== Political career ==
She had previously run in the elections in 2002, the first election cycle where women were allowed to vote and run, but was unsuccessful in her bid. Due to her previous electoral failure she stood for a different constituency in 2006 to increase her chances of getting elected. In 2006, she became the first female candidate to be elected to the Council of Representatives of Bahrain. She won by default after the other two candidates in her constituency withdrew from the race in the middle of October before campaigning began. She was also the first woman in the Persian Gulf region to win in a legislative general election.

She retained her seat in 2010 while remaining the sole woman legislator for the sixth constituency of the Southern Governorate, until the 2014 elections when three women were elected to parliament which Gaood did not run in.

== See also ==
- Bahrain election 2006 women candidates
