= Sawsan Taqawi =

Bahraini politician

Sawsan Haji Taqawi (Arabic: سوسن تقوي, born 24 June 1972) is a Bahraini politician and president of the Bahrain Badminton and Squash Federation.

== Political career ==
In the 2011 Bahraini parliamentary by-elections held in the aftermath of the Bahraini uprising, she was elected unopposed as an independent candidate to Bahrain's lower house of parliament representing the Northern Governorate's second district. She became the country's first female Shia MP since Bahraini women were granted universal suffrage in 2002. As an MP, she has campaigned for increasing women's rights in the country, especially allowing the children of Bahraini women and foreign fathers the right to gain Bahraini citizenship.

She was appointed to the upper house of parliament in 2014 by the King of Bahrain, Hamad bin Isa Al Khalifa. While on the Shura Council, she was the chair of the foreign affairs, defence and national security committee. Under her chairpersonship, Bahrain recalled its ambassador to Iran over alleged Iranian interference in Bahraini domestic affairs. She served her term until 2018.
