= Ahdeya Ahmed =

Bahraini official

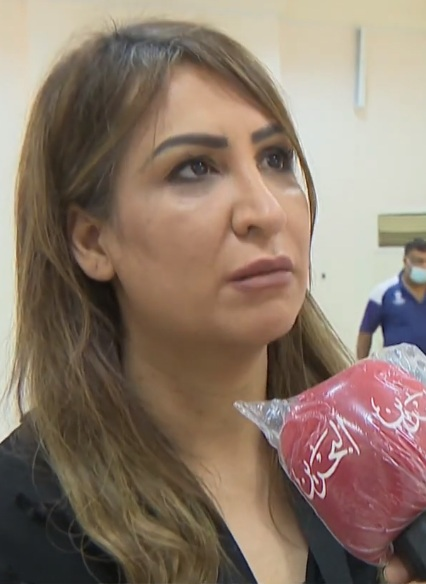
Ahdeya Ahmed, Bahrain TV - Jan 15, 2021

Ahdeya Ahmed Al-Sayed (Arabic: عهدية احمد السيد) is a Bahraini television personality, former government spokesperson and former spokesperson for the Bahrain Human Rights Watch. She began her career hosting a local talk show on Bahrain TV's Channel 2 (English) on which she interviewed local and regional personalities discussing current events and regional politics. She served as the Official Spokesperson for the Bahrain Parliamentary Election in 2006.

== Criticism ==
Her defense of the legitimacy of the electoral procedure in Bahrain and denial of the existence of Sectarianism in Bahrain came under criticism from famous Bahraini blogger Mahmood Al-Yousif, who titled his article about her statements "Blonde Moments in the Bahraini Elections."

- Mr. Al Yousif said of her:

"The pretty lady denies that we have any sectarianism in Bahrain at all and that the Bahraini citizen does not vote for a sect against another, and that the sectarian issue is not on the table at all and that we Bahraini citizens Sunna and Shi'a do not have a problem between us at all...Ms. Ahdeya Ahmed must hail from the outer reaches of Mars as I know that her little brain must have been indoctrinated...the translation of "official spokesperson" is no other than "mouth piece", but in your case, unfortunately, they forgot to specify the required brain power to control that orifice"

Her behavior and mannerisms were also criticized in Bahraini newspaper, Al-Wasat, by journalist Qassim Hussain. He called her knowledge of the Arabic language into question after she told reporters at a press conference to "Shut up" using the Arabic phrase "Usmutoo".

- He wrote the following with regard to Ahmed (translated from Arabic):

The provocative language itself lacked the tact required by the position, followed> Usmutoo <which topped the statement did not sit well at all, especially as it addresses the larger part of the political community, which reveal the forces of the people and civil society, and 90% of the candidates (independent or affiliated to various associations), except for those two foundations, supported by pro government. Word> Usmutoo <used for thirty years, to silence the voices of people and the suppression and prosecution of national figures, is far from the spirit of reform and political breakthrough.

== See also ==
- Bahraini parliamentary election, 2006
- Mahmood Al-Yousif
