= Mahmood Al-Yousif =

Bahraini blogger and political activist

Mahmood Al-Yousif (Arabic: محمود اليوسف) (born 1962) also known as The Blogfather, is a Bahraini blogger and political activist. Considered to be the "father of the Bahraini blogging community", Al-Yousif devotes his blog, titled "Mahmood's Den", to critiquing the Bahraini government, discussing local and world politics, sharing his views on current events, religion and society, as well as glimpses of his day-to-day life with his readers. He has been nominated for a Weblog Award.

== Activism ==
Mahmood Al-Yousif has adopted a series of socio-political causes including the "JUST BAHRAINI" campaign launched in 2006 which is aimed at desegregating the Sunni and Shiite population of Bahrain. Awareness of the cause is raised through the distribution of wristbands and badges with the campaign slogan "Not Shi'i, Not Sunni, JUST BAHRAINI". Amongst several other causes adopted by Al-Yousif is the promotion of freedom of speech in Bahrain and on the internet.

In an entry entitled "It's Over" posted on his blog on October 8, 2008, Al-Yousif explained that he had decided to stop blogging and "move on".

== Legal conflict ==
Due to the Bahraini government opposing some of his subject material, Mahmood Al-Yousif has found himself preparing for a legal battle after charges of libel were raised against him by the Bahraini Minister of Municipalities and Agriculture, Mansoor bin Rajab. In an article on his blog, Al-Yousif referred to the minister as "an insignificant member of the previous Shura Council" and criticized the way in which the minister and his ministry chose to deal with the flooding throughout the country brought about by heavy rains in December, 2006. Mahmood Al-Yousif was interrogated by the police for three hours in February and was released on bail. He was told that the Minister would drop the charge against him if his article was edited; however, after the changes were made to the article, Mr. Mansoor bin Rajab refused to drop the charge. Al Yousif will be tried under the Press and Publications Law or the Penal Code, thus, he faces a maximum penalty of two years in jail and/or a fine. He has been summoned to attend the hearing for the Libel charges brought against him on April 17, 2007. The legitimacy of the charges brought against Al-Yousif has been called into questions by several Human Rights organizations in Bahrain and abroad, local and international media sources and several notable figures in Bahraini society.

Bahraini police arrested Al-Yousif (along with others) after 3:00 am on March 30, 2011. The charges against him are unknown at this time.

== Criticism of government officials ==
Mahmood Al-Yousif has openly criticized several government employees in the past, most recently, Ahdeya Ahmed, the Government spokesperson for the Bahraini Parliamentary Elections in 2006.

== See also ==
- Bandargate scandal
- The Religious Policeman
- Ahdeya Ahmed
