= Supreme Council for Women =

Advisory body in Bahrain

The Supreme Council for Women (SCW) is Bahrain's advisory body to the government on women's issues. It is chaired by Sheikha Sabika bint Ibrahim Al Khalifa, the wife of Bahrain's King Hamad bin Isa Al Khalifa. The current Secretary General of SCW is Hala Al Ansari.

SCW was established to promote women's rights in the Kingdom and women's full participation in society, and has been at the forefront of the campaign for the introduction of a unified personal status law (see Women's rights in Bahrain). It has also published studies, worked to coordinate campaigns with other women's rights groups, and sought to promote female candidates for the 2006 municipal and general elections. Among the candidates contesting the 2006 poll, held on 26 November 2006, was the Council's Dr Munira Fakhro, who stood for the ex-Marxist Waad.

Former activist with SCW, Dr Nada Haffadh, was appointed Bahrain's first full female cabinet minister. She was Minister of Health from 2004 to 2007. Several other members are legislators in the upper chamber of parliament, the Consultative Council.

== Political opposition ==
According to Lulwa Al Awadhi the biggest obstacle to women's rights in Bahrain are clerics, who set political agendas for their followers and have remained steadfastly against a united family law in the kingdom. Ms Al-Awadhi said of particular concern is Shia clerics' objections to women taking part in municipal elections due to what she termed their 'strange' perception that female municipal councillors may be called late in the night to help with a municipal problem and thus be placed in a morally compromising situation.

== Criticism ==
Ghada Jamsheer, the most prominent women's rights activist in Bahrain, has accused the Supreme Council of hindering women's rights in Bahrain, calling it a "government cliché". In a statement in December 2006 she said:

The government is using the family law issue as a bargaining tool with opposition Islamic groups. This is evident through the fact that the authorities raise this issue when ever they want to distract attention from other controversial political issues. While no serious steps are taken to help approve this law, although the government and its puppet National Assembly had no trouble in the last four years when it came to approving restrictive laws related to basic freedoms. All of this is why no one in Bahrain believes in Government clichés and government institution like the Supreme Council for Women. The government used women’s rights as a decorative tool on the international level. While the Supreme Council for Women was used to hinder non-governmental women societies and to block the registration of the Women Union for many years. Even when the union was recently registered, it was restricted by the law on societies.

In a May 2007 statement, the Women's Petition Committee called for the dissolution of the Supreme Council for Women, citing its failure in "building and supporting Bahraini women". It further noted that "most women attained decision making positions on the basis of tribal or sectarian affiliation or personal allegiance to the Authorities and some members of the Royal court." The statement claimed that the SCW withheld support to prominent female activist Munira Fakhro in the 2006 elections, knowingly allowing Salah Ali of the Salafist Islamist Al Asalah party to win.

== See also ==
- Bahrain election 2006 women candidates
- Women's rights in Bahrain
