= Popular Front for the Liberation of Bahrain =

1974–2001 underground leftist political party in Bahrain

Popular Front for the Liberation of Bahrain الجبهة الشعبية لتحرير البحرين
- Leader: Abdulrahman al-Nuaimi
- Founded: 1974
- Dissolved: 2001
- Preceded by: Popular Front for the Liberation of the Occupied Arabian Gulf
- Succeeded by: National Democratic Action Society
- Ideology: Arab nationalism Marxism–Leninism

The Popular Front for the Liberation of Bahrain (Arabic: الجبهة الشعبية لتحرير البحرين, romanized: al-Jabha ash-Shaʿbiyya li-Taḥrīr al-Baḥrayn) was an underground political party in Bahrain with origins in the Arab Nationalist Movement. Its members were inclined towards the leftist Marxist trend within the Arab Nationalist Movement. It was created after the Popular Front for the Liberation of Oman and the Arabian Gulf was reconstituted into two separate organizations as the Popular Front for the Liberation of Oman and the Popular Front for the Liberation of Bahrain. Several PFLB members participated in the 1963 to 1976 Dhofar Rebellion in Oman.

In 2000, PFLB members established the National Democratic Action Society, the first officially licensed political organization in any of the Arab states of the Persian Gulf. The PFLB was replaced by the NDAS.

== See also ==
- Layla Fakhro
- March Intifada
- List of political parties in Bahrain
- National Union Committee
- Ibrahim Sharif
