= Arab Human Development Report =

The Arab Human Development Report (AHDR) (Arab: تقرير التنمية الإنسانية العربية) is an independent report sponsored by the United Nations Development Programme (UNDP), providing leading Arab scholars a platform through which to analyze the challenges and opportunities for human development in the Arab Region. UNDP's Arab Human Development Report Project maintains a website on which copies of the Reports are available for download in the Arabic, English and French languages.

== Contents ==
Building on the tradition of UNDP's global Human Development Reports, the Arab Human Development Report (AHDR) is a series of publications focused on challenges and opportunities for human development in the Arab region. The reports are carried out by an independent team of leading Arab scholars and researchers, and published by UNDP, which supports the project as part of its efforts to foster a healthy debate on development priorities within the region.

Work on the AHDR series was launched in 2000 as a way to respond to a sense of urgency among Arab thinkers as to the precipitous situation of Arab countries at the start of the new millennium. They identified an egregious economic decline in the region since the late 1970s. Such was the plummet in GDP that Spain's GDP was now greater than that of the entire Arab League combined.

The first AHDR (2002) provided a full spectrum diagnostic of factors accounting for shortfalls in the area of human development and summarized its findings by pointing to three major "development deficits" holding the region's progress back: (i) knowledge, (ii) women’s empowerment and (iii) freedom. These were the respective themes of the three follow-up reports published in 2003, 2004, and 2005, which completed the first series of the AHDR.

The first series of the AHDR made the vital contribution of injecting the Human Development concept into the Arab debate, as well as adding new rigor and frameworks to the consideration of specific development deficits. In their respective areas of focus, the Reports offered a wealth of far-reaching, relevant, and at-times-hard-hitting policy recommendations for governments, civil society and international partners. Not all messages were well received by all partners, but many of the messages enjoyed the endorsement of several governments in the region, and the Reports were discussed in hearings and meetings among Arab Foreign Ministers and the League of Arab States. At the same time, universities across the region and the world adopted the AHDR series into their curricula, and the Reports were energetically explored in various policy contexts by think-tanks, civil society groups and development institutions across the Arab region and beyond. Moreover, private foundations in the region absorbed and amplified the Reports’ messages. In short, a new set of ideas had been introduced into the regional debate, a contribution toward a reform agenda that has potential to stimulate productive discussion in order to put the pursuit of Arab human development on track.

=== Arab Human Development Report 2002: Creating Opportunities for Future Generations ===
The first AHDR aimed to take stock of development challenges and opportunities throughout the Arab States, driven by the belief that an accurate diagnosis of a problem is an important part of the solution. The report's independent team of researchers found that the Arab States had made substantial progress in human development over the preceding three decades. Nevertheless, the report argued that the predominant characteristic of the Arab reality of that time seems to be the existence of deeply rooted shortcomings in the Arab institutional structure. These shortcomings, the Report argued, are an obstacle to building human development. The report summarizes them as three deficits relating to freedom, empowerment of women, and knowledge. Specifically, the report concludes that Arab countries need to embark on rebuilding their societies on the basis of:

- Full respect for human rights and freedoms as the cornerstone of good governance
- The complete empowerment of Arab women, taking advantage of all opportunities to build their capabilities and to enable them to exercise those capabilities in full
- The consolidation of knowledge acquisition and its effective utilization. As a key driver of progress, knowledge must be brought to bear efficiently and productively in all aspects of society, with the goal of enhancing human well being across the region.

The Report was well received and vigorously debated within the Arab states and throughout the international media and policy community. Its frank and at time hard-hitting messages were not eagerly absorbed everywhere – in parts it looks through a critical lens and both Arab governments as well as international powers – but, all in all, the Report was broadly recognized as the best of its kind: An independent, Arab-owned research document showing to each and all the web of ambitions and frustrations that the Arab peoples encounter in their efforts to attain a higher level of human development.

As a wide-ranging diagnosis that was thoroughly debated in many corners, the first AHDR naturally gave rise to more questions than it could answer. Responding to demand for ongoing analysis, UNDP and partners in the region decided to sponsor three additional reports, each one exploring to greater depth, in turn, the three deficits identified by the first AHDR.

=== Arab Human Development Report 2003: Building a Knowledge Society ===
Following up on the first AHDR, this second in the series sought to deepen the analysis on the first of the three identified development deficits: knowledge. Despite the presence of significant human capital in the region, AHDR 2003 concluded that disabling constraints hamper the acquisition, diffusion and production of knowledge in Arab societies. This human capital, in a more promising framework, could offer a substantial base for an Arab knowledge renaissance.

Surveying the status of knowledge in the Arab region, the Report found that the quality of education has deteriorated severely, and there is a severe mismatch between the labour market and the education system. Adult illiteracy rates have declined but are still very high: 65 million adults are illiterate, almost two-thirds of them women. Some 10M children still have no schooling at all. One of the gravest results of their poor education is that the Arabs, who once led the world in science, are dropping ever further behind in scientific research and in information technology. Investment in research and development is less than one-seventh of the world average. Only 0.6% of the population uses the Internet, and 1.2% have personal computers.

The Report affirmed that knowledge can help the region to expand the scope of human freedoms, enhance the capacity to guarantee those freedoms through good governance, and achieve the higher human goals of justice and dignity. It also underlined the importance of knowledge to Arab countries as a powerful driver of economic growth through higher productivity.

Based on its analysis, the Report put forward a strategic vision for creating knowledge societies in the Arab world built on five pillars:

1. Guaranteeing the key freedoms of opinion, speech and assembly through good governance bound by the law;
2. Disseminating high quality education for all;
3. Embedding and ingraining science, and building and broadening the capacity for research and development across society;
4. Shifting rapidly towards knowledge-based production in Arab socioeconomic structures;
5. Developing an authentic, broadminded and enlightened Arab knowledge model.

AHDR 2003 makes it clear that, in the Arab civilization, the pursuit of knowledge is supported by religion, culture, history and the human will. Obstructions to this quest include the defective structures created by human beings – social, economic, and, above all, political. The Report argued that Arabs must remove or reform these structures in order to take the place they deserve in the rapidly growing world of knowledge.

=== Arab Human Development Report 2004: Towards Freedom in the Arab World ===
The starting point for the AHDR2004 was that "The Arab world finds itself at a historical crossroads. Caught between oppression at home and violation from abroad, Arabs are increasingly excluded from determining their own future."

From that basis, the report sought to analyze the status and prospects for freedom in the Arab countries. The Report presented freedom as incorporating not only civil and political freedoms, but also the liberation from all factors that are inconsistent with human dignity. To be sustained and guaranteed, freedom requires a system of good governance that rests upon effective popular representation and is accountable to the people, and that upholds the rule of law and ensures that an independent judiciary applies the law impartially.

The Report argued that those conditions are not present in the Arab countries. The enormous gap that separates today's reality and what many in the region hope for, the Report argued, is a source of widespread frustration and despair among Arabs about their countries' prospects for a peaceful transition to societies enjoying freedom and good governance.

Based on that analysis, the Report argued that the Arab region is at a decisive point that does not allow for compromise or complacency. If the Arab peoples are to have true societies of freedom and good governance, the report argued, they will need to be innovative. "Their challenge is to create a viable mode of transition from a situation where liberty is curtailed and oppression the rule, to one of freedom and good governance that minimizes social upheaval and human costs, to the fullest extent possible."

The Report's messages were discussed broadly throughout the region, and amplified by the news media. Aljazeera, for example, reviewed the Report as follows:

True democracy is absent and desperately needed. Most of the time human rights are no more than a poster hung in sham councils and organisations. The educational system is severely retarded; schools produce ignorant young men and women who excel in rote memorisation more than educated innovators. Most intellectuals, even if they deny it, realise that most of what was said in the most recent Arab Human Development Report is true.

=== Arab Human Development Report 2005: Towards the Rise of Women in the Arab World ===
The starting point for this Report was the observation that Arab countries have undoubtedly attained significant achievements in the advancement of women, and Arab women have made outstanding achievements in diverse fields of human activity, but much more remains to be accomplished in enabling the equitable acquisition and utilization of human capabilities and human rights by women. The Report argued for the full ratification and implementation of all the provisions of the United Nations Convention on the Elimination of All Forms of Discrimination Against Women (CEDAW), as well as a wide-ranging movement in Arab civil society that engages both women and men in the struggle to steadily expand the frontier of women's opportunities – for the benefit not only of women but for Arab society as a whole.

In particular, the Report calls for the adoption of time-bound affirmative action, tailored to the specificities of each Arab society, in order to expand the participation of women in all fields of human activity. The Report argued that such measures were imperative to dismantle the structures of centuries of discrimination.

== Critical reception ==
The contents of these reports have not been solely received uncritically. For example, in a response to the first report (2002) published via the Middle East Information and Research Project, Middle East historian Mark Levine welcomed AHDR data as "sorely needed" while also criticizing the overall framework of the study as affirming "bias against Islam and Arab cultural production and political resistance."

== See also ==
- Munira Fakhro, Bahraini advisor to 2004 AHDR
- Rima Khalaf Hunaidi
- Clovis Maksoud
