= 2002 Bahraini general election =

General elections were held in Bahrain on 24 October 2002 to elect the forty members of the Council of Representatives, with a second round on 31 October 2002. They were the second general elections in the country's history, and the first since the dissolution of the 1973 National Assembly.

The elections were the first to be held under the 2002 constitution, with voter turnout reported to be 53.2%. For the first time, women had the right to vote and the right to stand in national elections.

== Campaign ==
The elections were boycotted by Al Wefaq, the country's largest political party, as well as the National Democratic Action Society, the Nationalist Democratic Rally Society, and Islamic Action Society. They claimed that the 2002 constitution gave too much power to the unelected Consultative Council, the upper house of the legislative body, and demanded a reform of the constitution.

== Results ==
Party	Votes	%	Seats
Independents			40
Total			40
Registered voters/turnout	243,449	53.48	
Source: NDI

Although all candidates ran as independents due to the ban on political parties, six political societies gained representation in the Council of Representatives. The Islamic Forum and al Asalah both won six seats, Rabita al-Islami won three seats, the Shura Society and the National Democratic Assembly both won two seats, whilst al Meethaq won one.
