= Ibrahim Sharif =

Bahraini dissident

- ابراهيم شريف
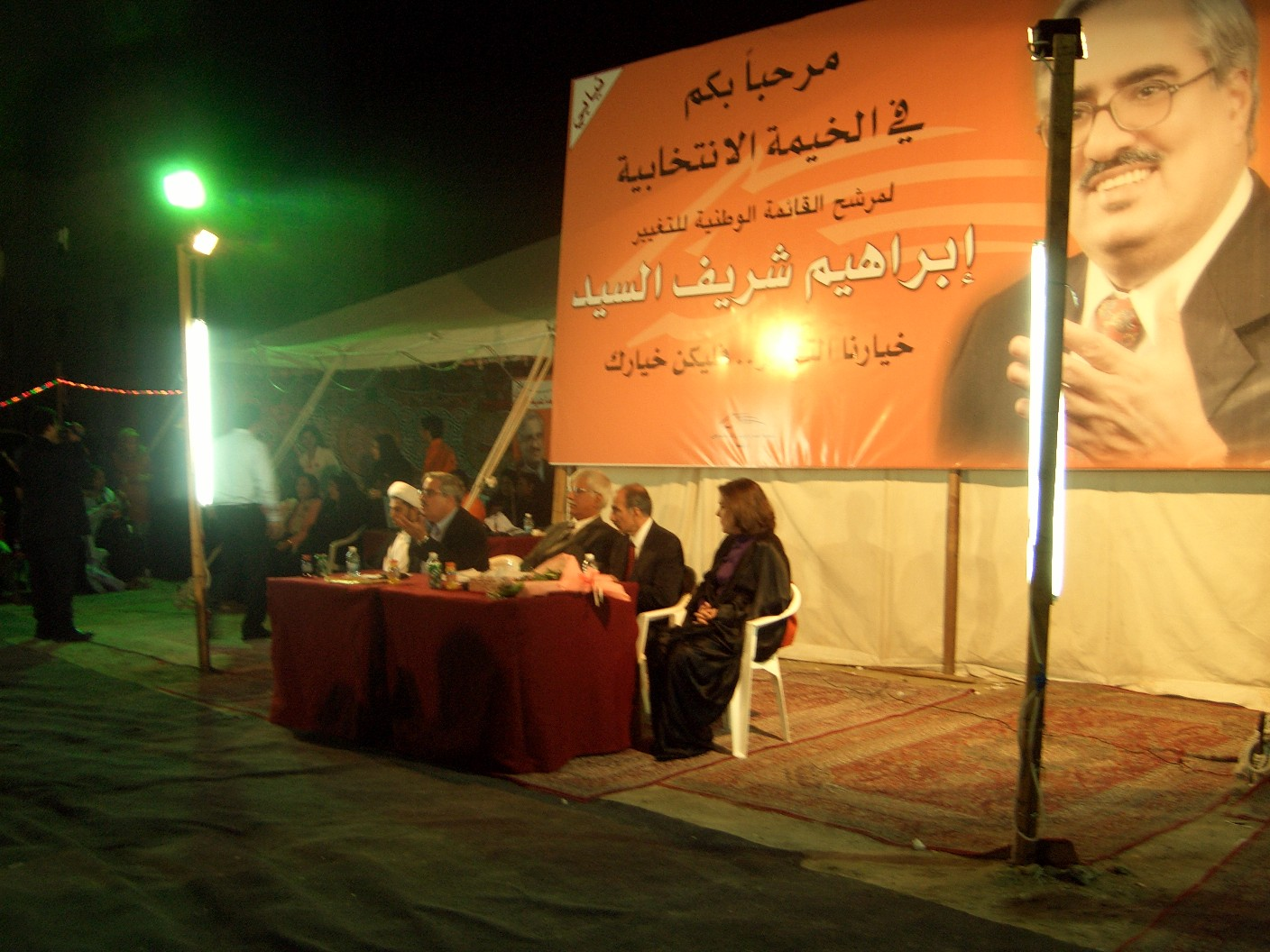
- Ibrahim Sharif campaign meeting ahead of the 2006 parliamentary election. Sharif second to the left, Munira Fakhro on the right side of the table.

General Secretary of National Democratic Action Society (Wa'ad)
- In office 2005–Present

Personal details
- Born: May 15, 1957 (age 69) Bahrain
- Party: Wa'ad
- Other political affiliations: Popular Front for the Liberation of Bahrain (former)
- Profession: Politician, Activist

Ibrahim Sharif al-Sayed (Arabic: ابراهيم شريف السيد, romanized: Ibrāhīm Sharīf al-Sayyid) is an opposition political activist in Bahrain, currently serving as the General Secretary of the secular socialist National Democratic Action Society (Wa'ad). He succeeded former General Secretary Abdulrahman al-Nuaimi, who fell into a coma in April 2007 and died in 2011. Sharif was formerly associated with the underground Arab nationalist and Marxist Popular Front for the Liberation of Bahrain. Sharif is a Sunni Muslim.

On 17 March 2011, Sharif was arrested from his home in Manama for his role in the Bahraini uprising, which called for greater political freedom and for the rights of the Shia majority in the country. Shortly after, Amnesty International reported allegations that he was being tortured by state security forces while in detention. The organization named him a prisoner of conscience, and called for his immediate release.

On 22 March 2011, the Telecommunications Regulatory Authority of Bahrain announced a decision to revoke all licenses from Bahraini telecom firm 2Connect, of which Sharif owned more than 10 percent at the time. According to the Gulf Daily News, rumors of the suspension had been circulating since 14 March 2011, although the Telecommunications Regulatory Authority had initially denied these rumors. In a statement to the Gulf Daily News on 23 March 2011, founder and managing director Fahad Shirawi revealed that the company had initiated a process to ensure that the company was 100% owned by himself, a group of Saudi investors, and the employees. The decision to revoke 2Connect's licenses was reversed on 13 April 2011. Also on 13 April 2011, 2Connect released a statement saying that Shirawi was stepping down from his position as managing director and leaving 2Connect after seven years of service, for personal reasons.

Sharif was sentenced to five years in prison on 22 June 2011. In September 2012, an appeal court upheld his sentence, despite determining that the evidence against him had been obtained by means of torture.

Sharif was released from imprisonment on 20 June 2015.

On 8 January 2026, Sharif was sentenced to six months' imprisonment for criticizing Arab states and calling for more support for Palestine in an interview.

== See also ==
- Munira Fakhro
- Bahrain Thirteen
