= Shabeeba Society of Bahrain =

Shabeeba Society of Bahrain (Arabic: جمعية الشبيبة البحرينية, romanized: Jimayah Alshibayabah Albajrinih); Youth Society of Bahrain) is a democratic youth organization in the Kingdom of Bahrain struggling for the rights of the young Bahrainis in education, healthcare, democracy, freedom and involvement in political life.

Shabeeba also focuses on its international action as a member of the World Federation of Democratic Youth.

The work of Shabeeba is significant, being the only leftist youth organization in the Persian Gulf region, which suffers authoritarian and social oppression, and where there is no real democratic experience.

Shabeeba organized an international conference called "Gulf Youth and Path to Democracy" on October 31 and November 1, 2008, with broad international and local participation, and set some recommendations for the struggle for future reform in the region. Among the participants were youth and activists from Jordan, Kuwait, Saudi Arabia, Lebanon, Bahrain, Sweden, Portugal, Greece, India, Mauritius and Cyprus.

== See also ==
- List of political parties in Bahrain
