= Layla Fakhro =

Bahraini educator and revolutionary (1945–2006)

- ليلى فخرو
- Fakhro in an interview with the BBC during the rebellion, c. 1967–68
- Born: Layla Abdulla Yousif Fakhro; 1945; Muharraq Island, Bahrain
- Died: 21 September 2006 (aged 60–61); London, England
- Other names: Huda Salem; Mama Huda
- Education: American University of Beirut; Al-Mustansiriya University
- Occupations: Educator; businesswoman; politician
- Known for: Taking part in the Dhofar rebellion
- Spouse: Ubaiydli Al-Ubaiydli
- Children: 2

Layla Abdulla Yousif Fakhro (Arabic: ليلى عبد الله يوسف فخرو; 1945 – 21 September 2006) was a Bahraini educator and revolutionary, best known for taking part in the Dhofar rebellion in Oman in the 1960s. She was also one of the first women to run in Bahraini parliamentary elections.

== Biography ==
Layla Fakhro was born in 1945 on Muharraq Island in Bahrain. She obtained a master's degree in statistics from the American University of Beirut, Lebanon and a license in statistics from Al-Mustansiriya University in Baghdad, Iraq. She became involved in political activities in Bahrain in 1964, and was a student leader and activist while studying in Beirut in the 1960s. She was the head of the cultural committee from 1967–1968 while at the University in Beirut.

In the 1960s, Fakhro joined the armed struggle against the British in Dhofar, Oman, under the assumed name "Huda Salem" (هدى سالم). Fakhro established the first school of the revolution, through which much of the top echelon of Omani government and enterprise passed, providing the basis for the modern educational system in Oman. These enterprises made Fakhro a legend throughout the Arab world in general, and the Gulf in particular. In 1983, she moved with her twin daughters Munira and Aisha to Nicosia, the capital of Cyprus, to spend more than ten years, establishing the Delmon Publishing House while in exile. Among Fakhro's achievements:

- established the Awal Women's Society in Bahrain in 1968;
- established the Revolutionary Schools in the Sultanate of Oman;
- established the modern educational system in the Sultanate of Oman.

After being exiled from Bahrain for more than 25 years due to her political activities, upon her return in 1995 she established the Alnadeem Information Technology company with her husband and other partners.

Fakhro died in London on 21 September 2006, after a long illness. She was survived by her two daughters, Munira and Aysha, and husband Ubaiydli Al-Ubaiydli.
