= 2011 Bahraini parliamentary by-elections =

- 24 September 2011

18 lower house seats vacated during the Bahraini uprising
- Turnout: 17.4%
Prime Minister before election
Khalifa Bin Salman Al Khalifa
Elected Prime Minister
Khalifa Bin Salman Al Khalifa

Parliamentary by-elections on 18 seats were held in Bahrain in 2011 following the resignation of 18 MPs from the largest political party in parliament, Al Wefaq, in protest against the government's actions during the Bahraini uprising. Security forces closed Pearl Roundabout and attacked protestors in the village of Sanabis. The elections were held using a two-round system, with the first round on 24 September and the second on 1 October 2011 in the constituencies where no candidate had received a majority of the vote in the first round.

== Background ==
The lower house of parliament has the authority to pass legislation proposed by the sovereign or the governing cabinet, as well as monitoring authority. The upper, unelected Consultative Council has the power to block legislation from the lower house. The minority Sunni Al-Khalifa dynasty has ruled the majority Shia country since 1783. The Bahraini uprising started in early 2011, with massive protests, occupation of the Pearl Roundabout, arrests and other responses by police, destruction of the Pearl Roundabout, and entry of the Peninsula Shield Force to Bahrain. MPs from Al Wefaq, the largest party in parliament, resigned their seats in protest against the government's responses.

== Conduct ==
Women confront riot police beating man in Sanabis on 23 September. Demonstrators from Sanabis attempted to return to the Pearl Roundabout, in a protest timed to coincide with the boycott of the elections.

On Friday 23 September, dozens of people were arrested and some were badly beaten. Nabeel Rajab of the Bahrain Centre for Human Rights reported that 38 women were detained for a 45-day period.

On election day, 24 September, hundreds to thousands of protestors gathered in the village of Sanabis with the intention of marching to the Pearl Roundabout, which had been physically occupied by protestors during the Bahraini uprising and whose monument had been destroyed by the authorities in response. Security forces used tear gas, stun grenades and rubber bullets against the protestors.

Graffiti near a voting station stated "Down with Hamad" and "The people want to bring down the regime".

== Results ==
All of the new winners were independent candidates, unofficially regarded as being pro-Al Khalifa, as they ignored the opposition boycott. Three women were among the new winners. Four seats were won uncontested, five seats were won after voting in the first round of the elections, while the remaining nine were decided by a second round of voting.

Voter turnout was 17.4% for the 14 contested districts due to a boycott by Al Wefaq and the rest of the opposition. The government however claimed a turnout of 51%, which was calculated over all 40 electoral districts, including districts where there was no contest in 2011. For the 22 uncontested districts whose MP did not withdraw from parliament, the government used turnout figures from the 2010 election. For districts among these 22 that were uncontested in 2010, the government assumed 100% turnout. For the four uncontested districts whose MP withdrew from parliament, the government also assumed 100% turnout.

Winners of 2011 Bahraini parliamentary by-elections
Governorate	District	Candidate	Party	First round		Second round	
Governorate	District	Candidate	Party	Votes	%	Votes	%
Capital	2	Ahmed Qarata	Independent	793	53.3		
Capital	3	Ibtisam Abdulrahman Ahmed	Independent	259	39.3	366	54.0
Capital	4	Ali Shamtoot	Independent	105	36.3	148	56.5
Capital	5	Hassan Bukhammas	Independent	499	71.8		
Capital	7	Abdulhakeem Al Shemri	Independent	1,121	60.4		
Capital	8	Jamal Abdullah	Independent	390	49.1	430	69.4
Muharraq	6	Abbas Ali Maadhi	Independent	Elected unopposed			
Northern	1	Ali Hassan Ali	Independent	538	42.7	831	65.3
Northern	2	Sawsan Taqawi	Independent	Elected unopposed			
Northern	3	Ali Al Dirazi	Independent	Elected unopposed			
Northern	5	Salman Hamad Al Shaikh	Independent	460	53.4		
Northern	7	Khalid Al Malood	Independent	1,785	45.2	2,018	57.1
Northern	8	Mohammed Bu Qais	Independent	2,340	41.6	2,999	55.3
Northern	9	Khalid Abdulaal	Independent	335	51.2		
Central	1	Samia Al Jowder	Independent	1,125	26.4	1,725	51.0
Central	2	Ahmed Al Saati	Independent	599	41.6	595	57.4
Central	5	Osama Mihna	Independent	481	46.6	443	51.5
Central	6	Jawad Hassan	Independent	Elected unopposed			
Source: Alwasat Newspaper & Gulf Daily News
