= Ali Salman =

Bahraini Shia cleric

Ali Salman علي سلمان
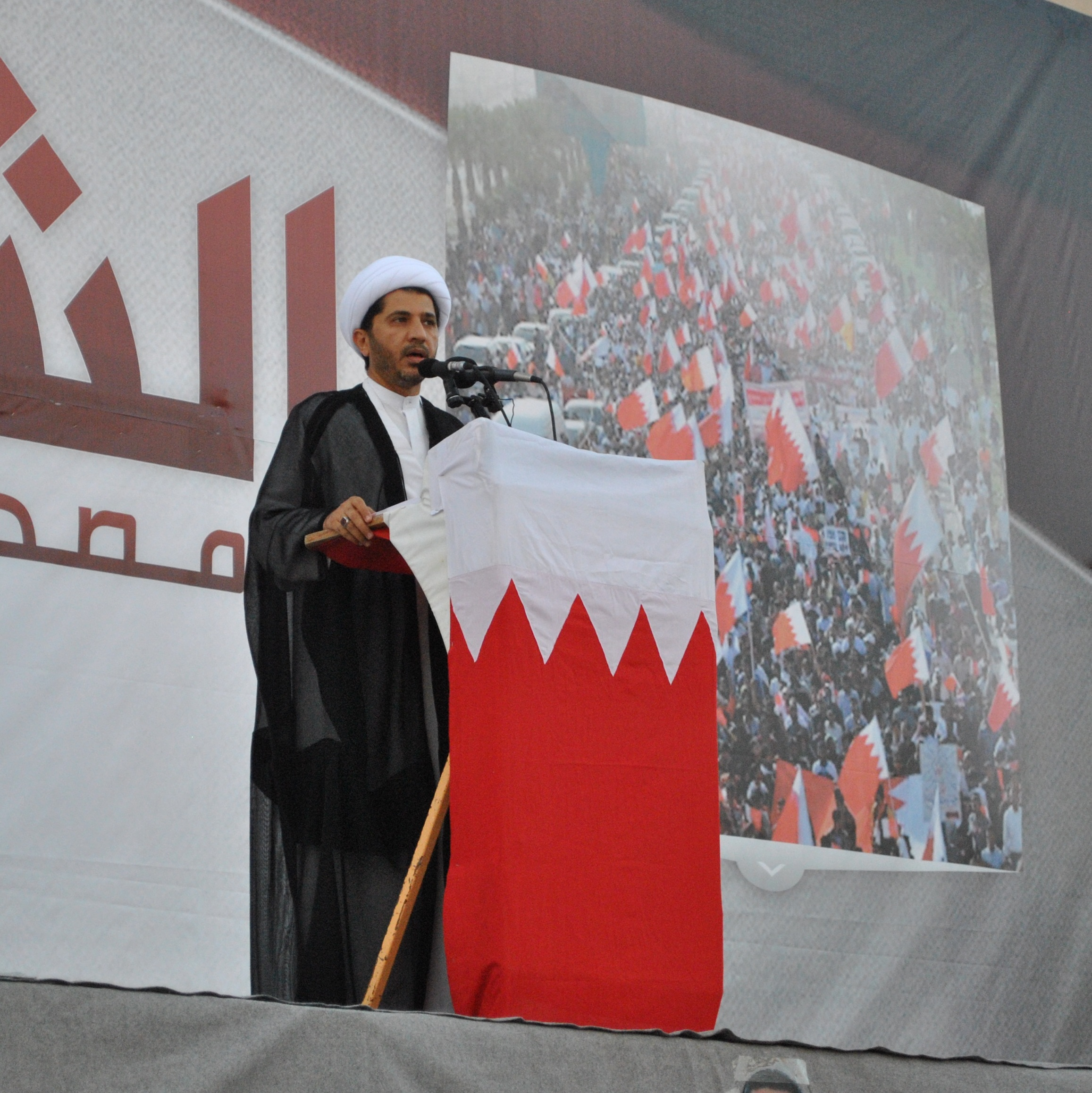
- Salman giving a speech in 2012

National Assembly

Member of Parliament for 1st constituency in the Northern Governorate
- In office 2006–2010
- Preceded by: Mohd Husain Ahmed AlKhayyat
- Succeeded by: Matar Matar

Secretary General for Al Wefaq National Islamic Society
- In office 2006–Present

Chairman of Board for Al Wefaq National Islamic Society
- In office 2001–2005

Personal details
- Born: 30 October 1965 (age 61) Bilad Al Qadeem, Bahrain
- Party: Al Wefaq National Islamic Society
- Children: 3
- Education: BSc, Mathematics (KSA) & Islamic Studies, Qom (Iran)
- Website: www.toqa.net

Ali Salman Ahmed Salman (Arabic: علي سلمان أحمد سلمان) is a Bahraini Twelver Shi'a cleric and the Secretary-General of the Al-Wefaq political society. In January 1995, the Bahraini government forcibly exiled him to Dubai for leading a popular campaign demanding the reinstatement of the constitution and the restoration of parliament during the 1990s Uprising. From there, he made his way to London and sought asylum. He continued opposition activities from London, where he was associated with the Bahrain Freedom Movement. Salman returned to Bahrain in March 2001 in a general amnesty as part of a set of political reforms announced by King Hamad.

According to an unknown source close to his family, Ali Salman was severely tortured by the Al Khalifa regime in prisons. Numerous protests were held against the detention of Ali Salman and several people were injured after the Al Khalifa forces fired tear gas and birdshots to disperse the protesters. Within Al Wefaq he is considered a 'moderate' public face of the organization and has opposed the more confrontational approach with the authorities typical of the other leaders.

== Religious Beliefs ==
Ali Salman originally studied in Qom, a major centre of Twelver Shi'a theological thinking in Iran. He is a Twelver Shiite who originally followed the quietist teachings of Grand Ayatollah Sayyid Abu al-Qasim al-Khoei, the spiritual leader of much of the Shia world until his death in 1992. Following the death of his original Marja’, Salman has not felt compelled to speak publicly about his new Marja’. However, in a private interview, he claimed that he now tended to rely on the rulings of Grand Ayatollah Sayyid Ali al-Husayni al-Sistani.

This choice is significant, as Salman does not rely on an external source of authority to justify his political positioning. This following of Sistani is on a purely individual basis that does not spill over into the public sphere; Sistani is a Marja’ known for avoiding interference in the political choices of his followers.

== Role in the 1990s Uprising in Bahrain ==
Ali Salman is widely perceived to have been one of the leaders of the 1990s uprising in Bahrain. The starting point of the uprising is described as having been a charity marathon organised in November 1994 by several foreign companies. As the marathon runners, both men and women dressed in shorts and T-shirts, entered some Shia villages, groups of villagers headed by activist clerics tried to stop them, considering that running among them in such light clothing was a direct insult to their religious and moral values. Events disintegrated into fist-fighting and stone throwing. The same night, security forces arrested several of the protesters, including Ali Salman. His arrest sparked a cycle of mass-demonstrations that led to the death of a dozen demonstrators and the incarceration of hundreds of others. Salman was the leader of several of these demonstrations.

Following his arrest in 1994, Salman was exiled and made his way to London, where he associated with the Bahrain Freedom Movement, an opposition group led by Saeed al-Shehabi. Salman worked independently from the group but was in cooperation with them in order to achieve the political demands of the Bahrain uprising, mainly by releasing regular communiqués distributed in Bahrain in which they demanded the reinstatement of the Parliament.

== Position in Al Wefaq ==
Salman is the current official leader of Al Wefaq. His legitimacy as leader is derived from elections that are held every four years in Al Wefaq's General Conference where at least 50%+1 of all members in Al Wefaq elect the Secretary-General, his deputy, the members of both Al Wefaq's Shura Council and Arbitration Board. Salman faces little competition as leader of the movement and is regarded as an inspirational figure. However, the General Conference is the supreme authority in Al Wefaq and is authorized to dismiss the Secretary-General and his deputy.

Al Wefaq's organisational structure includes a Shura Council. To ensure continuity, council members serve staggered four-year terms, with half of the seats up for election every two years. The Shura Council is an advisory and monitoring board to the General-Secretariat which is formed by the Secretary-General.

The spiritual Godfather for the Wefaqi party is Sheikh Isa Qassim, a senior Bahraini cleric. Sheikh Isa Qassim is the most prominent cleric in Bahrain with the biggest number of followers. This can be clearly seen by comparing the number of people who pray behind him with those who pray behind other clerics. He has proved his ability to contain the anger of the masses that pray behind him and listen to his sermon every Friday. He has been able to spread self-restraint among his followers even in the peak of regime-terror and brutality during the state of emergency in 2011 following the wide Arab-Spring-inspired pro-democracy protests. However, small groups of youth do clash with the police.

Pro-regime groups believe that Ali Salman, the formal head of al-Wefaq and also a cleric, is “obeying the orders of Isa Qassim, his former teacher and superior in the clerical hierarchy”. The independence of ‘Ali Salman as the formally elected leader of al-Wefaq is believed to be limited by his obligation, as a cleric who has not yet reached the level of independent reasoning (ijtihad), to submit his decisions to the sanction of a higher-ranking scholar. Because its leadership is considered subservient to an external religious authority, and therefore, they argue al-Wefaq is considered as lacking the transparency for the normal exercise of internal democracy. However, this claim fails to stand accurate in face of Al Wefaq's public and open strategy. For instance, in 2002, when the parliament was restored after about 30 years of suspension, Sheikh Issa Qassim's publicly declared advise to Al Wefaq was to participate in the elections, but Al Wefaq took a joint-decision with other opposition groups to boycott the 2002 elections in protest of the King's unkept promise to separate the three powers and transit from an absolute monarchy to a constitutional monarchy.

== Arrest and life imprisonment ==
Salman was arrested on 28 December 2014 on charges for spying and colluding with Qatar to overthrow the government of Bahrain. On 4 November 2018, he was sentenced to life in prison for treason.

== See also ==
- Shia Crescent
