= Jassim Al Saeedi =

Bahraini politician

Jassim Al Saeedi is a Bahraini salafist MP, member of parliament representing a constituency in Riffa, Bahrain.

After he was banned from standing in 2002's general election for the main Salafist party, Asalah, for being "too extreme", Al Saeedi stood and won the election as an independent. He is often referred to as Bahrain's "most extreme extremist" due to his making statements such as, "O Allah curse the Jews, Christians and the Shi'a and show me in them a black day."

Other campaigns of his include proposals to gender-segregate every aspect of Bahraini society, introduce Sharia Law, and replace on the grounds that it is "unIslamic" the ancient Dilmun Burial Mounds with luxury villas. In 2003 he was forced to apologise to parliament after he tried to ban Shia Bahrainis from holding Husseini commemorations, which traditionally take place in the streets.

In February 2006, Al Saeedi called for the removal of banners placed around Bahrain by the Shia Islamic Enlightenment Society, which he claimed were inciting sectarianism. The banners, allegedly quoting leading Shia cleric, Isa Qassim, read, "The battle of Karbala is still going on between the two sides in the present and in the future. It is being held within the soul, at home and in all areas of life and society. People will remain divided and they are either in the Hussain camp or in the Yazid camp. So choose your camp."
