= Progressive Democratic Tribune =

Bahraini political organisation

Progressive Democratic Tribune جمعية المنبر الديمقراطي التقدمي
- Secretary-General: Abdul Nabi Salman
- Founder: Ahmad Al-Thawadi
- Founded: 14 September 2001
- Preceded by: NLF – B
- Headquarters: Manama
- Student wing: Student Union Bloc
- Youth wing: Shabeeba Society of Bahrain
- Ideology: Communism
- Political position: Left-wing to far left
- International affiliation: IMCWP
- Council of Representatives: 0 / 40
- Shura Council: 0 / 40

Website
- www.altaqadomi.org

Progressive Democratic Tribune (Arabic: جمعية المنبر الديمقراطي التقدمي), often referred to as al-Minbar, is a political organization launched by returning exiles from the underground communist National Liberation Front – Bahrain in 2001. Ahmad Al-Thawadi was its founding chairman. Effectively al-Minbar came to act as a successor to the NLF.

The party has been opposed to sectarian politics and sought to represent constituents regardless of their creed. It has been a consistent champion of women's rights and freedom of speech, consequently its MPs often found themselves allied with liberals. One of its three MPs, Abdulhadi Marhoon, served as the Deputy Speaker from 2002 to 2006.

Al-Minbar also has a youth organization, Shabeeba Society of Bahrain, that is active among the students and young workers with a network of regional and international connections with other left-wing democratic youth organizations.

Ahead of the 2006 election, al-Minbar launched the electoral bloc 'National Unity', which had 9 candidates for the Council of Representatives, 5 of whom were members of al-Minbar. None of its candidates were elected. At the 2018 election, al-Minbar won two seats for the Council of Representatives.

== See also ==
- List of political parties in Bahrain
