= Islamic Action Society =

Islamist political party in Bahrain

Islamic Action Society جمعية العمل الإسلامي
- Leader: Shaykh Muħammad ʻAlī al-Mahfūð
- Spiritual leader: Hadi al-Modarresi
- Founded: 2001
- Dissolved: 2011
- Preceded by: Islamic Front for the Liberation of Bahrain
- Ideology: Islamism; Wilāyat al-Faqīh
- Religion: Shi'a Islam (Shirāzī)
- Council of Representatives: 0 / 40
- Shura Council: 0 / 40

The Islamic Action Society (Arabic: جمعية العمل الإسلامي Jamʿīyah al-ʿAmal al-ʾIslāmī), sometimes shortened to ʿAmal (Arabic: أمل) was one of the main Islamist political parties in Bahrain, and mainly appealed to Shīʻa followers of the Islamic philosopher Mohammad Hussaini Shirazi, who are known as "the Shirāzī faction".

The party boycotted the 2002 general election along with several other opposition groups, but did take part in the 2006 parliamentary election, in which it won no seats.

The party is the direct descendant of the militant organisation, the Islamic Front for the Liberation of Bahrain, whose members were pardoned after wide ranging political reforms instigated by Bahrain's ruler Hamad bin Isa Al Khalifa in 2001. With the reforms, they returned from exile or were released from prison and formed the Islamic Action Society.

As with the Islamic Front for the Liberation of Bahrain, the party's spiritual leader was Iraqi cleric Hādī al-Mudarrisī, who was given asylum in Bahrain in the 1970s and acquired Bahraini citizenship while preaching religious awareness. He was expelled to Iran after he set up the Front, and attempted to return to Bahrain in 1981 as the head of a theocratic government in a failed coup d'état.

The Front was accused by the government for a series of terror attacks on civilian targets in the 1990s including a bomb attack on the Diplomat Hotel in Manama in 1996, injuring four people. A spokesman claiming responsibility for the bombings told the Associated Press "We put a bomb in the Diplomat hotel 20 minutes ago ... after the feast ... tell the government that we will destroy everyplace."

The party often called for public demonstrations and political seminars focusing on the issues affecting the majority Shīʻa, who have been ruled by the minority Sunnis for many decades. In September 2005, its license was temporarily suspended after a crowded festival was held honouring those imprisoned by the government on suspicion of involvement in an alleged 1981 coup. The party resumed activities after the temporary suspension.

The last president of the party was Shaykh Muħammad ʻAlī al-Mahfūð, a longtime opposition figure and a close aid to Āyatu l-Lāh al-Mudarrisī. Its vice-president was Salah al-Khawāja.

While the party was allied with fellow Shīʻa Islamists al Wefaq, although the relationship was difficult: Shaykh al-Mahfūð said that attempts were being made by ʻAlī Salman and others to marginalise the party into its "Shirāzī base". The Islamic Action demanded al-Wefaq's support in several constituencies in the 2006 election, although the Islamic Action's spokesman Jawad ʻAbdu l-Waħab said that no decision had till then been made regarding election participation although they did take part. This led one commentator to accuse the party of having a stance "based on self-serving interests but under glossy principles to boost its prestige". Discussion about participation in elections prompted Vice President Salah Khawaja to resign from the party in March 2006 and announce his retirement from politics.

Before February 2011, Islamic Action Society decided to support the Bahraini uprising. During February and March 2011, many representatives of Amal joined anti-Monarchy protesters in Lulu Square and vowed not to enter any dialogue until King Hamad relinquished his office. As a result, the government arrested all the prominent leaders of Amal and closed its headquarters, dissolving the party.

== See also ==
- List of Islamic political parties
- List of political parties in Bahrain
