= National Democratic Action Society =

Left-wing political party in Bahrain

National Democratic Labour Action Society – Wa'ad جمعية العمل الوطني الديمقراطي – وعد
- Abbreviation: NDAS
- General Secretary: Fouad Seyadi
- Founder: Abdulrahman al-Nuaimi
- Founded: 2002; 24 years ago
- Banned: 2017
- Preceded by: Popular Front for the Liberation of Bahrain
- Headquarters: Manama, Bahrain
- Student wing: Student Change Bloc
- Youth wing: Youth Bureau — Wa'ad
- Ideology: Arab nationalism; Left-wing nationalism; Socialism; Secularism
- Political position: Left-wing
- International affiliation: Progressive Alliance
- Colors: Orange
- Slogan: نعمل من أجل وطن لايرجف فيه الأمل

Website
- waad.me

The National Democratic Labour Action Society – Wa'ad (Arabic: جمعية العمل الوطني الديمقراطي – وعد, romanized: Jamʻīyat al-ʻAmal al-Waṭanī al-Dīmuqrāṭī – Waʻd, NDAS) is Bahrain's largest leftist political party.

== History and profile ==
It emerged from the Popular Front for the Liberation of Bahrain, a Marxist-Leninist armed opposition movement that emerged from the Popular Front for the Liberation of the Occupied Arabian Gulf during the Dhofar War. Under the reform process initiated by Bahrain's King Hamad, the leaders of the Popular Front returned from exile to participate in the political process through the National Democratic Labour Action (NDLA).

The NDLA's leaders supported Beijing during the 1960s Left-Left split in the Arab world between the pro-Moscow camp and the pro-China camp. The party is the first licensed political group in any of the Arab states of the Persian Gulf.

Historically, the Left in Bahrain had been very strong, partly as a result of the creation of a local working class through the Kingdom's industrialisation with the discovery of oil in the 1930s; however the waning of Arab nationalism, the collapse of communism as an ideology and the rise of the Islamist Right have marginalised the NDLA and robbed it of much of its traditional support. The party was established by returning exiles in 2002.

The current leader of the party is Fouad Seyadi, who was elected after the general assembly of the party in November 2016. One of the current known figures of the party is Ibrahim Sharif Al-Sayed, who took over from Abdul-Rahman Al Nuaimi in 2005 until 2012. In 2005 the party renamed itself Wa'ad (Arabic: وعد), which translates to "Promise". Other prominent members include: Abdul-Nabi Alekri, Ebrahim KamalAldeen, Sami Seyadi, Ali Salih and Munira Fakhro.

The party suffered a very disappointing result in the 2002 municipal elections when none of its candidates were elected in any constituency. Despite this, the NDLA's leaders are widely respected and retain a great deal of influence in Bahraini society. The party boycotted the 2002 parliamentary elections, but took part in the Bahraini parliamentary election of 2006; among its candidates was its vice president and former Harvard academic, Munira Fakhro, who contested an Isa Town constituency against Salah Ali of Al-Menbar Islamic Society.

In June 2017, the party was banned on terrorism charges. The ban was criticised by Amnesty International and Bahrain Institute for Rights and Democracy. Lynn Maalouf of Amnesty International called the suspension of Waad "a flagrant attack on freedom of expression and association".

== Organizational structure ==
The highest authority of Wa'ad is its General Assembly, which meets every 2 years, and all active members of Wa'ad are eligible to attend those meetings. The General Assembly elects a Central Committee which holds the legislative power until the next General Assembly. The Central Committee elects in its first meeting a General Secretary and a political bureau which act as governing body for the party until the next General Assembly.

== See also ==
- Popular Front for the Liberation of Bahrain
- National Liberation Front – Bahrain
- Progressive Democratic Tribune
- Ibrahim Sharif
- Munira Fakhro
- Bahrain election 2006 women candidates
- List of political parties in Bahrain
