= Al Wefaq =

Legally dissolved Shi'a political party in Bahrain

Al-Wefaq National Islamic Society جمعية الوفاق الوطني الإسلامية - الوفاق
- Leader: Hussain Al Daihi (Deputy General Secretary)
- General Secretary: Ali Salman
- Spokesperson: Khalil al-Marzooq
- Founded: 7 November 2001
- Banned: 17 July 2016
- Headquarters: Zinj, Bahrain
- Student wing: Student First Bloc
- Youth wing: Bahrain Youth Center
- Ideology: Islamic democracy
- Religion: Shi'a Islam
- Colors: Blue
- Slogan: ديرتنا.. نحميها (We protect our country)
- Council of Representatives: 0 / 40
- Shura Council: 0 / 40

Website
- alwefaq.org

Al-Wefaq National Islamic Society (Arabic: جمعية الوفاق الوطني الإسلامية; Jam'īyat al-Wifāq al-Waṭanī al-Islāmīyah), sometimes shortened to simply Al-Wefaq, was a Shi'a Bahraini political party that operates clandestinely after being ordered by the highest court in Bahrain to be closed. Although from 2006 to 2011 it was by far the single largest party in the Bahraini legislature, with 18 representatives in the 40-member Bahraini parliament, it was often outvoted by coalition blocs of opposition Sunni parties and independent MPs reflecting gerrymandering of electoral districts. On 27 February 2011, the 18 Al-Wefaq members of parliament submitted letters of resignation to protest regime violence against pro-reform Bahraini protestors.

Al Wefaq's religious orientation is Shi'a and it is led by a cleric, Ali Salman. The party is close to a Shi'a clerical body in Bahrain, the Islamic Scholars Council, which describes Al Wefaq as the 'Bloc of Believers'. In 2006, the pro-government English newspaper Gulf Daily News alleged that Al Wefaq had only 1,500 active members, although Al Wefaq itself claims to have 80,000 members and a leaked diplomatic briefing from the US Embassy in Bahrain described Al Wefaq as the largest political society in Bahrain in terms of membership.

Al Wefaq boycotted the 2002 general election, the first parliamentary elections held in the country since 1973, claiming that the 2002 constitution gave too much power to the unelected upper house, the Consultative Council of Bahrain, whose members are directly appointed by the King. In the 2006 election Al Wefaq received the backing of the Islamic Scholars Council which helped it win seventeen of the eighteen seats it contested. In the 2010 election, they increased their representation by one seat, winning all the constituencies they contested, to take 18 of the 40 available parliamentary seats. Following the 2011 Arab Spring, Al-Wefaq and other opposition groups boycotted the 2014 election.

On 17 July 2016, Saudi-owned Al Arabiya television and international print media reported that Bahrain's highest court had dissolved al-Wefaq and liquidated the group's funds. The decision was condemned by the U.S. State Department.

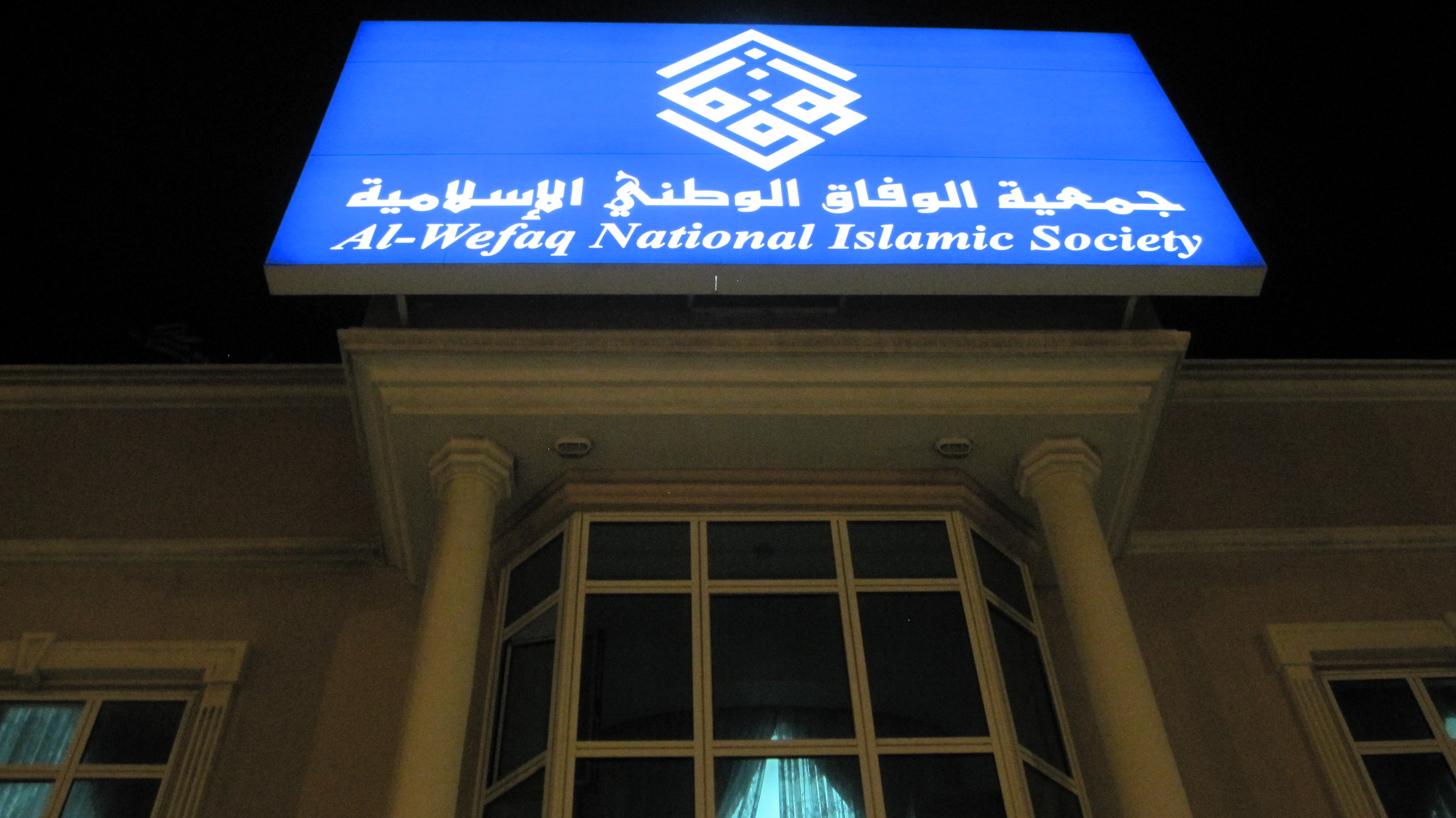
Wefaq party headquarters in Zinj, Bahrain.

== History ==
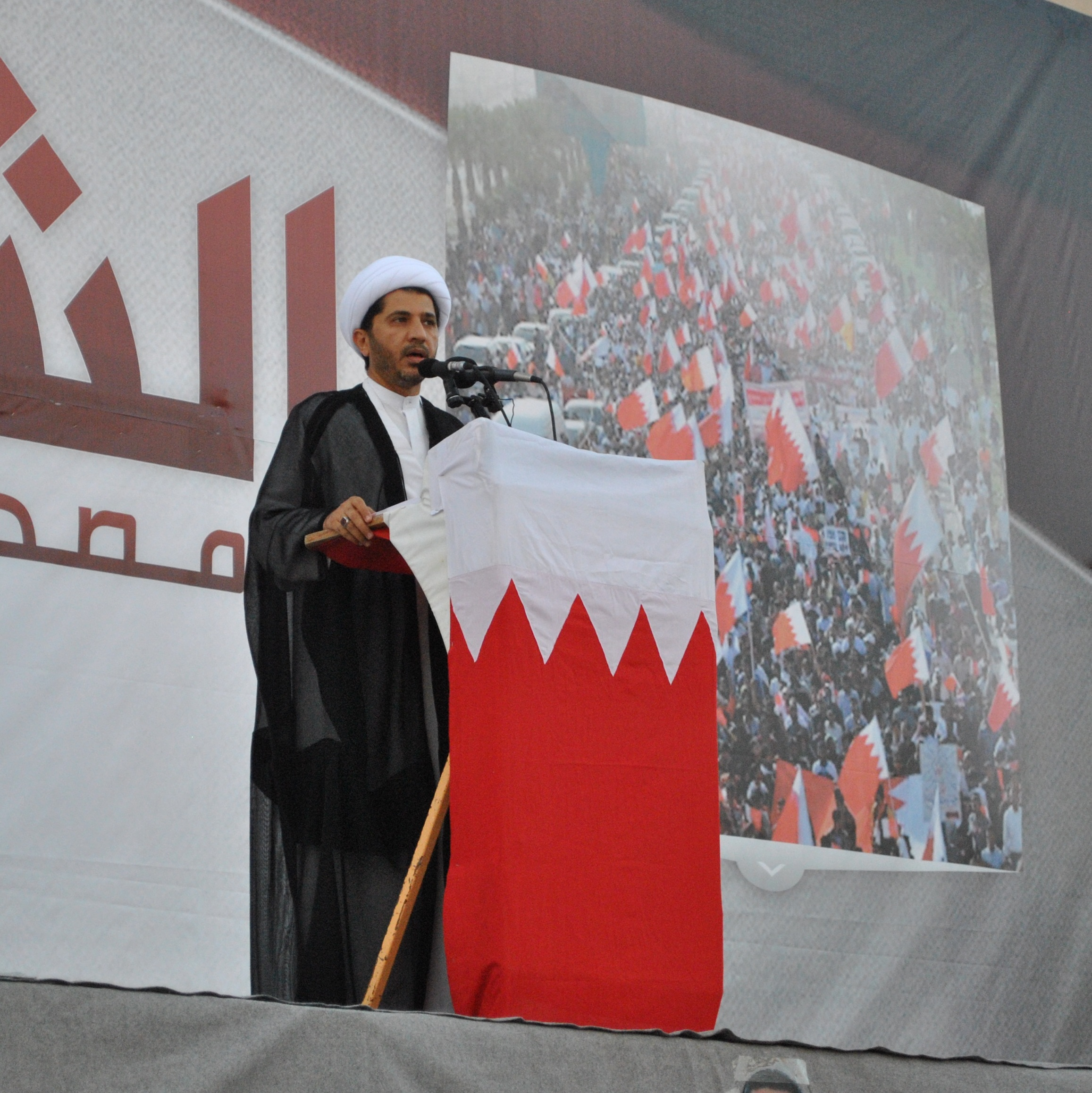
Ali Salman delivering a speech during a pro-democracy sit-in in Muqsha'a

A number of Al Wefaq's leaders returned to Bahrain under the reform process initiated by HRH King Hamad when he inherited the throne and pardoned all the political activists of the 1990s political unrest. Its leadership backed HRH King Hamad's National Charter for political reforms after the King assured the country's leading opposition clerics, through a signed statement in the house of a leading religious figure, Sayed Alawi al-Ghuraifi, that only the elected chamber of parliament would have legislative power, as stipulated by the 1973 Constitution.

However the Al Wefaq leadership withdrew support when the ruling regime later announced the 2002 Constitution which mandated a chamber, appointed directly by the King, that would have the same legislative power the elected chamber has. Al Wefaq boycotted the 2002 parliamentary election, with three other political societies: the former Maoist National Democratic Action Society, Baath affiliated Nationalist Democratic Rally Society and Islamic Action Society. Opposition political groups accused the King of unilaterally enacting the constitution though such an important document requiring multilateral agreement in order to be binding. However Al-Wefaq did put forward candidates for the municipal elections that occurred in the same year as they believed that municipal candidates will deal with servicing issues rather than politics which should not be affected much by the changes made in 2002 Constitution.

The U.S. Assistant Secretary of State for Democracy, Human Rights, and Labor, Tom Malinowski, on a visit to Bahrain in July 2014 was ordered to leave the country after meeting with members of Al-Wefaq. The United States issued a statement reaffirming its support for Bahrain but maintained it was normal diplomatic protocol for its representatives to meet with opposition parties.

== Organizational structure ==
=== General Conference ===
The regulatory organ which has the supreme authority, and modifies the statute, and elects the Secretary-General, his deputy, and the members of the Consultative Council, and the arbitral tribunal.

=== General Secretariat ===
It is the executive body of the society which is responsible for making the policies, plans & political guidelines & their execution, and taking decisions on the current issues unless it requires a decision to be made by the general conference.

The Current general secretary is shaikh Ali Salman.

=== Arbitral tribunal ===
It is a council, which resolves the disputes and disagreements related to the internal activities of the society.

=== Consultative Council ===
Its responsibility is to oversee & appraise the performance of General Secretariat and to give reviews about performance levels.

== Activities Finance ==
It is stated in the society's statute the following as means of finance acceptable by law:

- Membership annual fees
- Earnings and benefits resulting from the investment of its funds
- Grants from the state
- Donations & contributions

above all of this, Al Wefaq has taken a decision prior to 2006 elections mandates all its MPs to contribute 20% of the basic salary toward the society. Basic salary for MPs is 2000 BHD per month thus annual MPs contribution to society amount is $230,000 which forms the biggest portion of society's budget.

== Subsidiaries ==
=== Bahrain Youth Center ===
Being the youth wing of the society, the center is concerned with the issues of youth generation related to politics, social & student affairs. When it was established, the first president was Matar Matar who lately became MP for Al Wefaq.

== Presence in the country ==
- Hamad Town
- Al Zinj
- Al Qufool

== Political ideology ==
As with any religious party in the world, Al Wefaq has had to address the relationship between spiritual and secular authority. On the contentious issue of reform of Bahrain's family laws, Al Wefaq stated in October 2005 that neither elected MPs nor the government has the authority to change the law because these institutions could 'misinterpret the word of God'. Instead, Al Wefaq insisted that the right to legislate on issues relating to women and families is solely that of religious leaders.

Further, the society's legislators argued that the political landscape in the country, where electoral districts are drawn to reflect wishes of the authorities, could not guarantee future non-interference by the authorities for modify the law to meet their agenda. There have been some differences among western analysts as to the role played by ideology in Al Wefaq's agenda: according to Dr Toby Jones of Swarthmore College, "Al Wefaq does not espouse a specific ideological vision"; while Steven Cook of the Council on Foreign Relations has described Al Wefaq's policies towards women as "outrageous".

In a show of strength against a demonstration by women's rights activists, on 9 November 2005 Al Wefaq jointly organised with clerics a much larger counter demonstration against the Supreme Council for Women's (secular women organization) campaign for the introduction of a personal status law.

MPs from the society (and the main opposition group) walked out of the Bahrain parliament on 8 May 2007 in protest after their request for a corruption investigation of State Minister of Cabinet Affairs Sheikh Ahmed bin Ateyatalla Al Khalifa, a member of the royal family, was denied. The forty-member lower chamber dismissed the motion as only nineteen lawmakers voted in favor of the investigation, two votes short of the majority needed. Ever since entering into the 2006 parliament, Al Wefaq had undertaken steps to go after individuals widely accused wrongdoing activities such as financial and administrative corruption and discriminatory practices.

== Participation in The National Council ==
=== 2002 elections boycott ===
Al Wefaq boycotted the 2002 general election, the first parliamentary elections held in the country since 1973, for many reasons including :

1. that the 2002 constitution came with sole discretion of King Hamad where he made major changes to the constitution of 1973 without voting on it by Bahraini citizens.
2. the unelected upper house, the Consultative Council of Bahrain, has been given similar powers to the elected Parliament Council although its members are directly appointed by the King.
3. Unfair distribution of population among Electoral district by which in some cases the vote of one citizen in an Electoral district is equal to the vote of 16 citizen in another district.

=== 2006 elections ===
Al Wefaq announced that it would reverse its elections boycott and participate in the 2006 parliamentary election. The party hoped to win 12–14 seats in the poll to take place in November 2006. The party has denied that it will not field any women candidates, dismissing the allegations as "pure speculation". Along with Salafists, such as Ali Mattar, the party objects to the government's ban on candidates using religious sermons to promote their election campaigns. A noted religious figure from Al Wefaq, Jassim Al Khayat, has commented: "The ban is senseless because the mosque, as an integral part of people's daily lives, has always been close to the political scene."

Salafist MP Jassim Al Saeedi campaigned to get the party banned from standing in the poll on the grounds that the party did not recognize the 2002 Constitution. When his demands were rejected by the government, Mr Saeedi accused the Minister of Justice, Dr Mohammed Al Sitri, of being the party's 'front man' and acting as their 'lawyer'. Mr Saeedi told Dr Al Sitri during a session of parliament: "It seems they chose you to be their front man, because you are defending them well."

The parliamentary election campaigns of Al Wefaq members put many of the current hot issues in the political scene to the surface. For example, Al Wefaq extensively used the Bandargate scandal in its campaigns and promised to question and punish those responsible for it. Moreover, Al Wefaq raised serious concerns over the election results and questioned many aspects of the election process. Indeed, accusations of fraud as well as the lack of transparency were raised shortly before the start of elections.

17 out of 18 candidates from Al Wefaq won the 2006 parliamentary elections. 62% of Bahraini voters voted for Al Wefaq and they hold 42.5% of the seats in the elected chamber of the parliament (out of a total of 40 seats) making them the strongest political party in Bahrain in terms of the number of supporters and representatives in the elected chamber of the parliament. In addition, Al-Wefaq backed liberal candidate secured another seat.

=== 2010 elections ===
Following a wave of arrests prior to the election, Al Wefaq won at least 18 of the 40 seats to the lower house.
Though representing 45% of the seats, the legislators had secured 64% of the popular vote. The difference reflects gerrymandering of electoral districts in the absence of universal principle of one person one vote. Voters in five districts won by Al Wefaq independently surpassed the number of voters in five other districts collectively.

Incumbent MPs who succeeded achieving landslide victories in 2010 parliamentary elections were:

- Khalil Al-Marzooq
- Abduljalil Khalil
- Jawad Fairooz

=== Withdrawal of the parliament bloc in 2011 ===
On 18 February 2011, Al Wefaq pulled its parliament bloc which consists of 18 MPs out of total 40 MPs following the killing of two protesters by the Bahraini police during the Bahrain uprising.

== Electoral history ==
=== Council of Representatives elections ===
Election	Leader	Votes	%	Seats		Position
2006	Ali Salman			17 / 40	▲17	▲1st
2010	Ali Salman	82,838		18 / 40	▲1	1st
2014	Ali Salman	Boycotted		0 / 40	▼18	
2018	Ali Salman	Barred		0 / 40	Steady	

== See also ==
- List of Islamic political parties
- List of political parties in Bahrain
