= Mahmoud Al Mahmoud =

Bahraini politician

Mahmoud Yousef Al Mahmoud (Arabic: محمود يوسف المحمود, 1954) is a Bahraini marine captain, politician, and former member of the Council of Representatives.

== Education ==
Al Mahmoud was born in Muharraq in 1954. He obtained a second mate certificate in May 1978, a chief mate certificate in June 1981, and his master's captain degree in October 1984, all from the United Kingdom. He also earned an advanced certificate in marine navigation studies in June 1988 and a certificate of excellence in port studies that November from the Royal Norwegian Naval Academy. In June 1995, he earned an international certificate in port management from the Royal Naval College of the Netherlands, followed by a certificate in democratic leadership from the Federal Executive Institute in the United States of America in September 1996. Finally, he earned an International Management Program certificate from the University of New Orleans in April 2001 and an honorary doctorate in marine education and studies from Oxford University in September 2010.

== Career ==
From 1973 to 1984, he worked as a marine officer on ships of the British P&O shipping company as well as those of the United Arab Shipping Company. He also piloted a variety of marine vessels at Mina Salman from October 1984 to February 1989. Promoted to manager of captains in February 1989, he served director of the Khalifa bin Salman Port project from April 1990 to July 1994. From July 1994 to January 1996, he led the Stevedoring Department of the Directorate of Sea Ports, followed by the Director Generalship itself as Assistant Undersecretary from January 1996 to 2002. From 2002 to 2007, he served as Media Undersecretary of the Ministry of Transportation. He owned the Bahrain Tribune, published briefly in English from March 2007 to March 2008, and founded an investment firm named Ajyal Capital in April 2008, including a consultancy division started that December. He became editor-in-chief of the Bahrain Tribune in September 2010.

In the 2010 Bahraini general election, he won the fourth district seat in the Muharraq Governorate with 3,418 votes for 52.58%, just 336 votes more than his runoff opponent, Abdul Basit Al-Shaer of the Al-Menber Islamic Society. In the 2014 Bahraini general election, he switched to the fifth seat in the Governorate, losing with 1,020 votes or 16.67%.
