= Adel Al Asoomi =

Bahraini politician (born 1969)

- عادل العسومي

Member of the Council of Representatives (Bahrain)
- Incumbent
- Assumed office 2006
- Monarch: Hamad bin Isa Al Khalifa
- Prime Minister: Khalifa bin Salman Al Khalifa, Salman, Crown Prince of Bahrain
- Preceded by: Saadi Muhammad
- Parliamentary group: independent
- Constituency: First District of the Capital Governorate

Speaker of the Arab Parliament
- In office October 2020 – 26 October 2024
- Preceded by: Mishaal Al-Salami
- Succeeded by: Mohamed Ahmed Al Yamahi

Personal details
- Born: Adel Abdulrahman Al Asoomi; January 1, 1969 (age 57) Manama, Bahrain

Adel Abdulrahman Al Asoomi (Arabic: عادل عبد الرحمن العسومي; born January 1, 1969) is a Bahraini businessman and politician. A member of the Council of Representatives, the lower house of Parliament in Bahrain, since 2006, he succeeded Mishaal Al-Salami as Speaker of the Arab Parliament in October 2020.

== Career ==
Al Asoomi was born in Manama. He earned a high school diploma in 1987.

Al Asoomi served as Chairman of the Finance Committee of the Bahrain Volleyball Association (BVA) as well as Chairman of the Commercial and Financial Investment Committee at Busaiteen Club in 1996 and 2006. He was also vice-president of the Supreme Organizing Committee at the Club and its president for a time. In 2000, he worked as an auditor at the Asian Volleyball Confederation. Since 2005, he has chaired the Bahrain Mind and Electronic Sports Federation. Other posts he has held include President of the West Asian Chess Federation.

In the 2002 Bahraini general election, he lost the runoff for the First District of the Capital Governorate with 373 votes for 43.83%, defeated by Saadi Muhammad of the Al-Menber Islamic Society. However, Al Asoomi won their rematch in the 2006 Bahraini general election with 2,383 votes for 68.62%, a 1,293-vote margin. In the 2010 Bahraini general election, he won with 1,878 votes for 65.30%, followed by a 2014 Bahraini general election runoff win with 2,265 votes for 54.50%, a 374-vote margin over Al-Menber's candidate Khalid Sulaibikh.
