= Ahmed Yousef Al Ansari =

Bahraini politician, banker, and trade unionist

Member of the Council of Representatives
- In office 2010–2014
- Monarch: Hamad bin Isa Al Khalifa
- Prime Minister: Khalifa bin Salman Al Khalifa
- Parliamentary group: Al Asalah
- Constituency: Seventh District of the Central Governorate

Member of the Council of Representatives
- Incumbent
- Assumed office 2014
- Monarch: Hamad bin Isa Al Khalifa
- Prime Minister: Khalifa bin Salman Al Khalifa, Salman, Crown Prince of Bahrain
- Parliamentary group: Al Asalah
- Constituency: Third District of the Southern Governorate

Personal details
- Born: Ahmed Youssef Abdel Qader Mohammed Al Ansari; 1967 (age 58–59)
- Occupation: politician

Ahmed Yousef Abdel Qader Mohammed Al Ansari (Arabic: أحمد يوسف عبد القادر محمد الأنصاري, born in 1967) is a Bahraini politician, banker, and trade unionist. He has been in the Council of Representatives since winning a seat in the 2010 Bahraini general election.

== Biography ==
Al Ansari is descended from the Banu Aws and Banu Khazraj tribes of Medina. He obtained a high school diploma.

In the 2010 election, he ran for the Council of Representatives in the Seventh District of the Central Governorate for the Al Asalah Islamic Society, a Sunni Salafist party. He received 2,868 votes in the first round for 53.40%.

In the 2014 Bahraini general election, he ran for the Third District of the Southern Governorate. He won 3,087 votes for 53.01% in the first round.

In the 2018 Bahraini general election, he ran again for the same constituency as in 2014, this time winning 3,784 votes for 54.90% in the first round on November 24.
