= Ebtisam Hejres =

Bahraini politician (born 1960)

Ebtisam Hejres (Arabic: ابتسام هجرس, born 1 January 1960, Al-Muharraq) is a Bahraini politician. She was a Member of the Council of Representatives of Bahrain from to 2011–2014, a founding member of both the Coalition of Arab Women Parliamentarians Against Violence Against Women and the Arab Women Parliamentarians Network for Equality and has served as Secretary General of The Arakan Rohingya National Organisation (ARNO) from 2015.

== Career ==
Hejres worked as Executive Secretary at United Arab Shipping Company from 1979 to 1982.

At the 2010 Bahraini general election, Hejres was elected as a Member of the Council of Representatives of Bahrain (Arabic: مجلس النواب, romanized: Majlis an-nuwa, the lower house of the Bahraini National Assembly), serving from 2011 to 2014. She was a founding member of both the Coalition of Arab Women Parliamentarians Against Violence Against Women and the Arab Women Parliamentarians Network for Equality.

Hejres ran as a candidate for the second time during the 2014 Bahraini general election. During her campaigning, a video went viral showing her sitting with a group of naturalised Bahrainis of Indian origin and speaking to them in their native language. She lost the election and did not retain the seat.

Hejres has served as Secretary General of The Arakan Rohingya National Organisation (ARNO) from 2015, an organisation which advocates for the rights of the Rohingya people.

In 2018, Hejres called for revoking the Nobel Prize from Aung San Suu Kyi, the de facto leader of Myanmar.
