= Ahmed Al Mulla =

Bahraini politician

- أحمد إبراهيم راشد الملا

Member of the Council of Representatives
- In office 2010–2018
- Monarch: Hamad bin Isa Al Khalifa
- Prime Minister: Khalifa bin Salman Al Khalifa
- Constituency: 3rd constituency (Southern Governorate, 10th constituency (Southern Governorate

Speaker of the Council of Representatives of Bahrain
- In office 14 December 2014 – 13 December 2018
- Monarch: Hamad bin Isa Al Khalifa
- Preceded by: Khalifa Al Dhahrani
- Succeeded by: Fawzia Zainal

Personal details
- Born: Ahmed Ibrahim Rashid Al Mulla; 1962 (age 63–64) Muharraq, Bahrain
- Education: United Arab Emirates University, American University Washington College of Law

Ahmed Ibrahim Rashid Al Mulla (Arabic: أحمد إبراهيم راشد الملا) is a Bahraini soldier, lawyer, and politician. He served as the Speaker of the Council of Representatives from 2014 to 2018.

== Biography ==
Al Mulla was born in Muharraq in 1962. He earned a Bachelor of Laws from the United Arab Emirates University in 1984 and a Master of Laws in International Law from American University’s Washington College of Law in 1995.

He worked as a legal officer in the General Command of the Bahrain Defence Force from 1985 to 1987, then spent time as a prosecutor and judge in military courts from 1995 to 1998. From 1998 to 2001, he was delegated as a legal advisor to the Ministry of Foreign Affairs. From 2001 to 2005, he served as Chief Military Prosecutor before being promoted to Acting Director of the Military Judicial Directorate from 2005 to 2006. His last two judicial posts were as Head of Legal Affairs at the Ministry of Defense (thus President of the Supreme Military Court of Appeal) from 2006 to 2008 and Legal Advisor to the Ministry of Cabinet Affairs from 2008 to 2010.

== Parliament ==
In the 2010 Bahraini general election, Al Mulla won in a runoff for the third constituency of the Southern Governorate with 71.99% of the vote (2,012 votes). In the 2014 Bahraini general election, he won the tenth seat in the same Governorate with 80.27% of the vote (834 votes). In the internal elections afterward, he was voted Speaker of the Council.

== After politics ==
Al Mulla was appointed in September 2019 by order of the King of Bahrain, Hamad bin Isa Al Khalifa, as Vice-President of the Constitutional Court with the rank of minister.
