= Islam in Bahrain =

Islam is the state religion in Bahrain. Due to an influx of immigrants and guest workers from India, the Philippines and Sri Lanka, the overall percentage of Muslims has declined since the late 20th century. Bahrain's 2010 census indicated that 90.2% of the population was Muslim.

In 2011, a Bahraini official document reported that Sunni Islam had become a slight 51% majority while Shia population had declined to 49%. Other unofficial sources estimate sectarian identification to be approximately 55% Sunni and 45% Shia.

There has been a decline in the Shia Muslim population and a massive increase in Sunni Muslim population in Bahrain as of 2021 due to the increasing rates of political naturalisation and citizenship grants to Sunni migrants, as well as Sunni Muslims in Bahrain having a higher proportion of young people, and a higher fertility rate.

== History ==
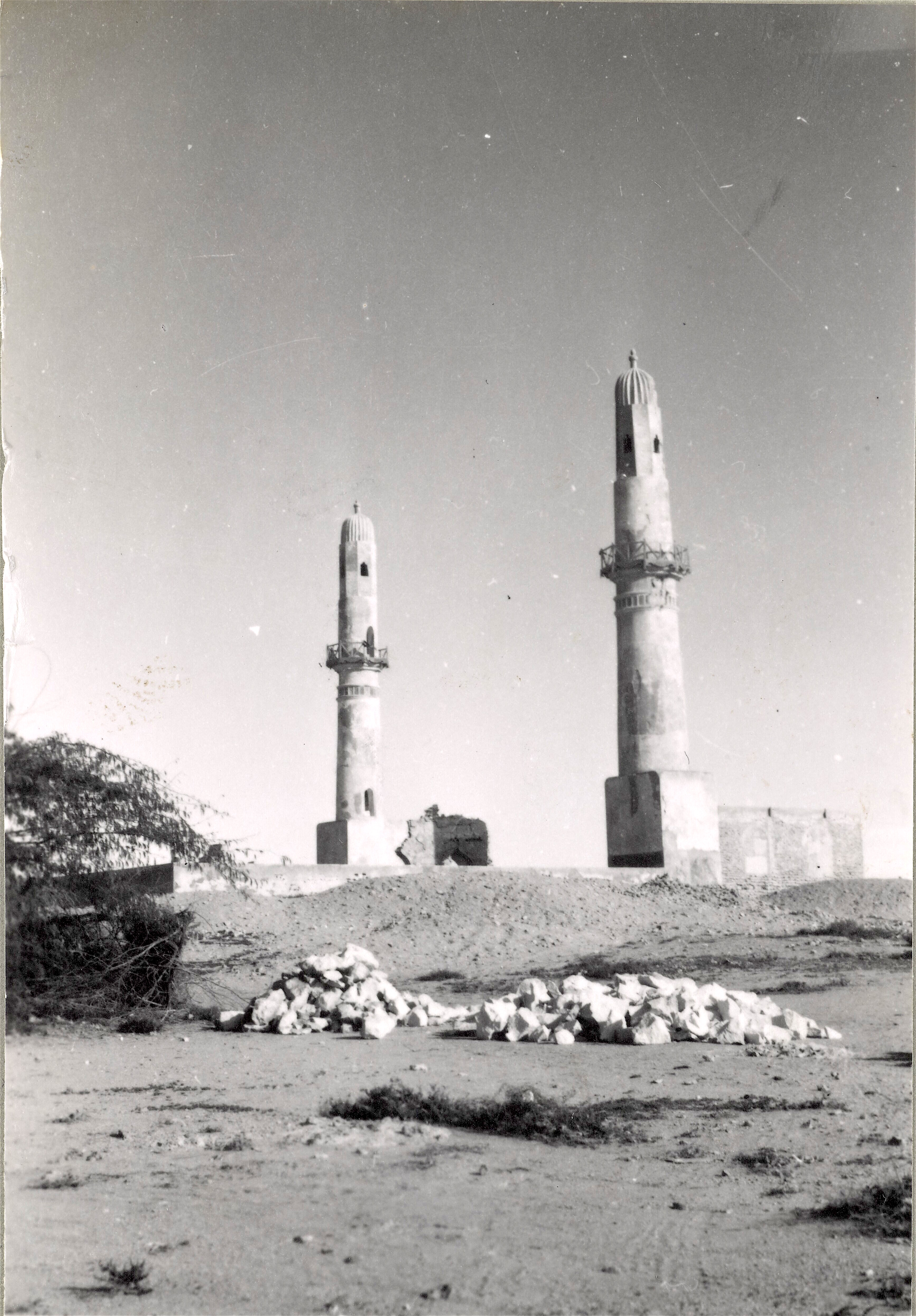
The Khamis Mosque in 1956.

Prior to Islam, the inhabitants of Qatar and Bahrain practiced Arabian paganism. In 628 AD the Islamic prophet Muhammad sent his first envoy Al-Ala'a Al-Hadrami to Munzir ibn Sawa Al Tamimi, ruler of the historical region of Bahrain, which extended from the coast from Kuwait to the south of Qatar including Al-Hasa, Qatif, and the Bahrain Islands, to engage in da'wah and spread the teachings of Islam. Munzir subsequently converted to Islam as did many of his subjects.

The origins of Shia Islam in Bahrain can be traced back to 656–661 AD, the caliphate reign of Ali ibn Abi Talib. The prophet Muhammad appointed Aban Ibn Sa'id Al As (Arabic: أبان ابن سعيد العاص) as governor of Bahrain during his lifetime. Aban was a major supporter of Ali's right to the caliphate, a position that was endorsed by the inhabitants of Bahrain including the influential Bani Abdul Qays tribe. The Khamis Mosque is believed to be the oldest mosque in Bahrain, with its origin dating back to the reign of Caliph Umar II.

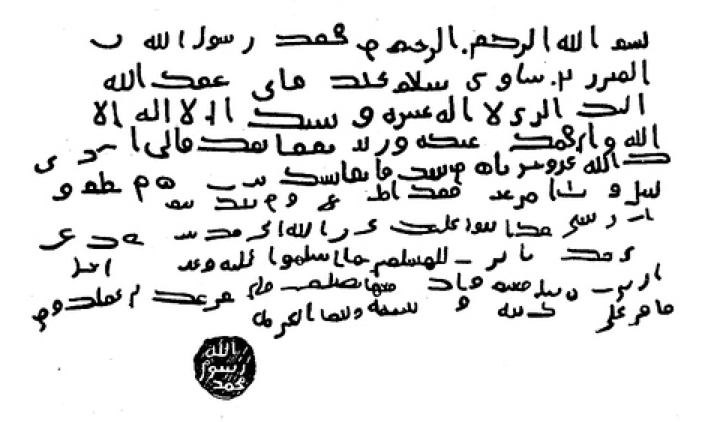
The letter sent by Muhammad to Munzir ibn Sawa Al Tamimi, the governor of Bahrain at the time.

The Ismaili Shia sect known at the Qarmatians seized Bahrain in 899 AD, making it their stronghold and base of operations. They raided Iraq and in 930 sacked Mecca, desecrating the Zamzam Well with the bodies of Hajj pilgrims and taking the Black Stone with them back to Bahrain where it remained for twenty years. The Qarmatians were eventually defeated by the Abbasids in 976 and afterwards their power waned.

The defeat of the Qarmatian state saw the gradual wane of their revolutionary brand of Ismaili Islam. Instead, under a process encouraged by Sunni rulers over the next four hundred years, Twelver Shia Islam became entrenched. According to historian Juan Cole, Sunnis favoured the quietist Twelver branch of Shi'ism over the Qarmatians and promoted its development in Bahrain. In the 13th century, there arose what was termed the 'Bahrain School', which integrated themes of philosophy and mysticism into orthodox Twelver practise. The school produced the theologians Sheikh Kamal al-Din Ibn Sa’adah al Bahrani (d. 1242), Sheikh Jamal al-Din ‘Ali --- ibn Sulayman al-Bahrani (d. 1271), and Sheikh Maitham Al Bahrani (d. 1280).

The 1941 census to include sectarian identification reported 55% as Shia and 45 per cent as Sunni of the Muslim population.

== Present day (2021) ==
Unofficial sources estimate sectarian identification to be approximately 49% Shia and 51% Sunni. There has been a massive increase in Sunni Muslim population in Bahrain as of 2021 due to the increasing rates of political naturalisation of Sunni migrants, as well as Sunni Muslims in Bahrain having a high proportion of young people, and a high fertility rate.

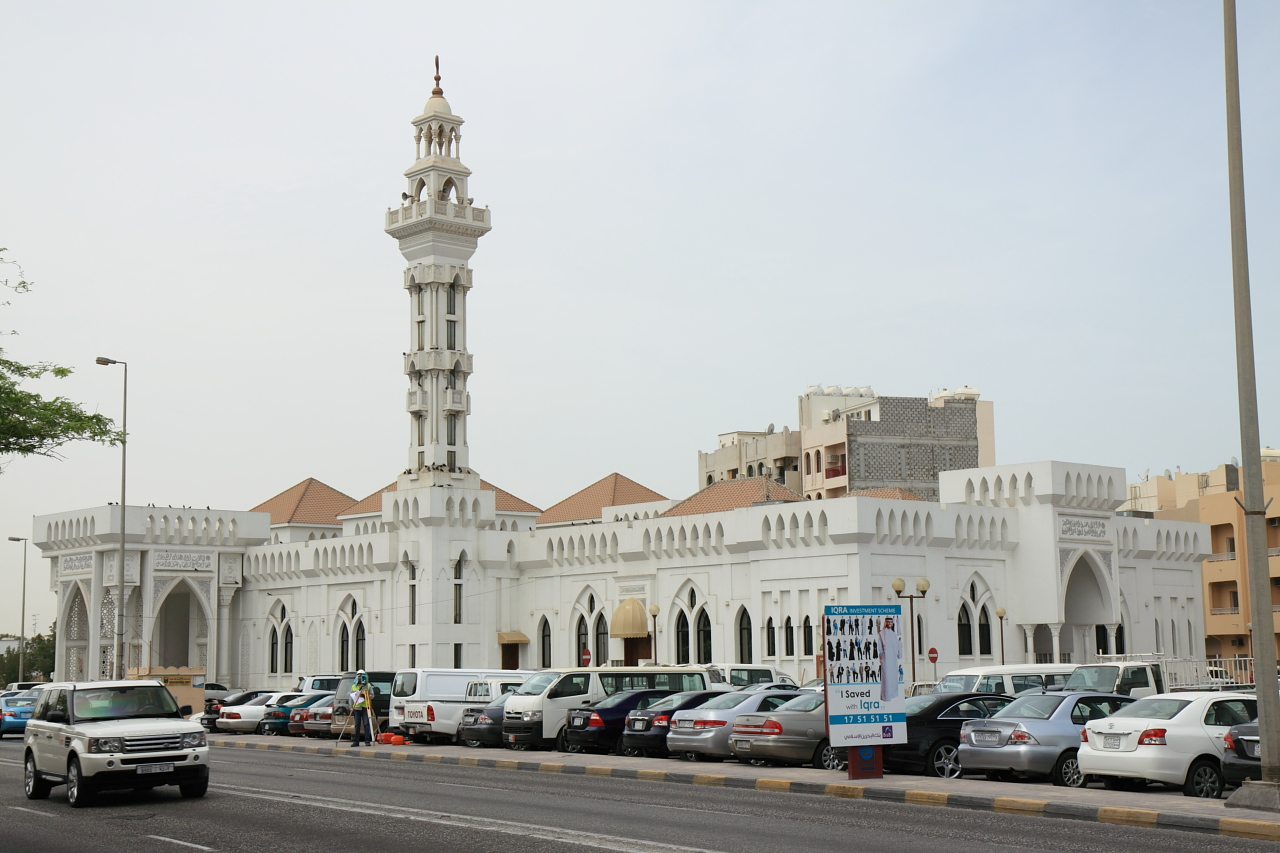
Gudaibiya mosque, in Manama.

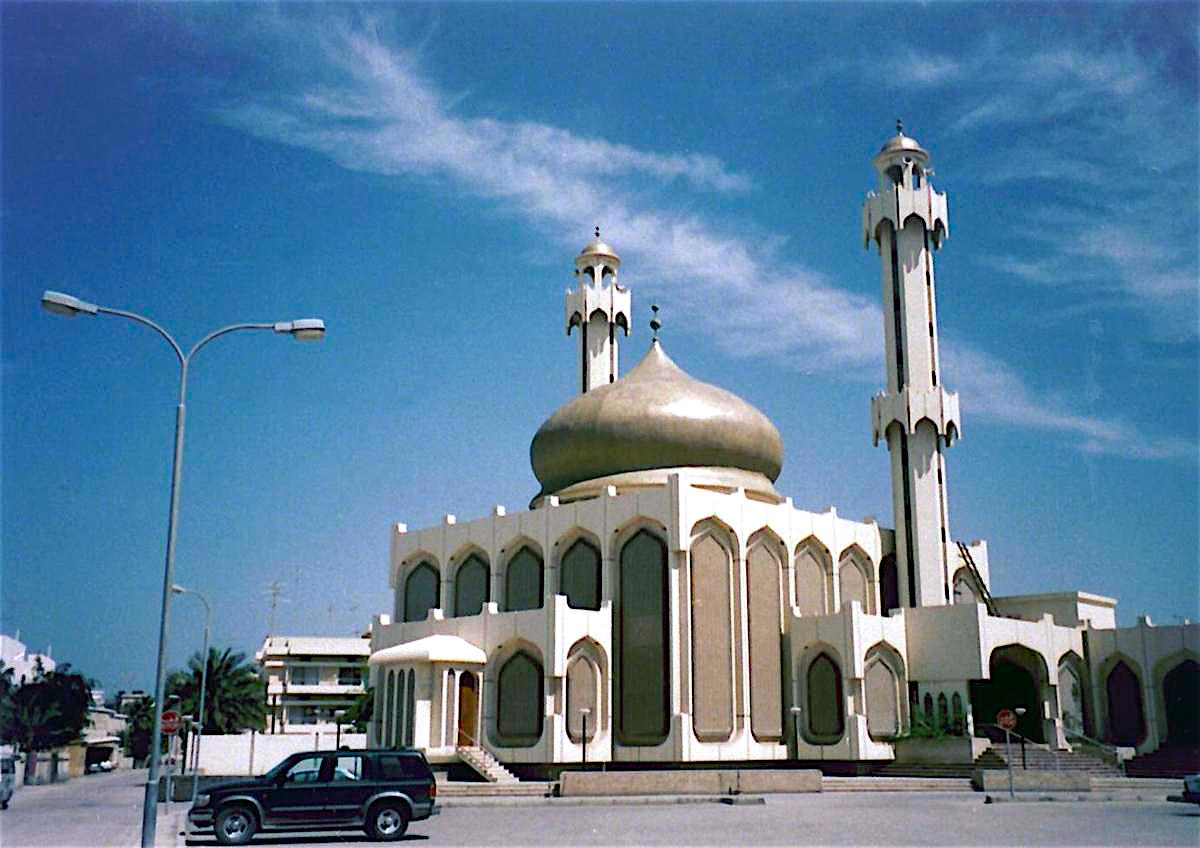
Adliya mosque in Bahrain

The country observes the Muslim feasts of Eid al-Adha, Eid al-Fitr, Muhammad's birthday (Mawlid), and the Islamic New Year as national holidays.

"Political liberalisation" under King Hamad has seen Islamist parties contest Bahrain's elections and become a dominant force in parliament. Sunni Islamist parties, the Salafi Asalah and the Muslim Brotherhood affiliated Al-Menbar Islamic Society are two of the largest parties in parliament, while the Shia Al Wefaq was expected to become the dominating party after 2006's general election having boycotted the 2002 poll. In the 2006 election Wefaq received the backing of the Islamic Scholars Council which helped it win seventeen of the eighteen seats it contested. In the 2010 election, they increased their representation by one seat, winning all the constituencies they contested, to take 18 of the 40 available parliamentary seats. Since then, Shias have no representatives in the Bahraini rubber stamp parliament.

The government made successful efforts to erode the Shia citizen majority and tip the country's demographic balance in favor of the Sunni minority, which has now become the majority. This was due to the governmental recruitment of foreign-born Sunnis to serve in the security forces and become citizens. Meanwhile, hundreds of Bahrainis have had their citizenship revoked in recent years, including a number of Shiite leaders and activists. Since 2011, the government has maintained a heavy security presence in primarily Shia villages. Security personnel restrict the movements of Shia citizens and periodically destroy their property.

== See also ==
- Religion in Bahrain
- Beit Al Qur'an
- Muharram in Bahrain
- Rashid Al Marikhi
