= Islamic Society (Bahrain) =

Islamic organization based in Bahrain

The Islamic Society (Arabic: الجمعية الاسلامية) is a religious and social organization in Bahrain. It represents the traditionalist Sunni trend and is one of the three major Sunni religious organizations in Bahrain. (The two others being the Al Eslah Society and the Islamic Education Society).

The Society is endorsed by the Al Mahmood family, known for having several Al Azhar-trained ulema (clerics). The most prominent cleric is Dr. Abdul-Latif Al Mahmood who serves as the president of the Society.

The organization was founded in 1979 and has its current premises in the town of Arad.

== See also ==
- Isa al-Jowder
- Rashid Al Marikhi
- Islam in Bahrain
