= Salah Ali =

Bahraini politician

Salah bin Ali Mohammed Abdulrahman (Arabic: صلاح علي محمد عبد الرحمن) is a Bahraini former Minister and member of the Council of Representatives.

== Early life ==
Bin Ali was born in Manama.

== Education ==
- Bachelor of Medicine, Bachelor of Surgery from King Saud University in Riyadh, Saudi Arabia (1985)
- Certificate of Excellence to Practice Medicine from King Khalid University in Riyadh (1986)
- Master of Public Health in Family and Community Medicine from the American University of Beirut (1991)
- Doctorate in Family Medicine and Community Health from the Supreme Council of the Arab Board of Health Specializations (1992)
- Certificate of Administrative Supervision Skills and Certificate of Management and Leadership towards Excellence from the Training Department of the Ministry of Health (1993)
- Certificate of Population Communication and Family Planning from the Johns Hopkins Bloomberg School of Public Health (1994)
- Certificate in Management of Fundamentals of Health Care from the Royal College of Surgeons in Ireland (RCSI) (1995)
- Diploma in Healthcare Administration from the RCSI (1996)
- Certificate in Basics of HIV/AIDS and Master of Public Health with first-class honors in Health Education and Media from the University of South Carolina (1997)
- Diploma in International Public Health Management from the Centers for Disease Control and Prevention in Atlanta, Georgia (1997)
- Media Skills Certificate in Reproductive Health from Johns Hopkins University (1998)
- Certificate in Linguistics and Programming Science (2000)
- Certificate in Legislative Drafting Skills from the University of New Orleans (2003)

== Career before politics ==
Bin Ali worked as a resident physician at King Khalid University Hospital from 1986 to 1987, then returned to Bahrain to practice at Salmaniya Medical Complex from 1988 to 1989. He practiced at Al-Naim Health Center in the Family Medicine Program from 1989 to 1991. He was chief physician at Isa Town Health Center from 1991 to 1992, then at Budaiya Health Center from 1993 to 1994. The Ministry of Health appointed him Director of the Health Education Department from 1994 to 1996, then head of the Anti-Smoking Program from 1995 to 2002. He worked once again at Isa Town Health Center from 1998 to 2002.

He worked as an imam at the Khalid ibn al-Walid Mosque in Isa Town from 1988 to 1996, then at Nouf Al-Nassar Mosque in the same city from 1996 to 2000.

Bin Ali has held a number of other important posts, including the following:

- Chairman, Chief Medical Adviser, and Business Developer at MAM Drugs, Medical Devices and Health Foods
- International Ambassador for Social Responsibility, United Nations Global Compact
- Promotion for international efforts to manage the COVID-19 pandemic
- Chairman, Board of Trustees, International Campaign for Advocates of International Efforts to Combat the Novel Coronavirus
- Member, Arabia CSR Network
- Honorary member, International Federation for Social Responsibility, based in the United States of America
- Member, European Business Ethics Network, based in France
- Honorary President, Bahrain Anti-Smoking Association
- Honorary President, Bahrain Central Youth Center
- Chairman, Board of Directors, Arabian Gulf Company for Trade and Real Estate Investment
- Member, Board of Trustees, Jerusalem Endowment Fund

== Political career ==
Salah bin Ali joined the Al Eslah Society in Bahrain in 1996, heading its Youth Division from 1997 to 2000. He chaired the board of directors of its political wing, the Al-Menber Islamic Society, from 2002 to 2007. In the 2002 Bahraini general election, he ran for the fourth district in the Central Governorate and defeated Issa Makli, becoming the head of Al-Menber in the Council of Representatives until 2006. In the 2006 Bahraini general election, he defeated Munira Fakhro (the candidate of the National Democratic Action Society with 4,066 votes, only 906 more for 53.64%. Following his re-election, he rose to become the Second Deputy Speaker.

He decided to not run in the 2010 Bahraini general election, since King Hamad bin Isa Al Khalifa appointed him to the Consultative Council. From April 2012 to December 2014, he served as Minister for Human Rights Affairs.
