= Ibrahim Al-Nafei =

Bahraini politician (born 1985)

- إبراهيم النفيعي

Member of the Council of Representatives
- In office 2018–2022
- Monarch: Hamad bin Isa Al Khalifa
- Prime Minister: Khalifa bin Salman Al Khalifa, Salman bin Hamad Al Khalifa
- Succeeded by: Hamad Al-Doy
- Parliamentary group: Independent
- Constituency: Second District of the Muharraq Governorate

Personal details
- Born: Ibrahim Khalid Ibrahim Al-Nafei; 1985 (age 40–41)
- Occupation: social activist

Ibrahim Khalid Ibrahim Al-Nafei (Arabic: إبراهيم خالد إبراهيم النفيعي; born 1985) is a Bahraini politician, activist, and columnist. He was a member of the Council of Representatives for the Second District of the Muharraq Governorate between 2018 and 2022.

== Biography ==
Al-Nafei entered politics by running for the Second District of the Muharraq Governorate in the 2018 Bahraini general election. He won 1,458 votes for 23.89% in the first round on November 24, requiring a run-off on December 1, in which he defeated his opponent Ibrahim al-Hammadi by winning 2,932 votes for 53.28%.

He ran for the Second District of the Muharraq Governorate in the 2022 Bahraini general election. He won 1,455 votes for 32.46% in the first round on November 12, requiring a run-off on November 19, in which he lost to his opponent Hamad Al-Doy when he scored 1,908 votes for 47.01%.
