= Ammar Qambar =

Bahraini politician and businessman

- Occupations: Politician and businessman

Ammar Sami Ali Hasan Qambar (Arabic: عمار سامي علي حسن قمبر) is a Bahraini politician and businessman. He was sworn into the Council of Representatives on December 12, 2018, for the seventh district of Muharraq Governorate.

== Career ==
He owned and headed the international conference planning company WE EVENT.

He ran for the board of Al Hala SC, a leading Bahraini association football club, in 2013, becoming third reserve (substitute) member with 53 votes.

== House of Representatives ==
He entered politics when he ran for the Council of Representatives in the seventh district of Muharraq Governorate. He ran officially as an independent but was supported by the Al-Menber Islamic Society, the Bahraini branch of the Muslim Brotherhood. He was initially dropped from the voting rolls despite all his family members being listed, at least on the website contrary to automated phone messages he used to check. He called for the website to expedite inclusion of voter names. Fifteen promotional banners were stolen in front of his printing office on November 1, for which he filed a report, stating “we were going to put them up the next day, and while we do not know why this happened, we hope for a fair contest.” In the first round, held on November 24, 2018, Qambar won 3,593 votes for 31.45%. Thus, a second round was held, in which Qambar earned 7,317 votes (71.31%), defeating his rival Youssef Abdel Ghaffar to succeed his father Sami Ali Hasan Qambar, who had held office for Al-Menber since 2006 in the governorate's 5th district.
