= Khalifa Al Dhahrani =

Bahraini politician (born 1942)

Khalifa bin Ahmed Al Dhahrani
- خليفة بن أحمد الظهراني

Speaker of the Council of Representatives of Bahrain
- In office 14 December 2002 – 14 December 2014
- Monarch: Hamad bin Isa Al Khalifa
- Succeeded by: Ahmed Al Mulla

Personal details
- Born: 1942 (age 83–84)

Khalifa bin Ahmed Al Dhahrani (Arabic: خليفة بن أحمد الظهراني; born 1942) is a Bahraini politician, who served as Speaker of the Council of Representatives of Bahrain.

== Early life ==
Khalifa Al Dhahrani was born in the town of Riffa, in central Bahrain, in 1942. He graduated from Bahrain Petroleum Company's Institute of Training and Occupational Development. Prior to his political career, he was a prominent businessman in the Bahraini community.

== Political career ==
Al Dhahrani's political career began when he ran for and was elected as a member of Bahrain's first National Assembly in 1973. At age 31, he ran in the 20th constituency, at the time encompassing Riffa, Jaww, Askar and Zallaq. He served as MP until 1975, when the emir of Bahrain Isa bin Salman Al Khalifa dissolved parliament.

Al Dhahrani was later appointed to the Shura Council in 1992 and served there until 2002. He was one of the architects who drew up the National Action Charter of Bahrain in 2001, which led to the end of political unrest that plagued the country in the 1990s.

=== 2002 election ===
Al Dhahrani served in the Shura Council until 2002, when a royal decree dissolved the council. Al Dhahrani later planned to run for MP in the newly formed lower house of parliament. Al Dhahrani ran as a candidate in the ninth district of the Central Governorate and was elected to parliament, having secured a landslide victory, after winning 90% of the vote. Within the council, he was elected as Speaker of parliament.

=== 2006 election ===
Al Dhahrani was re-elected in the 2006 Bahraini general election, retaining his constituency. He was also re-elected as Speaker. Al Dhahrani retained his post after Islamist party Al Wefaq's leader Ali Salman indicated that he wanted to secure the post.

=== 2010 election ===
For the third time, Al Dhahrani was re-elected in the 2010 Bahraini general election in the same constituency and was also re-elected as Speaker for the third time.

== 2011 National Dialogue ==
In the aftermath of the 2011 unrest in Bahrain, the King of Bahrain, Hamad bin Isa Al Khalifa ordered the formation of a national dialogue, which was to be headed by Al Dhahrani.

== See also ==
- Khalifa Ahmed Al Bin Ali
- Politics of Bahrain
