= Arad, Bahrain =

Arad عراد
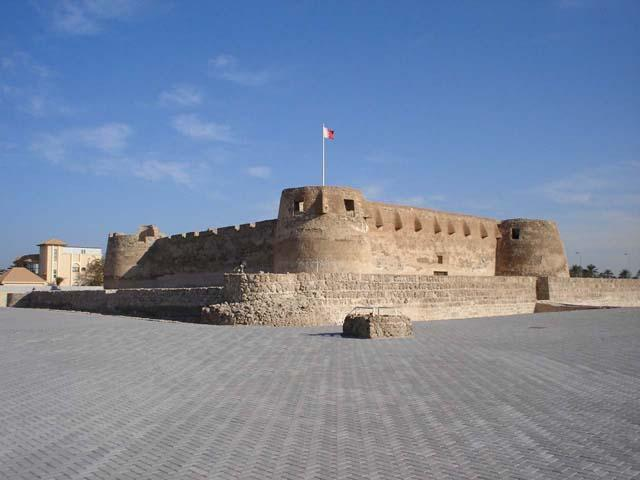
- View of Arad Fort

- Location in Bahrain
- Coordinates: 26°15′N 50°39′E
- Country: Bahrain
- Governorate: Muharraq Governorate

Arad (Arabic: عراد) is a town in Bahrain, located on Muharraq Island. It was originally a small farming village inhabited by Baharna Shia, but later expanded to include new middle-class housing, which brought with it a large Sunni population. As of 2023 there is a population of approximately 46,000.

== Geography ==
Arad lies east of Muharraq City and northwest of the town of Hidd. It was originally a separate island (called Arad Island) but land reclamation over the course of the 20th century joined Arad and Muharraq islands.

=== Arad Bay ===
The town is home to Arad Bay, a protected mangrove area and recreational park. Opened in 2010, the 10 million BHD park covers 3.3km of walkways and includes four bridges. The bay is home to wildlife including plankton, fish, seaweed, in addition to seasonal migratory birds such as greater flamingoes.

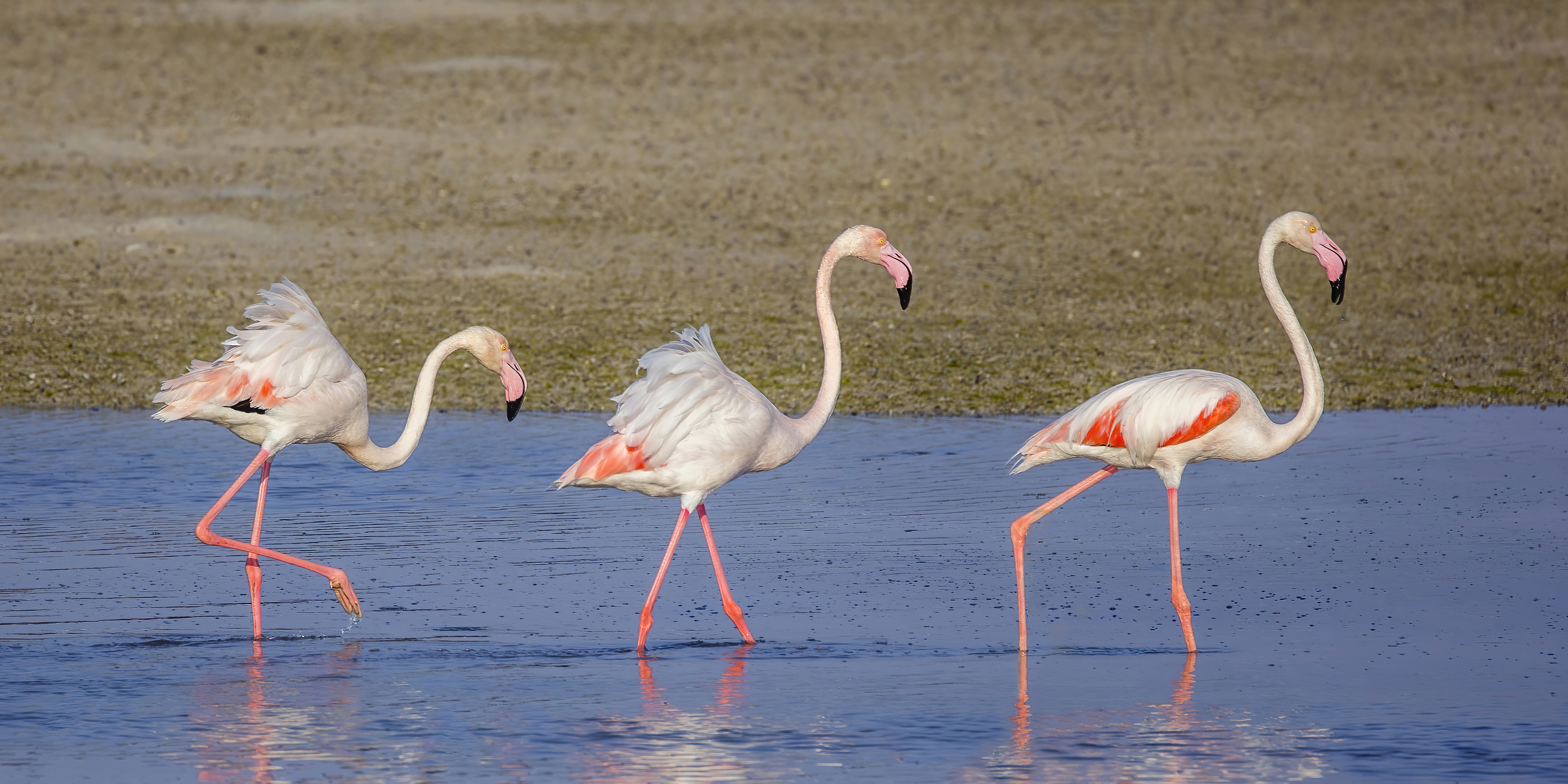
Greater flamingoes in Arad Bay, February 2022

== History ==
The name Arad comes from the Greek word Arados, the Greek name for Muharraq island alongside Tylos for the main Bahrain island. It was believed that Arados was originally a Phoenician settlement, as described by the Greek historian Strabo.

The Arad Fort, the Al Muharraq Stadium, and the headquarters of the Islamic Society (Bahrain) are located in the town. The site of Arad Fort is a 15th-century fortress that served as a military garrison during Portuguese occupation in the 1520s. Archaeological evidence suggests it was a significant settlement part of the Dilmun civilization.

=== Governance ===
The town is administered under the Muharraq Governorate.

== Education ==
The Bahraini Ministry of Education operates government schools nationwide. Within the Arad area, they operate boys schools include Al Kawarzmi Primary Boys School, Al-Dair Primary Boys School, Arad Primary Boys School, and Arad Primary Intermediate Boys School. Girls schools include Al Oroba Primary Girls School, Arad Intermediate Girls School, and Arad Primary Girls School.
