= Ali Ahmed Abdulla =

Bahraini politician

Ali Ahmed Abdulla is a member of Bahrain's parliament since 2002, representing the Al-Menbar Islamic Society, a Sunni party.
