= Fawzia Zainal =

Bahraini activist and politician (born 1961)

Her Excellency Fawzia Zainal
- فوزية زينل
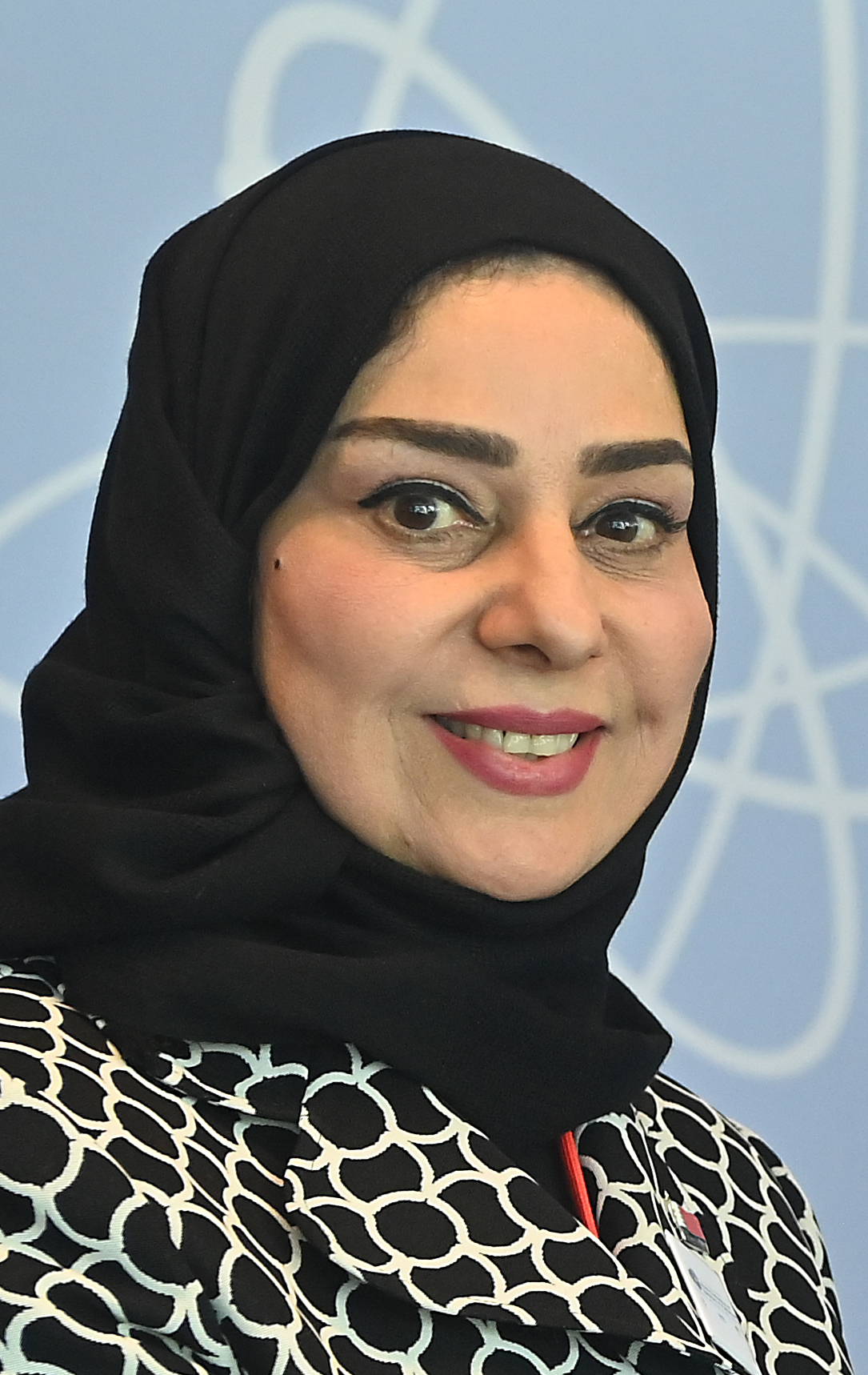
- Zainal in 2021

Speaker of the Council of Representatives of Bahrain
- In office 12 December 2018 – 12 December 2022
- Monarch: Hamad bin Isa Al Khalifa
- Preceded by: Ahmed Al Mulla
- Succeeded by: Ahmed bin Salman Al-Musallam

Personal details
- Born: 1961 (age 64–65)

Fawzia Abdulla Yusuf Zainal (Arabic: فوزية عبدالله يوسف زينل; born 1961) is a Bahraini media and social activist and politician who served as Speaker of the Council of Representatives from 12 December 2018 to 12 December 2022. Zainal became the first woman to lead Bahrain's parliament, and the second woman to lead a Gulf-Arab parliament after the UAE's Amal Al Qubaisi.

== Education ==
Zainal graduated with a degree in education and Arabic from the University of Bahrain in 1983 and has a Postgraduate Diploma in Counseling from the University of Jordan. She received a high diploma from the Bahrain Institution of Political Development in 2008 and a diploma from Bahrain University in 2014.

== Career ==
Zainal has worked as a journalist and is a media and social activist. She worked as a director in the Bahrain Radio and Television Corporation for twenty five years. She is a member of the Bahrain Businesswomen's Society. In 2009, she was a consultant for strategic planning and development at the Bahrain Ministry of Culture and Information.

Zainal first ran for parliament in 2006, despite threats against female candidates. Her campaign tent was set on fire and she was targeted by derogatory gossip. In 2014, she ran for the East Riffa fifth district, but fell short by 288 votes in a run-off election against her male opponent. Her campaign platform promised to focus on improving the living conditions of women, as well as addressing unemployment and fighting corruption.

Zainal was elected in December 2018 alongside five other women, winning her seat outright against the incumbent, Khalifa al-Ghanim, who had narrowly defeated her in 2014. She had criticised the previous parliament and promised to prioritise the needs of the less fortunate in her constituency. Bahrain does not have a quota for female representatives but while gender was seen as less of an issue in 2018, billboards of Zanial were torn up and defaced and other candidates reported receiving online threats. Zainal said, "My victory has broken the rule of male domination of this district and indicates that the people of the area have reached the conviction and maturity that make them not look at candidate’s gender, but at their capabilities and ability to take responsibility."

On 12 December 2018, Zainal was elected Speaker of the Council of Representatives with 25 of the 40 votes and then appointed by King Hamad bin Isa Al Khalifa. He said, "The election of the first woman speaker of the Council of Representatives represents a quantum leap forward and source of pride for the Kingdom of Bahrain which has spared no effort to empower women."

== Personal life ==
Zainal is a Sunni Muslim. She has one married son.
