= ISOC =

ISOC is an abbreviation which may refer to:

- Information Security Operations Center, is a location where enterprise information systems are monitored, assessed, and defended.
- Internet Society, ISOC, an international organization that promotes Internet use and access
- Internal Security Operations Command, a unit of the Thai military devoted to national security issues
- Islamic Society, various Islamic-based groups
- Independent State of Croatia, a country that existed during WWII
