= Mohammed Al-Buainain =

Bahraini politician, engineer

- محمد البوعينين
- Incumbent
- Assumed office 2018
- Monarch: Hamad bin Isa Al Khalifa
- Prime Minister: Khalifa bin Salman Al Khalifa, Salman, Crown Prince of Bahrain
- Parliamentary group: independent

Personal details
- Born: Mohammed Ibrahim Ali Muhanna Al-Sisi Al-Buainain
- Occupation: engineer

Mohammed Al-Buainain (Arabic: محمد البوعينين) is a Bahraini politician, engineer, and pilot. He was sworn into the Council of Representatives on December 12, 2018 for the eighth district in the Southern Governorate.

== Education ==
He obtained a degree in aviation sciences from Khalifa bin Zayed Air College in the United Arab Emirates in 1986, then earned a degree in Structural Engineering from the University of Bahrain in 1992, a Bachelor of Science in Civil Engineering from the same school in 1998, and a Master of Science in Engineering Project Management in the United Kingdom in 2000.

== Career ==
He worked as a civil engineer in the southern municipalities and went on to work for the government of the Southern Governorate.

== House of Representatives ==
In 2018, he decided to run for the eighth district in the Southern Governorate, winning 3,984 votes (63.28%) in the first round.
