= Islamic society =

Islamic society may refer to:

- A society in which Islamic culture is dominant
- The Islamic world
- Mosque, or Islamic Center – the place of Muslim prayer
- Category:Mosques
- Category:Islamic organizations of various types
- Islamic Society of North America – one of the largest American Muslim organizations.
- Islamic Society (Bahrain) – a Sunni Islamic organization in Bahrain
- Islamic Society – a group within an institution (school, college, university) providing services for Muslims
- Islamic Society, Jamaat-e-Islami – a political party in Pakistan
- Islamic Society, Jamiat-e Islami – a political party in Afghanistan
- Al-Gama'a al-Islamiyya was/is an umbrella organization for Egyptian militant student groups, formed in the 1970s
