= Jawad Fairooz =

Jawad Fairooz جواد فيروز

Member of the Council of Representatives (Bahrain)
- In office 2 December 2006 – February 2011

Chairman of the Public Utilities & Environment Committee
- In office 12 January 2007 – February 2011

Personal details
- Born: Jawad Fairooz
- Party: Al Wefaq
- Education: Bachelor of Science from University of Texas in 1986
- Occupation: Politician

Jawad Fairooz (Arabic: جواد فيروز غلوم فيروز) is a human rights defender and former Bahraini Member of the Council of Representatives (Bahrain), rendered stateless in 2011. Whilst in exile in the United Kingdom, Fairooz became the chairman of Salam for Democracy and Human Rights (Salam DHR). He founded Salam for Democracy and Human Rights in 2015.

== Work as a member of parliament ==
Fairooz was first elected as a member of parliament for the Northern Governorate in the 2006 Bahraini general election, and re-elected in 2010, as a member of the Al Wefaq political party. During his time as an MP, Fairooz was chairman of the Public Utilities & Environmental Committee.

He served as a member of parliament until the withdrawal of the Al Wefaq parliamentary bloc in 2011.

== Statelessness and Exile in the UK ==
Following the 2011 Bahraini uprising and the withdrawal of the Al Wefaq parliamentary bloc in 2011, Fairooz was detained on 2 May alongside Matar Matar. On 6 November 2012, whilst in the United Kingdom, Fairooz was stripped of his nationality and rendered stateless, alongside 30 other Bahraini nationals, deemed to have caused "damage to state security".

In 2011, Fairooz became Chairman of Salam for Democracy and Human Rights (Salam DHR), an NGO formed following the Bahraini uprising. Salam DHR works to influence governmental representatives, to increase awareness of human rights and democracy issues in the Middle East, and works with human rights defenders such as Ebtisam al Saegh.
