= Islamic Education Society =

Islamic organization based in Bahrain

- جمعية التربية الإسلامية
- Formation: 1978
- Type: Religious organization
- Location: Bahrain
- Affiliations: Sunni Islam

The Islamic Education Society (Arabic: جمعية التربية الإسلامية) is an Islamic organization in Bahrain that follows and promotes the conservative Salafist ideology. It participates in politics through its political wing, Asalah.

It runs a number of charities and welfare projects, in addition to its Islamic proselytization activities.

Established 1978, it owns and operates Al-Iman School, with annual revenue of over BD 1m.

The Malayalam language wing of the society was named the Al Furqan Centre. This centre was founded and registered as “Markaz Al Furqan Li Tahfeezil Quran” and carried out its activities in the field of Dawah and Quranic teaching, under the supervision of Islamic Education Society. In 2010 it was re-introduced and registered under the Ministry of Justice and Islamic Affairs, Directorate of Religious Affairs, Department of Research and Information as “Al Furqan Centre for Expatriate Communities".

== See also ==
- Islam in Bahrain
