= Isa bin Mohammed Al Khalifa =

Isa bin Mohammed al Khalifa
- عيسى بن محمد آل خليفة
- Born: November 25, 1938; Muharraq, Bahrain
- Died: August 13, 2015 (aged 76)
- Education: Cairo University
- Occupation: civil servant
- Children: 3
- Relatives: Hamad bin Isa Al Khalifa (nephew)
- Family: House of Al Khalifa

Isa bin Muhammad Al Khalifa (Arabic: عيسى بن محمد آل خليفة; November 25, 1938 – August 13, 2015) was a Bahraini lawyer, judge, and minister. An uncle of King Hamad bin Isa Al Khalifa, Isa bin Muhammad directed the Al-Menber Islamic Society, the Bahraini branch of the Muslim Brotherhood, from 1963 until his death.

== Career ==
Born in Muharraq, Al Khalifa graduated from Al-Hidaya Al-Khalifia Boys School in 1950, then obtained his high school diploma from Helwan Technical Vocational Secondary School in 1956. He earned a Bachelor of Arts in Law from Cairo University in 1962.

He was Minister of Justice and Islamic Affairs from 1974 to 1975, and Minister of Labor from 1975 to 1980.

== Death ==
Al Khalifa died after returning from medical treatment abroad on August 13, 2015, at the age of 77, and was buried on August 15, 2015, in Hunainiyah Cemetery in Riffa, Bahrain.
