= Civil Aviation Affairs =

The Civil Aviation Affairs (Arabic: شئون الطيران المدني) is the civil aviation authority of the Kingdom of Bahrain, headquartered in Building 702 in Hidd on Muharraq island.

As a subsidiary of the Ministry of Transportation and Telecommunications, it is responsible for all air transportation-related activities within the country. These responsibilities include issuing licenses, permits, airline schedules. Additionally, the CAA is responsible for providing Bahrain with meteorological services such as weather forecasts.

== Directorates ==
There are seven directorates that make up the CAA, as of October 2019:

- Aeronautical Licensing
- Air Navigation Systems
- Air Traffic Management
- Air Transport
- Aviation Security
- Aviation Safety and Security
- Meteorology

== See also ==
- Bahrain International Airport
- Bahrain Airport Company
- Gulf Air
- Gulf Air Flight 72
- Bahrain Air
