= Ahmed bin Salman Al-Musallam =

Bahraini politician (born 1961)

His Excellency Ahmed bin Salman Al-Musallam
- أحمد سلمان جبر المسلم

Speaker of the Council of Representatives of Bahrain
- Incumbent
- Assumed office 12 December 2022
- Monarch: Hamad bin Isa Al Khalifa
- Preceded by: Fawzia Zainal

Personal details
- Born: July 27, 1961 (age 65)

Ahmed bin Salman Jabr Al-Musallam (Arabic: أحمد سلمان جبر المسلم; born 27 July 1961) is a Bahraini businessman, politician and former military officer who has served since December 2022 as the Speaker of the Council of Representatives of Bahrain (the lower house of the Bahraini national legislative body).

== Biography ==
Al-Musallam was born on 27 July 1961. He is from Muharraq Governorate, Bahrain. He comes from a prominent family, with his father, Salman bin Jabr Al-Musallam, having been a high-ranking officer in the Ministry of Interior, while his brother, Khalid, served as the Bahraini ambassador to Morocco. He attended King Fahd Security College in Riyadh, Saudi Arabia, and graduated in 1981. He holds a bachelor's degree in security services.

After his education, Al-Musallam entered business, working in legal and security fields for multiple investment, real estate and environmental companies. He was an officer for the Bahrain Ministry of Interior, where he worked for the General Traffic Department and the Training and Operations Department. He was also an executive for the Hidd SCC football club, where he served as the president and chairman of the board of directors. He resigned his positions there in October 2022, as he entered politics.

Al-Musallam entered politics by running for the Council of Representatives as part of the 2022 Bahraini general election, vying for the seat from the Muharraq Governorate eighth constituency, which includes the city of Al Hidd. He ultimately won the election in November. In December, although he had only just begun his term in office, he was elected the Speaker of the Council of Representatives of Bahrain, receiving 34 votes, compared to six received by his opponent, Mohammed Al-Maarifi.
