= Matar Matar =

Bahraini politician

- Born: 3 May 1976 (age 50); Bahrain
- Education: Master's degree in Computer Science (Artificial Intelligence) from Kuwait University
- Occupation: Politician
- Years active: (2002–present)
- Organization: Al Wefaq
- Spouse: Amal Habib
- Children: Ahmed (born 2007); Sarah (born 2008)
- Awards: Leaders of Democracy Award (Project on Middle East Democracy)
- Website: Twitter

Matar Ebrahim Ali Matar (also spelled Mattar Mattar; Arabic: مطر إبراهيم علي مطر; born 3 May 1976) is a Bahraini politician of the Al Wefaq party who served as a Member of Parliament (MP) from October 2010 until his resignation in early 2011. Born in the village of Al Daih to a large family with diverse political views, Matar completed his secondary education in Bahrain and moved to Kuwait to pursue higher education. He remained there until 2002 when he returned to Bahrain and joined Al Wefaq political party. Matar was politically active, working within committees in the party and meeting with foreign officials. In 2010, he won with a large margin in the Parliamentary election, becoming the youngest of all MPs and representing the country's largest constituency.

When the Bahraini uprising started in early 2011, Matar joined the protests and gave several interviews to international media. Following government crackdown, he and other party MPs resigned from Parliament. Due to his activism, Matar was arrested by authorities in May. He was allegedly kept in solitary confinement and subjected to torture while in detention before getting tried before a military court. He was released in August and acquitted of charges in February 2012. His arrest, alleged mistreatment and subsequent release triggered several international reactions by international bodies and NGOs such as the Office of the United Nations High Commissioner for Human Rights, Inter-Parliamentary Union, Amnesty International and Human Rights Watch. Following his release, Matar continued his political activism.

== Early life and career ==
Matar was born in Al Daih village, Bahrain on 3 May 1976. His father, Ebrahim is married to three women and has 17 children besides Matar, who is the fifth child out of his mother's seven. The family is diverse in its ideological and political views; some being "leftists, Islamists, Communists, some...conservative and some liberal," said a family member. They are active politicians, most of them members of opposition groups Al Wefaq (Shia) or Wa'ad (secular). As a child, Matar is said to have been shy and intelligent. He studied at Al Razi primary school, then at Jidhafs intermediate school and after that at Noaim secondary school, where he is said to have been a top student.

He traveled to Kuwait to pursue higher education. He earned a Master's degree in Computer Science (Artificial Intelligence) from Kuwait University. When the 1990s uprising in Bahrain began in 1994, Matar left to Kuwait. He returned to Bahrain following a reform process initiated by King Hamad who succeeded his father, Isa bin Salman Al Khalifa. In 2003, Matar married Amal Habib, an ophthalmologist working in Salmaniya Medical Complex. They have a son, Ahmed (born 2007) and a daughter, Sarah (born 2008).

== Political life ==
Matar joined Al Wefaq political party in 2002 following his return to Bahrain. He established its Youth Center and became its head. He was also a member of the party's monitoring committee and anti-discrimination committee to which he co-authored a report about discrimination in Bahrain. According to his colleague Khalil al-Marzooq, Matar was active and popular within Al Wefaq. In 2008, he participated in the Leaders for Democracy Fellowship Program in the United States, during which he met Condoleezza Rice, the then-Secretary of State and criticized the U.S. for giving Bahrain "a pass in exchange for hosting the U.S. Navy’s 5th Fleet's large base." Since 2009, Matar had been working with the Project on Middle East Democracy (POMED).

In October 2010, Matar was successfully nominated by Al Wefaq to the parliamentary election, becoming the youngest Member of Parliament. The constituency he represented, the first of the Northern Governorate is the biggest in Bahrain, having about 16,000 people. In the previous election of 2006, Ali Salman, the head of Al Wefaq who did not run in this election, was elected by the same constitute. Matar won from the first round with a percentage of 85.72.

He became a member of the financial affairs committee where he was an outspoken critic of the military budget. In December, the then-U.S. Secretary of State Hillary Clinton was on a visit to Bahrain when Matar asked her to "use America’s influence to reverse a sharp decline in civil rights in the kingdom". "Sometime we feel that there are no red lines or constraints between United States and their allies," he added. Since then, he has become a well-known politician and a "moderate critic of the Sunni-led Bahraini government". In their 2011 documentary, Bahrain: Shouting in the Dark, Al Jazeera English (AJE) described Matar as "the closest thing Bahrain had to a representative leader".

== Bahraini uprising ==
=== Background ===
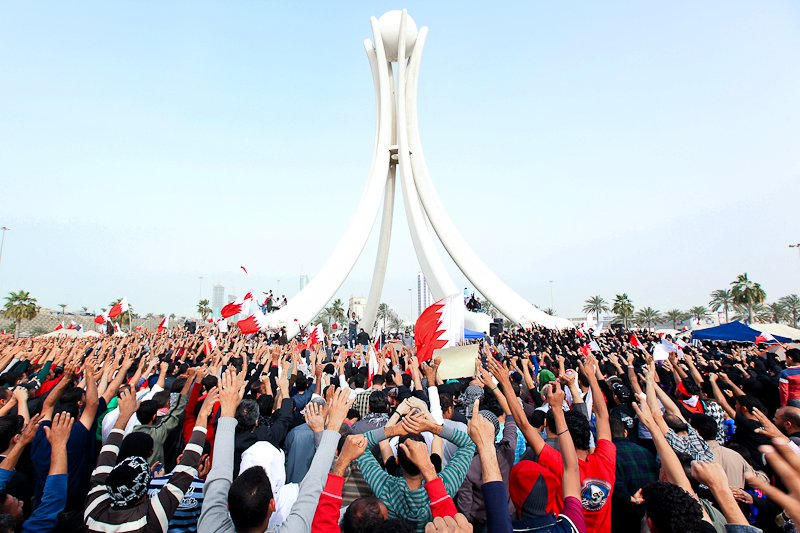
Protests at Pearl Roundabout in February 2011

Beginning in February 2011, Bahrain saw sustained pro-democracy protests, centered at the Pearl Roundabout in the capital of Manama, as part of the wider Arab Spring. Authorities responded with a night raid on 17 February (later referred to by protesters as Bloody Thursday), which left four protesters dead and more than 300 injured. In March, martial law was declared and Saudi troops were called in. Despite the hard crackdown and official ban, the protests continued.

=== Role in uprising ===
Matar was among protesters in the Pearl Roundabout; he also took part in a number of other protests and encouraged youth to do so. In February, he and 17 other Al Wefaq MPs (the largest bloc) submitted their resignations in protest against the government crackdown on anti-government demonstrations. He was involved in organizing talks with the government. Matar was outspoken against the government's human rights violations, giving interviews to human rights organisations and foreign media including one on 26 April with AJE on the arrest of several health workers and another on 1 May with BBC in which he called for "establishment of a secular democracy in Bahrain". He also gave interviews to Reuters and France 24.

On 28 April, a TV programme with footage of a defendant charged with "murdering two security officers" was aired on the state-controlled Bahrain TV. The programme was one of a series of confessions from prisoners aired by the channel. The defendant, called Ali Saqer said Matar had instructed him to kill policemen. Saqer had died from torture earlier in April while in detention (the footage was aired more than two weeks after Saqer's death). Following the airing of the programme, Matar said he was worried that "they [the government] are preparing something for me". Due to his actions during the uprising, Matar became a "government target".

=== Arrest and alleged mistreatment ===
On 2 May, following a car chase, Matar was arrested by plain-clothed and masked security forces while he was accompanied by his wife, his family said. AJE reported that Matar was forced at gunpoint to enter an unmarked car. His wife Amal said in an interview with AJE: "We were chased in the street by masked men in plain clothes with machine guns. They cornered us in the street and take [sic] him out of the car in front of my eyes with the guns pointed at his head."

Subsequently, Matar was taken to an unknown location. According to "media sources and human rights organizations", he was kept in solitary confinement until 12 June, with a family visit allowed ten days later. During the visit, Matar said he had not been mistreated, but a human rights activist, Nabeel Rajab said he was beaten afterwards. A witness said he had overheard the screams and beatings of Matar on 10 May while he was being held for interrogation at a military barrack in Riffa. The witness added that he had heard guards call Matar's name and saw him "handcuffed and with blood on his clothes". Following his release, Matar said he had been subjected to torture and filed a complaint regarding it. In a testimony to Amnesty International, he said:

I was ill-treated by the security forces in Bahrain and held in solitary confinement for 45 days. I was interrogated by the Criminal Investigation Department while blindfolded and handcuffed and threatened to be treated like an animal if I did not co-operate. For several days I was deprived of sleep and forced to stand up for prolonged hours. I was brought before the military prosecutor without the presence of a lawyer and only allowed to contact the outside world for the first time three weeks after my arrest, but I wasn't allowed to tell them where I was being held.

The government of Bahrain denied that Matar had been kept in solitary confinement. They said the "information concerning the disappearance of Mr. Matar following his arrest is not correct" and that they had followed international human rights standards. They added that Matar was allowed to contact his family and lawyer, and that his "legal safeguards were ensured" according to local law. They also noted that Matar had lost his parliamentary immunity following the acceptance of his resignation on 29 March. They however did not address the allegations of mistreatment nor did they provide other information requested by the Office of the United Nations High Commissioner for Human Rights such as the results of investigation and medical examinations. Also, Kassoum Tapo, the president of the Committee on human rights of parliamentarians of the Inter-Parliamentary Union insisted that Matar had been a parliamentarian "at the time of the demonstrations and of [his] arrest."

=== Trial ===
On 12 June, Matar was put before a military court called the National Safety Court. He and Jawad Fairooz, another resigned MP of Al Wefaq who was also detained on 2 May were charged with "public incitement for regime change and deliberately spreading biased rumors, in addition to taking part in public gatherings," the state-run Bahrain News Agency reported. Matar denied charges against him. His second session before court was on 21 June, but he was not brought to court. Against the wishes of his lawyer, the judge refused to adjourn Matar's trial saying it was a minor case that did not warrant his attendance. The third session was due on 5 July. Matar and Fairooz were released on 7 August, however their cases remained open. On 20 February 2012, Matar was acquitted of all charges by the minor criminal court. Later in the month, his travel ban was lifted and he was allowed to travel to Washington, D.C. for POMED annual awards reception.

=== Reactions ===
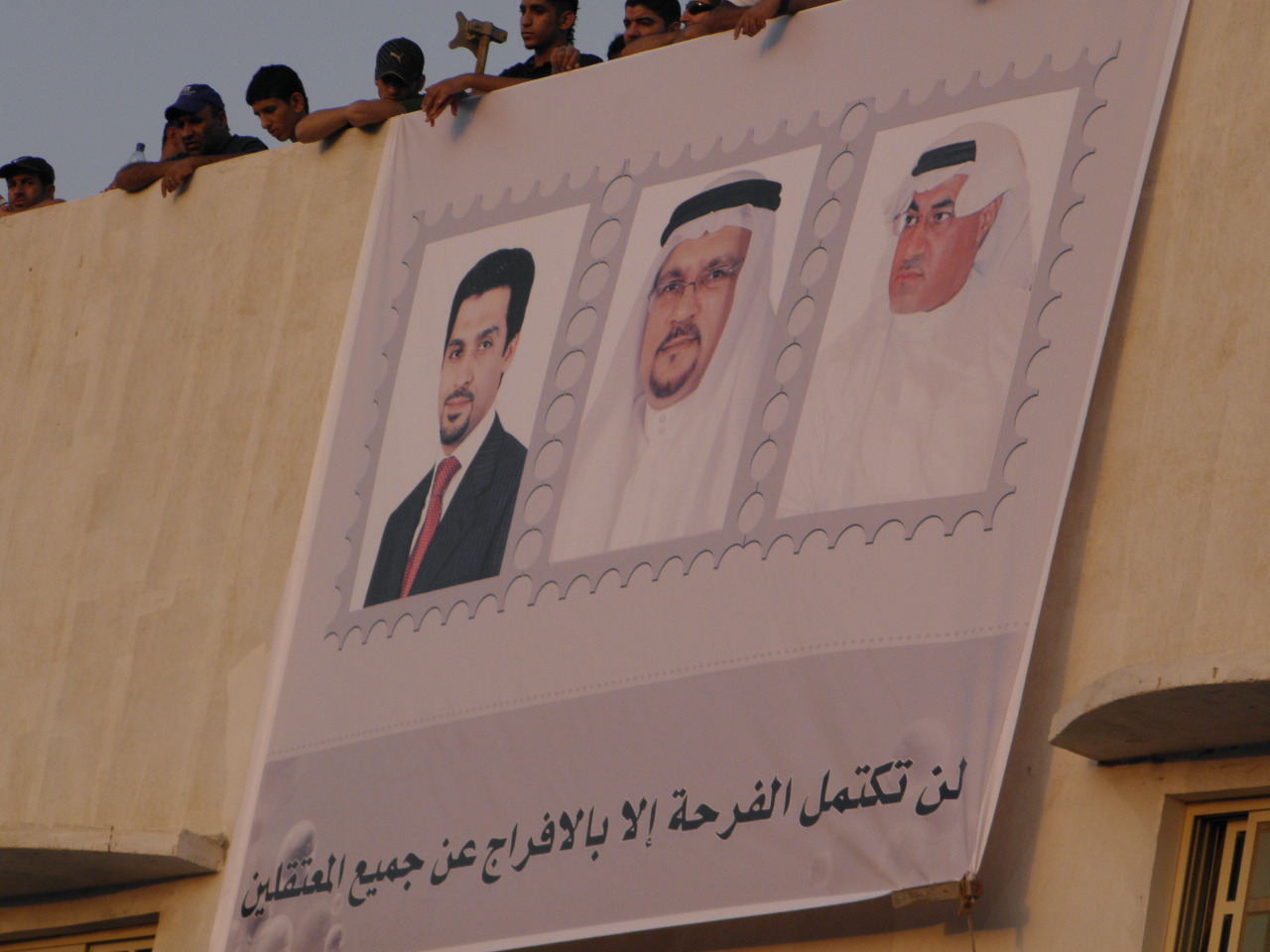
A banner calling for release of Matar (left) and Jawad Fairooz (middle)

Matar said he thought the purpose of the arrest was to pressure Al Wefaq. Analysts speculated that the release was "an attempt at defusing tensions in the country". The Office of the United Nations High Commissioner for Human Rights expressed concern over the alleged mistreatment of Matar, alleged absence of access to lawyer and guarantees for a fair trial. The Inter-Parliamentary Union expressed concern that by October 2012, authorities had not started prosecuting those behind the alleged mistreatment of Matar and Fairooz.

Amnesty International expressed its concern on the arrest of Matar and Fairooz and asked authorities to protect them from ill-treatment. The UK-based NGO welcomed their release saying it was overdue. Human Rights Watch (HRW) expressed its concern on the two former MPs. "These latest arrests of the two Al Wefaq parliamentarians fit a pattern of masked men abducting Bahraini citizens who happen to have opinions critical of the government," said Joe Stork of HRW. Alkarama expressed concern over the arrest and possible mistreatment of the two, and welcomed Matar's acquittal later. American scholars John Farmer, Jr. and Michael Bronner wrote an opinion piece in The Washington Post asking the United States to push for the release of Matar.

=== Continued activism ===
Following his release, Matar continued his pro-democracy activities, authoring a number of book chapters and articles on the situation in Bahrain and testifying before a United States Congress human rights commission. In 2012, the Project on Middle East Democracy awarded him with the Leaders of Democracy Award. In 2013 he co-authored an article titled "Bahrain's Shifting Sands" for the Carnegie Endowment for International Peace and was a presenter at a National Endowment for Democracy event titled "Understanding the Struggle for Power and the Democratization Process in Bahrain".
