= 2022 Bahraini general election =

- 12 November 2022 (first round); 19 November 2022 (second round)
- All 40 seats in the Council of Representatives
Speaker before	Speaker after
Fawzia Zainal	Ahmed bin Salman Al-Musallam

General elections were held in Bahrain on 12 November 2022 to elect the 40 members of the Council of Representatives, with a second round in some constituencies on 19 November.

The elections were condemned domestically and internationally as a sham. Rights groups condemned the atmosphere of "political repression". The Bahrain Institute for Rights and Democracy, based in London, called it a "sham", and Amnesty International stated that the elections were "held in an environment of political repression following a decade in which the authorities have infringed upon human rights, curtailed civil society, banned political opposition parties and shuttered independent media". They issued a report on the elections, "Bahrain: Elections, But No Civic Space" in which they stated that Bahrain's political system did not, in practice, allow citizens to peacefully and legally seek constitutional change.

Domestically, there were advance calls for a boycott of the elections, as in 2018. On election day hackers took down government websites, including the elections, parliamentary and state-news websites. A group calling itself "al-Touafan" ("the Flood") claimed responsibility for at least some of the attacks, saying they were "due to the persecution carried out by the Bahraini authorities, and in implementation of the popular will to boycott the sham elections".

== Electoral system ==
The 40 members of the Council of Representatives are elected from single-member constituencies using the two-round system; if no candidate receives a majority of the vote in the first round, a second round is held.

Under the 2002 constitution, the council is the lower house of parliament, which examines and passes legislation proposed by the king and the king's appointed cabinet; the upper chamber, the Consultative Council, is appointed by the king and can block legislation passed by the lower house.

Only Bahraini citizens are entitled to contest and vote in the elections. Many political dissidents active in previous elections were stripped of their Bahraini citizenship. Citizens could also be disqualified from voting if they had been members of opposition parties and groups that the government had banned, if they had previously resigned from parliament, or if they had been sentenced to more than six months in prison. Many had been sentenced to terms more than six months for non-violent participation in the 2011 protests (the government estimates that over 300 protestors had been sentence to more than one year). Voters who had not voted in previous elections were not included on the voter lists, but were eligible to register. These rules disenfranchised 21.5% of Bahraini citizens, a higher proportion than in the 2018 elections; in 2022 344,713 voters were eligible, down from 365,467 in 2018.

However, the electorate was less than a quarter of the population of 1.5 million, as most residents do not have citizenship.

== Candidates ==
A total of 330 candidates contested the elections, of which 73 were women, an increase from 293 candidates in 2018. Former members of Wa'ad, al-Wefaq, and Amal, formerly-legal opposition parties, were banned from standing for election, and from taking leadership positions in civil society organisations. This rule was estimated to affect 6,000-11,000 citizens according to Human Rights Watch.

== Conduct ==
The government banned all false or confusing statements that could affect the election, and all unlicensed public gatherings, and demonstrations, with sentences of two years for violations. This included any "gathering in a public place, composed of at least five people, with the goal of... infringing on public order, even to achieve a legitimate purpose".

Two months before the election, the government introduced new legislation that banned electoral activity that "infringes on public security or public morals or religious beliefs or the customs prevalent in society", or "infringing on the Islamic creed or the unity of the people, or that incites division or sectarianism between citizens". Bahrainis were also forbidden from "organizing and holding meetings and giving election speeches" in "houses of worship", "public places reserved for public services", any educational institution, and at "statues... and historic buildings". Amnesty International stated "These highly restrictive measures quash much of the scope for the exercise of the human rights to freedom of expression, peaceful assembly, association, and public participation" in the election.

No media critical of the government had been permitted in Bahrain since the government shut down the newspaper al-Wasat in June 2017.

A demonstration calling for a boycott of the election was held in the town of Sanabis on 18 October. Protests against the election were also held during a visit by Pope Francis less than a week before the election.

Hackers took down election-related government websites on election day. A group calling itself "al-Touafan" ("the Flood") claimed responsibility for at least some of the attacks, saying they were "due to the persecution carried out by the Bahraini authorities, and in implementation of the popular will to boycott the sham elections".

Citing the non-democratic nature of the election, the US was urged to pivot away from its close relationship with Bahrain by the Baharani-American human rights group Americans for Democracy & Human Rights in Bahrain (ADHRB)

On election day, a government spokesman, responding to criticisms of the process, described Bahrain as a "vibrant democracy".

== Results ==
Six candidates, one of them female, were announced to have won seats in the first round; the remaining seats had to be contested in second-round runoff votes. The government reported that turnout among eligible voters was 73%, up from 67% in the 2018 election.

== See also ==
- List of political parties in Bahrain
- Human rights in Bahrain
- 2011 Bahrain protests
- Constitution of Bahrain
