= Adel Mouwda =

Bahraini politician

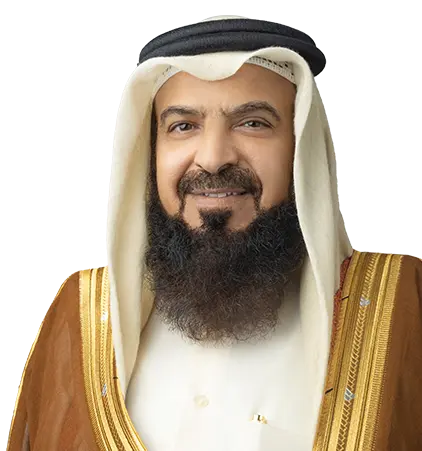
Dr. Adel AlMaawda

Sheikh Adel Al Mouwda was the second deputy chairman of Bahrain's parliament of 2002, the Chamber of Deputies, and the former leader of salafist party, Asalah. Sheikh Al Mouwda is considered the leading spokesman for political Islam in Bahrain and is known for his views, which has seen him often quoted in the international press.

In March 2011, Mouwda was expelled from the Asalah bloc for boycotting an extraordinary meeting of parliament voting on Al Wefaq's en-masse resignation.

== Political positions ==
Sheikh AlMouwda's political identity aligns more closely with religious conservatism, as a Salafist Politician and graduate of Islamic Studies and is prominent for his support of national interests, through a religious framework. One of these notable occurrences, was his vocal opposition to Iranian influence in Bahrain during the 2011 Bahraini Uprising and his full support of the Bahraini Monarchy. His views reflected the wider Salafist and Gulf Arab narrative that sees Iran as a geopolitical and ideological threat.

Sheikh Al Mouwda has been at the forefront of criticism of government plans to build a new national museum to showcase the ancient Dilmun Burial Mounds, telling MPs that the money should be used to construct housing over the extensive mounds, saying "We must have pride in our Islamic roots and not some ancient civilisation from another place and time, which has only given us a jar here and a bone there. "

Along with Al-Menbar Islamic Society's Sheikh Mohammed Khalid, Sheikh Al Mouwda has clashed repeatedly with government ministers in parliament over alcohol sales and claimed credit for enforcing a ban on alcohol in five star hotels over Ramadan 2006. He has vowed to "Clean Bahrain's tourism sector from its alleged dependence on this poison."

Although he has sought to reach out to Shia leaders in Bahrain, Sheikh Al Mouwda has been critical of Iranian influence in the region, telling The New York Times: "If Iran acted like an Islamic power, just Islam without Shiism, then Arabs would accept it as a regional Islamic power. But if it came to us with the Shia agenda as a Shiite power, then it will not succeed and it will be powerful, but despised and hated."

Like other Bahraini Islamist leaders such as Ali Salman, Sheikh Al Mouwda formerly lived in London. The radicalization of his political views is said to have occurred whilst studying at the University of North London (now London Metropolitan University).
