= Al Asalah =

Sunni Salafist political party in Bahrain

Al-Asalah Islamic Society جمعية الأصالة الإسلامية
- Leader: Ghanim Al-Buaneen
- Founded: 5 June 2002
- Ideology: Salafi Islamism
- Religion: Sunni Islam
- National affiliation: Islamic Education Society
- Council of Representatives: 0 / 40
- Shura Council: 0 / 40

Website
- www.alasalah-bh.org

The Al-Asalah Islamic Society (Arabic: جمعية الأصالة الإسلامية) is the main Sunni Salafist political party in Bahrain. The party is the political wing of the Islamic Education Society (Al-Tarbiya Al-Islamiya) which funds the party. Asalah's leader is Ghanim Al Buaneen, who took over in 2005 from Adel Mouwda, who was sacked because he was perceived to be too close to Shia Islamists in the Al-Wefaq party. Asalah is most popular in the conservative bastions of Muharraq and Riffa. Asalah often aligns with Al-Menbar to outvote Al-Wefaq.

== Ideology ==
Asalah seeks to promote a hardline interpretation of Islam which rejects much of Bahrain's modernism as well as encouraging religious observance. It has led opposition to US military action in Iraq and was at the forefront of demonstrations against military action in Falluja.

On the issue of women's political rights, Buaneen told the Bahrain Tribune on 18 January 2006 that the party disagrees with them having any. Buaneen said that this position reflects the party's "honesty" while other parties support women's participation only in their statements. Buaneen said: "If women make it to parliament, then we would cooperate with them, but our society wouldn’t support any woman candidates".

The party's ideology has seen it at the forefront of debate on the Bahrain's national heritage, arguing, especially during Adel Mouwda's leadership, that the country should consider the destruction of all sites that pre-date Islam. During a parliamentary debate on 17 July 2005, Asalah deputies clashed with other MPs over government plans to build a national museum to showcase the Dilmun burial mounds. Adel Mouwda told MPs that the money should be invested in building houses over the burial mounds. "Housing for the living is better than the graves for the dead. We must have pride in our Islamic roots and not some ancient civilisation from another place and time, which has only given us a jar here and a bone there."

Adel Al-Mouwda's approach to the preservation of Bahrain's historic sites differs markedly with that of his successor, Ghanim Al Buaneen, who in March 2006 criticized the government for not doing enough to protect the dilapidated, but historic centre of Muharraq and demanding more government money for restoration work. The less ideological approach of Buaneen towards the preservation of the Kingdom's history is a reflection of a more conciliatory attitude on his part towards modernity in general.

The party has been actively campaigning against witchcraft and has sought to introduce legislation to make the practice of sorcery and fortune telling illegal with a two-year prison sentence or BD500 fine for offenders. MP Ali Mattar, who has taken a lead, told the English language Gulf Daily News: "It's becoming more popular for people coming to Bahrain to turn to fortune tellers and sorcerers to find out what their future holds or to act as mediums to harm others or make people fall in love with them. There are many homes around the country with foreign deviants that are known to be practising black magic and if you drive past them a large number of cars from around the GCC would be found parked outside." However, the move has been resisted by these sorcerers who described the plan as 'unfair', with a fortune teller responding: "I can understand the MPs' feelings because there are fraudsters out there, but it's not fair for those who truly have the gift of seeing the future and dealing with the supernatural".

The relationship with Bahrain's Shi'a Islamists, such as Al Wefaq, is ambiguous. Asalah's Salafist ideology precludes full cooperation between the two parties. However, both types of fundamentalists are opponents of what they consider moral laxity and are ready to campaign together on "morality issues". The party's relationship with the Muslim Brotherhood's political wing, Al-Menbar Islamic Society, is one of competitors for Sunni Islamist voters, but, as with Al Wefaq, they are willing to informally work together to pursue particular objectives.

The party has a bad relationship with MP Jassim Al Saeedi who was rejected as a member for being 'too extreme'.

== Electoral history ==
The group won seven seats in the Bahraini Council of Representatives (parliament) at the 2002 election, four seats at the 2006 election (when three Sunni independents generally voted with Asala), three seats at the 2010 election and two seat at the 2014 election. It won three seats at the 2018 election.

=== Council of Representatives elections ===
Election	Party leader	Votes	%	Seats	+/–	Position
2002	Adel Mouwda			7 / 40	▲2	▲2nd
2006	Ghanim Al Buaneen			5 / 40	▼2	▼3rd
2010	Ghanim Al Buaneen	5,277		3 / 40	▼2	▲2nd
2014	Ghanim Al Buaneen			2 / 40	▼1	▲1st
2018	Ghanim Al Buaneen			3 / 40	▲1	1st

== See also ==
- List of Islamic political parties
- List of political parties in Bahrain
