= List of speakers of the Council of Representatives of Bahrain =

List of speakers of the Council of Representatives of Bahrain.

This is a list of speakers of the Council of Representatives of Bahrain.

From 1973 to 1975, Bahrain had a unicameral legislature, Constitutional Parliament, which was dissolved in 1975. The Speaker of the council was Ebrahim Al-Arrayedh.

Name	Entered office	Left office	Notes
Khalifa Al Dhahrani	14 December 2002	14 December 2014	
Ahmed Bin Ibrahim Al-Mulla	14 December 2014	12 December 2018	
Fawzia Zainal	12 December 2018	12 December 2022	
Ahmed bin Salman Al-Musallam	12 December 2022	Incumbent	
