= Bahrain Air =

Bahraini airline (2008) - (2013)

Bahrain Airways
| IATA | ICAO | Call sign |
|---|---|---|
| BN | BAB | BAHRAIN AIR |
- Founded: 2007
- Commenced operations: 1 February 2008
- Ceased operations: 12 February 2013
- Operating bases: Bahrain International Airport
- Hubs: Bahrain International Airport
- Frequent-flyer program: Loyalty Rewards Program
- Fleet size: 4
- Destinations: 17
- Headquarters: Muharraq, Bahrain
- Key people: Shaikh Mohammed bin Abdulla Al Khalifa (Chairman)

Bahrain Air (Arabic: طيران البحرين) was an airline of the Kingdom of Bahrain, headquartered in the Mohamed Centre in Muharraq. Its main base was Bahrain International Airport. The airline flew to 16 destinations in the Middle East, Africa and South Asia. In earlier statements the airline planned to increase its destinations to 23 cities by 2009 and up to 25 cities by 2010. Prior to its voluntary liquidation in 2013, Bahrain Air flew to 17 destinations (flights to Alexandria were seasonal). In 2012, the airline complained via local media about the measures undertaken by the Minister of Transportation, also the competing airline Gulf Air's head of restructuring committee when the airline's route schedule and frequencies were reduced by up to 30% without prior notice. The airline, having sought every route possible to overcome the Minister's act of conflict of interest, declared bankruptcy on 12 February 2013. The airline had complained of conflict of interest.

Bahrain Air had started operations on 1 February 2008 as a low-cost airline but changed its operating model to full service by early 2010. The airline was headed in the UAE by its Country Manager, Rashid Al Moosa and by its UAE-Sales & Marketing Nicky Bijlaney The inaugural flight occurred on 3 February 2008, from Bahrain to Dubai. The airline used a new Airbus A320 fleet, with 12 seats in business and 150 in economy. The airline had its own in-flight magazine, called Reesha. Bahrain Air was one of the few airlines which did not serve alcoholic beverages on its flights.

== Destinations ==
Bahrain Air used to serve the following destinations (as of December 2012):

| Country | City | Airport | Notes |
|---|---|---|---|
| Bangladesh | Chittagong | Shah Amanat International Airport | |
| Bangladesh | Dhaka | Shahjalal International Airport | |
| Bahrain | Bahrain | Bahrain International Airport | Hub |
| Egypt | Alexandria | Borg El Arab Airport | |
| Ethiopia | Addis Ababa | Bole International Airport | |
| India | Kochi | Cochin International Airport | |
| India | Kozhikode | Calicut International Airport | |
| India | Mumbai | Chatrapati Shivaji International Airport | |
| India | Trivandrum | Trivandrum International Airport | |
| Iraq | Baghdad | Baghdad International Airport | Terminated |
| Iraq | Najaf | Al Najaf International Airport | Terminated |
| Iran | Mashhad | Mashhad International Airport | |
| Jordan | Amman | Queen Alia International Airport | |
| Kuwait | Kuwait City | Kuwait International Airport | |
| Lebanon | Beirut | Rafic Hariri International Airport | |
| Nepal | Kathmandu | Tribhuvan International Airport | |
| Qatar | Doha | Doha International Airport | |
| Saudi Arabia | Dammam | King Fahd International Airport | |
| Saudi Arabia | Jeddah | King Abdulaziz International Airport | |
| Saudi Arabia | Riyadh | King Khalid International Airport | |
| Sudan | Khartoum | Khartoum International Airport | |
| Syria | Damascus | Damascus International Airport | |
| Turkey | Istanbul | Sabiha Gökçen International Airport | |
| United Arab Emirates | Dubai | Dubai International Airport | |
