= Al Eslah Society =

Bahrainian Islamic organization

The Al Eslah Society (Arabic: جمعية الإصلاح; translation: "the reform society") is an Islamist organization in Bahrain. Its political wing is the Al-Menber Islamic Society.

The president and patron of the Al Eslah Society is Isa bin Mohammed Al Khalifa, a member of the Al Khalifa royal family and former labor minister of Bahrain.

The name of the society is sometimes transliterated as "Al Islah Society".

== See also ==
- Mohammed Khalid
