= Rashid Al Marikhi =

Islamic scholar

Rashid al-Muraykhi

Personal life
- Born: Bahrain
- Children: Ibrahim Al Muraikhi
- Main interest(s): Sufism, Islamic jurisprudence
- Notable work: Raf' al-Astar 'an Shubuhat wa Dalalat Sahib al-Hiwar
- Occupation: Scholar, Teacher

Religious life
- Religion: Islam
- Denomination: Sunni
- Creed: Maliki

Muslim leader
- Influenced by: Mohammed Al Hijazi, Mohammed Abil Mulla, Abbas Bin Alawi Al Maliki, Abdul Qadir Al Saggaf

Rasid ibn Ibrahim al-Murayki (Arabic: راشد بن ابراهيم المريخي, romanized: Rāshid ibn ʾIbrāhīm al-Muraykhī) is a Bahraini Islamic scholar of the Maliki school. A Sufi teacher, he used to be the khatib of the Shaykh Isa Bin Ali Mosque in Muharraq until 1988. He has been praised for his role in bridging the Sunni-Shia sectarian divide in Bahrain and has warm relations with Shia scholars in Bahrain. As a leader of the Sufi tradition in Bahrain, he has endorsed traditional Sufi ceremony such as the Mawlid in which he recites poems about the event.

His son, Shaikh Ibrahim Al Muraikhi, is the chief justice of the Supreme Sunni Sharia Court in Bahrain and the president of the Imam Malik ibn Anas Society. The Imam Malik Society is the only registered Sufi organization in Bahrain.

Among Shaikh Rashid's published works is Raf' al-Astar 'an Shubuhat wa Dalalat Sahib al- Hiwar ("Exposing the Insinuations and Aggravations of the Author of the 'Debate with al-Maliki").

Among his teachers are Shaikh Mohammed Al Hijazi of Muharraq, Shaikh Mohammed Abil Mulla of al-Hasa, Shaikh Abbas Bin Alawi Al Maliki of Mecca (brother of Muhammad Alawi al-Maliki), and Shaikh Abdul Qadir Al Saggaf of Jeddah.
