= 2010 Bahraini general election =

- 23 October 2010 (first round); 30 October 2010 (second round)
- All 40 seats in the Council of Representatives; 21 seats needed for a majority
Party	Leader	Seats	+/–
Al Wefaq	Ali Salman	18	+1
Al Asalah	Ghanim Al Buaneen	3	−2
Al-Menber	Salah Ali	2	−5
Independents	–	17	+6
This lists parties that won seats. See the complete results below.
Results by constituency
Speaker of the Council before	Speaker of the Council after
Khalifa Al Dhahrani; Independent	Khalifa Al Dhahrani; Independent

General elections were held in Bahrain in October 2010 to elect all 40 members of the Council of Representatives to a four-year term. The opposition Al Wefaq organization, led by Sheikh Ali Salman, won the most seats. The first round of voting was held on 23 October amidst boycotts and arrests, with a second round on 30 October. Four women were elected to the lower house.

== Campaign ==
Several opposition groups in Bahrain called for a boycott of the elections. The Haq Movement, led by Hasan Mushaima, along with the Al-Wafa Islamic Movement of Abdulwahab Hussain and the Bahrain Freedom Movement of Saeed al-Shehabi, issued a joint statement urging citizens not to participate. Separately, the Khalas Movement and the Islamic Action Society also called for a boycott, arguing that taking part in the elections would be “tantamount to accepting the unjust sectarian apartheid system.”

Ahead of the elections, there were reports of arrests and repression targeting the Shia Muslim majority. Shia political activists and international human rights organizations warned that Bahrain was experiencing a “drift back to full-blown authoritarianism.” In response, Foreign Minister Sheikh Khaled bin Ahmad al-Khalifa stated that the arrests were “not linked to elections.” Amnesty International, Human Rights Watch, and the Project on Middle East Democracy all documented government crackdowns and arrests in the lead-up to the vote.

== Conduct ==
The elections were overseen by the Higher Committee for the Supervision of the Fairness of Referendums and Council Member Elections, a body that was not independent. Its chairman was the Minister of Justice and Islamic Affairs, himself appointed by the King, and the committee’s members were also nominated by the minister.

A total of 292 Bahraini observers from domestic non-governmental organizations monitored the elections, but foreign observers were not permitted.

On election day, allegations of irregularities were reported. Ali Salman of Al Wefaq claimed that at least 890 voters in predominantly Shia districts were unable to vote because their names were missing from the electoral lists. He noted that this figure was likely an undercount and that the party was compiling reports from affected voters to challenge the official results presented by the government.

== Results ==
More than 318,000 people were eligible to vote. Head of the electoral commission and Justice Minister, Sheikh Khaled bin Ali al-Khalifa, gave an estimate of "at least 67 percent" turnout, less than the 72% in 2006, but significantly higher than 53.4% in 2002. 127 candidates stood in the election.

Al Wefaq won 18 of the 40 seats, one more than in the previous election. Shia and independent candidates won a majority of seats for the first time.

Party	First round			Second round			Total seats	+/–
Party	Votes	%	Seats	Votes	%	Seats	Total seats	+/–
Al Wefaq			18			0	18	+1
Al Asalah			2			1	3	–2
Al-Menber Islamic Society			0			2	2	–5
Independents			11			6	17	+6
Total			31			9	40	0
Registered voters/turnout	318,668	–		171,000	–			
Source: IPU

=== Winning candidate by constituency ===
Governorate	District	Candidate	Party	First round		Second round	
Governorate	District	Candidate	Party	Votes	%	Votes	%
Capital	1	Adel Assoumi	Independent	1,878	65.32		
Capital	2	Khalil al-Marzooq	Al Wefaq	2,141	58.40		
Capital	3	Hadi Al Mousawi	Al Wefaq	1,926	85.64		
Capital	4	Abduljalil Khalil	Al Wefaq	Elected unopposed			
Capital	5	Mohammed Mezel	Al Wefaq	1,667	67.24		
Capital	6	Abdulrahman Bumajeed	Independent	1,144	56.89		
Capital	7	Abdulmajid Al Sebea	Al Wefaq	1,842	63.45		
Capital	8	Jameel Kadhim	Al Wefaq	2,818	86.20		
Muharraq	1	Adel Mouwda	Al Asalah	Elected unopposed			
Muharraq	2	Abdul Hameed Al Meer	Independent	1,357	43.83	1,737	58.60
Muharraq	3	Ali Ahmed	Al Menber	1,140	37.11	1,675	55.03
Muharraq	4	Mahmoud Al Mahmoud	Independent	1,904	26.41	3,418	52.58
Muharraq	5	Isa Al Kooheji	Independent	1,891	57.62		
Muharraq	6	Ali Al Asheeri	Al Wefaq	4,422	83.77		
Muharraq	7	Othman Sharif	Independent	4,562	55.72		
Muharraq	8	Ghanem Al Buainain	Al Asalah	2,099	42.85	2,774	59.49
Northern	1	Matar Matar	Al Wefaq	7689	85.72		
Northern	2	Ali Al Aswad	Al Wefaq	6,577	87.71		
Northern	3	Abdul Hussain Al Metghawi	Al Wefaq	6,523	89.98		
Northern	4	Hassan Al Dossari	Independent	1,545	57.82		
Northern	5	Mohammed Majeed	Al Wefaq	5,132	86.76		
Northern	6	Mohammed Ismail Al Ammadi	Al Menber	3,263	45.22	3,777	56.82
Northern	7	Jassim Hussain	Al Wefaq	5,107	59.03		
Northern	8	Jawad Fairooz	Al Wefaq	5,954	54.99		
Northern	9	Hassan Sultan	Al Wefaq	8,814	89.43		
Central	1	Salman Abdullah Salem	Al Wefaq	6,175	67.49		
Central	2	Abdullah Al Aali	Al Wefaq	7,242	88.99		
Central	3	Adnan Al Maliki	Independent	1,875	45.18	2,533	59.36
Central	4	Isa Al Qadhi	Independent	3,237	43.13	3,905	55.99
Central	5	Abdali Mohammed Hassan	Al Wefaq	3,501	56.65		
Central	6	Hassan Isa	Al Wefaq	5,308	91.96		
Central	7	Abdulhalim Murad	Al Asalah	3,178	55.9		
Central	8	Ali Zayed	Independent	3,108	39.75	3,888	50.20
Central	9	Khalifa Al Dhahrani	Independent	3,586	77.42		
Southern	1	Jassim Al Saeedi	Independent	2,538	62.71		
Southern	2	Abdullah Huwail	Independent	1,194	52.44		
Southern	3	Ahmed Al Mulla	Independent	968	30.6	2012	71.99
Southern	4	Abdullah Al Dossari	Independent	Elected unopposed			
Southern	5	Khamis Al Rumaihi	Independent	Elected unopposed			
Southern	6	Lateefa Al Gaood	Independent	Elected unopposed			
Source: Bahrain Commission for Legislation and Legal Opinion and Alwasat Newspaper

== Reactions ==
Shia cleric and MP Sheikh Ali Salman lauded the result and called for a "more positive" stance from the government. "The most important message for the government is that Al Wefaq (INAA) is the largest political association in Bahrain. The people's will must be respected and dealt with positively."

== Analysis ==
A local analyst, Obaidaly al-Obaidaly, said the press campaign that accompanied the arrests resulted in a favourable outcome for Al Wefaq. "The Shiites who were hesitant or intended to boycott the elections voted overwhelmingly in favour of Al Wefaq, the representative of their community. Baqer al-Najar, a sociology professor at the University of Bahrain also said "The way the media handled the security situation which prevailed prior to the elections unexpectedly raised Al Wefaq's shares. Shiites felt that they were targeted so they voted intensely for Al Wefaq despite their restlessness with its performance throughout the past four years."

== Aftermath ==
Following the 2011 Bahraini protests, all 18 Al Wefaq MPs resigned from parliament.
