= Ministry of Transportation (Bahrain) =

Government ministry of Bahrain

Ministry of Transportation and Telecommunications
- وزارة المواصلات والاتصالات

Ministry overview
- Jurisdiction: Cabinet of Bahrain
- Minister responsible: Abdullah bin Ahmed Al Khalifa, Minister of Transportation and Telecommunications
- Child Ministry: Civil Aviation Affairs
- Website: mtt.gov.bh

The Ministry of Transportation and Telecommunications is a government ministry of Bahrain. It is headquartered on the 9th, 32nd, and 33rd floors of the East Tower of Bahrain Financial Harbour in Manama. The ministry was previously called the Ministry of Transportation from its establishment on August 25, 1975 until its abolition on December 11, 2006. On February 12, 2012, the ministry was re-established, with the Ministry of Communications being incorporated into it, and the name of the ministry became the Ministry of Transportation and Telecommunications.

== Agencies ==
- Civil Aviation Affairs

== See also ==
- Transport in Bahrain
