= Muharraq =

Muharraq المحرق
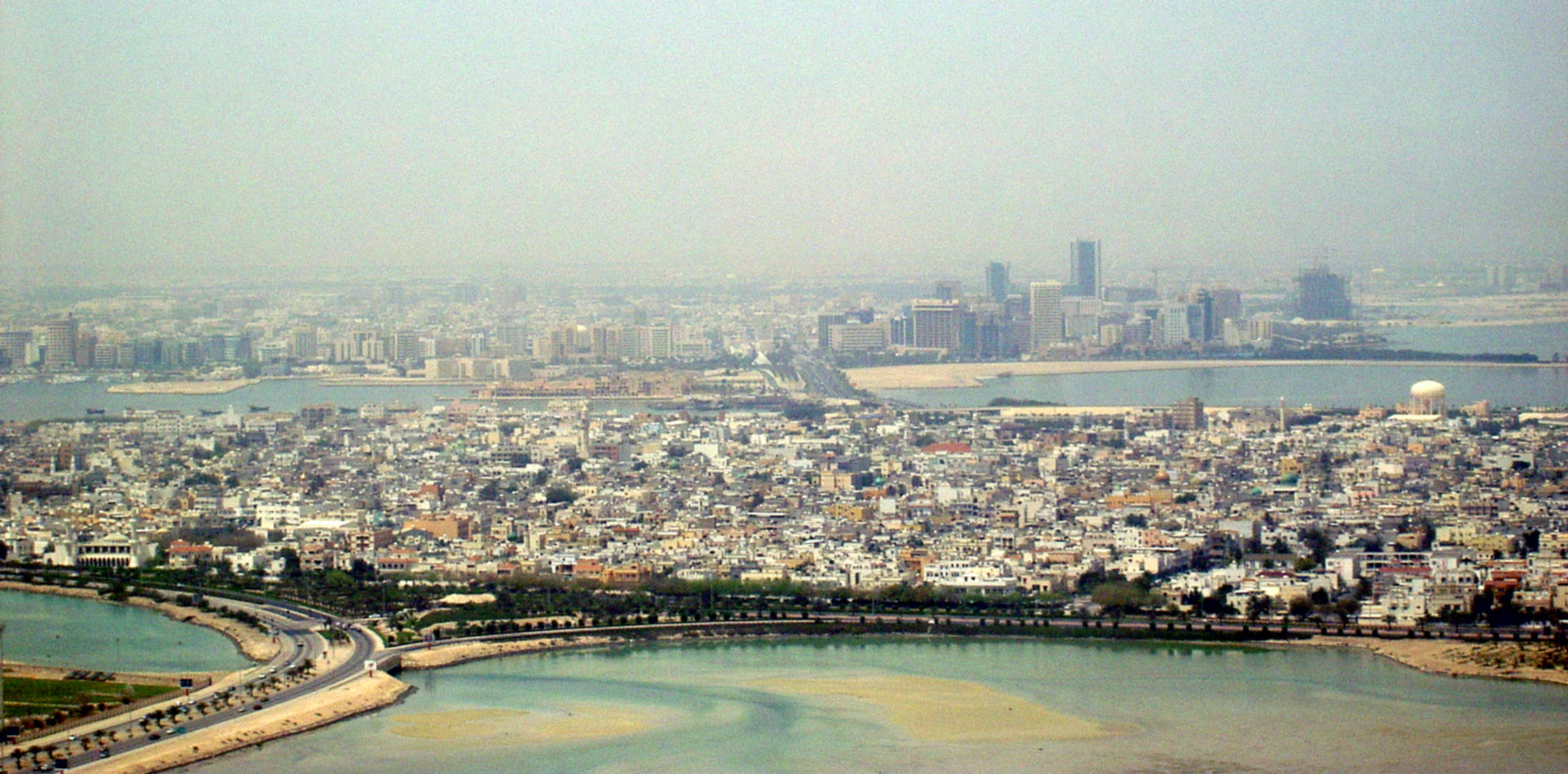
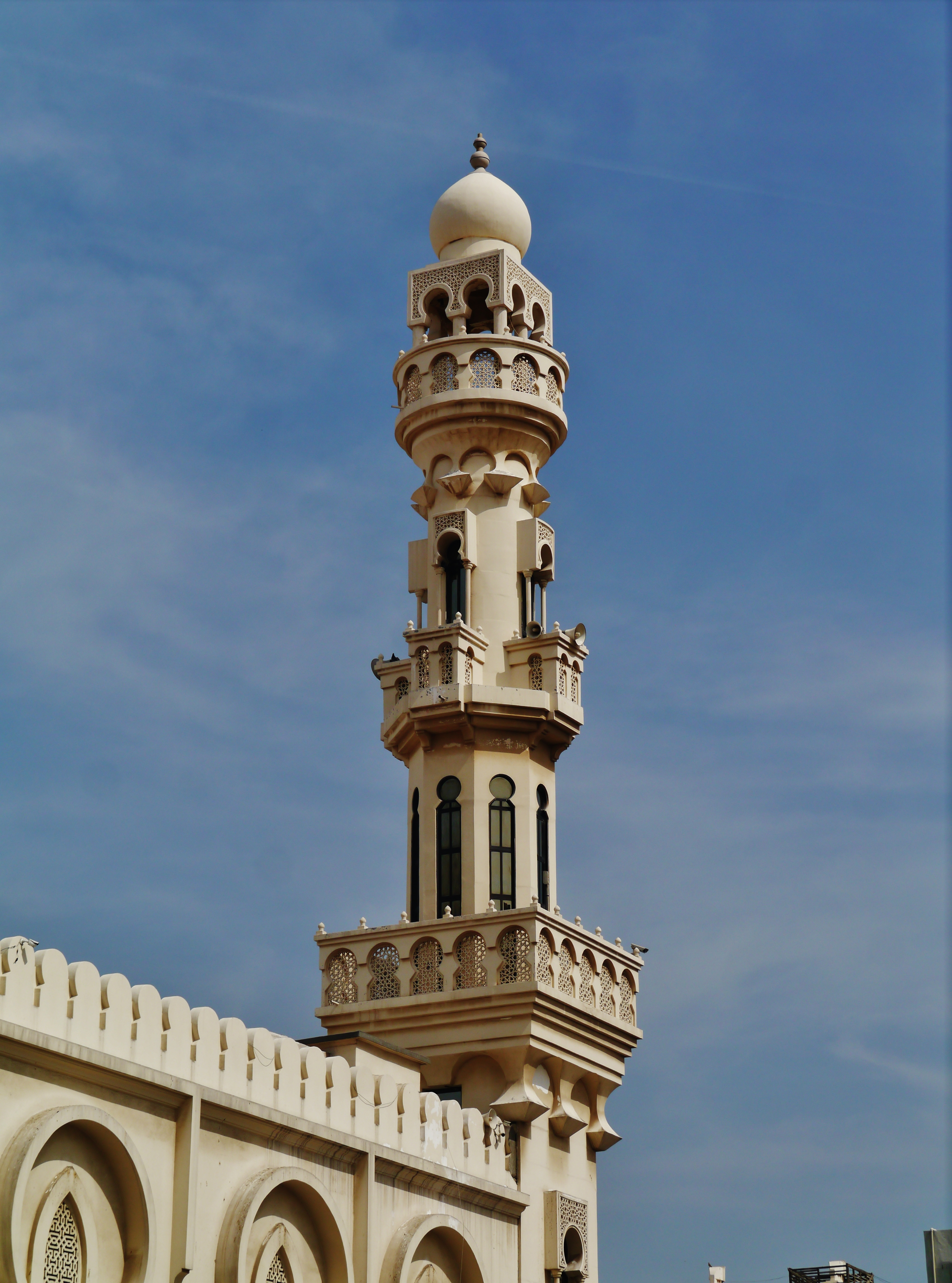
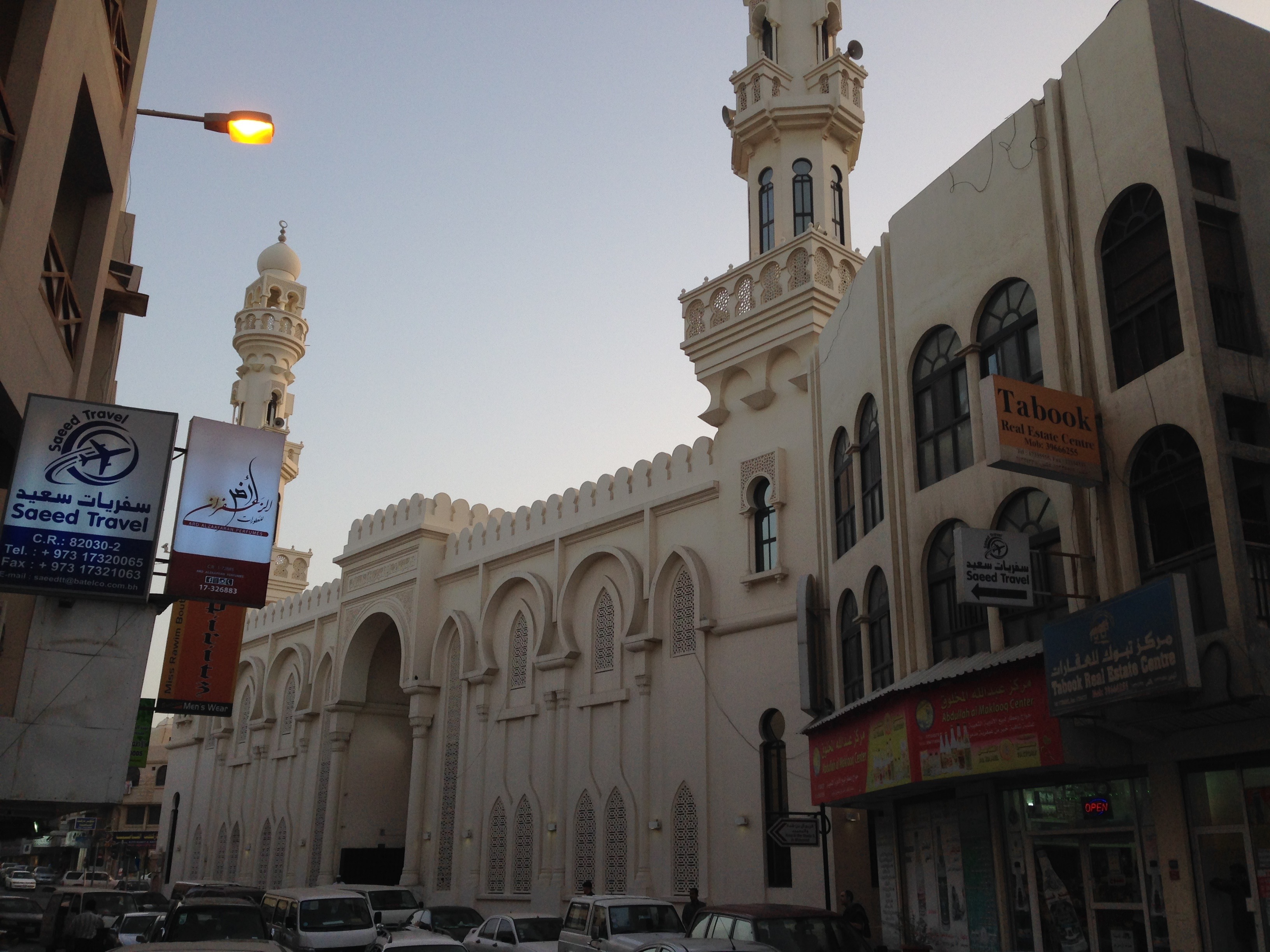
- Muharraq skyline c. 2003 Minarett of the Shaikh Isa bin Ali Mosque Pearling pathway

- Location in Bahrain
- Coordinates: 26°15′12″N 50°36′30″E
- Country: Bahrain
- Governorate: Al Muharraq Governorate

Area
  - Total: 57.50 km^{2} (22.20 sq mi)

Population (2012)
  - Total: 176,583
  - Density: 3,291/km^{2} (8,520/sq mi)

Muharraq (Note: /muhɑːrək/) (Arabic: المحرق, romanized: al-Muḥarraq) is Bahrain's third-most populous city (Note: After the capital Manama and Riffa) and served as its capital until 1932 when it was replaced by Manama. The population of Muharraq in 2020 was 263,373.

Muharraq served as the country's capital until 1932. It rose to prominence during the 19th century as the center of Bahrain's pearling industry, playing a vital economic and cultural role. The city retains much of its traditional character, with historic buildings, mosques, and markets that reflect its maritime heritage. Today, Muharraq is recognized for its preservation efforts and is part of the UNESCO-listed Pearling Path.

The city of Muharraq lies on the eastern edge of Bahrain, directly across the water from Manama, and is connected to the capital by a series of causeways. It is a densely built urban area bordered by the Persian Gulf and features a mix of old neighborhoods and modern infrastructure. Muharraq's compact layout preserves a traditional Gulf urban pattern, with narrow streets and close-knit communities near the coast.

Muharraq, part of Bahrain's urban landscape, reflects the country's relatively high HDI, which benefits from investment in education, health care and economic growth. The city has experienced development through infrastructure expansion and economic diversification, including tourism and finance, while maintaining its cultural heritage. Geopolitically, Muharraq's location near Bahrain International Airport and along the Persian Gulf situates it within the Gulf Cooperation Council (GCC), a regional bloc focused on cooperation among Gulf states.

== History ==
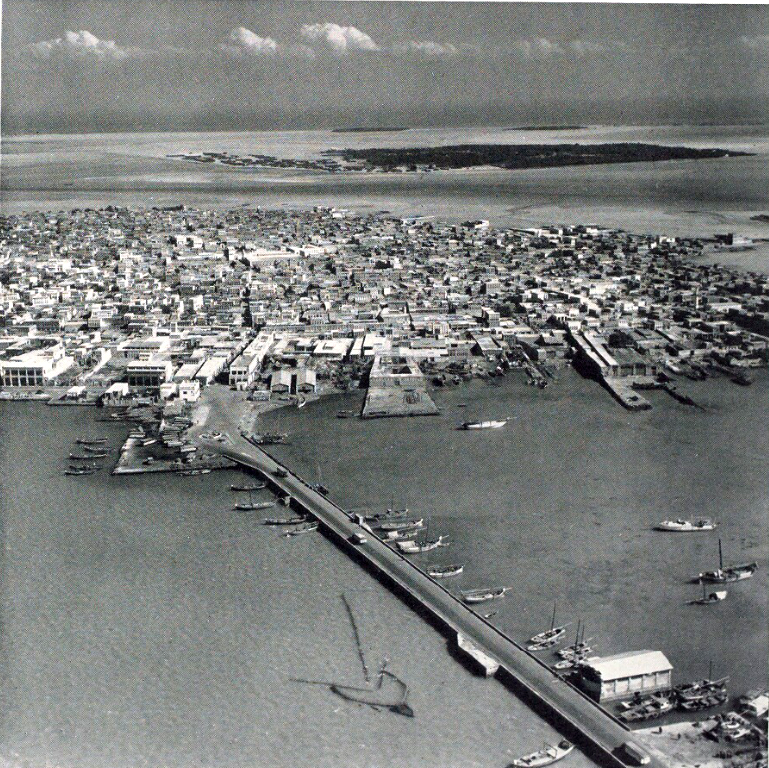
Muharraq in 1953.

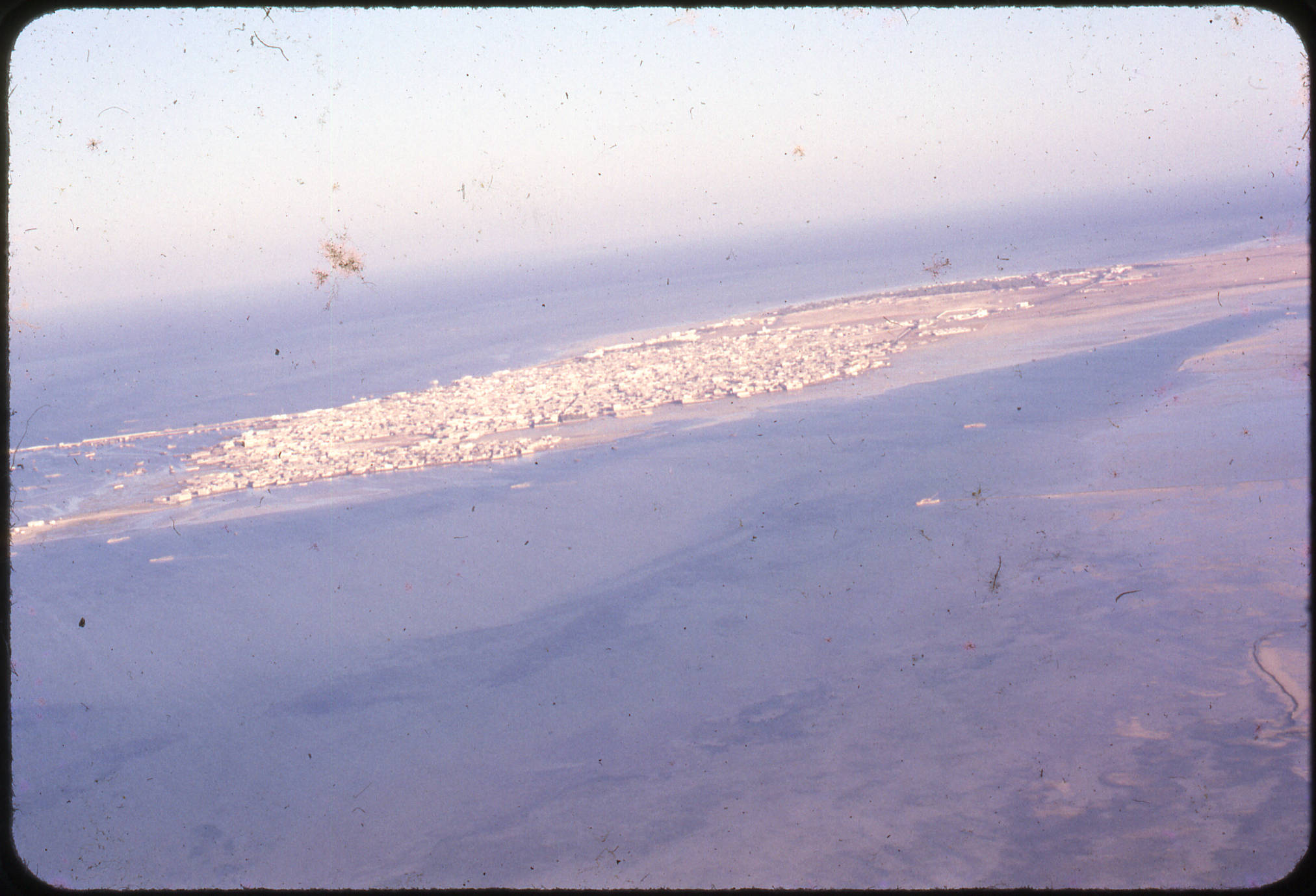
Muharraq in 1961.

Muharraq was originally part of Dilmun, a Semitic speaking Bronze Age polity. Later, it became the city of Arwad on the island of Tylos (as Bahrain was referred to in antiquity), believed by some (including Strabo and Herodotus) to be the birthplace of Phoenicia. At the end of Persian rule, Bahrain came under the domination of the Seleucid Greeks, and Muharraq was the centre of a pagan cult dedicated to the ox god, Awal.

By the 5th century AD, Muharraq had become a major centre of Nestorian Christianity, which had come to dominate the southern shores of the Persian Gulf. As a sect, the Nestorians were often persecuted as heretics by the Byzantine Empire, but Bahrain was outside the Empire's control, offering safety. The names of several of Muharraq's villages today reflect this Christian legacy, with Al-Dair meaning 'the monastery' and Qalali meaning a 'monk's cloisters'.

Taken by the Portuguese (1521) and the Persians (1602), Al-Muḥarraq passed to the control of the Āl Khalīfah dynasty in 1783 with the rest of Bahrain.

== Culture ==
The city is recognized as a "Design City" by UNESCO. Several traditional houses in the old town have been restored as cultural venues by the Shaikh Ebrahim bin Mohammed Al Khalifa Center for Culture and Research, among them Bin Matar House, the 1905 majlis of the pearl merchant Salman bin Hussain bin Matar.

== Economy ==
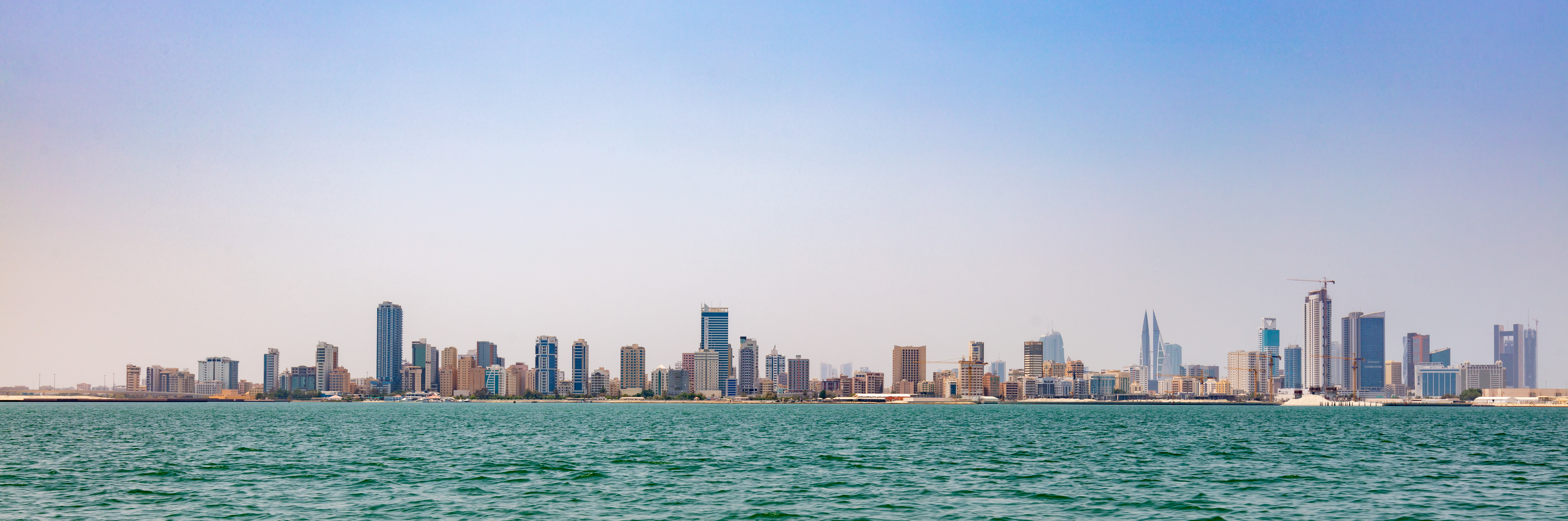
View of Manama from Muharraq

Gulf Air has its headquarters in Muharraq, and Bahrain Air formerly had its headquarters at Mohamed Centre in Muharraq.

== Government and infrastructure ==
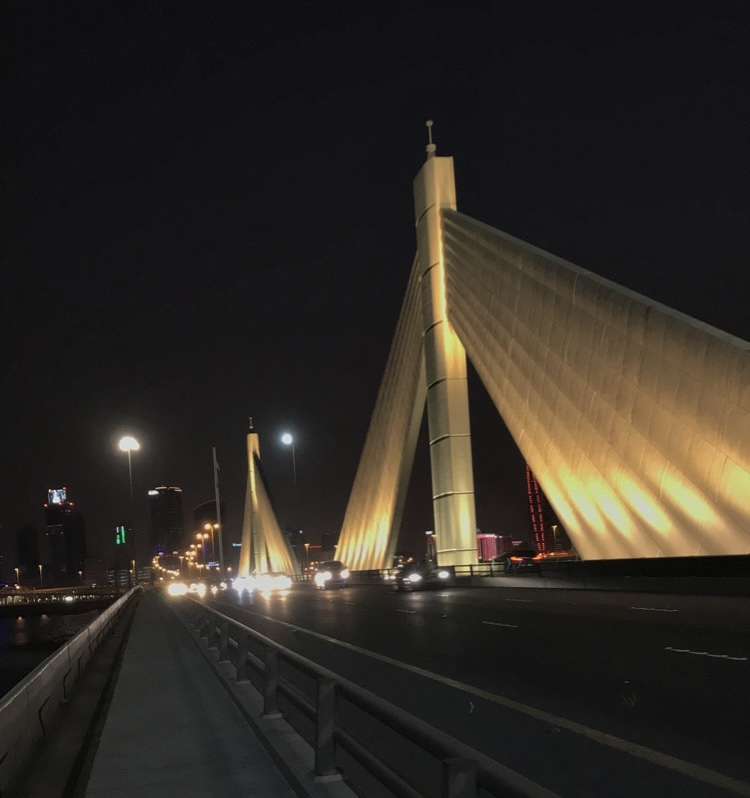
Shaikh Isa Causeway, a major bridge connecting Manama to Muharraq

Muharraq houses the headquarters of the Civil Aviation Affairs, an agency of the Ministry of Transportation.

== Education ==
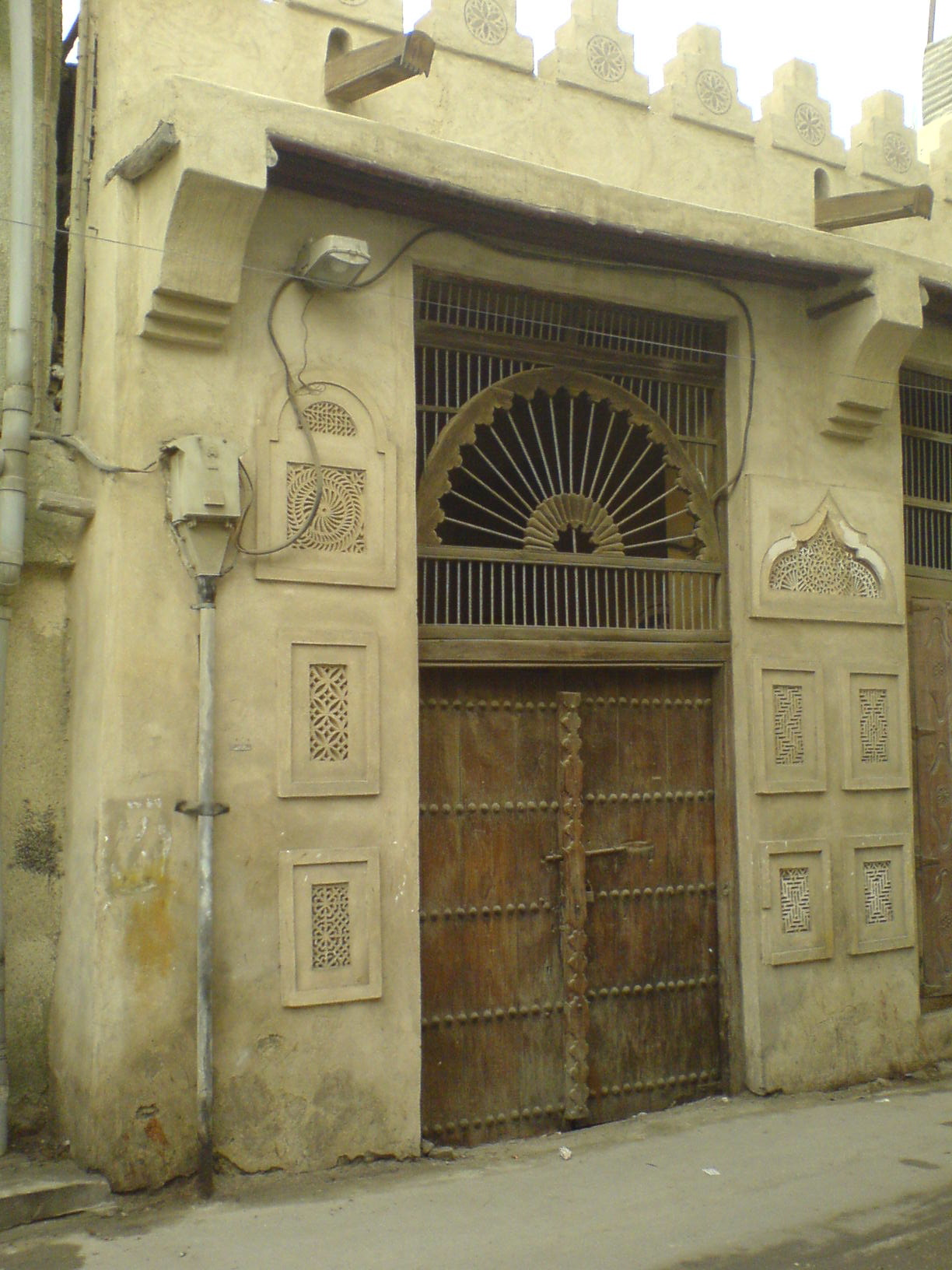
A doorway in the traditional architectural style in Muharraq

Sa'ada waterfront on Muharraq island.

The Ministry of Education of Bahrain operates public government schools.

Boys schools include Abu Farias Al-Hamdani Primary Boys School, Al-Maari Primary Boys School, Hassan bin Thabit Primary Boys School, Omer bin Abdulazeez Primary Boys School, Sheikh Mohammed bin Essa al-Khalifa Primary Boys School, Omer bin Al-Kattab Primary Intermediate Boys School, Abdul-Rahman Al-Nasser Intermediate Boys School, Tariq bin Zeyad Intermediate Boys School, and Moharraq Secondary Boys School.

Girls schools include A'amena bint Wahab Primary Girls School, Al-Muharraq Primary Girls School, Mariam bent Omran Primary Girls School, Zubaida Primary Girls School, Istiklal, Khadija al-Kubra Intermediate Girls School, Zanoobia Intermediate Girls School, and Muharraq Secondary Girls School.

The French School of Bahrain is located in Busaiteen, in Muharraq Municipality.

== Firjan (districts) ==
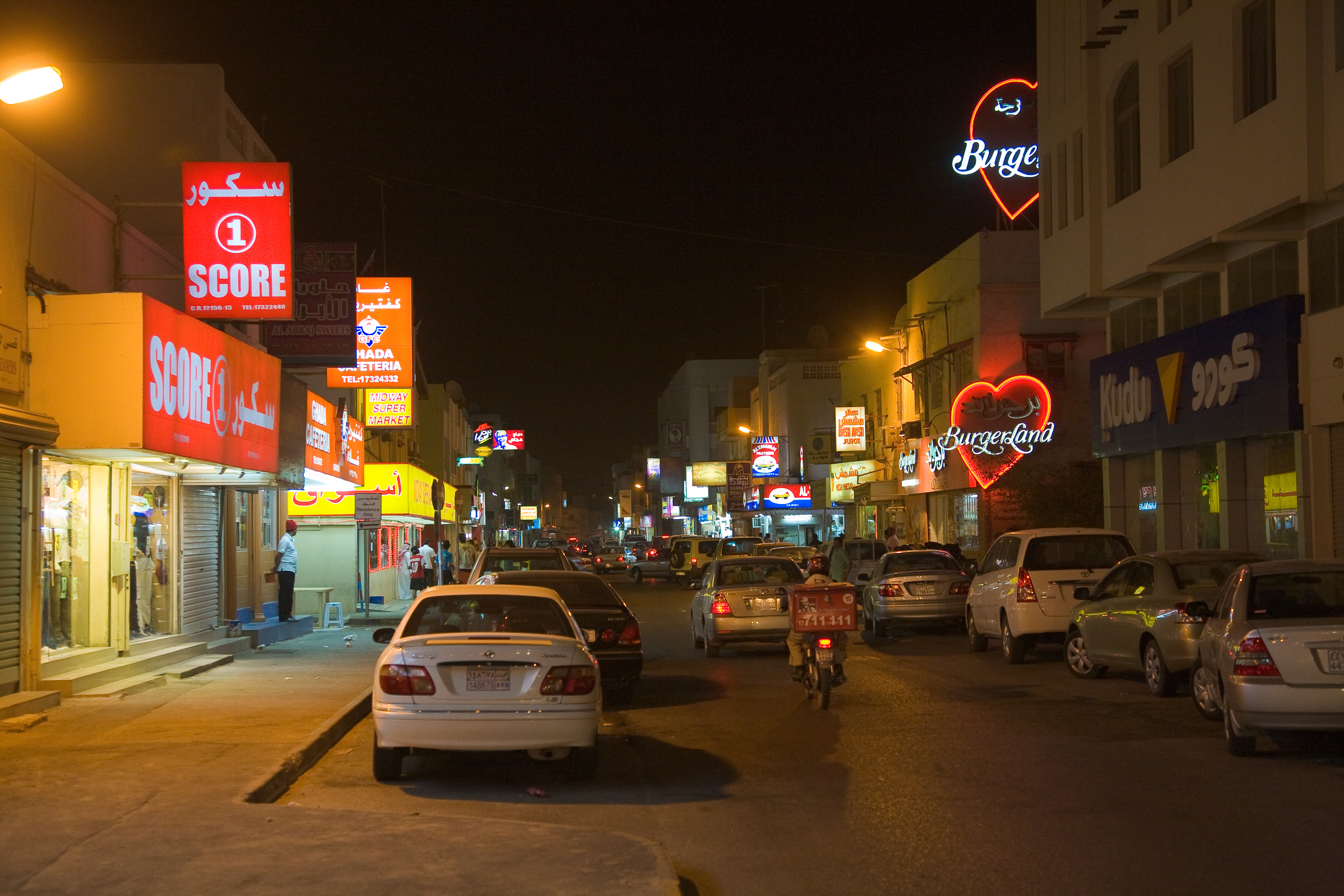
A street in Muharraq

Firjan is the plural of the Arabic word Fareej which translates to district. The oldest and largest Fareej in Muharraq is Fareej Al Bin Ali. It was established by Sunni Arabs belonging to the Al Bin Ali tribe in the 17th century and until recently, members of the tribe still lived in that Fareej.

Other Firjan in Muharraq include: Al Bu Khmais, Al-Gumra, Al-Zayayina, Al-Ma'awida, Bin Ghatim, Al-Jowder, Bin Hindi, Al-'Amamira, Al-Mahmeed, Al-Hayaj (or Al-Hayayej), Al-Sanqal, Al-Dosa, Al-Sagha, Sheikh Abdullah Sheikh Hamad, and Bin Khatir are all Sunni districts. Unlike Manama's firjan which are mostly Shia, Muharraq has firjan which are mostly Sunni.

== Notable people ==
- Mohammed Al-Buainain, politician
- Ebtisam Hejres, politician

== See also ==
- Amwaj Islands, man-made islands near Al Muharraq.
- Christianity in Eastern Arabia
