= 2014 Bahraini general election =

- 22 November 2014 (first round); 29 November 2014 (second round)
- All 40 seats in the Council of Representatives
Party	Leader	Seats	+/–
Al Asalah	Ghanim Al Buaneen	2	−1
Al-Menber	Salah Ali	1	−1
Independents	–	37	+20
This lists parties that won seats. See the complete results below.

General elections were held in Bahrain in November 2014 to elect all 40 members of the Council of Representatives. The first round of voting took place on 22 November, with a second round on 29 November in the 34 constituencies in which no candidate received a majority.

The elections were boycotted by the Shiite Islamist opposition party Al-Wefaq. Of the 266 candidates, 22 were women. According to election officials, 349,713 Bahrainis, including 175,998 men and 173,175 women, were listed to vote. Although the government announced the voter turnout as 52.6%, the opposition claimed it was only 30%.

Independents won 37 of the 40 seats with Sunni Islamists losing two of their five seats. The number of Shiite MPs fell to 14 as a result of the Al-Wefaq boycott. Female representation was reduced from four to three.

== Electoral system ==
The 40 members of the Council of Representatives were elected in single-member constituencies using the two-round system. Voters and candidates were required to be Bahrani citizens and at least 20 years old. Non-citizens, primarily migrant workers from India, Bangladesh and Pakistan, who migrated to Bahrain in recent decades, made up more than half of Bahrain's population at the time of the election.

== Background ==
The first elections in 2002 were boycotted by the most popular political parties, including the Shiite Islamist Al-Wefaq National Islamic Society. Voter turnout was 53%, with the highest number of seats won by the conservative Salafist Al Asalah Islamic Society and the Islamic Forum, each of which won 6 seats of the 40 elected.

Al-Wefaq lifted its boycott for the 2006 elections, although the breakaway Haq Movement continued to call for a boycott. Voter turnout increased to 72%, with Al-Wefaq winning 17 of the 40 seats and Sunni Islamists from Al Asalah and the Muslim Brotherhood-aligned Al-Menbar Islamic Society winning 12 in total. However, the King's uncle Khalifa bin Salman Al Khalifa continued as Prime Minister, with around half of the cabinet drawn from the ruling Al Khalifa family.

The 2010 elections saw the Sunni Islamists lose most of their seats to independents. Al-Wefaq took 64% of the vote despite the arrest of opposition spokespersons and allegations of vote rigging. However, they only increased their total to 18 seats due to unequal electoral boundaries. Two months later, the Arab Spring protests started in Tunisia, spreading to Bahrain in February 2011 with the start of the Pearl uprising. In a brutal crackdown backed by 1,500 troops from Saudi Arabia and the United Arab Emirates, the government cleared the main protest site at the Pearl Roundabout. All 18 members of Al-Wefaq resigned from parliament and the party was temporarily banned. The vacant seats were won by independents in the subsequent by-elections.

== Campaign ==
A record 266 candidates stood for election in the 40 constituencies, including a record 22 women. Only 36 of these candidates represented political parties, with the remaining 230 running as independents. The candidates were described as being "mostly Sunni", despite the country's Shia majority. Opposition media said most of these were "random unknowns" who were just running a "good package" that included "$150,000 a year, a generous pension plan, a diplomatic passport and a car".

In October 2014 five opposition parties, including Al Wefaq and the leftist al Wa'ad, announced that they would boycott the elections, claiming that they would not be fair and the election was an attempt to establish "absolute rule in Bahrain".

Nine political parties in total contested the elections. The Al-Menbar Islamic Society formed a coalition called the 'Al-Fateh Coalition' with three other political groups: the National Unity Gathering, al Meethaq and al Wasat. Al Asalah ran alone as did the secular al Watan.

== Results ==
The first round saw only six candidates elected, with 34 seats going forward to a second round on 29 November. The six candidates included one from al Asalah and five independents. Al Asalah had three candidates through to the second round, Al-Menbar had four, with two each from al Meethaq, Wasat and al Watan and one from Al Wasat Al Arabi.

The second round saw victories for only two candidates from the political societies - one from Al Asalah and one from Al-Menbar, leaving both Islamist groups down one MP. The largest gains were for independents, 14 of whom were from the Shiite majority. Only 10 of the 40 elected MPs were outgoing members of the previous parliament. Of the 23 female candidates, only three were elected (one fewer than in 2010).

Party	First round			Second round			Total seats	+/–
Party	Votes	%	Seats	Votes	%	Seats	Total seats	+/–
Al Asalah			1			1	2	–1
Al-Menber Islamic Society			0			1	1	–1
Al Meethaq			0			0	0	0
Al Wasat			0			0	0	0
Al Watan			0			0	0	0
Al Wasat al Arabi			0			0	0	0
National Unity Gathering			0			0	0	0
Independents			5			32	37	+20
Total			6			34	40	0
Source: Gulf News

== Aftermath ==
Following the elections, the incumbent government led by Prime Minister Prince Khalifa Bin Salman Al Khalifa resigned on 30 November 2014, as required by the constitution, with a cabinet reshuffle announced on 7 December.

After the election of members of the Council of Representatives, the King appointed the 40 members of the Consultative Council and the National Assembly was sworn in for a new term on 14 December.
