= Al-Menber Islamic Society =

Al-Menber Islamic Society جمعية المنبر الوطني الإسلامي
- Leader: Ali Ahmed Abdulla
- Founded: 2002
- Headquarters: Muharraq
- Ideology: Islamism
- Religion: Sunni Islam
- International affiliation: Muslim Brotherhood
- Council of Representatives: 0 / 40
- Shura Council: 0 / 40

Website
- almenber.bh

The Al-Menber National Islamic Society (Arabic: جمعية المنبر الوطني الإسلامي, lit. 'Islamic National Tribune') is the political wing of the Sunni Islamist Al Eslah Society in Bahrain and Bahrain's branch of the Muslim Brotherhood. The president and patron of the Al Eslah Society is Shaikh Isa bin Mohammed Al Khalifa, a member of the Al Khalifa royal family and former labor minister of Bahrain. Prominent members of Al-Menber include Salah Abdulrahman, Salah Al Jowder, and outspoken MP Mohammed Khalid. The party has generally backed government-sponsored legislation on economic issues, but has sought a clampdown on pop concerts, sorcery and soothsayers. Additionally, it has strongly opposed the government's accession to the International Covenant on Civil and Political Rights.

A Sunni Islamic party, it is well organised through a network of mosques and seeks to promote a conservative social agenda while not directly challenging the Kingdom's government. It became a political society in 2006. Previously, it was merely a think tank and public affair society. Bahrain does not allow political parties by traditional definition.

The group often cooperates with the salafi political bloc Asalah, especially on issues involving religious affairs and morals. Minbar seeks a personal status law that conforms to Sharia and is acceptable to both Shia and Sunni sects. At times, Al-Menber has seemed significantly more liberal than either the pro-business Independent Bloc and Asalah, particularly in its opposition to proposed legislation that it argues would restrict freedom of assembly. In February 2006, Al-Menber led parliament's refusal to ratify the government's signature of the International Covenant on Civil and Political Rights, with the party's president, Dr. Salah Ali, explaining, "[The Convention] means that Muslims could convert to another religion, something against the Islamic law." In the 2006 Bahraini parliamentary election, they worked out a deal with Asalah to avoid splitting the Sunni Islamist vote.

On the issue of women's political rights in Bahrain, Al-Menber MP Ali Ahmed told the Bahrain Tribune (26 January 2006):

Granting women their political rights is not against Islamic precepts. Women should be motivated to achieve their aspirations and contribute to the Kingdom’s development. We support women’s political empowerment and want to field the best women who can win. We believe that having a female head of state or president is against religious regulations, but any post below that is open to women.

In the 2006 general election, the party promised to field several female candidates, with eye specialist Dr Haifa Al Mahmood apparently selected; however after an electoral pact was worked out with Asalah, which opposes women candidates, Al-Menber produced an all-male list of candidates. The party has though backed women's rights activists' campaign for the introduction of a unified personal status law, which was vehemently opposed by Shia Islamists.

== Electoral history ==
The group won three seats in the Bahraini Council of Representatives (parliament) in the 2002 election, seven seats at the 2006 election, but only two seats at the 2010 election and one seat at the 2014 election. It did not win any seats at the 2018 election.

=== Council of Representatives elections ===
Election	Party leader	Votes	%	Seats	+/–	Position
2002				3 / 40	▲3	▲3rd
2006	Salah Abdulrahman			7 / 40	▲4	▲2nd
2010		5,452		2 / 40	▼5	▼3rd
2014				1 / 40	▼1	▲2nd
2018				0 / 40	▼1	

== See also ==
- List of Islamic political parties
- List of political parties in Bahrain
- Mohammed Khalid
