= Council of Representatives (Bahrain) =

Lower house of the National Assembly of Bahrain

Council of Representatives مجلس النواب Majlis an-nuwab
- 6th Legislative Session

Type
- Type: Lower house of the National Assembly

Leadership
- Speaker: Ahmed bin Salman Al-Musallam since 12 December 2022
- Secretary-General: Abdullah bin Khalaf Al Dosari since 27 October 2018

Structure
- Seats: 40 members
- Political groups: Independents (40)

Elections
- Voting system: Two-round system
- Last election: 12-19 November 2022
- Next election: 12 November 2026

Meeting place
- Manama

Website
- www.nuwab.bh/en/

The Council of Representatives (Arabic: مجلس النواب, romanized: Majlis an-nuwab), sometimes translated as the "Chamber of Deputies", is the name given to the lower house of the Bahraini National Assembly, the bicameral national legislative body of Bahrain.

The council was created by the 2002 Constitution of Bahrain and consists of forty members elected by universal suffrage. Members are elected for four-year terms from single-member constituencies using a two-round system, with a second round being held between the top two candidates if no candidate receives 50% of the vote in the first round. Candidates must be Bahraini citizens and at least 30 years old.

The forty seats of the Council of Representatives together with the forty royally-appointed seats of the Consultative Council form the Bahraini National Assembly.

The last election for the council was the 2022 Bahraini general election held on 12 November 2022, with the runoff on 19 November. Following the election, Ahmed bin Salman Al-Musallam was on 12 December 2022 elected chairman of the council.

== History ==
The first election under the 2002 Constitution was the 2002 Bahraini general election, which was boycotted by the Shia Islamist Al Wefaq, the country's largest political party, as well as the left-wing National Democratic Action Society, the Nationalist Democratic Rally Society, and the radical Shia Islamist Islamic Action Society. They claimed that the 2002 Constitution gave too much power to the unelected Consultative Council, and demanded a reform of the constitution. Although all candidates ran as independents due to the ban on political parties, six political societies gained representation in the Council of Representatives. The Islamic Forum and al Asalah both won six seats, Rabita al-Islami won three seats, the Shura Society and the National Democratic Assembly both won two seats, whilst al Meethaq won one.

At the 2006 Bahraini general election, the four parties that boycotted the 2002 elections fielded candidates. To meet the challenge posed by Al Wefaq, the two main Sunni Islamist parties, the salafist Asalah and the Muslim Brotherhood-affiliated Al-Menbar Islamic Society, agreed to form a coalition to maximise their votes. At the election, Al Wefaq won 17 seats, Al-Menbar won 7 seats and Asalah won 5 seats. 11 seats were won by independents.

At the 2010 Bahraini general election, Al Wefaq won 18 seats, Al-Menbar won 2 seats and Asalah won 3 seats. 17 seats were won by independents. Two months later, the Arab Spring protests that started in Tunisia, spread to Bahrain in February 2011 with the start of the Pearl uprising. In a brutal crackdown, backed by 1,500 troops from Saudi Arabia and the United Arab Emirates, as part of the Peninsula Shield Force, the government cleared the main protest site at the Pearl Roundabout. All 18 members of Al-Wefaq resigned from the Council in protest at governmental actions during the uprising and the party was temporarily banned. The vacant seats were won by independents in the subsequent by-elections.

At the 2014 Bahraini general election, Al Wefaq again boycotted the election. Independents won 37 seats with Sunni Islamists losing two of their five seats. The number of Shiite MPs fell to 14 as a result of the Al-Wefaq boycott.

At the 2018 Bahraini general election, Al-Wefaq and secular Waad were barred from fielding candidates, prompting renewed calls for a boycott. A court had banned Al Wefaq in 2016 for "harbouring terrorism", inciting violence and encouraging demonstrations which threatened to spark sectarian strife. According to Saudi-owned Al Arabiya television and international print media report, Bahrain's highest court dissolved Al Wefaq and confiscated the group's funds in July 2016. Waad was banned on terrorism charges in June 2017. At the election, independents won 35 seats, Al Asalah won 3 seats and Al -Minbar, (effectively the successor to the National Liberation Front – Bahrain) won 2 seats.

== Role in government ==
=== Legislative powers ===
Under the constitution, the Council of Representatives can propose constitutional amendments, legislation, accept or refuse decrees of law.

=== Oversight ===
Under the constitution, the Council of Representatives can express its wishes regarding public matters, question cabinet ministers in writing or person, table a vote of no confidence against cabinet ministers, a vote of no confidence in the Prime Minister is called a "motion of non-cooperation".

=== Motion of non-cooperation ===
A motion of non-cooperation against the Prime Minister can be held only after a threshold of ten members of the Council of Representatives bring forward a request, it is then voted on and requires a simple majority to pass. The council deliberates & then has another vote to pass a motion of non-cooperation. The motion requires a majority of two-thirds to pass. If passed it is under the King's discretion to either relieve the Prime Minister from their post & appoint a new cabinet or dissolve the Council of Representatives.

Before the amendment of the constitution in 2012, a motion of non-cooperation required a majority of two-thirds of the Council of Representatives to bring forward a request. The entire National Assembly consisting of both houses then had to convene to hold a vote of a motion of non-cooperation. A majority of two-thirds was required to pass a motion of non-cooperation.

To date, the Council of Representatives has not brought forward a motion of non-cooperation.

== Demonstration of authority ==
In March 2012, the Council of Representatives for the first time since the council's establishment in 2002 voted to reject a royal decree issued by King Hamad bin Isa Al Khalifa. The decree was to increase the government's share in the revenues of Tamkeen, the country's labour fund, from 20% to 50%.

== Electoral commission ==
Sheikh Khaled bin Ali al-Khalifa, the Minister of Justice, is also the head of the electoral commission.

== See also ==
- Bahraini National Assembly
- Consultative Council of Bahrain
- List of speakers of the Council of Representatives of Bahrain
- Politics of Bahrain
- List of legislatures by country
