= Education in Bahrain =

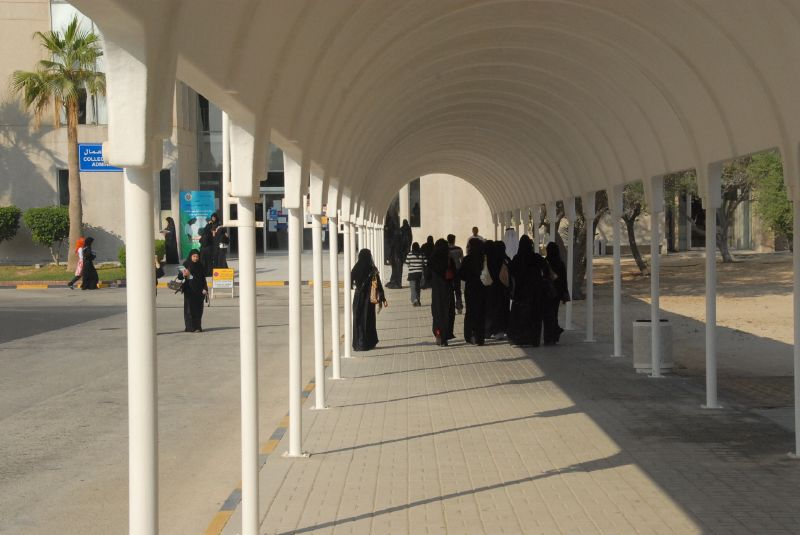
Students at the University of Bahrain

Bahrain has the oldest public education system in the Arabian Peninsula. The system was established in 1932 when the Bahraini government assumed responsibility for operating two pre-existing primary public schools for boys. Subsequently, separate girls' schools and various universities were established in the 20th century. According to data from the 2010 census, the literacy rate of Bahrain stands at 94.6%. As of 2016, education expenditure accounts for 2.7% of Bahrain's GDP.

The Ministry of Education is responsible for education in the country.

== History ==
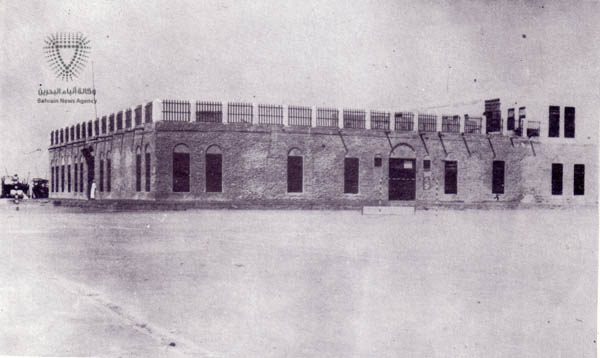
Al-Hidaya Al-Khalifia Boys school.

Quranic schools were the only source of education in Bahrain prior to the 20th century; such schools were primarily dedicated to the study of the Qur'an. The first modern school to open in the country was a missionary elementary school setup in 1899 in Manama by the Reformed Church in America, with the school's syllabus comprising English, Mathematics and the study of Christianity. Leading merchants in the country sent their children to the school, which later became known as the American Mission School. It was renamed Al Raja School in 1980 and operates till the present day.

Parents who could afford to fund their children's studies often sent them to schools in Bombay or Baghdad. Families of a predominately religious background often sent their children to religious institutions in the region, to madrasas in Mecca and al-Hasa in mainland Arabia for Sunni students and to Najaf and Karbala for Shia students. As a result of this traditional religious education, there was a negative stigma attached to the American Mission School and only a few parents were bold enough to send their children to the school. Prior to the establishment of a public school in the country, Shia and Sunni students had limited interactions during their education. This can be attributed to different environments of learning; outside of religious institutions, Shia students acquired knowledge from matams whereas Sunni students did from majlises although neither matam nor majlis were officially recognised as educational institutions in their own right.

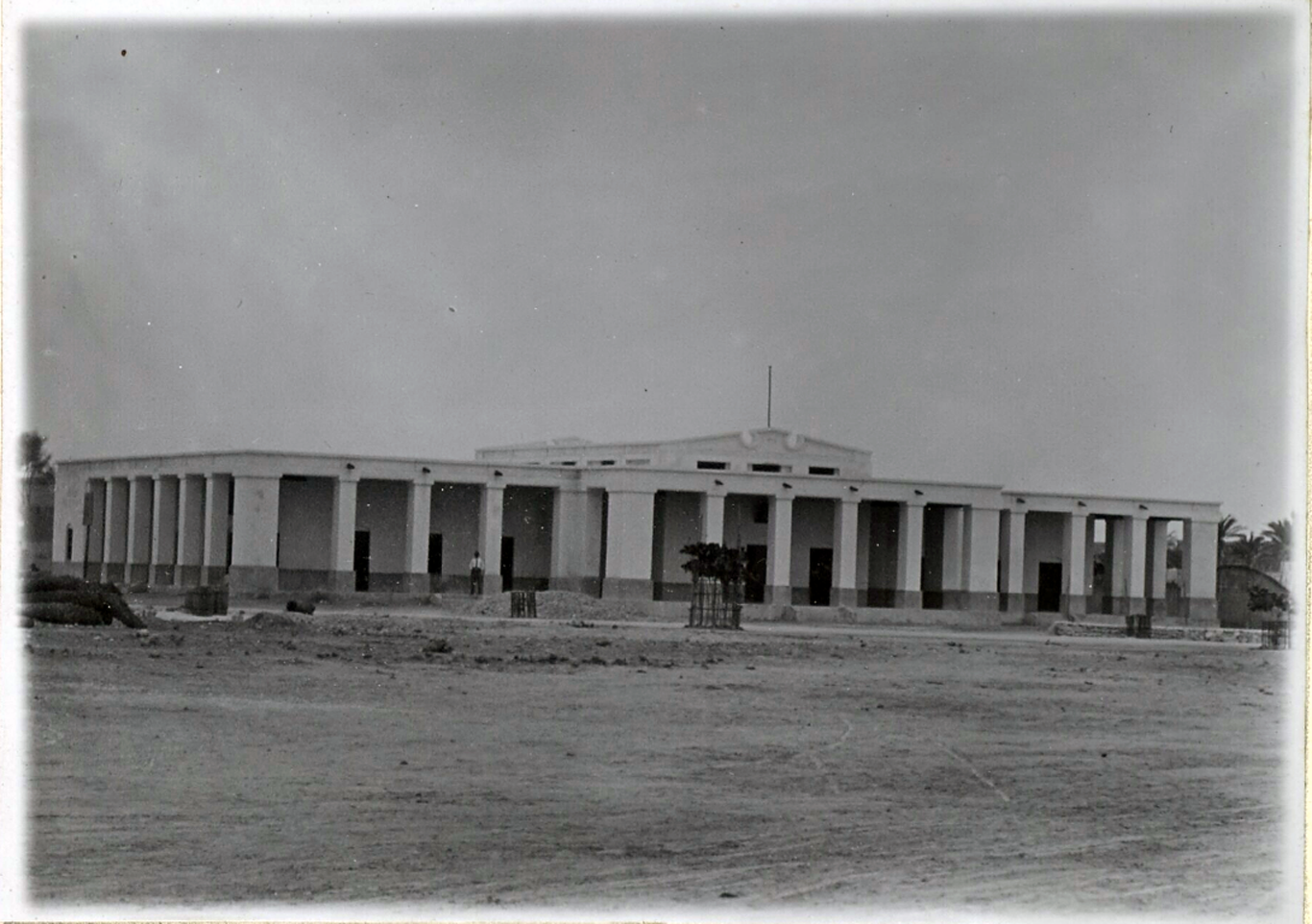
The Jafaria school in Manama, 1931.

Following the end of the First World War, Western ideas became more widespread in the country, culminating in the opening of the first public school of Bahrain, Al-Hidaya Al-Khalifia Boys school, in the island of Muharraq in 1919. The school was founded by prominent citizens of Muharraq and was endorsed by the Bahraini royal family. The country's first Education Committee was established by several leading Bahraini merchants, headed by Shaikh Abdulla bin Isa Al-Khalifa, the son of the then-ruler of Bahrain Isa ibn Ali Al Khalifa, who acted as the de facto Minister of Education. The Education Committee was also responsible for managing the Al-Hidaya Boys school. The school was in fact the brainchild of Shaikh Abdulla, who suggested the idea after returning from post-World War I celebrations in England.

In 1926, a second public school for boys opened up in the capital city, Manama. Two years later, in 1928, the first public school for girls was established. Due to financial constraints suffered by the Education Committee, the Bahraini government took control of the schools in 1930.

== Government schools ==
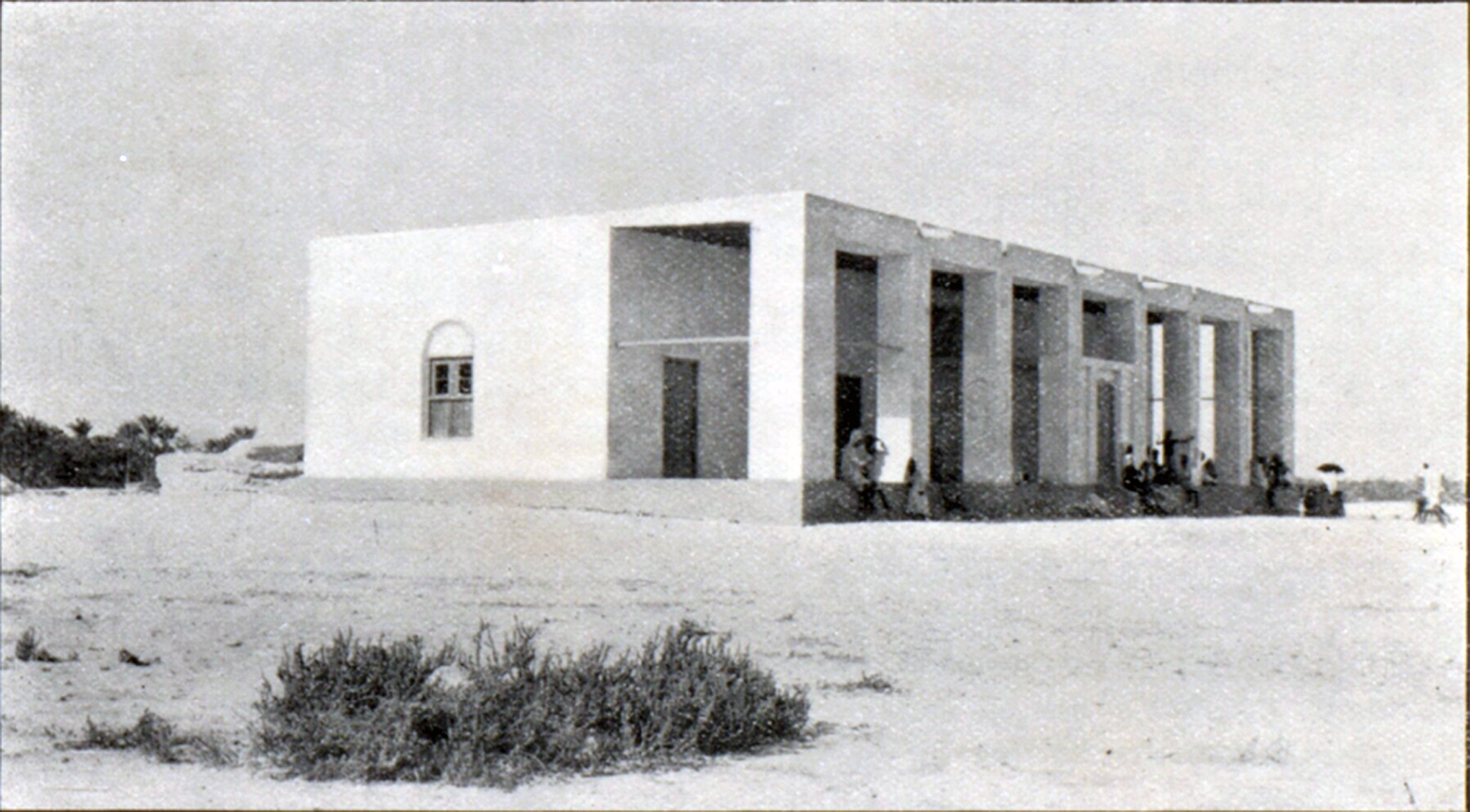
A village school, circa 1937.

In the 1991–92 academic year, 99,348 students attended 129 public schools. Education in the public system, which included six-year primary schools, three-year intermediate schools, and three-year secular secondary schools, is free. Students receive transportation to and from school at no charge. Almost all children in the six- to eleven-year-old age-group attend primary school, and about two-thirds of all twelve- to fourteen-year-olds are enrolled in intermediate schools.

In the academic year of 2008/2009 the number of public classes in Bahrain ( including religious classes) are 4326, with the number of male students 62381 and female students 63233. with a distribution of 62172 in primary classes, 32327 in preparatory classes (junior high) and 31115 in secondary schools.

== Private schools ==
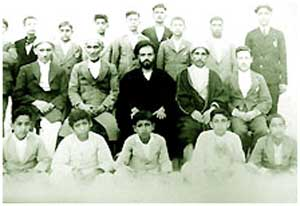
Students of the Persian School in 1939.

In addition to the American Mission School, another foreign private school was opened in 1910; Al-Ittihad school, funded by the Persian community of Bahrain.

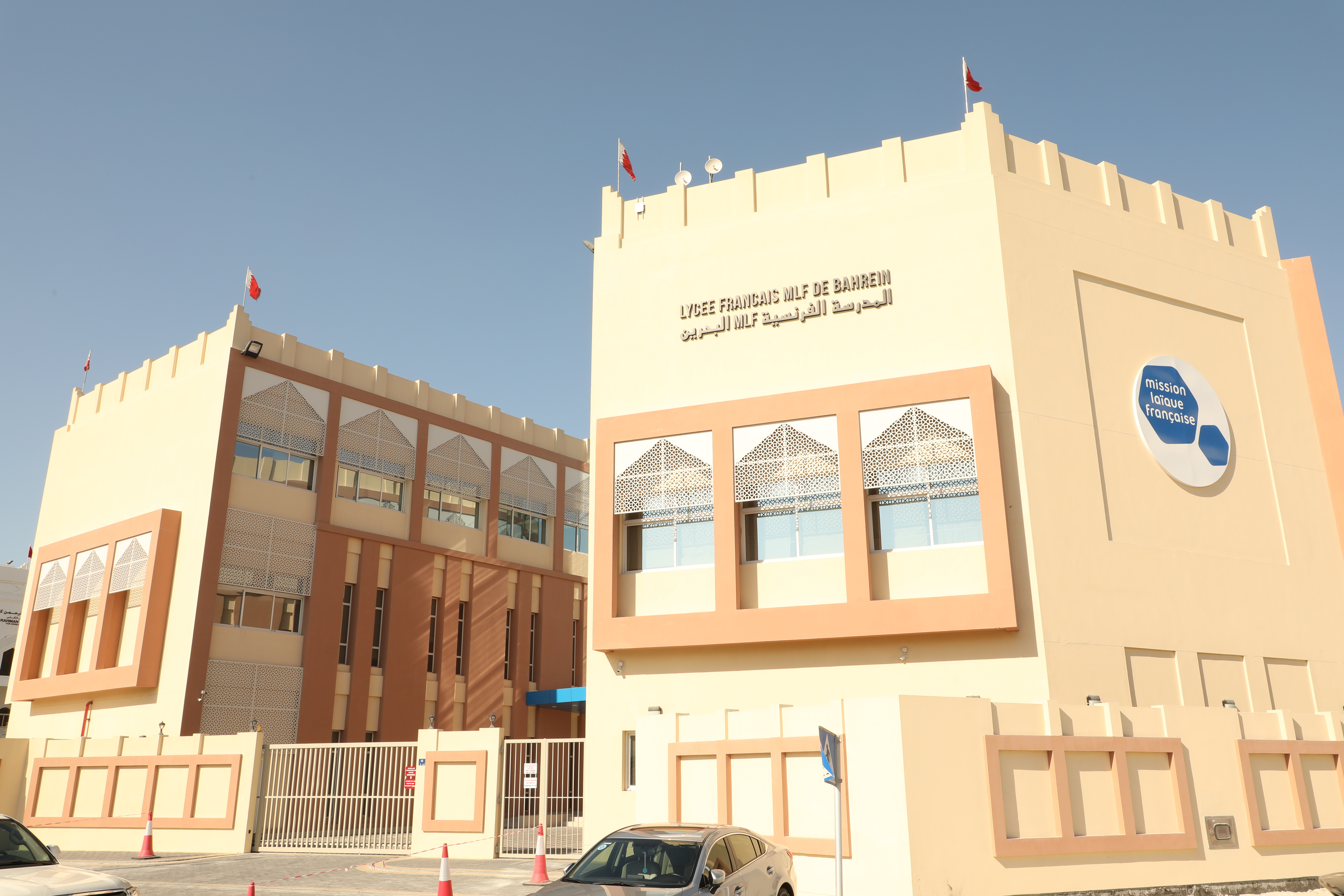
The French School of Bahrain

In addition to the public education system, there are forty-eight private and religious schools, including the United States operated and accredited Bahrain School, which offers classes from primary school through secondary school. In Bahrain there were 6,400 teachers in the 1988–1989 academic year, of whom 65 percent were native Bahrainis. Egyptians constituted the largest group of foreign teachers. Bahrain also is home to St Christopher's School, which the Guardian has named as one of the eight best international schools in the world, the only school in the Middle East to make the list. 10 universities provide internationally recognized qualifications. Other notable schools includeBritish School of Bahrain, The Indian School and Sacred Heart School.

In October 2021, Al Hekma International School has agreed upon the Sharakah Agreement with American University of Sharjah (AUS) to encourage students from varied socio-economic backgrounds to be considered for partial scholarships.

== Higher education ==
In 1927 the first group of Bahrainis to receive a university education enrolled at the American University of Beirut in Lebanon. The first institution of higher education in Bahrain, the Gulf Polytechnic, was established in 1968 as the Gulf Technical College. In 1984 Gulf Polytechnic merged with the University College of Art, Science, and Education (UCB), founded in 1979, to create a national university offering Bachelor of Arts and bachelor of science degrees. During the 1991–92 academic year, more than 4,000 students, half of whom were women, studied at the University of Bahrain.

Kingdom University was founded in 2001 and opened in Riffa in 2004.

In 2008 a new Bahrain Polytechnic opened on the University of Bahrain's old campus location at Isa Town.

Bahrain had three additional institutions of higher education in 1993. The College of Health Sciences, established in 1976, offers various medical technology and nurses' training programs. The Hotel and Catering Training Center offers postsecondary vocational courses in management and culinary arts. The Arabian Gulf University (AGU), was established outside Riffa in 1984 and funded by the six member countries of the GCC. Construction of AGU facilities, however, was delayed by the decline in oil revenues experienced by all GCC states in the mid-1980s. The first faculty, the College of Medicine, opened in the fall of 1989 and provided medical education for fifty-eight aspiring physicians. The projected completion date for the AGU campus is 2006; officials anticipate that AGU will accommodate 5,000 students annually, once the university becomes fully operational.

The AGU campus has been completed to contain a faculty of medicine, faculty of agriculture and Princess Jawhara of Saudi Arabia donated a centre for molecular biology & inherited disorders. Built right across the street from the campus to encourage the development of regional research in this issue.

Further liberalisation of the education sector has occurred in Bahrain. With new private universities being founded, the Quality Assurance Authority for Education and Training was created to ensure the quality of programs offered by the universities.

The 2010s saw the establishment of the British University of Bahrain in 2018 and the American University of Bahrain in 2019.

== See also ==
- List of educational institutions in Bahrain
