= Women in Bahrain =

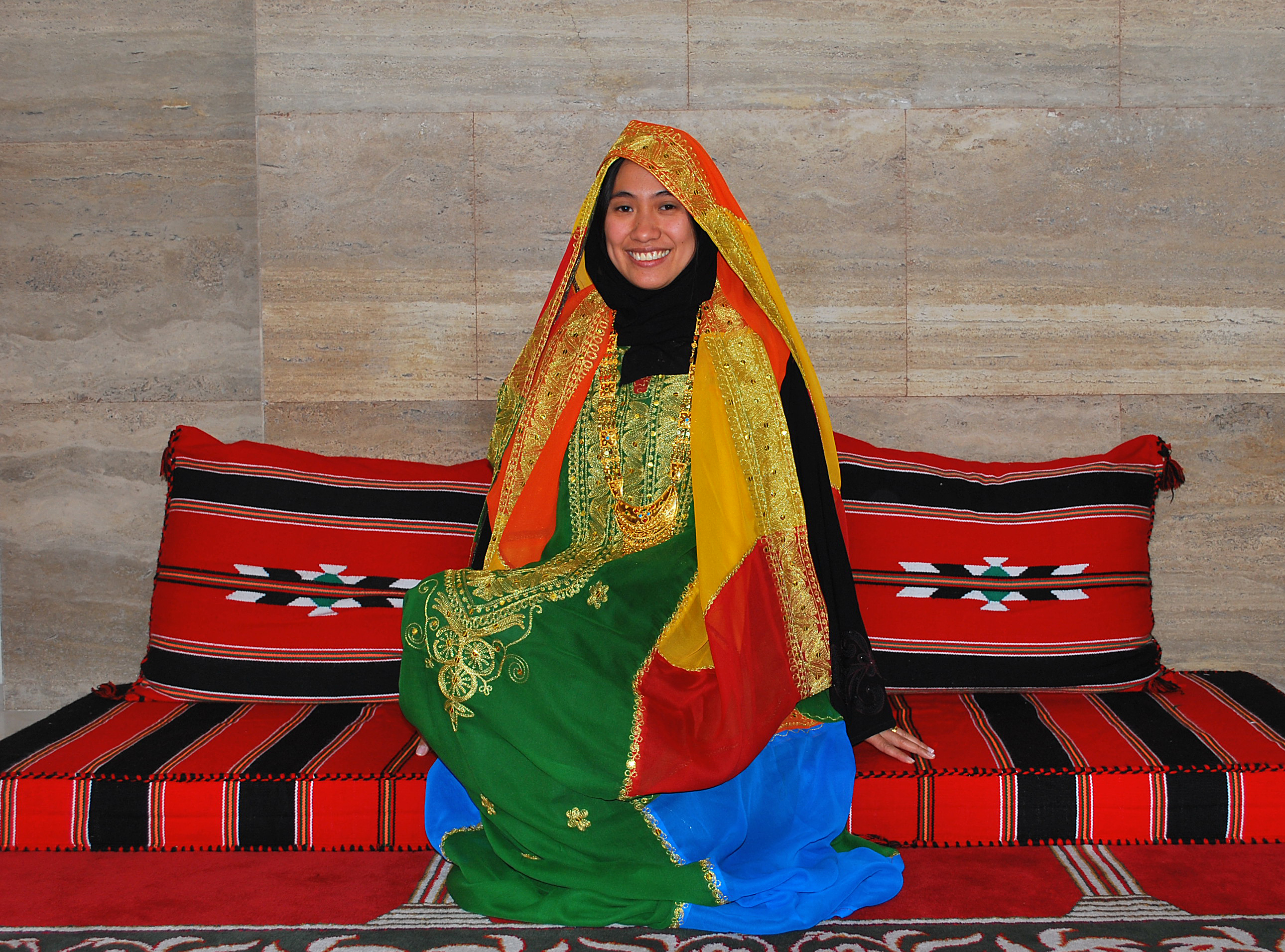
- A Bahraini woman in traditional wedding garb

General statistics
- Maternal mortality (per 100,000): 14 (2017)
- Women in parliament: 15% (2020)
- Women over 25 with secondary education: 74.4% (2010)
- Women in labour force: 45.3%(2019)

Gender Inequality Index
- Value: 0.181 (2021)
- Rank: 46th out of 191

Global Gender Gap Index
- Value: 0.684 (2025)
- Rank: 104th out of 148

Women in Bahrain are provided freedoms in every aspect of their life and their personal liberties are long respected, both by the laws of Bahrain and by Bahraini society in general. Life and work opportunities are widely available in all positions and industries. Bahraini Women's Day is annually celebrated on December 1.

== Traditional Attire ==
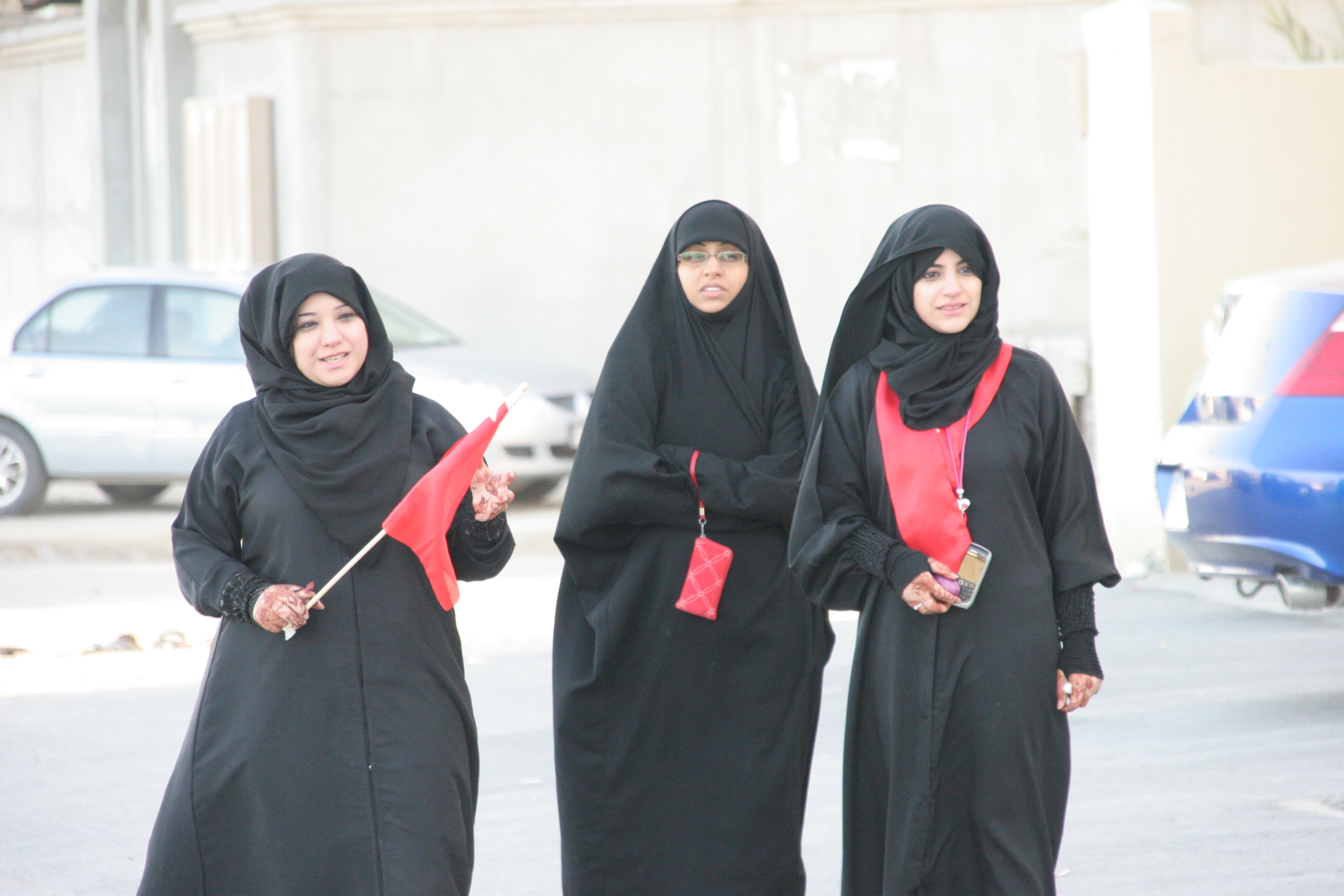
Bahraini women wearing the hijab

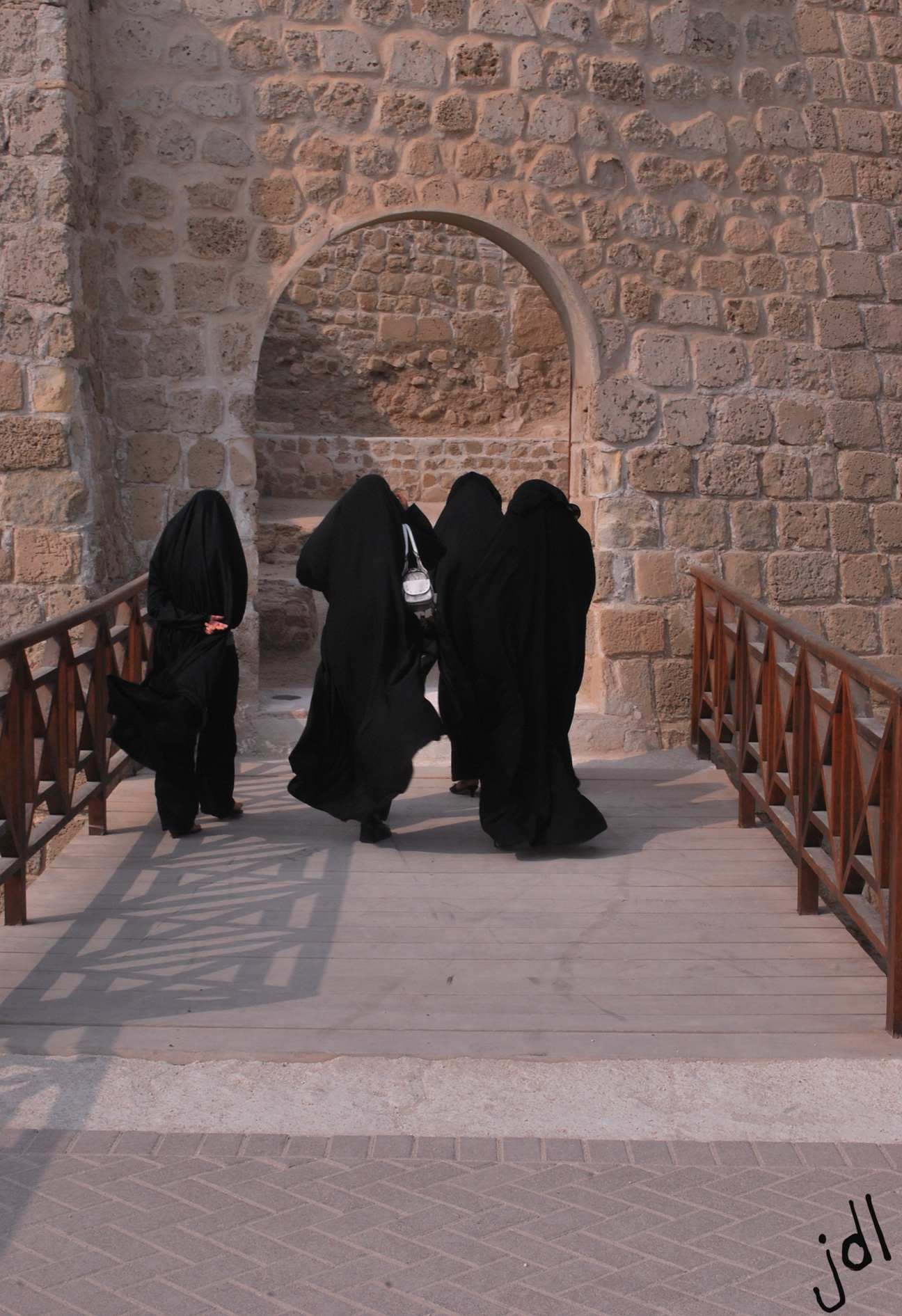
Four Bahraini women clad in black, seen from the back, walking towards a stone gate.

The traditional garments of women in Bahrain include the jellabiya, a long, loose dress, which is one of the preferred clothing styles for the home. Bahraini women may practice the muhtashima, partially covering the hair, or the muhajiba, fully covering the hair.

== Roles in society ==
In the past, such as in the 1960s, the roles of Bahraini women depended on the roles or jobs of their husbands. Women married to fishermen were expected to assist their husbands in their trade as fish cleaners and fish vendors. Women married to farmers were expected to act as farmland helpers and as produce marketers. In towns and cities, women were traditionally assigned to do the house chores and taking care of children. Wealthy Bahraini women, in general, would employ servants to perform their daily chores for them. In addition, women of Bahrain are renowned for their expertise in traditional textile embroidery. This talent of Bahraini women is a reflection of the Bahraini culture and heritage.

During the last thirty years or so, women in Bahrain have had opportunities to deviate from conventional female roles in society. They were able to expand their roles and achieve careers in the fields of education, medicine, nursing practice and other health-related jobs, financing, clerical jobs, light manufacturing, banking profession, and veterinary science, among others.

In Fact, Bahrain is the first GCC country to have women in high government rankings and roles, representing the government, such as ministers and ambassadors.

== Role models ==
One of the influences to Bahraini women's point of view regarding the importance of education and fashion trends were the group of American missionaries from Brunswick, New Jersey who arrived in Bahrain during the late 1890s, as well as early expatriate female teachers from Egypt and Lebanon. The first secular school for women in Bahrain, the Al-Khadija Al-Kubra, was established in 1928.

== Education ==
In 1928, according to Farouk Amin, Bahrain was the first Gulf state to have education for women.

In the 1950s, the first group of Bahraini women studied in Cairo, Egypt and Beirut, Lebanon to become teachers and school principals in Bahrain. The first hospital-based Nursing School in Bahrain was founded in 1959 with the opening of the College of Health Sciences gave opportunities for Bahraini women to practice as nurses. Women were able to study medicine and related fields in Jordan, Beirut, and Egypt. Women who did were able to profess as department heads, as deans of colleges and universities, and as professors.

Bahrain also was the first Gulf state to have social organizations for women in 1965. In 2005, the Royal University for Women (RUW) was the first private international university in Bahrain dedicated to educating the country's women.

== Women's rights ==
=== Political rights ===
In 2002, an amendment to the Constitution of Bahrain gave women in Bahrain the vote and the right to stand in national elections, the second country in the GCC to do so. Two years previously Mariam Al Jalahma, Bahia Al Jishi, Alees Samaan and Mona Al-Zayani had been the first four women appointed to the Consultative Council.

Women first voted and stood at municipal elections held in 2002, at which all 31 women running in a field of more than 300 candidates lost.

Also, no women were elected at the 2002 Bahraini general election. In response to the failure of women candidates, six were appointed to the Shura Council, which also includes representatives of the Kingdom's indigenous Jewish and Christian communities. Dr. Nada Haffadh became the country's first female cabinet minister on her appointment as Minister of Health in 2004.

The quasi-governmental women's group, the Supreme Council for Women, trained female candidates to take part in the 2006 Bahraini general election. In 2006, Lateefa Al Gaood became the first female MP after winning by default. The number rose to four after the 2011 by-elections.

When Bahrain was elected to head the United Nations General Assembly in 2006 it appointed lawyer and women's rights activist Haya bint Rashid Al Khalifa President of the United Nations General Assembly, only the third woman in history to head the world body. Female activist Ghada Jamsheer said "The government used women's rights as a decorative tool on the international level." She referred to the reforms as "artificial and marginal" and accused the government of "hinder[ing] non-governmental women societies". In 2008, Houda Nonoo was appointed ambassador to the United States making her the first Jewish ambassador of any Arab country. In 2011, Alice Samaan, a Christian woman was appointed ambassador to the United Kingdom.

At the 2014 Bahraini general election, a small number of women were elected to both houses.

=== Domestic violence ===
There are no laws in Bahrain to protect women against domestic violence.

== See also ==
- Be-Free
- Women's rights
- Women's rights in Bahrain
- Women in Islam
- Women in the Arab world
- Women in Asia
