= Arab Forum for Environment and Development =

International non-governmental organization

- المنتدى العربي للبيئة والتنمية
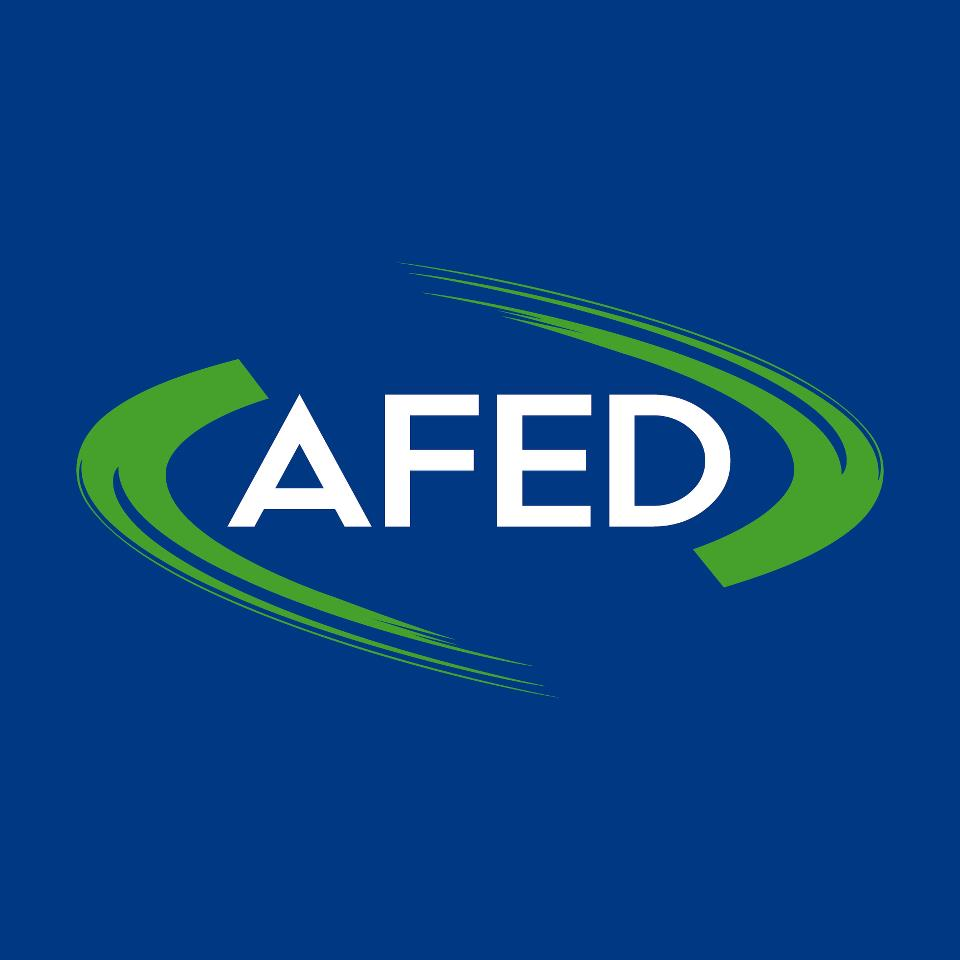

- Abbreviation: AFED
- Formation: 17 June 2006
- Type: Non-governmental Nonprofit regional/international organization
- Legal status: Active
- Purpose: Environmentalism, Development
- Headquarters: Beirut, Lebanon
- Region served: Arab world
- Secretary General: (Lebanon) Najib Saab
- Executive Committee Chairman: (Kuwait) Abdulrahman Al-Awadi
- Website: www.afedonline.org

The Arab Forum for Environment and Development (AFED) (Arabic: المنتدى العربي للبيئة والتنمية) is a not-for-profit regional non-governmental organization, membership-based organization headquartered in Beirut, Lebanon, with the status of international organization. It has been endorsed by the League of Arab States (LAS) and the United Nations Environment Programme (UNEP).

AFED was officially proclaimed in Beirut on 17 June 2006, at the conclusion of a regional conference on Public Opinion and the Environment, organized by Al-Bia Wal-Tanmia (Environment & Development magazine). The initiative, which started in 2001 by Al-Bia Wal-Tanmia publisher Najib Saab as an informal gathering of the magazine's region-wide readers, was established as a regional organization on the occasion of its tenth anniversary. AFED has subsequently earned the status of international non-governmental organization, with the associated amenities for its secretariat based in Beirut. Al-Bia Wal-Tanmia magazine became an organ of AFED as of January 2013, after Saab turned it over to the pan-Arab organization.

== Mission ==
Since 2007, AFED has been a public forum for eco-advocates. During six years, it has become a player in the environmental arena. AFED works towards bringing together parties concerned with environment and development in the Arab world to discuss regional and national issues related to the environment, in view of local and global changes, emphasizing the pivotal role of civil society and the private sector. It groups regional environmental organizations and experts with leading academic institutions, media and the business community, on common debate grounds to further the cause of environment and sustainable development.

The Forum, which cooperates with regional and international institutions, aims at spreading environmental awareness through promoting sensible information and education programmes, as well as supporting civil society organizations active in the environmental sector.

AFED aims at encouraging Arab societies to protect the environment and use natural resources in a sensible manner resulting in sustainable development. An independent periodic report on the State of Arab Environment (SAE) is yearly produced by AFED, to be presented to the General Assembly of the Forum. The annual forum is designed to attract participants from the private and public sectors, academia, experts, media and civil society.

== Goals ==
- Bringing together those concerned about environment and development in the Arab countries, to discuss problems in the light of changing regional and global conditions, and help addressing challenges, through appropriate policies.
- Motivating Arab societies to protect the environment, rationally utilize natural resources, and realize sustainable development goals, through positive interaction among policy makers, businessmen, academia, civil society, media, and other stakeholders.
- Propagating environmental awareness, by supporting environmental education and information and providing capacity building for civil society organizations.

== Course of action ==
AFED works to achieve its goals through the following course:

- Issuing a periodical report on the state of the environment and natural resources in the Arab world, with an emphasis on evaluating the progress towards the realization of sustainable development targets, as well as examining Arab contribution to global environmental endeavors.
- Convening regularly to discuss regional reports on environmental matters and to investigate their impact on the process of sustainable development in the Arab world, with subsidiary meetings to discuss issues of special concern or specific sub-regional problems.
- Working with the business community in the Arab world to develop a Corporate Environmental Responsibility Programme, adopt sustainable practices and move towards cleaner production technologies.
- Encouraging scientific research on current and emerging environmental issues in the Arab world.
- Cooperating with the media and the advertising sectors to promote environmental awareness through various tools.
- Working with educational institutions, universities, and research centres towards the development of environmental education programmes at all levels, both for promoting constructive environmental behavior and attitudes, and building up capacities in the domains of environmental sciences and management.
- Supporting networking of NGOs active in the domain of environment and development and coordinating joint programmes among them.

== Governance ==
The Arab Forum for Environment and Development is governed by a Board of Trustees, representing environmental experts alongside business, media, and civil society leaders. The Board of Trustees elects an Executive Committee that includes a Chairman, Vice Chairman, Secretary General, Treasurer and members. It also appoints honorary members and an external auditor. It meets annually to decide on AFED policies, programs, and budget. The executive committee oversees the overall management of AFED, including programs and finance, and meets at least twice a year. Responsibility for the daily management of AFED lies with the Secretary General, assisted by a core secretariat.

== Funding ==
AFED funds come from:

- Membership fees
- Contributions to AFED Endowment
- Sponsorship by corporate partners and organizations
- Income from activities and services

As a not-for-profit organization, any surplus capital is invested in new initiatives or existing programs.

== Membership ==
Prospective members and observers must submit their applications to AFED Executive Committee, which will consider each case according to the set criteria. Membership continues as long as a member meets the criteria and pays the annual dues. AFED membership is open to all those committed to the goals of sustainable development in Arab countries. The main requirement is acceptance and adoption of AFED mission statement, and commitment to help achieve AFED goals. AFED provides a platform to address and reach a wider audience, in public and private sectors, while allowing networking, exchange of expertise, and exposure to similar initiatives around the world.

AFED membership is institutional In five years, 110 institutional members joined AFED, including: 40 corporate members, 24 NGOs including one political Green party, 12 universities and research centers, 24 media organizations, and 10 government agencies as observers.

=== Membership categories ===
==== Corporate ====
Businesses active in the Arab region, which are willing to advocate, promote, and adopt policies of sustainable development.

==== Media ====
Broadcast and print media which commit to promoting public awareness of environmental issues and furthering of the AFED mission

==== NGOs ====
Representing grassroots leadership in mobilizing the public to support environmental causes, as well as advising and pressuring the public sector on these issues.

==== Academic and research institutions ====
Offering educational and research programs related to various aspects of environment and sustainable development.

==== Observers ====
National, regional, and international governmental and inter-governmental bodies, whose mandates cover environment and sustainable development issues.

== Annual reports ==
AFED released seven reports covering environmental issues in the Arab world:

- AFED Report 2008 "Arab Environment 1: Future Challenges"
- AFED Report 2009 "Arab Environment 2: Climate Change, Impact of Climate Change on Arab Countries"
- AFED Report 2010 "Arab Environment 3: Water, Sustainable Management of a Scarce Resource"
- AFED Report 2011 "Arab Environment 4: Green Economy, Sustainable Transition in a Changing Arab World"
- AFED Report 2012 "Arab Environment 5: Survival Options, Ecological Footprint of Arab Countries"
- AFED Report 2013 "Arab Environment 6: Sustainable Energy – Prospects, Challenges, Opportunities"
- AFED Report 2014 "Arab Environment 7: Food Security"
- AFED Report 2015 "Arab Environment 8: Sustainable Consumption"
- AFED Report 2016 "Arab Environment 9: sustainable Development in a Changing Arab Climate"
- AFED Report 2017 "Arab Environment 10: Arab Environment in 10 Years"
- AFED Report 2018 "Arab Environment 11: Financing Sustainable Development in Arab Countries"

AFED's expert-written, policy oriented annual reports have become the main reference on the state of Arab environment. Findings and recommendations have been endorsed by national and regional bodies. Alongside the original Arabic and English editions, the reports were translated into other languages, including Japanese and Spanish. AFED's reports can be downloaded from AFED website.

== Annual conventions ==
The most recent AFED convention, held in Sharjah, UAE, in October 2013, brought together over 600 delegates from the public and private sectors, scientists, civil society and media, who engaged in an open debate on Sustainable Energy in the Arab region. The 2012 convention, in Beirut, tackled Survival Options and Ecological Footprint. The 2011 convention discussed Green Economy, while the 2010 convention debated AFED's report Water: Sustainable Management of a Scarce Resource. The 2009 convention discussed the impact of climate change on Arab countries. The first 2008 convention in Bahrain tackled future environmental challenges. All AFED conventions issue recommendations for action, which are discussed with governments and other stakeholders, and in many cases have contributed to changes in national policies.

== AFED activities ==
=== AFED Mag ===
AFED and ‘’Al-Bia Wal-Tanmia’’ (Environment and Development magazine) launched, in March 2013, the first comprehensive online environmental portal in Arabic, making over 35,000 pages of references freely available to readers and researchers. The domain includes a full archive of the magazine contents during the past 18 years. The website is updated daily with news, information and commentaries. The domain's name www.afedmag.com (AFED magazine) reflects a new epoch of the magazine, which became an organ of AFED as of January 2013, after its publisher Najib Saab turned it over to the pan-Arab organization.

=== AFED documentaries ===
AFED produced six documentaries.

- The latest, "Powering Arab Future", summarized AFED report on Sustainable Energy, and was shown during ESCWA Renewable Energy Conference in Morocco, 2013.
- "That They May Have Life", discussed Ecological Footprint and the right of future generations to natural resources.
- "Green Change" was launched at AFED's 2011 annual convention.
- A documentary on water scarcity in the Arab world, entitled "The Last Drop", was screened in its third annual conference in November 2010, and broadcast in Cancun Summit and on several Arab televisions networks.
- Its 2009 "Wet and Dry" documentary on climate change was broadcast more than 450 times on national and regional television networks.
- The earlier "Testimony of an Old Man" in 2008 was broadcast 600 times, and over 6000 DVDs were distributed to schools, civil society organizations, business executives, and governments.

AFED continues to support the capacity building initiatives of its member NGOs, as well as its awareness campaigns, school competitions, and training of journalists.

=== Environmental education ===
AFED has developed a comprehensive environmental education program, supported by a wide-ranging handbook. It provides material needed to initiate environment activities at schools and incorporate environment in the curricula. Each of the 2 topics is supported by graphics, posters, documentaries, songs and plays, all available online. AFED program includes developing curricula at the national levels and teacher training workshops.

=== Arab Green Economy Initiative ===
In May 2009, AFED launched the Arab Green Economy Initiative (AGEI), designed to facilitate the transition of governments and businesses to more environment-friendly practices. The AGEI covers: Public Policy Recommendations, Economics of Eco-system Investing, Corporate Environmental Responsibility (CER), New Business Workshops, Sustainability Reporting, and Web-based Consumer Education. AFED carried out workshops for stakeholders in seven Arab countries to kick-start the AGEI program and select priorities. The 2011 AFED report Green Economy: Sustainable Transition in a Changing Arab World was one component of the initiative. Other components are 2 handbooks which AFED produced and are in use across the region, on:

- Water Efficiency, which is a practical guide, providing tips on achieving better sensible use of water in buildings.
- Energy Efficiency, which is designed to help better environmental housekeeping in office buildings.

In January 2012, the UAE announced its national initiative «Green Economy for Sustainable Development".

=== Corporate environmental responsibility ===
AFED launched its corporate environmental responsibility (CER) initiative in Abu Dhabi, on 29 November 2007, at the conclusion of the Arab CER Summit, organized by AFED and Environment Agency Abu Dhabi (EAD). Over 120 CEOs, representing major business sectors from across the Arab world, have committed to advance the principles of environmental responsibility and cleaner production, and set a target to reduce energy and water consumption by 20% in their operations by 2012. The CER program works with business enterprises to institutionalize environmental thinking and action in corporate decision making. It also aims at developing a comprehensible roadmap for navigating a transition to environmental responsibility, by integrating environmental goals more effectively into core business operations and strategy.

=== Cooperation with organizations ===
AFED has contributed to over 200 regional and international meetings, reports and programs. Its reports, recommendations and initiatives have been discussed and considered at high-level regional and international meetings, including UNEP, the Council of Arab Ministers Responsible for Environment (CAMRE), the World Bank, ESCWA and ILO. AFED gained observer status with UNFCCC, UNEP and LAS.

== Quotations ==
- José María Figueres

Former President of Costa Rica and Chairman of the Carbon War Room

"The report which has been put out by AFED constitutes a very good footprint for action. And action it is what we are convened to undertake in the world of today."

== AFED structure ==
=== Secretariat ===
- (Lebanon) Najib Saab - Secretary General

=== Executive committee ===
- (Kuwait) Dr. Abdulrahman Al-Awadi - chairman
- (Lebanon) Mr. Najib Saab - secretary general
- (Jordan) (Kuwait) Mr. Samer Younis - chairman, Development and Fundraising Committee
- (Lebanon) (United Arab Emirates) Mr. Adonis Nasr - treasurer
- (Lebanon) (United Arab Emirates) Mr. Maroun Semaan - member
- (Lebanon) (United Arab Emirates) Mr. Nabil Habayeb - member

=== Board of trustees ===
==== Founding members ====
- Dr. Adnan Badran, Jordan Former PM, President of Petra University (chairman)
- (Kuwait) Dr. Abdulrahman Al-Awadi, Executive Secretary, Regional Organization for the Protection of Marine Environment (ROPME), Former Minister of Health
- (Lebanon) Mr. Najib Saab, Publisher and Editor-in-Chief, Al-Bia Wal-Tanmia magazine, Architect
- (Saudi Arabia) Mr. Suleiman Jasir Al-Herbish, Director General, OPEC Fund for International Development (OFID)
- Mr. Saad Hariri, Lebanon MP, former PM, Businessman
- (United Arab Emirates) Mr. Mohammed Al-Bawardi, chairman of the executive committee, Executive Council of Abu Dhabi
- (Sudan) Mr. Salih Osman, former assistant executive director, United Nations Environment Programme (UNEP)
- (Bahrain) Dr. Riyad Hamzah, secretary general, Higher Education Council, Former Vice President, the Arabian Gulf University
- (Lebanon) (United Arab Emirates) Mr. Maroun Semaan, president, Petrofac International

==== Founding honorary members ====
- (Egypt) Dr. Mostafa Kamal Tolba, former executive director, UNEP (former chairman of the board)
- (Qatar) Mr. Abdulrahman Al-Attiyah, former secretary general, Gulf Cooperation Council (GCC)
- (Saudi Arabia) Mr. Abdulmohsen Al-Sudeary, former president, International Fund for Agricultural Development (IFAD)

==== Members ====
- (Egypt) (United States) Dr. Mohamed El-Ashry, former CEO, Global Environment Facility (Vice Chairman)
- Mr. Ahmad Al-Noaimi, managing director, Ibtikar, Former CEO, Aluminium Bahrain (ALBA)
- (Lebanon) (United Arab Emirates) Mr. Nabil Habayeb, president and CEO-Middle East-North Africa-Turkey, General Electric International Inc.
- (Jordan) (Kuwait) Mr. Samer Younis, vice chairman and managing director, Kharafi National
- (Iraq) (United Arab Emirates) Mr. Majid Jafar, CEO, Crescent Petroleum
- (Lebanon) (United Arab Emirates) Mr. Adonis Nasr, CEO, Academia Management Solutions International (AMSI)
- (Lebanon) (Bahrain) Mr. Akram Miknas, chairman, Fortune Promoseven Holdings
- (Saudi Arabia) Mr. Rami Alturki, president, Alturki Group
- (Bahrain) Dr. Mansoor Al-Jamri, editor-in-chief, Al-Wasat Newspaper
- Dr. Saif Al-Hajari, vice chairman, Qatar Foundation
- (Morocco) Dr. Asma El-Kasmi, UNESCO chair, Water, Women and Decision
- Dr. Adnan Shihab-Eldin, director general, Kuwait Foundation for the Advancement of Sciences (KFAS)
- (Jordan) Mr. Khaled Irani, former minister, president, the Royal Society for the Conservation of Nature
