= Riyad Hamzah =

Bahraini academic

- رياض يوسف حمزة

President of the Royal University for Women
- In office 2024–Present

President of the University of Bahrain
- In office 2016–2021

Secretary General of the Higher Education Council
- In office 2011–2016

Personal details
- Education: PhD in Biochemistry, University of Houston; BSc in Biology, University of Houston
- Occupation: Professor of Biochemistry and Biotechnology from Arabian Gulf University, from 1985 - 2011
- Awards: 2011 - Medal of Highest Distinction by His Majesty King Hamad bin Isa Al Khalifa 1997 - Award for Bahrain Pioneers of the 20th Century by His Highness Shaikh Isa bin Salman Al Khalifa, the late Amir of Bahrain 1974, 1979 and 1984 - Award of Distinction by His Highness Shaikh Isa bin Salman Al Khalifa, the late Amir of Bahrain

Riyad Yousif Hamzah (Arabic: رياض يوسف حمزة) is an internationally recognized Bahraini academic that has led several higher education institutions and is a leading Professor of Biotechnology. He currently serves as the President of the Royal University for Women, and previously served as the seventh President of the University of Bahrain.

== Early life and education ==
Hamzah received his PhD in Biochemistry (Enzymology emphasis) from the University of Houston in 1984.

== Career ==
In 1985, Hamzah joined Arabian Gulf University (AGU) in Manama, the capital of his homeland, where he would go on to hold many leadership positions, including Director-General for Financial and Administrative Affairs from 1986 to 1994. In 1987, he established the AGU Biotechnology Program, the first in the Arab world. He was appointed Dean of the Faculty of Applied Sciences in 1990, serving in that office until 1994. He was then promoted to the Vice-Presidency of AGU, an office he held from 1994 to 2005.

In 1995, Hamzah was appointed AGU's Professor of Environmental Biotechnology. He would also be appointed to the Higher Education Council, a division of the Ministry of Education. In 2011, King Hamad bin Isa Al Khalifa appointed him Secretary-General of the council, a position tantamount to Undersecretary at the Ministry.

Hamzah's research focuses on biotech applications, including the biodegradation of chemical pollutants (particularly petroleum and its derivatives) and bacterial sulfur removal. He has supervised many master's and doctoral dissertations and has published many scientific papers in international and regional scientific journals. He has organized and participated in numerous regional and international conferences, sometimes giving lectures there.

King Hamad issued Decree No. 20 in 2016, appointing Hamzah President of the University of Bahrain for a four-year term. In 2018, the Business Incubator Centre was founded to help students, employees, and partners start their own businesses rather than relying on jobs in institutions, ministries, and companies. He described the launch as follows:

Today we all celebrate this center, which is a starting point for private projects based on scientific and administrative studies, crystallized for a new future full of ambition, achievement, and innovation for entrepreneurs.

== Publications ==
He co-edited the 2001 book, التخطيط الوطني للتنوع البيولوجي في الوطن العربي (“National Biodiversity Planning in the Arab World”).
