= Jehad Al Fadhel =

Bahraini media personality

Jehad Abdullah Muhammad Al Fadhel (Arabic: جهاد الفاضل) is a Bahraini media personality and politician. She was appointed to the Consultative Council in 2012.

== Career ==
Al Fadhel earned a Bachelor of Arts in English Literature with an emphasis on Translation from the University of Bahrain (UB) in 2001, a Master of Arts in English Linguistics from the same school in 2004, a Doctorate in Media with an emphasis on Journalism from the University of Bedfordshire in 2009, and a Postgraduate Certificate in Higher Education as a joint program between the UB and York St John University in 2011.

Al Fadhel worked as a learning resource specialist in the UB Department of English Language and Literature, earning promotions to teaching and resource assistant in the Department of Media, Tourism, and Fine Arts in 2003, assistant professor there in 2009, and finally Executive Director of the Department of Public Relations and Media in 2011. She was appointed to the Consultative Council or Shura Council in 2012, succeeding Sameera bint Ibrahim Rajab upon the latter's appointment as Minister of State for Information.

In December 2022 she was appointed Second Deputy Chairman of the Shura Council.

In February 2024, she was elected chair of the Parliamentary Network of Women Parliamentarians in Africa and the Arab World.

== Awards ==
- Certificate of Appreciation from the UNESCO Regional Bureau for Education in Beirut (2011)
