= Khalil Al Thawadi =

Bahraini politician

Khalil Ibrahim Mohammed Al Thawadi (Arabic: خليل إبراهيم محمد الذوادي, January 1, 1949 (age 77)) is a Bahraini politician.

== Biography ==
Born in the village of Budaiya, Al Thawadi earned a Bachelor of Arts in Arabic language and Islamic studies from Kuwait University in 1972 and Diplomas in Advanced Management and Executive Management from the University of Bahrain in 1993. serving as Bahrain’s ambassador to Egypt until 2010 with non-resident duties in Sudan from 2005. He was appointed to the Consultative Council.

== Awards ==
- Order of Sheikh Isa bin Salman Al Khalifa, second class
