= Jassim Al Muawda =

Bahraini footballer

Jassim al Muawda
Personal information
- Date of birth: November 25, 1936
- Place of birth: Muharraq, Bahrain
- Date of death: May 16, 2017 (aged 80)

Managerial career
- Years: Team
- 1956—1958: Al-Muharraq SC
- 1956—1974: Al-Ahli
- 1958—1966: Bahrain national football team

Jassim Salman Al Muawda (Arabic: جاسم سلمان المعاودة, November 25, 1936 – May 16, 2017) was a Bahraini educator, association football player and coach, musician, and singer.

== Biography ==
=== Early life ===
Al Muawda was born in the Sheikh Abdullah neighborhood of Muharraq. In 1944, he and his sister Latifa to become Hafiz (memorizers of the Quran), then in 1946, he enrolled at the Al-Hidaya Al-Khalifia Boys School. From 1947 to his graduation in 1954, he studied at Victoria College, Alexandria, Egypt.

=== Education ===
In 1956, on the recommendation of diplomat and Scouting Movement pioneer Saif bin Jabr Al-Musallam, Al Muawda was hired by the Ministry of Education to teach physical education and English. Among his most prominent students were Ministers Tariq Al-Moayad, Ibrahim Abdul Karim, Habib Ahmed Qassem, Ghazi Abdul Rahman Al Gosaibi, painter Abdullah Al Muharraqi, poet Abdul Rahman Rafii, and politician Muhammad Al-Khalifat. He left the teaching profession in 1957.

=== Athletic career ===
In 1955, Al Muawda joined Al-Muharraq SC as a player. For the 1956-1957 and 1957–1958 seasons, he simultaneously coached Al-Muharraq and Al-Ahli Club and led Al-Muharraq to two Bahraini Premier League championships, while both teams reached the finals of the Bahraini King's Cup in 1958 with Al-Muharraq the victor. In 1958, a dispute with the president of Al-Muharraq, Sheikh Ali bin Muhammad Al Khalifa, led Al Muawda to resign and move to Al-Nasr SC, which would win the 1959-1960 Premier League Championship, ending Al-Muharraq]’s five-year winning streak.

In 1958, Al Muawda founded a permanent referee committee for national championships with Ali Kamanja, Abdullah Hamza, Hamza Ali Mirza, Faisal Al Alawi, and Muhammad Taqi. Al Muawda also coached starting in the 1950s for several local teams; he served as the first coach of the Bahrain national football team from 1958 to 1966. The team fought its first official match at the Arab Nations Cup in 1966 to a draw with Kuwait before losing three matches to Lebanon, Iraq, and Jordan. He stayed with Al-Ahli until 1976. Nicknamed the Sheikh of Bahraini trainers, he was also the first physiotherapist in the country, played basketball and volleyball in addition to football, served on the Board of Directors of Al-Ahli, and was close to many foreign sports figures and federations.

=== Musical career ===
After he retiring from sports as a player, he formed a band with Issa Ghuloom, Mahdi Zakaria, and Muhammad Salman. Changing its name each week, the band featured Al Muawda on keyboard, guitar, and lead vocals.

== Achievements ==
=== Al-Muharraq SC ===
- Bahrain Premier League Championship (2): 1957, 1958
- Bahraini King's Cup (1): 1958

=== Al-Ahli Club ===
- Bahrain Premier League Championship (2): 1969, 1972
- Bahraini King's Cup (1): 1960, 1968

== Death ==
Al Muawda died on May 16, 2017, and was buried in Muharraq Cemetery the following day.

== Legacy ==
On March 28, 2019, Nasser bin Hamad Al Khalifa, representative of the King of Bahrain for Charitable Works and Youth Affairs, Chairman of the Supreme Council for Youth and Sports, and Chairman of the Bahrain Olympic Committee decided to name the Al-Ahli Club's new gymnasium after Al Muawda.

== Personal life ==
His aunt Thabija bint Jassim Al Muawda is married to Abdullah bin Isa Al Khalifa, brother of King Hamad bin Isa Al Khalifa.
