= Susan E Saxton =

Susan E. Saxton is an American entrepreneur and educational strategist. She is currently serving as the founding president of the American University of Bahrain (AUBH).

== Academic career ==
In 1999, Saxton was appointed as founding dean of the school of business and technology for Capella University. In 2002, she served as dean of the college of eLearning, a start-up division at Lynn University. In 2004, Saxton joined Kaplan University as the vice president of strategy and product development and dean of students.

Saxton joined Laureate Education Inc. in 2006, a private company. During her first six years at Laureate, she held several roles, including dean, College of Education at Walden University; senior vice president of product management; senior vice president of product strategy, innovation and development; chief academic officer; and chief strategy officer. In 2012 Saxton relocated to The Hague, Netherlands, where she was appointed as the chief strategy and development officer for the International Baccalaureate Organization. In 2015, Saxton assumed the role of senior vice president of innovation and emerging strategies and subsequently became the chief executive officer at the University of St. Augustine for Health Sciences, an acquisition of Laureate Education.

Saxton was appointed as the founding president of the American University of Bahrain in 2019. In December of that year, she was invited to be one of the award panelists for the fourth edition of Tamkeen's Bahrain Award for Entrepreneurship.
