= Mohamed Ali Hasan Ali =

Bahraini politician

Member of the Consultative Council
- Incumbent
- Assumed office 14 December 2014

Personal details
- Born: Sar, Bahrain
- Children: 3
- Education: University of Bahrain; University of East Anglia

Mohamed Ali Hasan Ali (Arabic: محمد علي حسن علي) is a Bahraini politician who is currently a Member of the Consultative Council.

He was educated at the University of Bahrain (BSc Chemistry and Physics, 1983) and the University of East Anglia (MSc Chemical and Environmental Sciences, 1987; PhD, 1994).
