= Be Free =

Be Free may refer to:

== Music ==
- Be Free (festival), Belarusian rock festival

=== Songs ===
- "Be Free", a song by Loggins & Messina from Mother Lode (1974)
- "Be Free" (song), a 2005 song by Belinda Peregrín
- "Be Free", a song by Aero Chord and electronic trio Klaypex (2015)
- "Be Free", a song by Elán from album London Express (2005)
- "Be Free", a song by Greeeen from Ā, Domo. Ohisashiburi Desu. (2008)
- "Be Free", a song by J. Cole recorded during the 2014 Forest Hills Drive era (2014)
- "Be Free", a song by TRF (1998)
- "Be Free", a song by Ten City (2021)
- "Be Free", a song by Black Eyed Peas from Behind the Front (1998)

== Other ==
- Be-Free, a Bahraini non-profit a program concerned with the protection of children and teenagers
- beFree, Inc., online advertising company now part of CJ Affiliate
- "Be Free", an episode from the sixth season of Orange Is the New Black (2018)
