= List of medical schools in Bahrain =

There are two medical schools in Bahrain, one of which is public and another one is private.

== Public medical schools ==
School	Location	Degrees	Established
College of Medicine and Medical Sciences, Arabian Gulf University	Manama	M.D in Medicine. Diploma and MSc in Laboratory Medicine, Health Professions Education, Health Policy and Population Studies. Doctorate in Molecular Medicine. -	1980

== Private medical schools ==
School	Location	Degrees	Established
Royal College of Surgeons in Ireland - Bahrain	Busaiteen	MB BCh BAO in Medicine. BSc in Nursing	2004
