= Kingdom University =

Coordinates: 26.1360°N 50.5834°E

Kingdom University (KU) is a private university in Bahrain offering tertiary education and training. It was founded in 2001.

== Brief History ==
Kingdom University obtained its license in 2001, though it started student intake only in 2004 on a temporary campus that was located in Manama. In July 2013, the university moved to its new permanent campus in Riffa (Al-Hajiyat), Bahrain. The new campus provides a fresh and promising learning environment and study facilities. In 2016, the university embarked on a significant expansion which includes the development of a new six-story academic building and an extension of car parks.

The university began in 2004 with approximately 67 students. It has rapidly grown since then to reach more than 1800 alumni by the end of 2015 from the different colleges (Law, Arts, Business Administration, IT, & Architectural Engineering & Design).

Kingdom University received recognition from the Quality Assurance Authority for Education and Training (QAAET) for almost all of its programs.

The university president is Prof. Hassan Alhajhouj since January 2022.

== Colleges ==
- College of Law
- College of Architectural Engineering and Design
- College of Business Administration

== Certificates Granted by Kingdom University ==
=== Associate Diploma ===
All colleges and majors except the College of Architectural Engineering and Design

=== Bachelors Degree ===
- Bachelor of Law
- Bachelor of Architectural Engineering
- Bachelor of Interior Design
- Bachelor of Business Administration
- Bachelor of Finance and Banking
- Bachelor of Finance and Accounting (ACCA Accredited)

== Recognition & Student Achievements ==
Among Kingdom University awards are the following:

- First Prize and Third Prize in the Architectural Contest for the Schools of Architecture among universities in the Persian Gulf region for designing the mosque in 2009
- The university was awarded the e-Government Excellence Award in 2010
- First Prize: Shaikh Nasser Award in the category of Architecture Design in 2011 (College of Architectural Engineering and Design)
- First Prize: Shaikh Nasser Award in the category of Photography in 2011 (College of Architectural Engineering and Design)
- First Prize Debate Contest organized by Ministry of Youth & Sports Bahrain in 2012

On-Campus Activities:

- First Prize in Student Camping Bahrain 2008
- First Prize in the Football Championship at the University Level in 2009- Bahrain Organized by NYIT
- First Prize in Football Championships at the level of all Universities in Bahrain 2010
- Photo Gallery Exhibition conducted by Kingdom University in 2009. Proceeds of the exhibition is being donated for the benefit of the citizens of Gaza
- Exhibition conducted in Kuwait by the Kingdom University for International Exhibition for Education in March 2009.
- Exhibition conducted by the Kingdom University for Interior Designing in 2009
- First Prize in the Bowling Championship at the University Level in 2011
- First Prize in Bowling Championship at the University Level in 2012

== See also ==
- List of universities in Bahrain
