= Arab Network for Quality Assurance in Higher Education =

Arab Network for Quality Assurance in Higher Education الشبكة العربية لضمان الجودة في التعليم العالي
- Formation: 2007
- Type: Non-profit
- Purpose: Quality assurance
- Headquarters: Cairo (Egypt)
- President: Nadia Badrawi
- Vice-President: Badr Aboul-Ela
- Secretary General: Tariq M. Al-Sindi
- Website: Official website

The Arab Network for Quality Assurance in Higher Education (ANQAHE) was established in 2007 as a nonprofit nongovernmental organization.

The purpose of ANQAHE is to establish an international Arab network for quality assurance in higher education and to facilitate exchange of information and disseminate best practice in quality assurance; develop and support quality assurance agencies according to appropriate standards; and strengthen links between existing quality agencies across national borders.

ANQAHE works in association with the International Network of Quality Assurance Agencies in Higher Education and in connection with the Association of Arab Universities. It is based in Cairo, Egypt and its secretary general is Dr Tariq Alsindi.

The member organizations of ANQAHE are:

- Accreditation and Quality Assurance Commission (AQAC), Ministry of Education and Higher Education, Ramallah, Palestine
- Center for Quality assurance and accreditation for higher education institutions, Tripoli, Libya
- Commission for Academic Accreditation, Ministry of Higher Education, Abu Dhabi, United Arab Emirates
- Evaluation and Accreditation Commission (EVAC), Ministry of Higher Education, Sudan
- Higher Education Accreditation Commission, Amman, Jordan
- National Commission for Academic Accreditation & Assessment, Riyadh, Saudi Arabia
- Oman Academic Accreditation Authority, Muscat, Oman
- Private Universities Council, Safat, Kuwait
- Quality Assurance Authority for Education and Training (QAAET), Manama, Bahrain
- National Authority for Quality Assurance and Accreditation of Education (NAQAAE), Nasr City, Egypt
