= List of chairmen of the Consultative Council of Bahrain =

List of chairmen of the Consultative Council of Bahrain.

This is a list of chairmen (speakers) of the Consultative Council of Bahrain:

Name	Entered office	Left office	Notes
Dr. Faisal Al-Mousawi	14 December 2002	2006	
Ali Saleh Al-Saleh	15 December 2006	Incumbent	
