= Bahrain Institute of Banking and Finance =

- معهد البحرين للدراسات المصرفية والمالية
- Type: Semi-public
- Established: 1981; 45 years ago
- Director: Ahmed Abdul Hameed Al Shaikh
- Location: Manama, Bahrain
- Website: Official website

The Bahrain Institute of Banking and Finance (Arabic: معهد البحرين للدراسات المصرفية والمالية, abbreviated as BIBF) is a semi-governmental higher education institute situated in the Bahrain Bay district of Manama, in the Kingdom of Bahrain. Founded in 1981 as the Bahrain Bankers Training Centre, it is affiliated with the Central Bank of Bahrain and offers more than 400 various training courses in banking, accounting, Islamic finance, insurance, information technology and marketing.

BIBF is largely responsible for the Bahrainization of the finance sector in the country. It is affiliated with Bangor University, the University of London and the Chartered Institute for Marketing.

== History ==
Since the institute's inception, it has trained over 100,000 students throughout its various courses.

== Facilities ==
The BIBF campus was formerly located in Juffair, an eastern district of the Bahraini capital Manama. The former campus consisted of a building with 26 classrooms and 4 computer laboratories. Additionally, the campus hosted a Pearson VUE assessment centre, an 80-seat seminar room, a student lounge and a cafe.

BIBF began moving its facilities and faculty to its new campus in Bahrain Bay in late 2021. The move was made official on 22 January 2022 with an opening ceremony inaugurated by the Crown Prince of Bahrain Shaikh Salman bin Hamad Al Khalifa. The new building spans an area of 25,000 square metres and consist of 9 separate floors, 50 lecture halls, 5 computer laboratories, a simulated dealing room which mimics real-time trading, and an auditorium with a capacity of 300 students. The new campus was designed by Gulf House Engineering. It also includes a library with an estimated collection of 3,000 books, a student lounge and cafe.

== See also ==
- List of universities in Bahrain
