= Abdullah bin Isa Al Khalifa =

Abdullah bin Isa bin Ali Al Khalifa
- الشيخ عبد الله بن عيسى بن علي آل خليفة
- Born: 1883; Manama, Bahrain
- Died: April 23, 1966 (aged 82–83)
- Occupations: politician, judge
- Family: House of Khalifa

Sheikh Abdullah bin Isa bin Ali Al Khalifa (Arabic: الشيخ عبد الله بن عيسى بن على ال خليفة, born in 1883, Manama, Bahrain, died in 1966) was a Bahraini politician, Cabinet Minister, and judge.

== Biography ==
He was born the son of Sheikh Isa ibn Ali Al Khalifa in Manama in 1883 and raised by his father with private tutors to educate him. When the municipality of Manama was founded in 1919, Sheikh Abdullah bin Isa was the first president of the municipal council, chairing it until 1929. He established the first regular schools in the country, including the first girls’ school in 1926 to the consternation of some conservatives. He began sending students on scholarship abroad in 1928 and was appointed the first Minister of Education in 1931. Appointed in 1938 as chief judge of the Court of Cassation that also included future Emir of Bahrain Sheikh Salman bin Hamad Al Khalifa I and Chief Adviser Charles Belgrave, Abdullah also replaced his brother Mohammed as mayor of Muharraq, widening streets and improving markets among other reforms. He was an avid falconer and went on many hunting trips in Saudi Arabia. He died on April 23, 1966.

== Personal life ==
1- Shaikha Haya bint Salman bin Du’aij Al Khalifa (the mother of Shaikh Mohamed and Shaikha Maryam)

2-Shaikha Noora bint Hamad bin Mohamed Al Khalifa (the mother of Shaikh Rashid)

3-Shaikha Lulwa bint Ahmed bin Ali Al Khalifa (the mother of Shaikh Ali and Shaikha Noora)

4-Shaikha Muneera bint Abdulla Al Khalifa (the mother of Shaikh Hamad)

5-Shaikha Qadnana Al Sada (the mother of Shaikha Nayla, Shaikha Hussa, and Shaikha Shaikha)

6-Thajba Al Mu’awda (no descendants)

7-Suheila Al Buflasa (no descendants)
