= Ghada Jamshir =

Bahraini women's rights activist

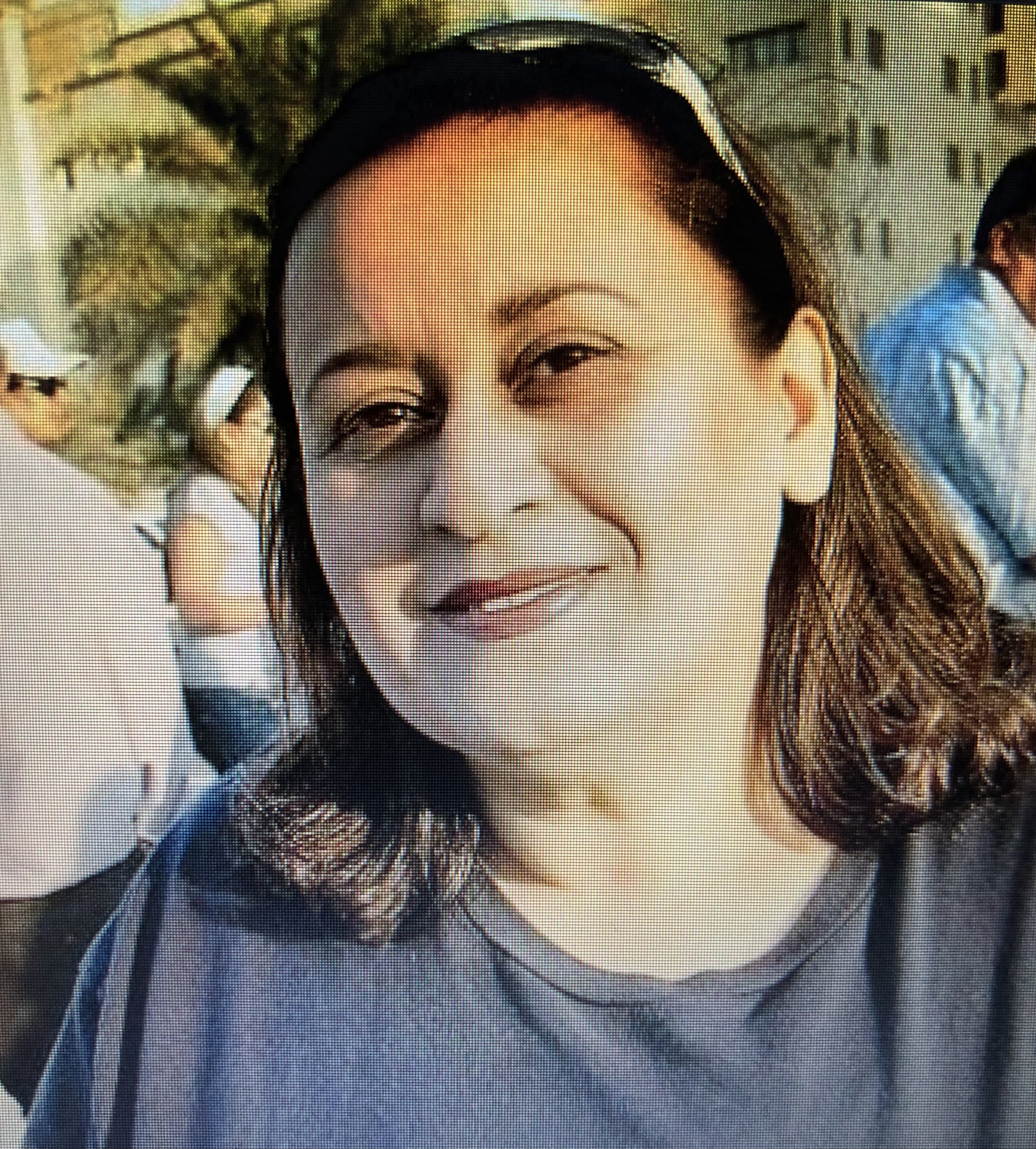
Ghada Jamshir

Ghada Jamshir (Arabic: غادة جمشير) is a Bahraini women's rights activist and an ardent campaigner for the reform of Sharia courts in Bahrain and the Arab States of the Persian Gulf. Jamshir heads the Women's Petition Committee lobbying for a law that would shift jurisdiction over family and women's affairs from Islamic Sharia court to civil courts.

Jamshir has called the Al Khalifa government's reforms "artificial and marginal". In a statement in December 2006 she said,

The government is using the family law issue as a bargaining tool with opposition Islamic groups. This is evident through the fact that the authorities raise this issue when ever they want to distract attention from other controversial political issues. While no serious steps are taken to help approve this law, although the government and its puppet National Assembly had no trouble in the last four years when it came to approving restrictive laws related to basic freedoms. All of this is why no one in Bahrain believes in government clichés and government institution like the High Council for Women. The government used women's rights as a decorative tool on the international level. While the High Council for Women was used to hinder non-governmental women societies and to block the registration of the Women Union for many years. Even when the union was recently registered, it was restricted by the law on societies.

Jamshir has been outspoken in criticizing the Bahraini government for its role in the Bandargate scandal. In 2007 she alleged that the Interior Ministry was attempting to spy on her.

== Backlash by the government ==
In 2005, the Bahraini government brought three criminal charges against Jamshir for allegedly publicly defaming the Islamic family court judiciary, and faced a jail sentence of up to 15 years. These charges were eventually dropped on 19 June 2005.

Since 2006, Ghada Jamsheer has been under permanent surveillance, there is a 24-hour presence of plainclothes public security officials of the Ministry of the Interior outside her home.

After her criticism of government policies, Bahrain authorities ordered the local media and press to prevent the publication of any news relating to Jamshir. The order came from the Royal Court, through its minister Shaikh Khalid bin Ahmed Al Khalifa. Jamshir also claims that the Minister of the Royal Court gave her a direct threat demanding that she end her public work, after which the regime attempted to install a spy camera in her house, bugged her telephone, and sent individuals to bribe and blackmail her.

In 2006, Time magazine identified Jamshir as one of four heroes of freedom in the Arab world, and Forbes magazine selected her as one of the ten most powerful and effective women in the Arab world.

== See also ==
- Human rights in Bahrain
- Women's political rights in Bahrain
