= Sawsan Kamal =

Bahraini politician and clinical psychologist

- سوسن كمال
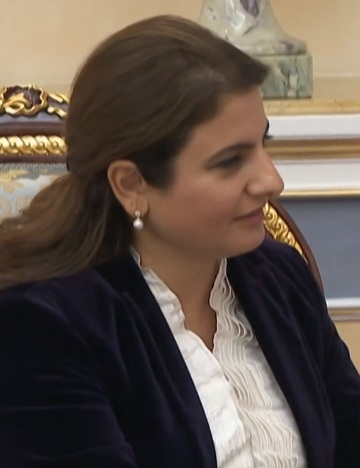
- Sawsan Kamal, February 2019

Member of the Council of Representatives
- Incumbent
- Assumed office 2018
- Monarch: Hamad bin Isa Al Khalifa
- Prime Minister: Khalifa bin Salman Al Khalifa, Salman, Crown Prince of Bahrain
- Parliamentary group: independent
- Constituency: Second Constituency of the Capital Governorate

Personal details
- Born: Sawsan Mohammed Abdul Rahim Kamal
- Education: Arabian Gulf University
- Occupation: clinical psychologist

Sawsan Mohammed Abdul Rahim Kamal (Arabic: سوسن كمال) is a Bahraini politician and psychiatrist. She was sworn into the Council of Representatives for the Second Constituency of the Capital Governorate on December 12, 2018.

== Education ==
Kamal obtained a Bachelor of Medical Sciences from the Arabian Gulf University in 1994, followed by a Bachelor of Medicine, Bachelor of Surgery with honors from the same school in 1995. She earned a Certificate in Psychiatry from the Arab Board of Health Specializations in Damascus, Syria in 2003.

== Career ==
Kamal worked as a counselor psychiatrist at the Ministry of Health from 1997 to 2017. She founded her own consultancy firm in February 2017, joining the National Association for Education and Training Support in Bahrain that April. That December, she earned a certificate from the International Academy of Peace Ambassadors in Amman, Jordan. She was appointed to the Bahrain Chamber of Commerce and Industry’s Health Committee in June 2018.

== Council of Representatives ==
Kamal entered politics by running in the 2018 Bahraini general election for the Council of Representatives, in which she ran for the second district in the Capital Governorate. She won 1,585 votes in the first round on November 24, good for 48.25%, and defeated Faisal bin Rajab in the second round with 1,894 votes for 70.62%.
