= List of universities in Bahrain =

This is a list of universities in Bahrain.

== Public universities and higher education institutions ==
There are four public universities in Bahrain.

University		Year founded	University rankings
Seal	Full name	Year founded	QS	THE	ARWU
	Arabian Gulf Universityجامعة الخليج العربي	1980
	Bahrain Polytechnicبوليتكنك البحرين	2008
	College of Health Sciencesكلية العلوم الصحية والرياضية	1976
	University of Bahrainجامعة البحرين	1986	801-1000

== Private universities and higher education institutions ==
- Applied Science University
- Arab Open University
- University of Technology Bahrain
- American University of Bahrain
- Vatel Hotel & Tourism Business School
- Ahlia University
- Bahrain Institute of Banking and Finance
- British University of Bahrain
- Gulf University
- Kingdom University
- Royal College of Surgeons in (RCSI) - Bahrain
- Royal University for Women
- Talal Abu Ghazaleh University College of Business
- University College of Bahrain
- Euro University of Bahrain
