= Ali bin Saleh Al Saleh =

Bahraini politician (born 1942)

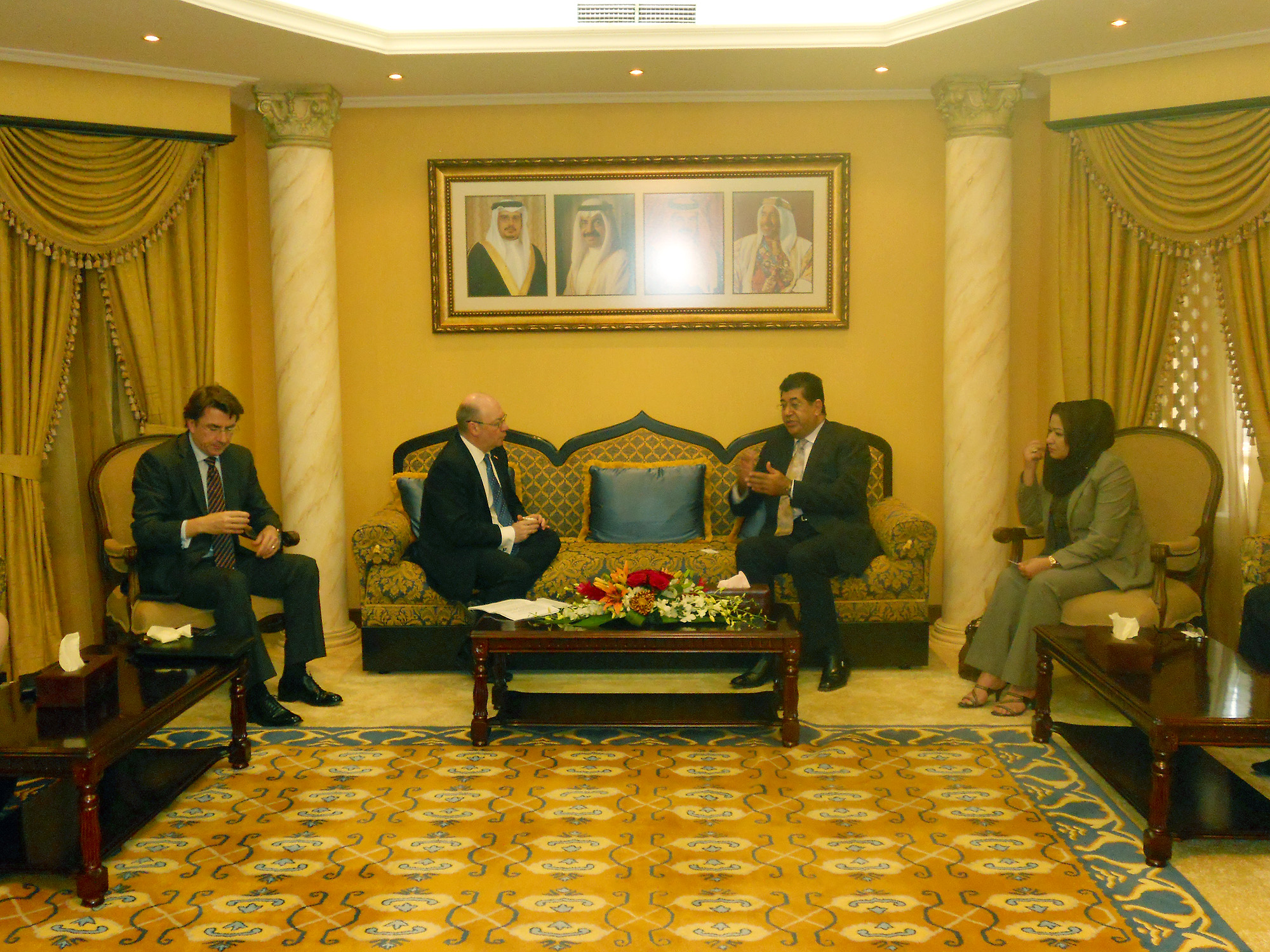
Al Saleh (second on the right) meeting then UK Foreign Office Minister Alistair Burt, December 2011

Ali bin Saleh Al Saleh (born 1942) is a politician from Bahrain. He has been serving as the chairman and president of Consultative Council of Bahrain from December 2006.

He was a member of the constituent assembly in 1973, and a member of Bahrain National Assembly from 1973 to 1975. He was elected second deputy speaker of the Consultative Council of Bahrain in 1993. He served as minister of commerce and industry from 1995 to 2004, and minister of municipalities and agriculture from 2005 to 2006.
