= British University of Bahrain =

Private university in Saar, Bahrain

- British University of Bahrain is located in the East Tower of the Atrium Mall in Saar, Bahrain
- Other names: BUB
- Motto: Seek Knowledge
- Type: Private
- Established: 2018; 8 years ago
- Location: Saar, Bahrain
- Website: www.bub.bh
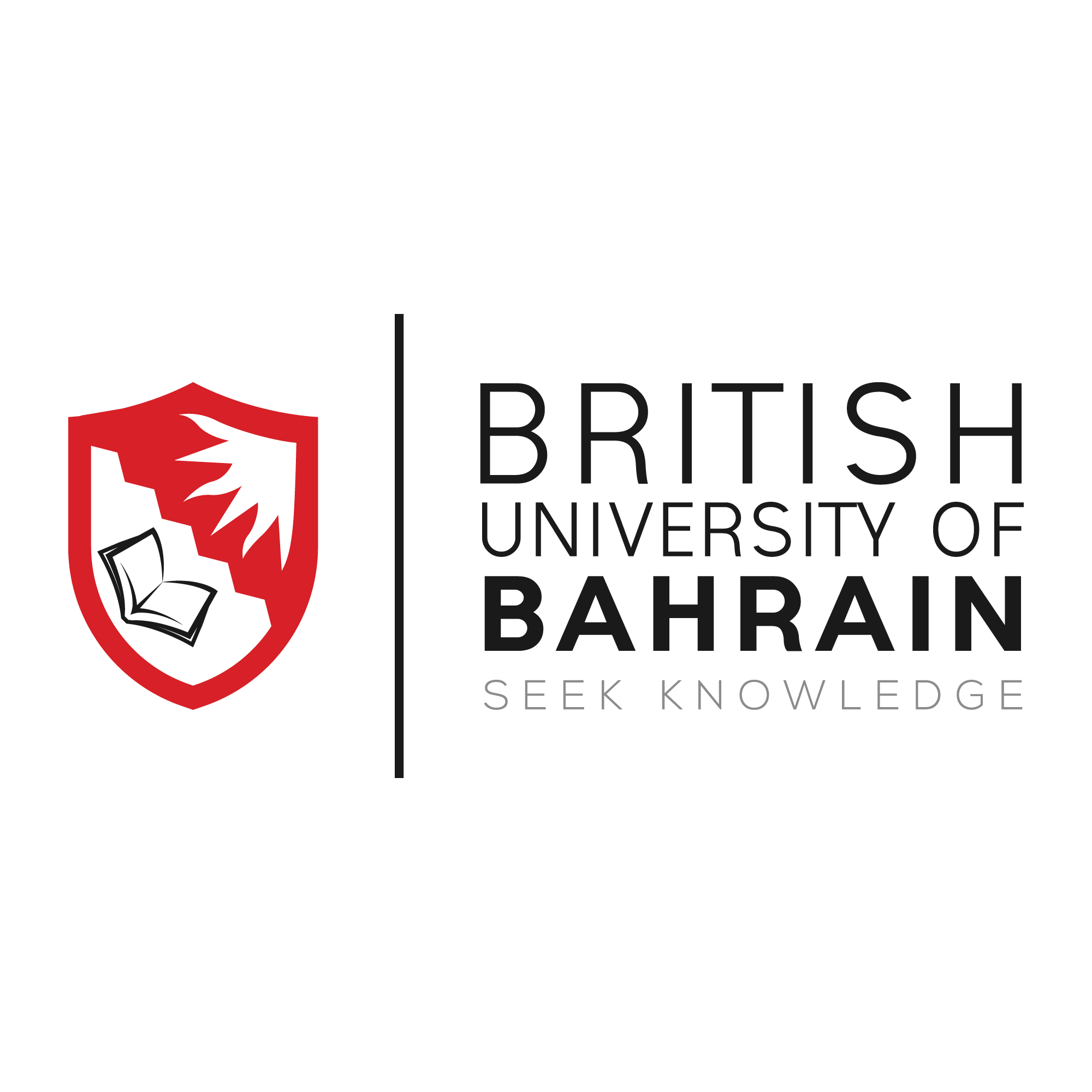

The British University of Bahrain (BUB) is a private university located in Saar, in the Kingdom of Bahrain. Established in 2018 in partnership with the University of Salford in Manchester, it awards undergraduate British degrees in the country.

== Academic programmes ==
The programmes being offered at the British University of Bahrain are exactly identical to the ones being offered at the University of Salford. There is a College of Business, College of Engineering and Built Environment, and College of Information and Communication Technology; each with several bachelor's degrees offered.

== Campus ==
BUB is located in a purpose-built ten storey building in the Saar area of Bahrain. The campus includes a 424-seater auditorium, a high-tech learning resource centre, contemporary recreational and work spaces as well as more than fifty classrooms, workshops, and laboratories. The campus is located adjacent to a shopping mall, which offers students a wide range of additional facilities, including a hyper-market, 13-screen cinema complex, and a wide range of retail outlets, cafes, restaurants, and recreational facilities. The university also serves as a testing centre for the IELTS exam.

== See also ==
- List of universities in Bahrain
