= Alees Samaan =

Bahraini politician and Diplomat

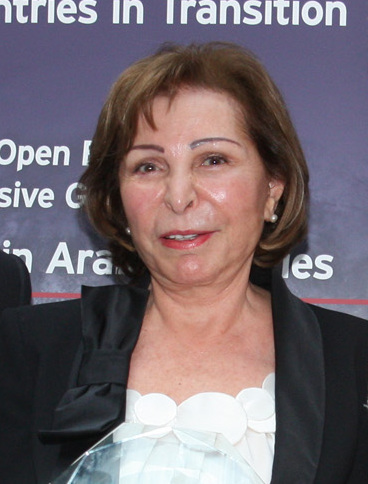
Alees Samaan in 2013

Alees Thomas Samaan (sometimes spelled as Alice) is a Bahraini politician and former ambassador to the United Kingdom. She was the first woman to chair a parliament in the Middle East when in April 2005 she chaired Bahrain's upper house of parliament, the Consultative Council. Samaan was one of four women to sit in the Consultative Council.

She belongs to the native Bahraini Christian community.

In March 2015, Samaan was awarded the Grassroot Diplomat Initiative Honouree for making it her priority to reconcile the people and bring them together. She became the first female Gulf Cooperation Council Ambassador to the UK. In 2002, Ms. Samaan became one of six women appointed to the Shura Council and later made history in the Arab world in 2005 by becoming the first woman to chair a session of Parliament in the region. Covered by the global media, the incident was viewed as a sign of gradual progress towards a more open democracy in Bahrain.
