= Adnan Shihab-Eldin =

Kuwaiti physicist and energy economist

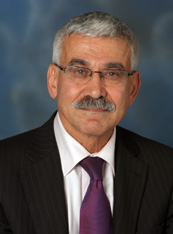
- Dr. Adnan Shihab-Eldin in 2015
- Born: 1 November 1943 (age 82)
- Occupations: Physicist, Energy Economist, Academic
- Known for: Director General of KFAS, Acting Secretary General of OPEC

Adnan Shihab-Eldin (born 1 November 1943) is a Kuwaiti physicist, energy economist, and academic. He is currently a Senior Visiting Research Fellow at the Oxford Institute for Energy Studies (OIES) and a founding board member of the Kearney Energy Transition Institute in the Netherlands.

He served as Director General and board member of the Kuwait Foundation for the Advancement of Sciences (KFAS) from 2007 to 2021. From 2001 to 2006, he was Director of Research and Acting Secretary General at the Organization of the Petroleum Exporting Countries (OPEC).

== Biography ==
Adnan Shihab-Eldin is a Senior Visiting Research Fellow at the Oxford Institute for Energy Studies and a founding member of the Board of Directors of the Kearney Energy Transition Institute (Netherlands). He previously served as Director General and board member of the Kuwait Foundation for the Advancement of Sciences (2007–2021) and held the roles of Acting Secretary General and Director of Research at OPEC (2000–2006). Earlier in his career, he held senior leadership positions at UNESCO and the International Atomic Energy Agency (IAEA). In Kuwait, Dr. Shihab-Eldin was Director General of the Kuwait Institute for Scientific Research (KISR) and served as a faculty member and Vice Rector for Academic Affairs at Kuwait University.

Shihab-Eldin is currently an adjunct professor at the Executive Academy of the Vienna University of Economics and Business (WU), and continues to teach, deliver invited lectures, and publish research on energy policy, technology, and economics. He serves on numerous international boards and advisory councils, including the International Advisory Council of the American University of Beirut (AUB), the International Advisory Council of Ambrosetti – The European House, and the joint Board of Georgetown University Qatar (GU-Q). In 2023, he was appointed to the Board of Sponsors of the Bulletin of the Atomic Scientists, founded by Albert Einstein.

Dr. Shihab-Eldin earned all his degrees from the University of California, Berkeley, and is the recipient of several prestigious international honors, including the 2018 Haas International Alumni Achievement Award from UC Berkeley, the 2022 Lifetime Professional Achievement Award from the International Association for Energy Economics, and the 2023 Salam Spirit Award from the International Centre for Theoretical Physics (ICTP), Trieste, Italy.

== Education ==
Shihab-Eldin received all his academic degrees from the University of California, Berkeley: a B.Sc. in Electrical Engineering (1965), an M.Sc. (1967), and a Ph.D. in Nuclear Engineering (1970). He is a Phi Beta Kappa graduate.

== Career ==
He began his career at the Kuwait National Petroleum Company (KNPC). He later held research and teaching positions at Kuwait University, the University of California, Berkeley, Lawrence Berkeley National Laboratory, Harvard University, and CERN.

He also held major leadership positions including:

- Director General of the Kuwait Institute for Scientific Research (KISR)
- Vice Rector for Academic Affairs at Kuwait University
- Director of the UNESCO Cairo Office (Regional Office for Science and Technology for the Arab States)
- Director of the Division for Africa, Asia & Far East at the International Atomic Energy Agency (IAEA)

== Academic Roles ==
Dr. Shihab-Eldin currently serves as an adjunct professor at the Executive Academy of the Vienna University of Economics and Business (WU), teaching in the MBA Energy Management program and sitting on its advisory board.

== Boards and Advisory Councils ==
He is a member of several advisory and governance boards, including:

- American University of Beirut – International Advisory Council
- Georgetown University Qatar – Joint Board
- The European House – Ambrosetti – International Advisory Council
- King Abdullah Petroleum Studies and Research Center – International Advisory Council

== Awards ==
Dr. Shihab-Eldin has received numerous international honors, including:

- 2023 – Salam Spirit Award, International Centre for Theoretical Physics (ICTP)
- 2022 – Lifetime Professional Achievement Award, International Association for Energy Economics (IAEE)
- 2018 – Haas International Alumni Award, UC Berkeley
- 2017 – Chevalier de la Légion d’Honneur (France)
- 2014 – Lifetime Achievement Award, Abdullah Bin Hamad Al-Attiyah International Energy Awards
- 2006 – Gold Medal of the Presidency of the Italian Republic
- 1985 – Energy for Mankind Award, Global Energy Society
- 1985 – Yahya Al-Mashad Award, AAUG
- 1965 – Best Student Citation, UC Berkeley
