= Sameera bint Ibrahim Rajab =

Bahraini politician

Minister of State for Information Affairs (Bahrain)
- Incumbent
- Assumed office April 2012

Member of the Consultative Assembly of Bahrain
- In office 2006–2012

Personal details
- Education: Beirut Arab University (BSc)
- Occupation: Politician, journalist, political analyst

Sameera bint Ibrahim Rajab is a Bahraini politician and former member of Majlis al-shura and Minister of State for Information.

== Education ==
Rajab did her BSc in Economics from Beirut Arab University and also holds diplomas in Communication Management and Accounting.

== Career ==
Rajab has experience as a journalist, columnist and political analyst before becoming a member of the upper house of the National Assembly, Majlis al-shura (2006–12). She has also served on the Governing Council of International Federation of Family Planning and Care. In April 2012, a decree issued by King of Bahrain, Hamad bin Isa Al Khalifa appointed Rajab Minister of State for Information Affairs. She also acted as the official spokesperson of the Government of Bahrain.

The Arab Information Ministers Council in 2016, recognised Rajab as "one of the most prominent Arab media figures". She is also a member of Islamic National Conference, founding and board member of Bahrain Society for Family Planning and Care beside being an associate member of Arab National Conference's General Secretariat.
