= Be-Free =

Human rights organization

Be-Free Program "برنامج "كن حراً
- Founded: 2002
- Type: Non-profit
- Location: Zinj, Manama (Bahrain)
- Website: Official website

Be-Free Program of Bahrain Women Association - for Human Development is a program concerned with the protection of children and teenagers from abuse and neglect. As well as building their personalities, so they can take effective and positive roles in the community. It was started on 19 March 2002, with the support of the former Human Rights Commissioner Mary Robinson.

== Projects ==
=== “I am a Strong, Smart, and Safe Child” ===
Trains children on essential protection skills in a fun and interactive way, away from fear, as studies show that more than 85% of child abuse cases could have been prevented if children knew some protection skills.

Parents are also trained on the main concepts and skills to contribute in the protection of their children.

=== It's My Right to Understand My Rights ===
In April 2008, and in partnership with UNICEF, Be-Free started a program for Teaching child rights to children, under the name "It's my right to understand my rights". This project is based on the UN Convention on the Rights of the Child.

=== Protection of children over the Internet ===
In July 2008, Be-Free started a new project to protect children from the dangers of the Internet "SMART+".

=== Children with disability ===
In February 2009, Be-Free launched a special protection program for Children with disability "I am a Strong, Smart, and Safe Child …in spite of my disability" under the patronage of the UN Special Rapporteur on Disability H.H. Sh. Hessa Al-Thani.

=== “Color Your Life with Your Choices” Academic and Social Development Project ===
Students encounter a number of obstacles and challenges during the course of their educational journey, this project assists students and their parents in facing these challenges, and learn from them.

=== “Me and the Other” ===
In 2011, Be-Free launched this project that aims at creating a culture in which differences between people in color, nationality, language, faith, etc. are respected, and everyone learns from them.

=== Instilling Universal Knowledge ===
A pioneer project, launched in 2014, that assists educational institutions with its different levels in adopting innovative and creative methods to make the institutions a more desirable place for students. It increases their awareness, and moves them beyond learning to reach universal knowledge. It inspires them to transcend the limitations of self-centered life to aspire for building communities and painting their Humanistic mark on the world ...

== Awards ==
- Shaikh Is bin Ali Al Khalifa Award for Best Voluntary Project (2015)
- H.H Sheikha Fatima bint Mubarak Arab Youth Award (2013)
- UNICEF Regional Award for Information on Children Rights (2010)
- European Union Chaillot Prize for Human Rights (2009)

== Solidarity Campaigns ==
- Fatima, the missing child: In 2002, Fatima was 11 years old when she went missing from her father's house, after being severely physically and emotionally abused by her father and his girlfriend. Be-Free held a campaign (It was considered the biggest in the history of the Gulf Countries) to search for Fatima, and to raise the awareness of the community that, child abuse is a community issue and not a family-issue only. High authorities in Bahrain were involved in the searching campaign including the King of Bahrain H.M. Shaikh Hamad bin Isa Al Khalifa, and the Prime Minister H.H. Shaikh Khalifa ibn Salman Al Khalifa. The child was not found until now.
- Protecting children under war: In 2006 Be-Free started a 30 days campaign to raise awareness about the rights of children under war to be safe and protected, and that children should not be targets for any war.
- Protect children from abuse: This was a 40 days campaign (10 October 2008- 19 November 2008) to raise community awareness about protecting children from abuse. In this campaign mini-workshops were delivered in shopping malls, health centers, and clubs for both children and parents (each separately) .
