= Quality Assurance Authority for Education and Training =

Kingdom of Bahrain Quality Assurance Authority for Education and Training (QAAET)
- هيئة ضمان جودة التعليم والتدريب
- Emblem of Bahrain

Agency overview
- Jurisdiction: Bahrain
- Headquarters: Manama (Bahrain)
- Agency executives: Abdul Aziz Al Fadhel, Chairman; Ahmed A. Al Bahr, Vice Chairman; Jawaher Al Mudhahki, Chief Executive
- Parent agency: Council of Ministers of Bahrain
- Website: Official website

The Quality Assurance Authority for Education and Training (QAAET) is the governmental education quality assurance authority in Bahrain. As a part of the National Education and Training Reform Project, which is an initiative of the Crown Prince, a decision was taken to ensure that there is quality of education at all levels within the Kingdom of Bahrain. The Quality Assurance Authority for Education & Training was established by the Royal Decree No. 32 of 2008 amended by the Royal Decree No. 6 of 2009. In terms of Article (4) of the decree, its mandate is to ‘review the quality of the performance of education and training institutions in light of the guiding indicators developed by the Authority’. The Authority is also required to publish review reports as well as to report annually on the status of education within the Kingdom; this includes findings as well as improvements that have occurred as a result of the Authority’s activities. QAAET is an independent authority that carries out its mandated under the directions of His Excellency Shaikh Khalid bin Abdullah Al Khalifa, Deputy Prime Minister, Chairman of the Quality Assurance Authority for Education and Training. The Authority is regulated by the Council of Ministers and reports to it. To meet this mandate, four units were established within the QAAET: the Schools Review Unit, the Vocational Review Unit, the Higher Education Review Unit, and the National Examinations Unit. QAAET is a member of the Arab Network for Quality Assurance in Higher Education (ANQAHE).

== Schools Review Unit ==
The Schools Review Unit is responsible for evaluating and reporting on the quality of provision in schools, establishing success measures, spreading best practice and making recommendations for school improvement. The Unit requires each school to provide a post- Review Action Plan which is signed off by the Ministry. The Action Plan should be received 6 weeks after the school receives the draft review report. After signing off the Action Plan, the Ministry should support and monitor improvement.

== Vocational Review Unit ==
The Vocational Review Unit identifies strengths and areas for improvement in vocational education and training providers, focuses on the achievement and experience of learners, recommends how weaknesses might be addressed, promotes improvement and a culture of self-evaluation and accountability among providers, spreads best practices and offers policy advice to key stakeholders.

== Higher Education Review Unit ==
The Higher Education Review Unit conducts reviews into the quality assurance arrangements of higher education institutions and identifies areas in need of improvement and areas of strength, conducts programme reviews within higher education institutions, and ensures that higher education providers are publicly accountable. Providers are required to submit Improvement Plans to the Unit 3 months after publication of reports, which address the findings of the review reports irrespective of whether the review was about the institution’s quality assurance arrangements as a whole or regarding a particular programme.

== National Examinations Unit ==
The National Examinations Unit is responsible for independently and nationwide examine the four core subjects of Mathematics, Science, Arabic and English in Grades 3, 6 and 9 to evaluate learning progress against the national curriculum, publish information on student, class and school performance, establish and implement examination requirements for Grade 12, and work with different stakeholders to improve education in Bahrain.

== See also ==
- Arab Network for Quality Assurance in Higher Education (ANQAHE)
- Ministry of Education, Bahrain
