= Royal University for Women =

Baharaini women's university

- Other names: RUW
- Motto in English: Where Women Excel
- Type: Private
- Established: 2005
- Chairman: Fahad Al Zamil
- President: Professor Reyad Hamzah
- Vice-president: Professor Jean-Pierre El Asmar
- Location: Muaskar Highway, West Riffa, Bahrain; 26.1019°N 50.5512°E
- Campus: 224,000 square meter campus
- Website: www.ruw.edu.bh

Royal University for Women (RUW) in West Riffa, Kingdom of Bahrain is the first private, purpose-built, international university in the country that is dedicated solely to educating women. Established in 2005, the initial degree programmes of the university were designed in collaboration with McGill University in Canada and Middlesex University in the United Kingdom. Among the courses offered by the university are Bachelor of Arts degrees in fashion design, graphic design, and interior design; Bachelor of Science degree in architecture; as well as Bachelor of Law and Bachelor of Business degrees in [banking and finance], human resources, international business, and marketing . Master of Design Management, Master of Fine Arts in Drawing and Painting, Master of Business Administration.

== Faculties ==
The Royal University for Women has three constituent colleges and one centre :

- College of Art & Design
- College of Business & Law
- College of Engineering & Technology
- Centre for General Studies

== See also ==
- List of universities in Bahrain
