= College of Health and Sport Sciences =

Public college in Bahrain

Coordinates: 26°13′1″N 50°34′25″E

- كلية العلوم الصحية والرياضية
- Logo of the College
- Type: Public university
- Established: 1976; 50 years ago
- Dean: Dr. Amal Akleh
- Location: Manama, Bahrain
- Website: Official website

CHS campus.

The College of Health and Sport Sciences (Arabic: كلية العلوم الصحية والرياضية) is a public higher education institution situated in the Kingdom of Bahrain. Established in 1976, it is a constituent college of the University of Bahrain.

== History ==
The college was established in 1976 by the Bahraini Ministry of Health, in partnership with the American University of Beirut and the University of Illinois at Chicago. The institution has been a driving force of Bahrainization of the healthcare workforce in the country. In 2011, a royal decree by the King of Bahrain Hamad bin Isa Al Khalifa led to a merger of the previously-independent college with the University of Bahrain as a constituent college.

== Courses ==
The College offers BSc degrees programme in Nursing, six Allied Health subjects: Dental Hygiene, Medical Laboratory Technology, Pharmacy, Public Health, Radiography and Physiotherapy and physical education. In 2018, the college started their MSc program in Nursing, and Physiotherapy.

== Campus ==
The college's campus is in the neighborhood of Salmaniya, in Manama, the capital of Bahrain. It is located within the Salmaniya Medical Complex (SMC), together with the Arabian Gulf University and Salmaniya Hospital. The campus includes an administration and student affairs building, and multiple nursing and laboratory blocks. Additionally, facilities include a three floor building which hosts multiple offices, classrooms, laboratories and the Ahmed al-Farsi library. It also features the 'Al Ma'arif Auditorium' which provides a venue for special classes, workshops, meetings, seminars and conferences. A computer laboratory was installed in 1988.

== See also ==
- List of universities in Bahrain
