= University of Bahrain =

Public university in the Kingdom of Bahrain

Coordinates: 26.0522°N 50.5084°E

- جامعة البحرين; Jāmiʿat al-Baḥrayn
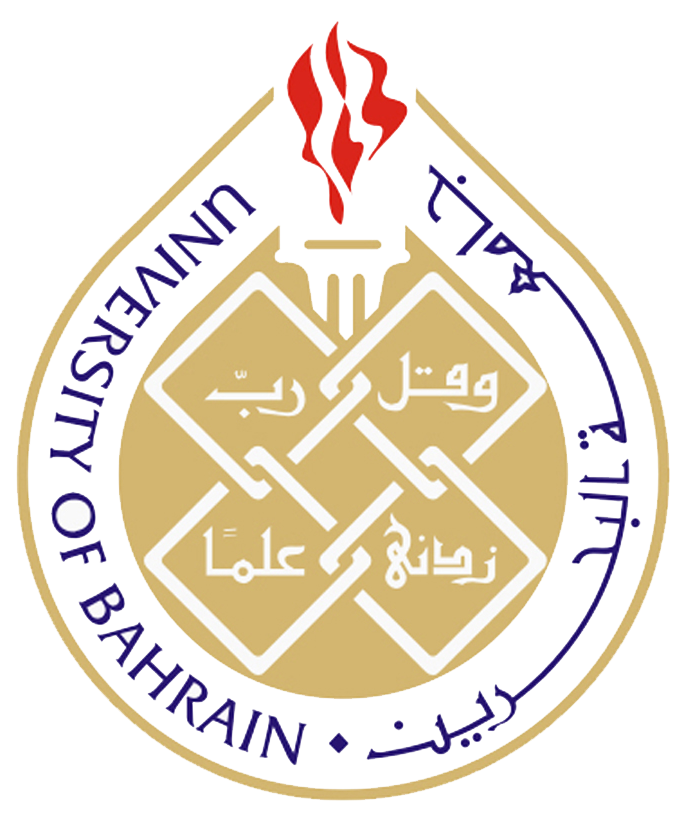
- Logo
- Motto: وَقُل رَّبِّ زِدْنِي عِلْماً
- Motto in English: "Say: My God! Increase my knowledge." (Qur'an 20:114)
- Type: Public
- Established: 1986; 40 years ago
- Affiliations: IAU, FUIW
- Endowment: BD 39.061 million (2021)
- Chairman: Dr. Mohamed bin Mubarak Jum'a
- President: Dr. Fu'ad al-Ansari
- Academic staff: 761 (2019)
- Administrative staff: 1,535 (2019)
- Students: 30,317
- Campus: Sakhir, Isa Town, and Salmaniya 156,607 m^{2} (1,685,700 sq ft)
- Colours: Blue and gold
- Website: uob.edu.bh

The University of Bahrain (Arabic: جامعة البحرين), often abbreviated as UOB, is a public university in Bahrain. Established by royal decree in 1986, it has since become the largest institution of higher education in Bahrain, with three campuses (Sakhir, Isa Town, and Salmaniya) and more than 30,000 registered students. The university comprises nine colleges: Arts, Applied Studies, Business Administration, Engineering, Health and Sport Sciences, Information Technology (IT), Law, Science, and the Bahrain Teachers' College.

The university is a member of the International Association of Universities and the Federation of the Universities of the Islamic World.

== History ==
The University of Bahrain was established in 1986 as a result of Amiri Decree No. 12 /1986. The decree resulted in the merger of two public colleges; the Gulf Polytechnic (previously established in 1968) and the University College of Arts, Science and Education (established in 1979).

== Campus ==
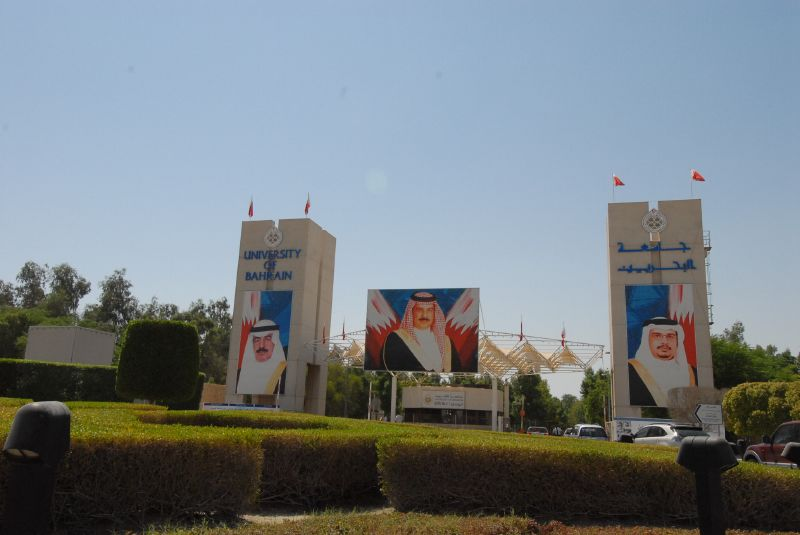
The entrance to the Sakhir campus.

The university has three campuses. Its main campus in Sakhir covers an area of 103,657 m² and houses all the colleges except the Colleges of Health Science and Engineering. The College of Health Sciences is based in a 10,000 m^{2} (110,000 sq ft) campus next to the Salmaniya Medical Complex. The College of Engineering is based in a 10,000 m^{2} (110,000 sq ft) campus alongside the Bahrain Polytechnic.

The university owns a total of 66 buildings, 240 classrooms, 183 labs, and three gymnasiums. The university has four libraries, with the Central Library having an estimated 250,000 books in stock. The library also has access to the British Library database.

=== Colleges ===
The University of Bahrain receives US$110 million as a budget from the Bahraini government. The university consists of 10 constituent colleges:

- S1A – College of Arts
- S1B – College of Business Administration
- S20B & S20C – College of Applied Studies
- S20A – College of Physical Education & Physiotherapy
- S22 – Bahrain Teachers College (BTC)
- S39 – College of Law
- S40 – College of Information Technology
- S41 – College of Science
- College of Engineering (Isa Town)
- College of Health Sciences

=== Other buildings ===
Aside from colleges; the university includes other buildings around the main Sakhir campus for different purposes:

- S37 – Admission & Registration
- S17 – The Department of English Language and Literature & the Students Council Center
- I14 – Engineering
- I15 – Engineering
- S18 – Exams Hall
- S20 – The English Language Center
- S47 – The IT & Science Library
- Swimming Pool (Physical Education)
- The Bahrain Credit Media Center
- Zain E-Learning Center
- The Confucius Institute for Chinese Language Courses
- The King Sejong Institute for Korean Language Courses
- Student & Teachers' Apartments
- Gulf University Society Center
- Printing Center

== Academia ==
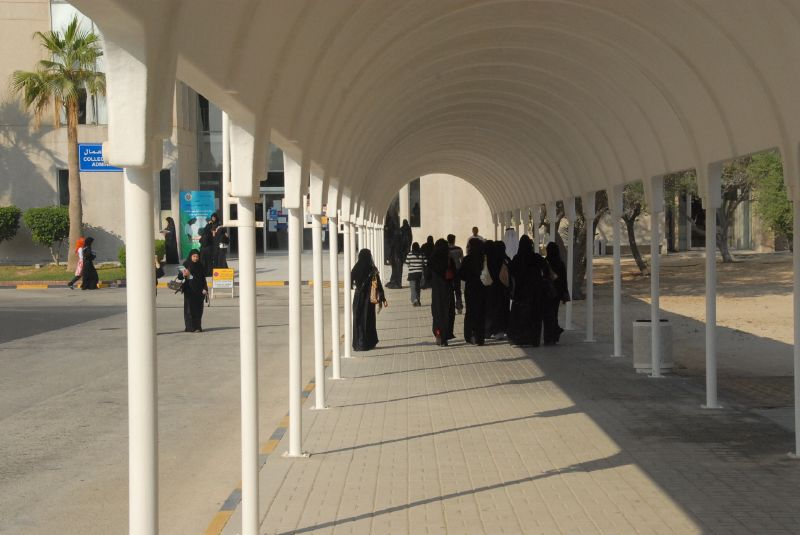
Students at the university.

The university offers more than 102 academic programs, including 42 Bachelor programs, 39 Master's degrees, 10 PhDs and 11 associate diplomas. Credit hours vary between courses and degree level (126-135 credit hours for bachelor's degrees, for example). The university admits 15,000 students per annum, 80% of whom start in September. The university's admission criteria generally require a high school score of 70%, in addition to other criteria imposed by some colleges.

=== Research ===
Since 1986, more than 5,000 research papers and books have been published by academics in the university, 80% of which was produced by the Colleges of Science and Engineering respectively. The university allocates US$11 million annually towards research and supports 38 full-time research personnel. More than 500 Masters thesis was published since the university's inception.

University rankings

Global – Overall
- QS World: 951-1000 (2026)

=== Reputation ===
The university consistently ranks as the first nationally, 23rd amongst Arab universities and 801-1000 internationally according to QS World University Rankings as of 2020.

== Student life ==
The university has 30,317 registered students at the start of the 2014/15 academic year, more than 65% of whom are female. 10.5% of the student population are international students. There were an estimated 700 events and activities in the 2012–13 academic year. The university has a student council elected annually, with each constituent college electing a representative.

== Notable alumni ==
- Salman Bin Ibrahim Al-Khalifa, President of the Asian Football Confederation
- Mohamed Ali Hasan Ali, Member of the Consultative Council

== See also ==
- List of Islamic educational institutions
- List of universities in Bahrain
- Education in Bahrain
