= American University of Bahrain =

Private university in Riffa, Bahrain

- الجامعة الأمريكية بالبحرين
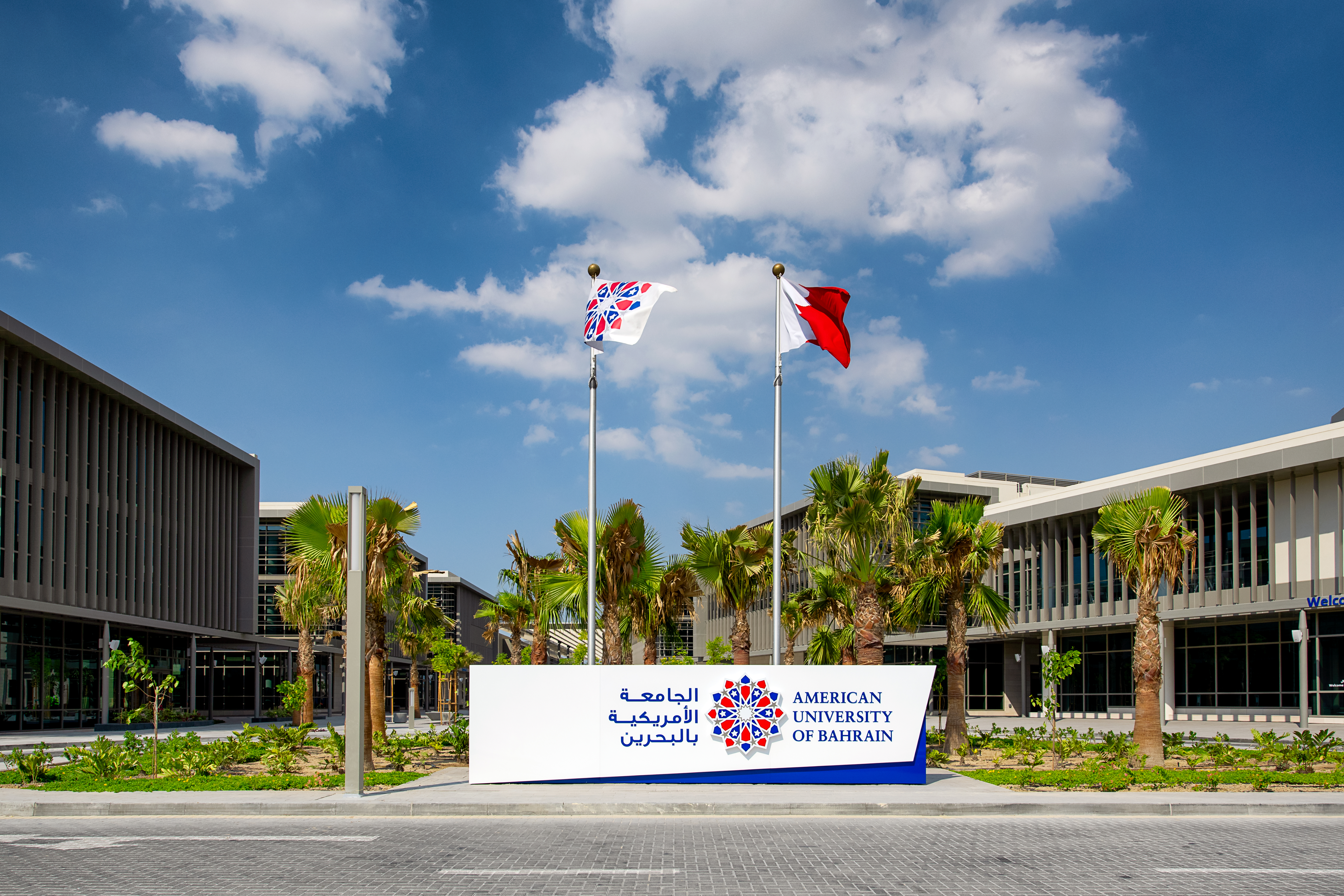
- Campus entrance
- Type: Private
- Established: 2019
- Accreditation: WSCUC
- Chairman: Hisham Al-Saie
- President: Wafa Almansoori (interim)
- Academic staff: 43
- Students: 992 (Fall 2024)
- Location: Riffa, Southern Governorate, 38884, Bahrain; 26.102122°N 50.54722°E
- Campus: 75,000 square meter campus
- Colors: Grey, Bahrain Red, American Blue
- Mascot: The Mustangs
- Website: www.aubh.edu.bh

The American University of Bahrain (Arabic: الجامعة الأمريكية بالبحرين, abbreviated AUBH) is a private university situated in Riffa, Bahrain. Opened in September 2019 and licensed by the Higher Education Council of Bahrain. It is the first purpose-built American-model university in the country. AUBH is licensed by the Higher Education Council of the Ministry of Education of Bahrain. The university is governed by a board of trustees.

== AUBH Partnerships ==
The American University of Bahrain is the first comprehensive, purpose-built, American-model co-educational University in the Kingdom of Bahrain and is supported through the Mumtalakat portfolio. Dr. Susan E. Saxton was appointed as the founding president and first president since the university opened the campus during the autumn of 2019.

In November 2021, AUBH announced the finalization of an academic partnership with California State University, Northridge (CSUN), part of the largest university system in the U.S.: California State University. CSUN in the city of Los Angeles accredited by the Western Association of Schools and Colleges. This partnership is the first of its kind in the Kingdom of Bahrain.

Over the years AUBH was persistently partnering with several industries, partnerships with (MISTI), Massachusetts institute of technology, (International Science and Technology Initiative). These partnerships can enable its students to engage in workshops such as 3D modeling design and fabrication, robotics workshops and startups on the occasions of workshops all that benefits students to engage on their projects.

Other partnerships were made with Bahrain's space agency the (NSSA) national space science. As well as partnerships with the telecommunications Zain Group in Bahrain.

== Campus ==
The university's 75,000-square-metre (19-acre) campus is located in Bahrain's Southern Governorate, in Riffa. It was designed by US-based architects Ayers Saint Gross to accommodate up to 4,000 students and includes a library, four academic buildings each three storeys high, and an auditorium seating 250. The built-up area of campus totals 22,865 square metres (5.650 acres); there are 878 parking spaces.

== Accreditation ==
AUBH is licensed by the Higher Education Council of the Ministry of Education of the kingdom of Bahrain.

On 3 June 2021, a WSCUC panel reviewed the appropriate eligibility criteria and determined that the institution is eligible to proceed with an Application for Accreditation. In March 2023, the university formally gained full WASC accreditation.

== Colleges ==
The university offers programs within three colleges: Business and Management, Engineering, and Media & Design.

- College of Media and Design
  - Bachelor of Arts in Multimedia Design
  - Master of Arts in Multimedia Management
- College of Business and Management
  - Bachelor of Business Administration in Finance
  - Bachelor of Business Administration in Management
  - Bachelor of Business Administration in Digital Marketing & Social Media
  - Bachelor of Business Administration in Human Resources Management
  - Master of Business Administration
- College of Engineering
  - Bachelor of Science in Computer Engineering
  - Bachelor of Science in Data Science and Artificial Intelligence
  - Bachelor of Science in Software Engineering
  - Bachelor of Science in Cybersecurity
  - Bachelor of Science in Industrial Engineering
  - Bachelor of Science in Civil Engineering
  - Bachelor of Science in Computer Science
  - Bachelor of Science in Mechanical Engineering
  - Master of Science in Engineering Management

== Gallery ==
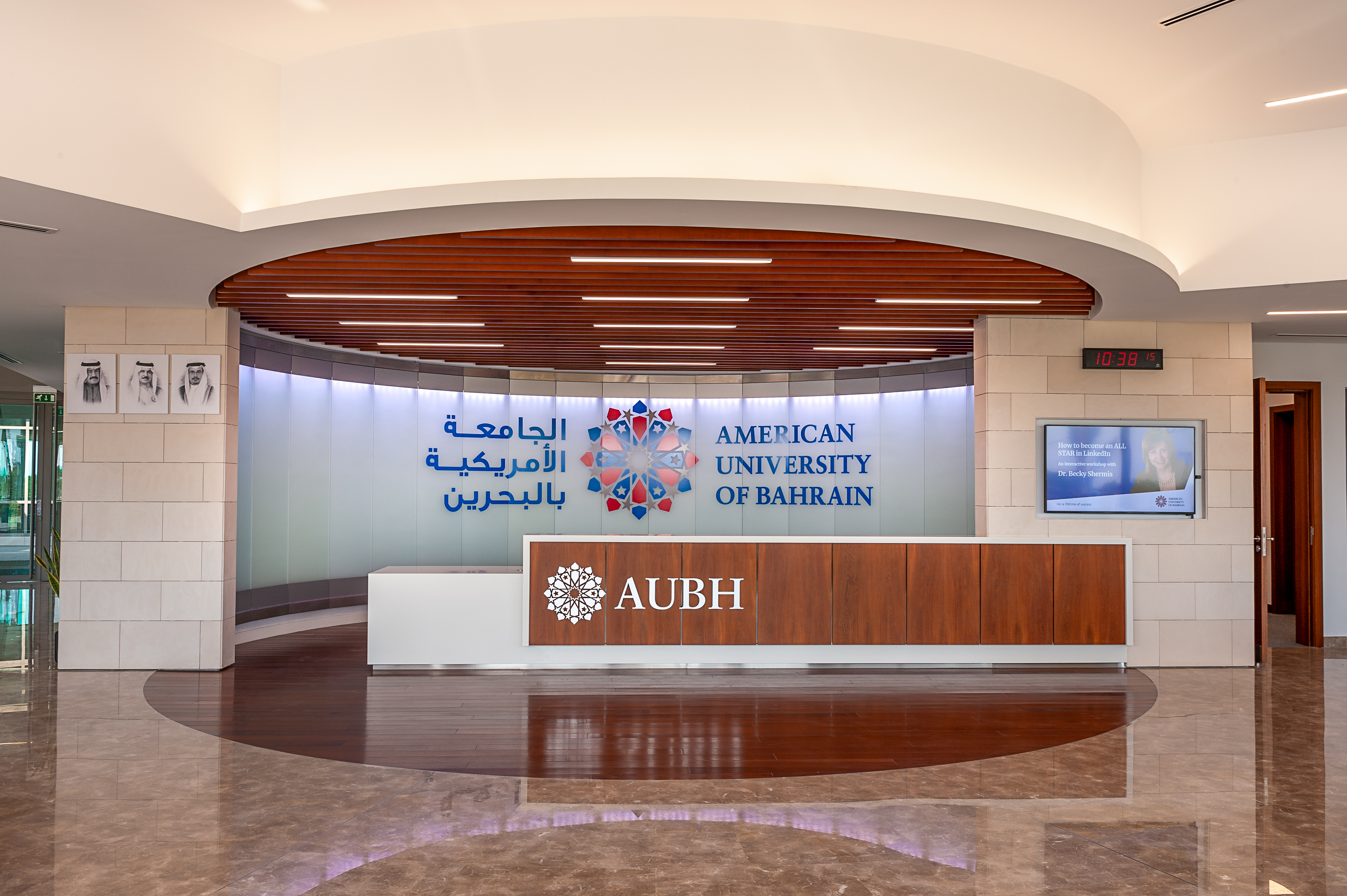
Reception desk

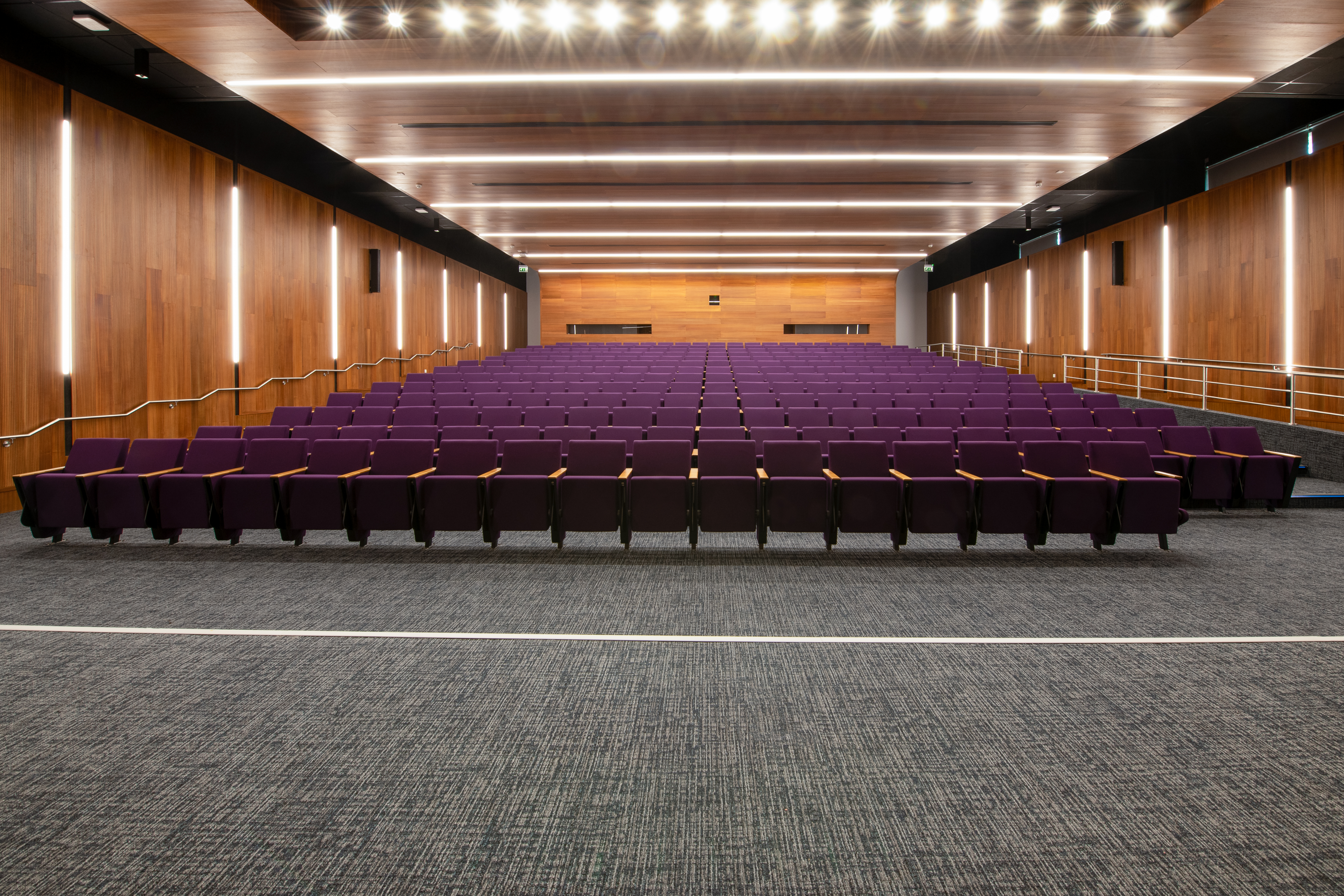
Auditorium

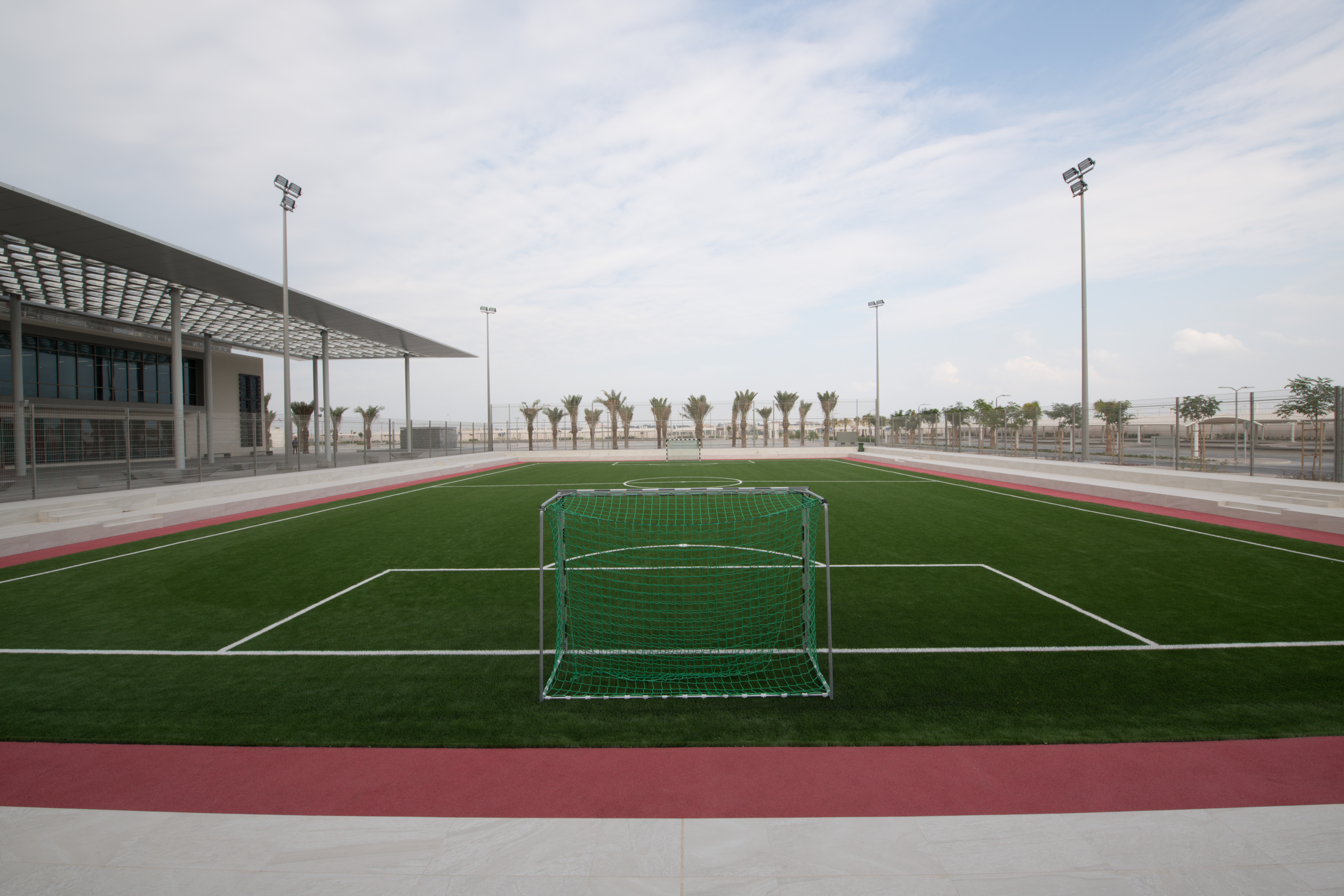
Soccer field

== See also ==
- List of universities in Bahrain
