= Arabian Gulf University =

University in Manama, Bahrain

- جامعة الخليج العربي
- Latin: Sinus Arabicus Universitatis
- Motto: اقرأ باسم ربك الذي خلق
- Motto in English: "Read In The Name Of Your Lord Who Created"
- Type: Public
- Established: 1980; 46 years ago
- Affiliations: Gulf Cooperation Council
- President: H.E Dr. Saad Saud Alfahaid
- Principal: H.E Dr. Saad Saud Alfahaid
- Location: Manama, Bahrain
- Campus: Urban
- Website: https://www.agu.edu.bh

Arabian Gulf University is a university in the city of Manama, in the Kingdom of Bahrain. It is accredited by the Ministry of Education, Bahrain, and governed by Gulf Cooperative Countries, and is a member of Federation of the Universities of the Islamic World. Entry into the university is restricted to GCC nationals, with other Arab nationals considered only if vacancies are available.

== History ==
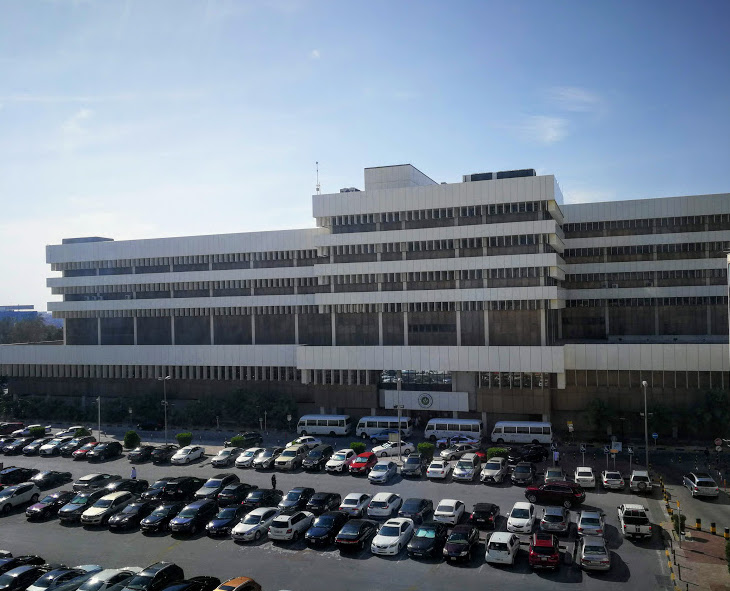
Arabian Gulf University campus in Salmaniya Medical Complex.

Arabian Gulf University (centre) in Salmaniya Medical Complex.

The concept of the university was established after the fourth meeting of the General Convention of Arab Education for the Gulf, in 1979. The university was established by six GCC Countries and Iraq in 1980. The current president of the Arabian Gulf University is Khalid A. N. Al-Ohaly and the current vice-president is Dr. Khaled Tabbara.

In 2018, the university awarded the first of several tenders towards construction of a new multi-phase $1 billion medical city that is to house the university's new campus. The King Abdullah bin Abdulaziz Medical City is currently being built in the Southern Governorate of Bahrain and covers up to 1 million square metres of land personally donated by the King of Bahrain Hamad bin Isa Al Khalifa. The facilities include a 288-bed hospital, numerous outpatient clinics, and medical research centres.

== Colleges ==
The Arabian Gulf University consists of two colleges and a school:

=== College of Medicine and Medical Sciences ===
The decision to establish the college of medicine and medical sciences was taken on 30 March 1980 by the General Council of Ministers of Education in the GCC Countries. The first batch of students were received when 37 students was admitted to the Pre-Medical Programme of the College in October 1982. The first class graduated during the academic year of 1989/90. The university admits up to 150 students annually from across the GCC. In 2009, there were approximately 797 students studying at the university. Since 1982, female students outnumbered male students with the ratio currently being 41:12.

The college follows a problem-based learning curriculum where teaching and learning are carried out through an integrated organ-system based process with the faculty members acting as facilitators to small groups of students.

==== Courses ====
A 6-year undergraduate medical program is available, leading to the M.D qualification. The program is divided into three phases:

- Basic Sciences Phase, which is Year 1.
- Medical Sciences Phase, which include years 2, 3, 4.
- Clinical Clerkships Phase, which include years 5, 6.

Graduate programs include a Diploma and Master of Science in:

- Laboratory medicine
- Health professions education – (under review)
- Health policy and population studies – (under review)

and a doctorate in molecular medicine

- Graduate Diploma degree in distance teaching and training.
- Master's degree in distance teaching and training.

=== College of Graduate Studies ===
The College of Graduate Studies was established in 1994 as a result of a merger between the Faculty of Applied Science and the Faculty of Education. The college primarily focuses on special education training and technology as well as technical studies. Including the previous faculties, more than 500 students have graduated from the college since 1988.

==== Courses ====
Programs offered by the university that can be taken at a Masters or a master's level diploma are:

- Natural Resources and Environment, which includes the following programs: Environmental sciences that examines teristerial, urban and marine environments; Environmental Management, which includes ISO14000, Environmental Management System (EMS), EIA, Project Management, Energy Planning, Environmental Policy; Water Resources Management and Hydrology and groundwater resources management, agricultural techniques and hydroponics
- Geoinformatics, which includes Geographic Information Systems (GIS) and Remote Sensing (RS)
- Biotechnology, which includes medical, agricultural and environmental applications.
- Innovation and Technology Management.
- Mental Disabilities and Autism program
- Learning Disabilities program

The university also offers both a master's and a PhD. in the gifted education program.

- Graduate Diploma degree in distance teaching and training
- Master's degree in distance teaching and training

References and bibliography

Al-Jayyousi, Odeh, (2017). Integral Innovation: New Worldviews. Rutledge, UK. Al-Jayyousi, O. R. (2016). Islam and sustainable development: New worldviews. Routledge. Capra, F. (1983). The turning point: Science, society, and the rising culture. Bantam. Freeman, C. (1982). The economics of industrial innovation. University of Illinois at Urbana-Champaign's Academy for Entrepreneurial Leadership Historical Research Reference in Entrepreneurship. Hawken, P., Lovins, A. B., & Lovins, L. H. (2013). Natural capitalism: The next industrial revolution. Routledge. Nelson, Richard R., ed. National innovation systems: a comparative analysis. Oxford university press, 1993. Sabra, A. I. (Jul/Aug 2002) Greek astronomy and the medieval Arabic tradition. American Scientist, 90(4), 360–397. Saliba, G. (1999) Rethinking the Roots of Modern Science: Arabic Manuscripts in European Libraries. Washington: Center for Contemporary Arab Studies (Georgetown University), Occasional Paper. Turner, R. H. (1995) Science in Medieval Islam: An Illustrated Introduction. Austin: University of Texas Press.

=== French Arabian Business School ===
The French Arabian Business School (FABS) was established in 2007 as a result of an agreement between the Arabian Gulf University and the French Ministry of Foreign Affairs. The school cooperates with the ESSEC Business School, which is one of the foremost business schools and Grandes Écoles in France and one of Europe's top business schools. The school offers a Master of Business Administration course in English.

== Campus ==
The University's campus is in Manama, the capital of Bahrain. It is located within the Salmaniya Medical Complex (SMC), together with the College of Health Sciences and the Salmaniya Hospital. In January 2011, it was announced that the Sulaiman Al Habib Medical Group would establish, manage and also operate the university's medical centre.

AGU also hosts the French Arabian School of Management and Finance, created in 2007.

== Research ==
The Arabian Gulf University publishes original research in the field of pure and applied sciences in its journal. the Arab Gulf Journal of Scientific Research.

Along with Professor Moiz Bakhiet, the Arabian Gulf University owns patent rights to a new polypeptide (ISRAA) designed to help the immune system fight AIDS and other diseases.

== Notable alumni ==
- Sawsan Kamal - Bahraini politician

== See also ==
- List of Islamic educational institutions
- List of medical schools in Bahrain
- List of universities in Bahrain
