= Ministry of Education (Bahrain) =

Government ministry of Bahrain

- وزارة التربية والتعليم

Ministry overview
- Jurisdiction: Cabinet of Bahrain
- Headquarters: Education Area, Isa Town; 26°9′50.15″N 50°32′56.92″E
- Minister responsible: Mohammed bin Mubarak Juma, Minister of Education
- Website: moe.gov.bh

The Ministry of Education is a department of the government of Bahrain. It is responsible for the government-operated schools. As of 2023, Dr. Mohammed bin Mubarak Juma was the minister.

== Higher Education Council ==
Higher Education Council (HEC), the agency which regulates tertiary institutions, was established in 2005.

== Schools ==
Public government-funded schools are segregated based on gender.

== See also ==
- Politics of Bahrain
- Education in Bahrain
- Quality Assurance Authority for Education and Training
