= Consultative Council (Bahrain) =

Upper house of the National Assembly of Bahrain

Consultative Council مجلس الشورى Majlis al-shura

Type
- Type: Upper house of the National Assembly

Leadership
- Chairman: Ali bin Saleh Al Saleh since 15 December 2008
- Secretary-General: Abdul Jalil Ibrahim Al Tarif

Structure
- Seats: 40 members
- Political groups: Independents (40)

Elections
- Voting system: Appointed by the King

Meeting place
- Manama

Website
- www.shura.gov.bh

The Consultative Council (Arabic: مجلس الشورى, romanized: Majlis al-shura), also known as the Shura Council, is the upper house of the National Assembly, the main legislative body of Bahrain.

The Council comprises 40 members appointed directly by the King of Bahrain. The 40 nominated members of the Consultative Council combined with the 40 elected members of the Council of Representatives form the National Assembly of Bahrain. All laws (except for "Royal decrees") have to be passed by both chambers of the Assembly. This allows technical expertise and minority communities a role within the legislative process: in Bahrain, a Bahraini Christian woman, Alees Samaan, and a Bahraini Jewish man have been appointed. After there was widespread disappointment that no women were elected to the lower house in 2002's general election, four women were appointed to the Consultative Council.

Alees Samaan made history in the Arab world on 18 April 2004 when she became the first woman to chair a session of parliament in the region. The BBC reported: "Incidents of this kind in the Arab world are increasingly being seen as signs of a gradual change towards more open and democratic societies in the entire region."

Supporters of the system refer to democracies such as the United Kingdom and Canada which operate the same bicameral model with an appointed upper chamber and an elected lower chamber. However, the government which nominates citizens to the upper chamber is accountable to the members of the lower house, and therefore the British and Canadian electorates respectively. Further, while these upper chambers each hold a constitutional veto over legislation, it is heavily restricted by constitutional and political convention.

Critics state that the ruling family has sought to use the appointed Consultative Council to guarantee veto power over all legislation. The council includes Faisal Fulad, an activist accused in the Bandargate scandal of illegally receiving a monthly stipend of BD500 (US$1,326) for fomenting sectarian hatred.

Following a political reconciliation between the government and the four party Shia Islamist Al Wefaq-led opposition, there have been persistent rumours that the government is preparing to nominate their activists to the Shura Council. While government officials have denied the plan, reports in the press in April 2006 claimed that opposition leaders have received assurances from a government middleman that some of their iconic figures could be appointed to the Shura. The report added that the opposition leaders "neither accepted nor rejected the offer, but promised to study it carefully".

Three female members of the Consultative Council have been appointed to the government: Dr Nada Haffadh became Bahrain's first woman cabinet minister in 2004 when she became Minister of Health; the second woman to be appointed to the cabinet, Social Affairs Minister Dr Fatima Baloushi, also previously served on the Council, as did Sameera bint Ibrahim Rajab who became Minister of State for Information Affairs in 2012.

In December 2022 Jehad Al Fadhel, who had been a member of the Council since 2012, was appointed Second Deputy Chairman of the Shura Council.

The chairman of the Consultative Council serves as the chairman of the joint National Assembly of Bahrain when it meets. The term of the council is four years.

== See also ==
- List of Chairmen of the Consultative Council of Bahrain
- Politics of Bahrain
