= Embassy of the United States, Manama =

United States diplomatic mission to Bahrain

United States Embassy in Manama
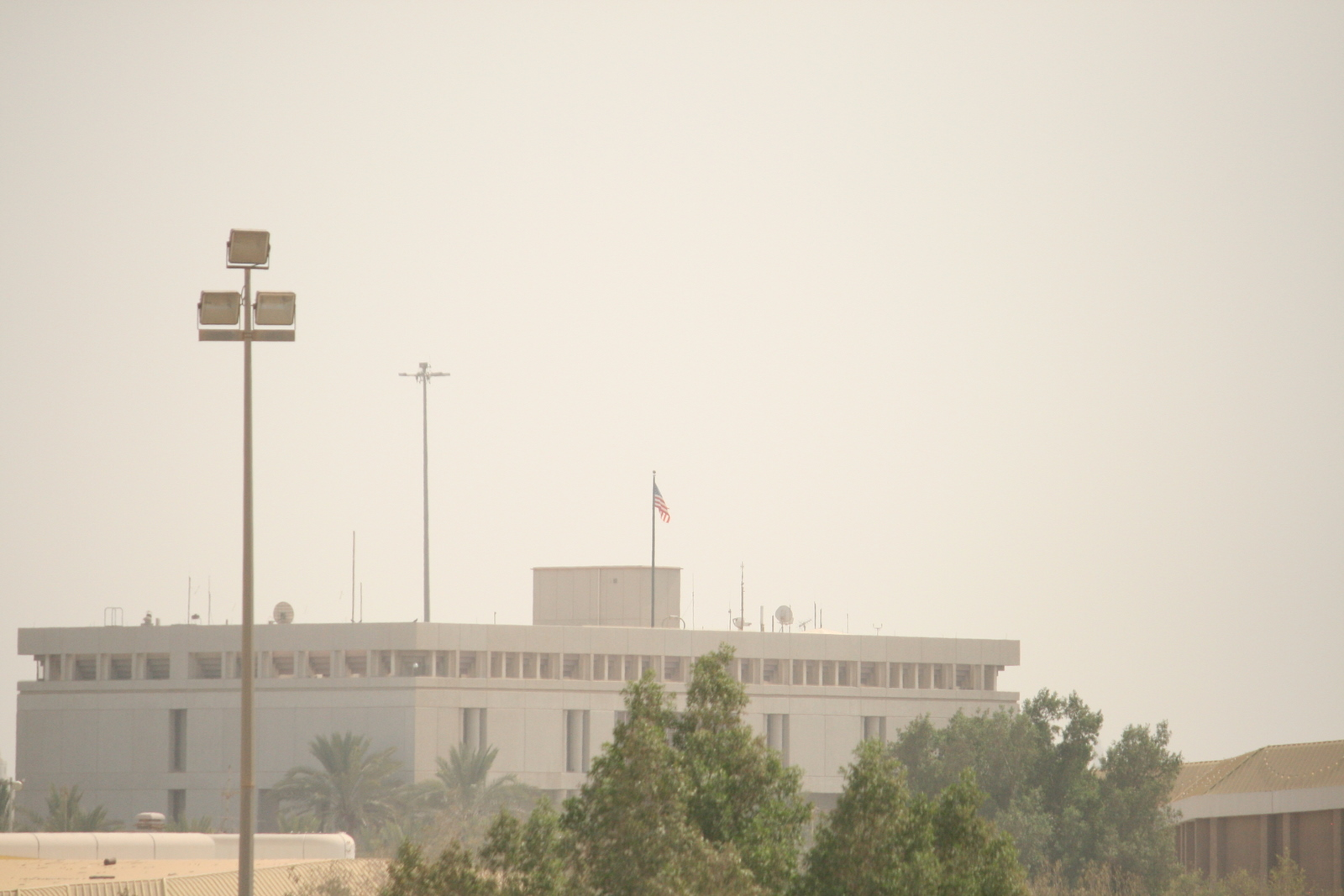
- Location: Zinj, Manama, Bahrain
- Address: Building 979, Road 3119, Block 331
- Coordinates: 26°12′17″N 50°34′15″E
- Ambassador: Stephanie L. Hallett
- Website: bh.usembassy.gov

The Embassy of the United States to Bahrain is the diplomatic mission of the United States in Bahrain. The building is located in Zinj, a district of the capital, Manama. The post of U.S. Ambassador to Bahrain is currently held by Stephanie L. Hallett.

The embassy is one of two major American installations in Bahrain, the other being Naval Support Activity Bahrain, a base which houses the main United States Navy operations in the Persian Gulf.

== History ==
The United States formally acknowledged the sovereignty of the State of Bahrain on August 15, 1971 coinciding with its independence from the British Empire.

Embassy Manama was officially inaugurated on September 21, 1971, with John N. Gatch, Jr. assuming the role of Chargé d'Affaires ad interim. The first official ambassador, William Stoltzfus, presented his credentials to the Bahraini government on February 17, 1972, while maintaining residence in Kuwait. It was not until 1974 that Ambassador Joseph W. Twinam submitted his credentials and became the first American ambassador to take up residence at Embassy Manama.

The embassy was dedicated on 4 July 1990 and occupied in December that year. The building was constructed in accordance with Department of State security requirements.

== Protests ==
Bahraini citizens and activists have protested outside of the embassy for various reasons, including anti-Iraq War demonstrations, the presence of the U.S. Navy's Fifth Fleet in Bahrain, and to protest Israeli actions in the Middle East. The U.S. had seen by some as a proxy for the Israeli government when Israel and Bahrain did not have diplomatic relations.

== See also ==
- Bahrain–United States relations
- Diplomatic missions in Bahrain
- Ambassadors of the United States to Bahrain
- Embassy of Bahrain, Washington, D.C.
- Ambassadors of Bahrain to the United States
