= Bahrain–United States relations =

- Bahrain: United States

Diplomatic mission
- Embassy of Bahrain, Washington, D.C.: Embassy of the United States, Manama

Envoy
- Ambassador of Bahrain to the United States Embassy of Bahrain, Washington, D.C. Abdullah Bin Rashid Al Khalifa: Ambassador of the United States to Bahrain Stephanie Hallett

Bahrain and the United States have been allies since Bahrain's independence in 1971 and have maintained close relations with shared economic and geopolitical interests.

== History ==
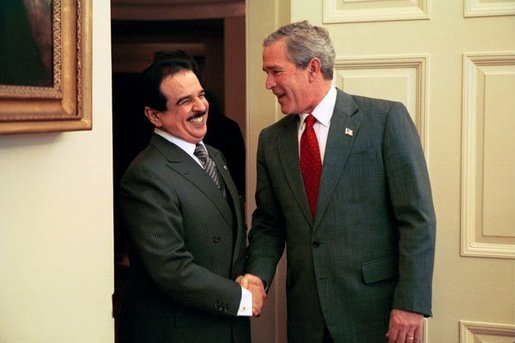
President George W. Bush welcomes King Hamad bin Isa Al Khalifa of Bahrain to the Oval Office on 29 November 2004

Since 1947, while still a British colony, Bahrain has been the location of a U.S. naval base, Naval Support Activity Bahrain. When Bahrain became independent in 1971, the US-Bahrain relationship was formalized with the establishment of diplomatic relations, initiated by the diplomatic recognition of Bahrain as a sovereign state by the U.S. on August 15. The U.S. embassy in Manama was opened on September 21, 1971, and the country's first resident ambassador, Joseph W. Twinam, was sent in 1974. The Bahraini embassy in Washington, D.C., opened in 1977.

In October 1991, Emir Isa bin Salman Al Khalifa made a state visit to Washington. In 2001, King Hamad bin Isa Al Khalifa made his first visit to the U.S. after succeeding his father in 1999. He returned to Washington on another working visit in January 2003. King Hamad made an official visit to Washington in November 2004, meeting President Bush and cabinet-level officials. In 2008, George W. Bush became the first sitting American President to visit Bahrain, on January 12 and 13, where he met King Hamad and addressed the American military personnel.

=== Defense Cooperation Agreement ===
Bahrain and the United States signed a Defense Cooperation Agreement in October 1991 granting U.S. forces access to Bahraini facilities and ensuring the right to pre-position material for future crises. Bahrain is the headquarters of the United States Navy's Fifth Fleet. The U.S. designated Bahrain as a Major non-NATO ally in 2002.

The American Mission Hospital, affiliated with the National Evangelical Church (Bahrain), has operated continuously in Bahrain for more than a century.

=== Free Trade Agreement ===
On September 14, 2004, both countries signed a free trade agreement. The agreement was ratified by the United States House of Representatives on December 7, 2005, by 327–95, with 10 abstentions, and passed by the United States Senate on December 13, 2005. President George W. Bush signed the USBFTA Implementation Act into law (Pub. L. 109–169 (text) (PDF)) on January 11, 2006. The FTA was implemented on August 1, 2006, and reduced certain barriers to trade between the two countries.

=== U.S.-brokered Abraham Accords ===
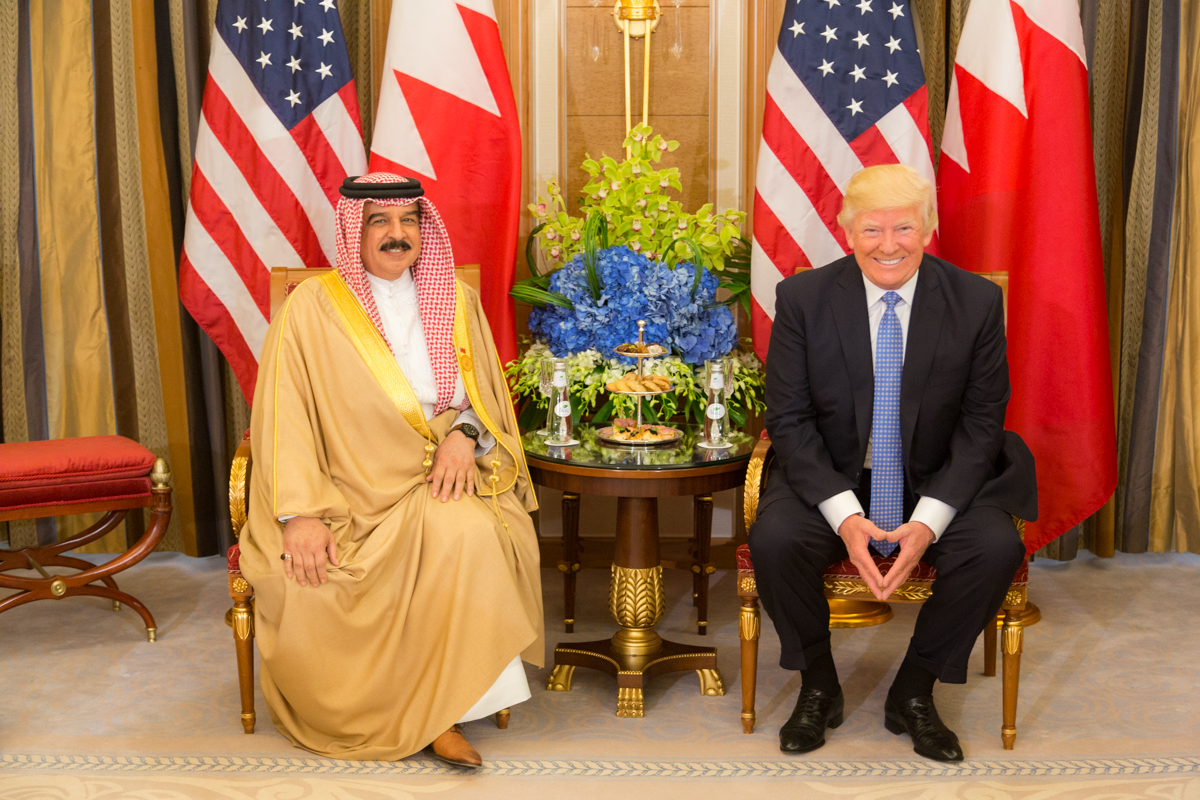
President Donald Trump with Hamad bin Isa Al Khalifa on May 21, 2017.

On September 11, 2020, the U.S. announced it had brokered the second agreement of the Abraham Accords between Bahrain and Israel. It was formally signed on September 15, 2020, at the White House in Washington, D.C., and made Bahrain the fourth Arab state to recognize Israel and the second within a month following the United Arab Emirates which signed its agreement with Israel in the same ceremony as Bahrain.

=== Expulsion of a visiting U.S. official ===
In July 2014, while visiting Bahrain, Assistant Secretary of State for Democracy, Human Rights, and Labor Tom Malinowski was expelled by the country's government after he met with members of Al Wefaq, a leading Bahraini opposition party. Malinowski was expected to visit Bahrain for three days, and had meetings scheduled with al-Wefaq, government officials, and a leading human rights activist, Nabeel Rajab. The foreign ministry of Bahrain argued that Malinowski's activities "ran counter to conventional diplomatic norms," but also noted that the expulsion would not affect Bahrain–United States relations. The government of Bahrain also demanded that a representative of its foreign ministry be present at private meetings between Malinowski and members of al-Wefaq, and claimed that before Malinowski's arrival, there was "prior agreement" on this matter.

Malinowski criticized the Bahrain government's decision as an attempt at "undermining dialogue." State Department Spokesperson Jen Psaki said that the U.S. was "deeply concerned" and that the Bahrain government's actions were "not consistent with the strong partnership between the United States and Bahrain." Secretary of State John Kerry called Bahrain's request to have a government official present at Malinowski's meetings "highly unusual" and an "unacceptable requirement that runs contrary to international diplomatic protocol."

Malinowski returned to Bahrain in December 2014, along with Assistant Secretary of State for Near Eastern Affairs Anne W. Patterson.

=== 2023 Strategic Security and Economic Agreement ===
On September 13, 2023, the United States and Bahrain signed a strategic security and economic agreement to expand defense and intelligence collaboration between the two countries.

=== 2024 missile attacks ===
In January 2024, Bahrain, the US, and other Western countries took part in the 2024 missile strikes in Yemen.

== See also ==
- Foreign relations of Bahrain
- Foreign relations of the United States
- Embassy of Bahrain, Washington, D.C.
- Embassy of the United States, Manama
- Ambassadors of Bahrain to the United States
- Ambassadors of the United States to Bahrain
- United States foreign policy in the Middle East
