= List of ambassadors of the United States to Bahrain =

Ambassador of the United States to Bahrain
- سفير الولايات المتحدة في مملكة البحرين
- Seal of the United States Department of State

- Flag of a United States ambassador

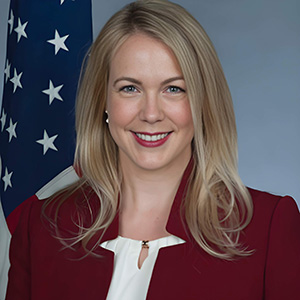
- Incumbent; Stephanie Hallett since January 21, 2026
- Nominator: The president of the United States
- Appointer: The president with Senate advice and consent
- Inaugural holder: John N. Gatch Jr.
- Formation: 1971
- Website: bh.usembassy.gov

The United States ambassador to Bahrain is the official representative of the president of the United States to the head of state of Bahrain.

Until 1971, Bahrain had been part of a British protectorate along with the other sheikhdoms in the Persian Gulf. In 1971 the protectorate ended and seven of the other sheikhdoms joined in a federation to become the United Arab Emirates. Bahrain, however, did not join the federation but declared its independence on 15 August 1971. The United States recognized the State of Bahrain on the same day and moved to establish diplomatic relations.

The U.S. Embassy in Manama was opened on 21 September 1971, with John N. Gatch, Jr. as Chargé d'Affaires ad interim. Ambassador William A. Stoltzfus, Jr. presented his credentials to the government of Bahrain on 17 February 1972. Stoltzfus was concurrently the ambassador to Kuwait, Qatar, Oman, and the United Arab Emirates, while resident in Kuwait. The first ambassador commissioned solely to Bahrain was Joseph W. Twinam in 1974.

== Ambassadors and chiefs of mission ==
Name	Title	Appointed	Presented credentials	Terminated mission	Notes
John N. Gatch, Jr. – Career FSO	Chargé d'Affaires ad interim	21 September 1971		17 February 1972	
William Stoltzfus – Career FSO	Ambassador Extraordinary and Plenipotentiary	9 December 1971	17 February 1972	9 June 1974	
Joseph W. Twinam – Career FSO	Ambassador Extraordinary and Plenipotentiary	24 May 1974	10 June 1974	10 August 1976	
Wat T. Cluverius IV – Career FSO	Ambassador Extraordinary and Plenipotentiary	4 October 1976	23 October 1976	2 August 1978	
Robert Pelletreau – Career FSO	Ambassador Extraordinary and Plenipotentiary	9 February 1979	10 March 1979	3 April 1980	
Peter Adams Sutherland – Career FSO	Ambassador Extraordinary and Plenipotentiary	30 June 1980	12 July 1980	1 September 1983	
Donald C. Leidel – Career FSO	Ambassador Extraordinary and Plenipotentiary	7 October 1983	12 November 1983	1 October 1986	
Sam H. Zakhem – Political appointee	Ambassador Extraordinary and Plenipotentiary	12 September 1986	6 October 1986	1 August 1989	
Charles Warren Hostler – Political appointee	Ambassador Extraordinary and Plenipotentiary	10 October 1989	28 October 1989	1 March 1993	
David S. Robins – Career FSO	Chargé d'Affaires ad interim	1 March 1993		18 July 1994	
David M. Ransom – Career FSO	Ambassador Extraordinary and Plenipotentiary	5 July 1994	18 July 1994	28 July 1997	
Johnny Young – Career FSO	Ambassador Extraordinary and Plenipotentiary	7 November 1997	11 December 1997	29 September 2001	
Ronald E. Neumann – Career FSO	Ambassador Extraordinary and Plenipotentiary	17 September 2001	9 October 2001	7 June 2004	
William T. Monroe – Career FSO	Ambassador Extraordinary and Plenipotentiary	2 July 2004	31 August 2004	5 August 2007	
J. Adam Ereli – Political appointee	Ambassador Extraordinary and Plenipotentiary	2 July 2007	12 September 2007	14 January 2011	
Thomas C. Krajeski - Career FSO	Ambassador Extraordinary and Plenipotentiary	26 October 2011	22 November 2011	15 December 2014	
William V. Roebuck - Career FSO	Ambassador Extraordinary and Plenipotentiary	18 November 2014	20 January 2015	31 October 2017	
Justin Siberell - Career FSO	Ambassador Extraordinary and Plenipotentiary	27 July 2017	12 November 2017	13 July 2020	
Maggie Nardi	Chargé d'Affaires ad interim	13 July 2020		9 February 2022	
Steven C. Bondy	Ambassador Extraordinary and Plenipotentiary	18 December 2021	9 February 2022	14 September 2025	
Elizabeth A. Litchfield	Chargé d'affaires ad interim	15 September 2025		8 January 2026	
Stephanie Hallett	Ambassador Extraordinary and Plenipotentiary	7 October 2025	20 January 2026	Incumbent	

== See also ==
- Bahrain–United States relations
- Embassy of the United States, Manama
- Ambassadors of Bahrain to the United States
- Embassy of Bahrain, Washington, D.C.
