= List of ambassadors of Bahrain to the United States =

Coordinates: 38°56′28.5″N 77°3′57″W

Ambassador of Bahrain to United States Embassy of Bahrain, Washington, D.C.
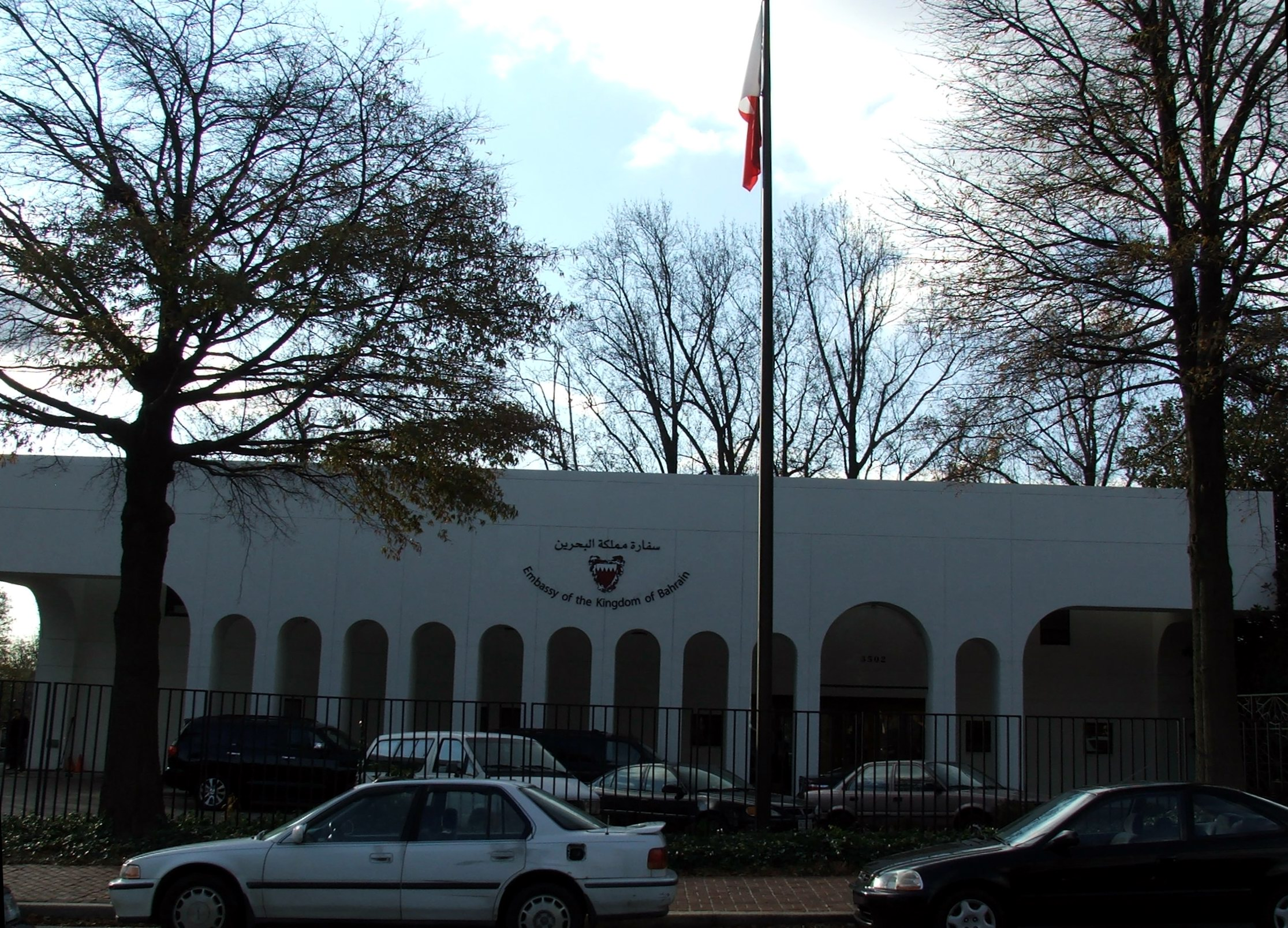
- Incumbent; Abdullah Bin Rashid Al Khalifa since November 26, 2013
- Inaugural holder: Abdulaziz Abdulrahman Buali
- Formation: August 23, 1976

The Bahraini ambassador in Washington, D. C. is the official representative of the Government in Manama to the Government of the United States.

== List of representatives ==
Diplomatic agrément	Diplomatic accreditation	ambassador	Observations	Prime Minister of Bahrain	List of presidents of the United States	Term end
August 15, 1971		The government of Richard Nixon announces the recognition of the government of Khalifa bin Salman Al Khalifa		Khalifa bin Salman Al Khalifa	Richard Nixon	
August 23, 1976	November 18, 1976	Abdulaziz Abdulrahman Buali	(* 1939) Buali, Abdulaziz Abdulrahman. Ambassador to USA, Embassy of Bahrain, Bahrain. Hedd, Bahrain November 29, 1939. University of Baghdad, B.A. Reading Univ., England. Diploma for Graduate Studies. High School Principal, Bahrain, In 1972, Buali had been appointed to serve as Bahrain's first Ambassador to Iran."	Khalifa bin Salman Al Khalifa	Gerald Ford	
November 23, 1984	December 10, 1984	Ghazi Muhammed Al-Gosaibi		Khalifa bin Salman Al Khalifa	Ronald Reagan	
November 14, 1991	November 25, 1991	Abdul Rahman bin Fares Al Khalifa	(* 1942) studied at the University of Cairo.: In 1971 joined Ministry of Foreign Affairs, Dir of Admin, Financial, Legal and Consular divisions, Chief of Protocol, From 1993 to 2001 he was Ambassador to the Court of St James’s with concurrent accreditation to Ireland and Denmark.; From 1990 to 1991 he was chairman of the Joint Governmental Committee.; He married Shaikha Latifa bint Salman al-Khalifa. He has issue, one son and five daughters.	Khalifa bin Salman Al Khalifa	George H. W. Bush	
January 14, 1994	February 14, 1994	Muhammad Abdul Ghaffar Abdulla		Khalifa bin Salman Al Khalifa	Bill Clinton	
September 26, 2001	October 10, 2001	Khalifa Ali Khalifa	minister of foreign Affairs	Khalifa bin Salman Al Khalifa	George W. Bush	
January 1, 2002			The name of the state was changed by constitutional referendum from “The State of Bahrain” to “The Kingdom of Bahrain”	Khalifa bin Salman Al Khalifa	George W. Bush	
September 7, 2005	October 3, 2005	Naser Mohamed Yusaf Albalooshi		Khalifa bin Salman Al Khalifa	George W. Bush	
July 24, 2008	July 28, 2008	Houda Nonoo		Khalifa bin Salman Al Khalifa	George W. Bush	
November 26, 2013	December 3, 2013	Abdullah Bin Mohammad Bin Rashed Al Khalifa		Khalifa bin Salman Al Khalifa	Barack Obama and Donald Trump	
	July 22, 2017	Abdullah Bin Rashid Al Khalifa		Khalifa bin Salman Al Khalifa and Salman bin Hamad bin Isa Al Khalifa	Donald Trump and Joe Biden	

== See also ==
- Bahrain–United States relations
- Embassy of Bahrain, Washington, D.C.
- Ambassadors of the United States to Bahrain
- Embassy of the United States, Manama
