= Abdullah bin Mohammad bin Rashed Al Khalifa =

Bahraini diplomat and air force officer

- عبد الله بن محمد بن راشد آل خليفة

Ambassador of Bahrain to the United States
- In office 3 December 2013 – 2017
- Monarch: Hamad bin Isa Al Khalifa
- Preceded by: Houda Nonoo
- Succeeded by: Abdullah bin Rashid Al Khalifa

Personal details
- Relatives: House of Khalifa
- Awards: Freedom of Kuwait Medal (two)

Military service
- Allegiance: Bahrain
- Branch/service: Royal Bahraini Air Force
- Years of service: 1988–2013
- Rank: Colonel
- Battles/wars: Gulf War

Abdullah bin Mohammad bin Rashed Al Khalifa (Arabic: عبد الله بن محمد بن راشد آل خليفة) is a Bahraini air force officer and diplomat, a member of the House of Khalifa. A fighter pilot in the Royal Bahraini Air Force from 1988, he served as Bahrain's defence attaché in Washington, D.C. from 2005 to 2013 and as Bahrain's ambassador to the United States from December 2013 until 2017.

His name is transliterated variously in English-language sources, including "Abdulla Bin Mohamed Rashid Al-Khalifa" and "Abdulla Bin Mohamed Al-Khalifa". He is a different person from his successor as ambassador, Abdullah bin Rashid Al Khalifa.

== Military career ==
=== Fighter pilot ===
He joined the Royal Bahraini Air Force in 1988 and trained as a fighter pilot. He flew the F-5 and the F-16. The Washington Diplomat reports that he received the best fighter pilot award from the Royal Air Force College Cranwell in 1990.

=== Gulf War and Iraq War ===
He took an active part in the 1991 operations to liberate Kuwait during the Gulf War, and later served as a mission commander flying over Kuwait during the Iraq War. He took part in 25 military and leadership courses in Bahrain, Kuwait, the United States and the United Kingdom. He held the rank of lieutenant colonel when his nomination as ambassador was reported in September 2013, and is described as a colonel in later profiles.

=== Decorations ===
His decorations include two Freedom of Kuwait medals, the Long Service Medal, the Hawar Medal and the Freedom of Iraq Medal.

== Diplomatic career ==
=== Military attaché in Washington ===
From 2005 to 2013 he was Bahrain's defence, military, naval and air attaché in the United States, and was also accredited as a non-resident attaché to Canada. In March 2013 he led the Bahraini delegation to the final United Nations conference on the Arms Trade Treaty in New York.

=== Ambassador to the United States ===
In September 2013 The Washington Institute for Near East Policy reported that Bahrain had nominated him to succeed Houda Nonoo, who had been ambassador since 2008, and that the appointment awaited approval by the US administration; it described him as a long-serving defence attaché and a relative of the ruler. The International House at the University of Chicago states that he was appointed by Royal Decree No. 66 of 15 September 2013. The Washington Diplomat gives 3 December 2013 as the date he became ambassador.

In October 2014 he was the guest of the International House's "Diplomatic Encounters" speaker series at the University of Chicago. His successor, Abdullah bin Rashid Al Khalifa, presented his credentials in July 2017. Published sources do not give the exact date on which his own tenure ended.

== See also ==
- List of ambassadors of Bahrain to the United States
- Bahrain–United States relations
- House of Khalifa
