= Sam H. Zakhem =

American politician (born 1935)

Sam Zakhem

United States Ambassador to Bahrain
- In office October 6, 1986 – August 1, 1989
- President: Ronald Reagan; George H. W. Bush
- Preceded by: Donald Leidel
- Succeeded by: Charles Hostler

Personal details
- Born: November 25, 1935 (age 90) Lebanon
- Party: Republican
- Education: The American University in Cairo; University of Detroit; University of Colorado
- Profession: Professor; Politician

Sam Hanna Zakhem (born November 25, 1935) is a Lebanese-born American politician and diplomat who served as a member of the Colorado General Assembly, and later as the U.S. Ambassador Extraordinary and Plenipotentiary to Bahrain.

== Biography ==
Zakhem was born to a wealthy family in Lebanon but his father disinherited him when he emigrated to the United States. He came to the US after graduating from the American University in Cairo in 1957. He went on to graduate with a master's degree in economics at the University of Detroit. Zakhem returned to Lebanon but did not stay long. In 1965, he moved to Denver and worked various jobs while studying political science at the University of Colorado Boulder's graduate school, graduating with a Ph.D. He has a wife Merilynn and three sons.

== Colorado General Assembly ==
Zakhem was elected twice to the Colorado House of Representatives (1974 and 1976) and was elected to the Colorado Senate in 1978. In the House, he sat on the Committee on Game Fish & Parks and the Committee on Local Government State Affairs and in the Senate, he sat on the Committee Business Affairs & Labor Finance and the Committee on Health Environment Welfare & Institutions.

While a member of the Colorado General Assembly, Zakhem ran for higher office on two occasions. In 1980, he ran for US Senate. He lost the nomination to Mary Estill Buchanan, the incumbent Colorado Secretary of State. In 1982, Buchanan chose not to run for reelection as Secretary of State. Zakhem ran for the nomination, losing in the primary to Natalie Meyer.

== Ambassadorship ==
Zakhem’s fundraising for conservative political causes was part of the reason Ronald Reagan appointed him as Ambassador in 1986. The State Department was not impressed because “ his resume lacked foreign affairs expertise, and one State Department observer labeled him an "amateur" dangerously miscast in the hot-spot of Middle East politics.”

At the time of his appointment, some said he was the most dangerous person in the Middle East. Bahrain served as “the de facto headquarters for the biggest U.S. naval armada assembled since World War II.”

Zakhem considered himself “a leading expert on Arab matters.” Deputy Secretary of State John Whitehead recalled him once for dealing with the Bahraini Government outside of official channels. He also argued with CIA analysts over whether or not the family ruling Bahrain would be overthrown by the pro-Iranian Shiite majority in the country. It turned out Zakhem was right. He has also been criticized for his role in the sale of an advanced anti-aircraft missile, the Stinger, which are portable and shoulder-launched.

== Post-ambassadorship ==
In 1992, Zakhem and two other men were indicted and "charged with secretly accepting $7.7 million from the Government of Kuwait to act as undisclosed foreign agents in a 'propaganda campaign' to generate support for the war against Iraq." According to the indictment, the men failed to report the money, a violation of Federal tax laws, and while lobbying the US Congress and Administration, did not disclose their status as Kuwaiti agents, a violation of the Foreign Agents Registration Act. In 1994, charges were dismissed except for the charges of tax fraud. In March, 1995, he and his co-defendants were acquitted on those charges.

In 2002, he ran for the United States House of Representatives from the newly-created Colorado's 7th congressional district. He lost the nomination to Bob Beauprez and finished third of four candidates in the Republican primary.

Diplomatic posts
Preceded by Donald C. Leidel	United States Ambassador to Bahrain; 1986–1989	Succeeded by Charles Warren Hostler
