= Muhammad Abdul Ghaffar Abdulla =

Bahraini ambassador

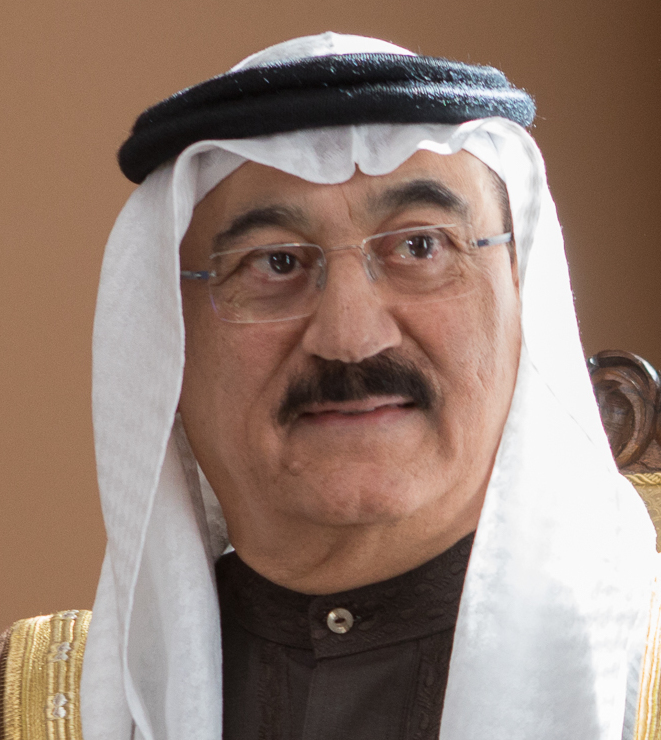

Bahraini Permanent Representative to the United Nations of Bahrain to United Nations
- In office August 1990 – February 14, 1994
- Preceded by: Karim Ebrahim Al-Shakar
- Succeeded by: Jassim Mohammed Buallay

Bahraini ambassador to the United States of Bahrain to United States
- In office February 14, 1994 – July 12, 2001
- Preceded by: Abdul Rahman bin Fares Khalifa
- Succeeded by: Khalifa Ali Khalifa

Bahraini Ambassador to Belgium of Bahrain to Belgium
- In office September 16, 2008 – 2009
- Succeeded by: January 19, 2012: Ahmed Mohamed Yousif Aldoseri; August 20, 2015: Bahia Jawad Al-Jishi

Bahraini Ambassador to France of Bahrain to France
- Incumbent
- Assumed office September 9, 2015
- Preceded by: Naser Al Belooshi

Personal details
- Born: January 15, 1949 (age 77) Manama
- Education: In 1974 Bachelor's degree in political science from Savitribai Phule Pune University Poona, India.; In 1981 Master’s degree in political science from the New School for Social Research in New York.; In 1991 Ph.D. in political science from Binghamton University.

Muhammad Abdul Ghaffar Abdulla (born 15 January 1949) is a Bahraini ambassador.

== Career ==
Ghaffar Abdulla joined the foreign Service in 1975. From 1977 to 1979 he was employed at the Embassy in Amman, Jordan. From 1979 to 1984 he was a member of Bahrain's delegation to the UN General Assembly, and took part in the Gulf Cooperation Council Summit Conferences, as well as those of the Arab League and Non-Aligned Nations. From August 1990 to 1994 he was Bahrain's Permanent Representative united at the United Nations headquarters. From 1994 to April 2001 he was Ambassador in Washington, D.C., with concurrent Diplomatic accreditation to Ottawa (Canada) from 1996 and Buenos Aires (Argentina) from 1998.

He was appointed Minister of State for Foreign Affairs (a rank comparable to deputy secretary of state) three times, on 17 April 2001, 11 November 2003, and again on 14 January 2005. He was appointed Minister of Information on 11 December 2006.

From 2008 to 2009 he was Ambassador in Brussels (Belgium) and concurrent representative to the European Union and non-resident Ambassador to Luxembourg. From 9 December 2009 to 5 February 2015 he was Chairman of the Board of Trustees for the Bahrain Center for Strategic, International and Energy Studies. From 29 June 2009 to 6 December 2014 he was an Advisor for Diplomatic Affairs to Hamad bin Isa Al Khalifa (Royal Decree n°57) Since September 9, 2015 he has been Bahrain's ambassador in Paris.
