= Morris Draper =

American diplomat

U.S. Consul General in Jerusalem
- In office 1986–1988
- President: Ronald Reagan
- Preceded by: Wat T. Cluverius IV
- Succeeded by: Philip Wilcox Jr.

Morris Draper (February 18, 1928-April 2005) was a US diplomat who served as United States Consul General in Jerusalem from February 1986 to 1988.

He also served as Deputy Assistant Secretary of State for Near Eastern Affairs and participated in the Camp David Peace Accorda negotiations in 1979.

== Biography ==
Draper, born February 18, 1928, in San Francisco, attended the University of Southern California. The New York Times said the University of California.
