= Tawfeeq Ahmed Almansoor =

Bahraini diplomat

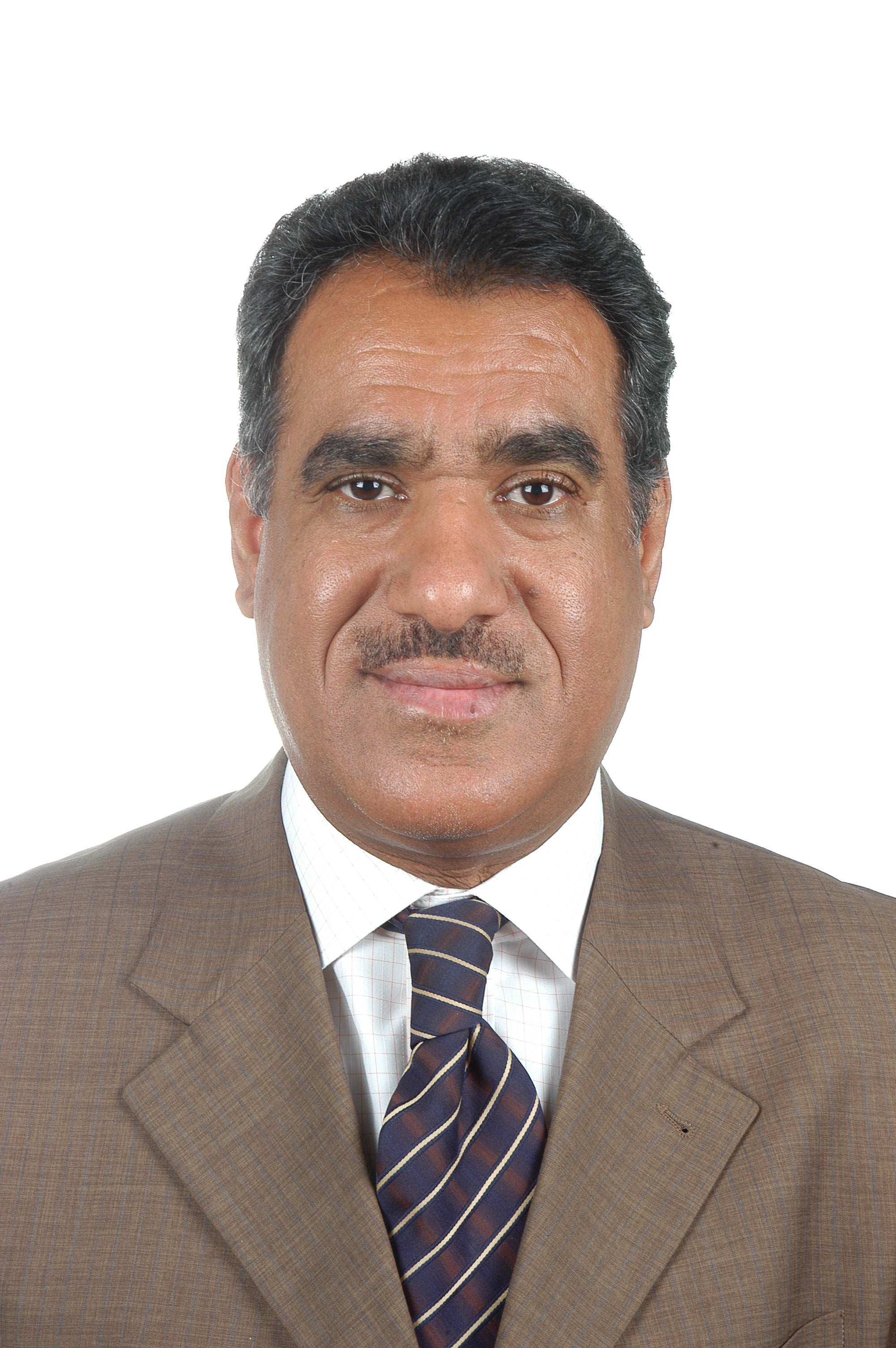
- Born: November 14, 1957 (age 68); Bahrain
- Occupation: Diplomat

Tawfeeq Ahmed Khalil Almansoor (Arabic: توفيق أحمد خليل المنصور; born 14 November 1957) is a Bahraini diplomat. He served as the permanent Ambassador to the United Nations for Bahrain from 2003 to 2011. He presented his credentials to the Secretary-General of the United Nations Kofi Annan on 21 May 2003. He also served as Vice-President of the General Assembly of the United Nations.

== Biography ==
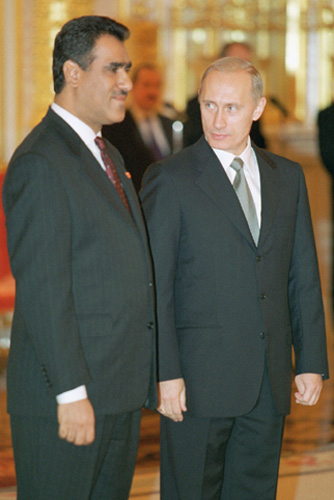
Tawfeeq Almansoor with Russian president Vladimir Putin in 2001.

Tawfeel Almansoor was born in Bahrain on the 14th of November, 1957. He obtained a bachelor's degree in law at Cairo University in 1980 as well as a diploma in international law from The Hague Academy of International Law in 1988. He joined the country's Ministry of Foreign Affair's in 1981, working under the legal directorate until 1990.

Since 1990, he has worked as first secretary for the Bahraini embassy in Washington DC. From 1995 to 1999, he became the first secretary of Bahrain's mission to the United Nations wherein he represented Bahrain at the UN General Assembly three times (1997—1999) and the UN Security Council after the country was voted into the council in 1997. In 1999, he was awarded a master's degree in international relations from St John's University, New York. From August 1999 to 2001, he was reassigned as deputy chief of the Bahraini embassy in Cairo, Egypt. As part of his tenure, he represented Bahrain at various Arab League summits during this time.

In September 2001, he was appointed as ambassador of Bahrain to the Russian Federation, a position he held until May 2003 when he became the Bahraini ambassador to the United Nations. One of his duties include promoting Bahrain through Arab states. Almansoor was appointed as the permanent representative to the United Nations for the Kingdom of Bahrain in 2003 and remained at this post until 2011. He currently servies as Assistant Undersecretary for Western Countries & Afro-Asian Affairs at the Bahraini foreign ministry.
