= Edward Abington Jr. =

American consul (born 1943)

U.S. Consul General in Jerusalem
- In office 1993–1997
- President: Bill Clinton
- Preceded by: Molly Williamson
- Succeeded by: John E. Herbst

Personal details
- Born: March 4, 1943 (age 83) Lubbock, Texas, U.S.
- Education: University of Florida, Gainesville

Edward Gordon Abington Jr. (born March 4, 1943) is a retired US diplomat who served as U.S. consul general in Jerusalem from 1993–1997. His posting coincided with the Oslo peace process. Abington was the key U.S. contact with Yasser Arafat and saw Arafat over 200 times from 1994 to early 1997. Abington has a daughter, Alex, whom he used to bring on trips to visit the Arafat family. He also served as deputy assistant secretary at the Bureau of Intelligence and Research, United States Department of State.

In 1999, Abington, working at Bannerman & Associates, became an adviser and lobbyist to the Palestinian Authority. The initial contract was $2.25 million for three years. After Hamas defeated Fatah in the 2006 Palestinian legislative election, Abington consulted only for President Mahmoud Abbas. That latter lobbying relationship ended in January 2007.

From 2007–2008, Abington was a witness for the defense in the U.S. government's prosecution of the Holy Land Foundation for Relief and Development.
