= Frank E. Maestrone =

American diplomat

Frank Eusebio Maestrone
- Born: December 20, 1922; Springfield, Massachusetts, United States
- Died: May 22, 2007 (age 84); La Jolla, California, United States
- Occupation: Ambassador

Frank Eusebio Maestrone (December 20, 1922 – May 22, 2007) served as United States Ambassador to Kuwait from 1976 to 1979. He entered the foreign service in 1948. Born in Springfield, Massachusetts, he eventually retired to San Diego, California. In his retirement, he served as a board member of the San Diego World Affairs Council.

Maestrone died on May 22, 2007, after a brief infection.

Diplomatic posts
| Preceded by William A. Stoltzfus, Jr. | United States Ambassador to Kuwait; 1976–1979 | Succeeded by Francois M. Dickman |
