= List of ambassadors of Bahrain to France =

Coordinates: 48.867639°N 2.294389°E

Ambassador of Bahrain to France
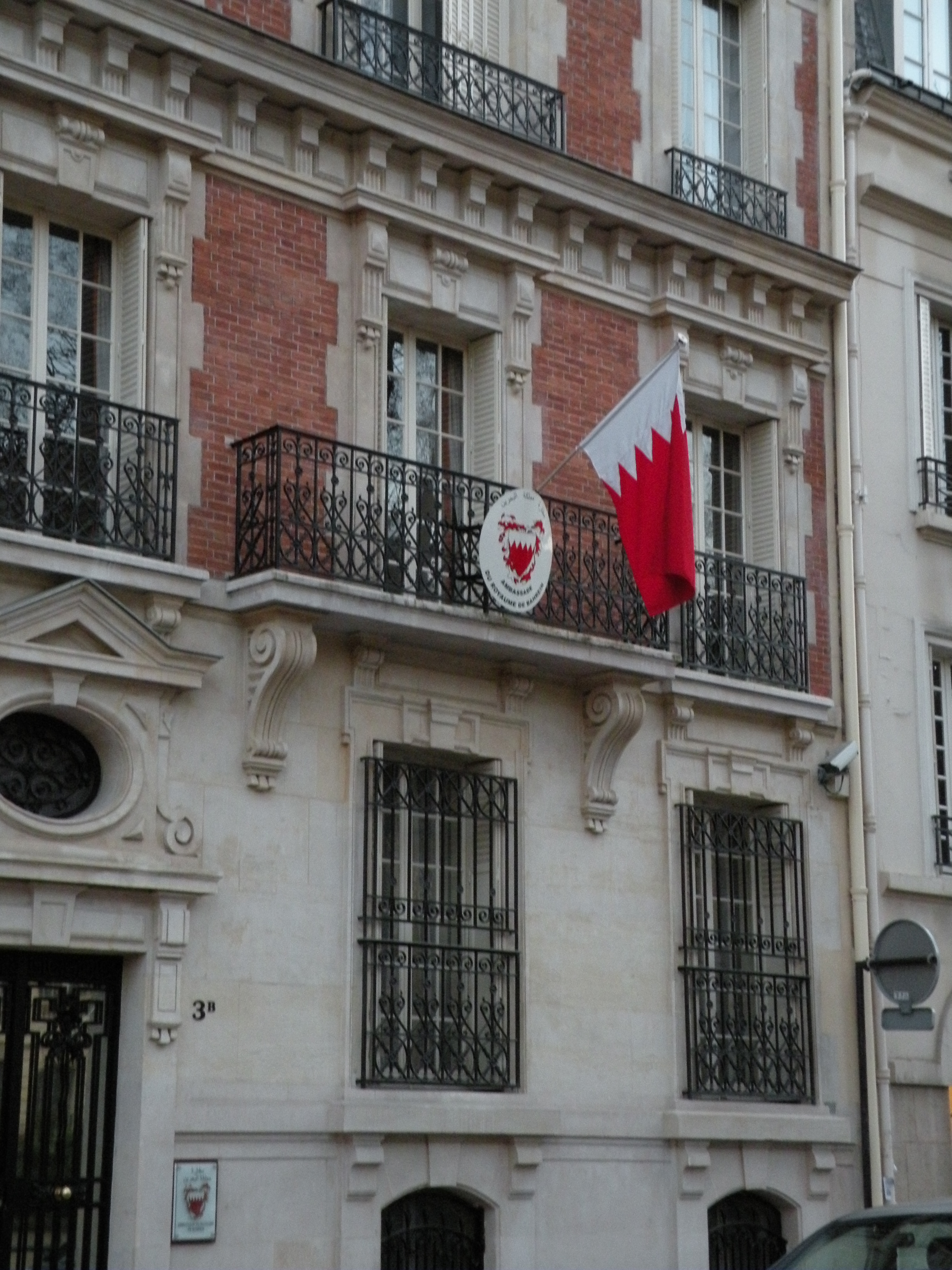
- Incumbent; Muhammad Abdul Ghaffar Abdulla since September 8, 2015
- Inaugural holder: Jassim Mohammed Buallay
- Formation: February 24, 1976

The Bahraini ambassador in Paris is the official representative of the Government in Manama to the Government of France.

- He has concurrent Diplomatic accreditation as Permanent Representative to the UNESCO and since 2008 to the Holy See.

== List of representatives ==
Diplomatic accreditation	Ambassador	Observations	Prime Minister of Bahrain	List of presidents of France	Term end
February 24, 1976	Jassim Mohammed Buallay	(Note: Remise de lettres de créance, JORF n°48 du 26 février 1976, p.1302.)	Khalifa bin Salman Al Khalifa	Valéry Giscard d’Estaing	
December 13, 1979	Salman Abdul Wahab al Sabagh	(Note: Remise de lettres de créance, JORF n°291 du 15 décembre 1979, p.3166.)	Khalifa bin Salman Al Khalifa	Valéry Giscard d’Estaing	
November 9, 1982	Salman Al Saffar	(Note: Remise de lettres de créance, JORF n°263 du 11 novembre 1982, p.3390.)	Khalifa bin Salman Al Khalifa	François Mitterrand	
January 12, 1989	Abdulaziz Buali	(Note: Remise de lettres de créance, JORF n°12 du 14 janvier 1989, p.559,Système NOR MAEP8850000E.)	Khalifa bin Salman Al Khalifa	François Mitterrand	
December 16, 1991	Ali Ebrahim Al-Mahroos	(Note: Remise de lettres de créance, JORF n°294 du 18 décembre 1991,Système NOR MAEP9150065E.)	Khalifa bin Salman Al Khalifa	François Mitterrand	
December 6, 1995	Ali Mohamed Fakhro	(Note: Remise de lettres de créance, JORF n°285 du 8 décembre 1995, p.17903,Système NOR MAEP9550032G.)	Khalifa bin Salman Al Khalifa	Jacques Chirac	
March 13, 2000	Haya Rashed Al-Khalifa	(Note: Remise de lettres de créance, JORF n°63 du 15 mars 2000, p.4035,Système NOR MAEP0050007G.)	Khalifa bin Salman Al Khalifa	Jacques Chirac	
October 12, 2005	Hashem Hasan Albash	(Note: Remise de lettres de créance, JORF n°240 du 14 octobre 2005, p.16299, texte n°8,Système NOR MAEP0550100G.)	Khalifa bin Salman Al Khalifa	Jacques Chirac	
September 15, 2008	Naser Al Belooshi	(Note: Remise de lettres de créance, JORF n°217 du 17 septembre 2008, p.14287, texte n°1,Système NOR MAEP0850067G.)	Khalifa bin Salman Al Khalifa	Nicolas Sarkozy	
September 8, 2015	Muhammad Abdul Ghaffar Abdulla	(*January 15, 1949 in Manama) (Note: Remise de lettres de créance, JORF n°212 du 13 septembre 2015, p.15991, texte n°1,Système NOR MAEP1521005X.)	Khalifa bin Salman Al Khalifa	François Hollande	
