= Justin Siberell =

American diplomat (born 1966)

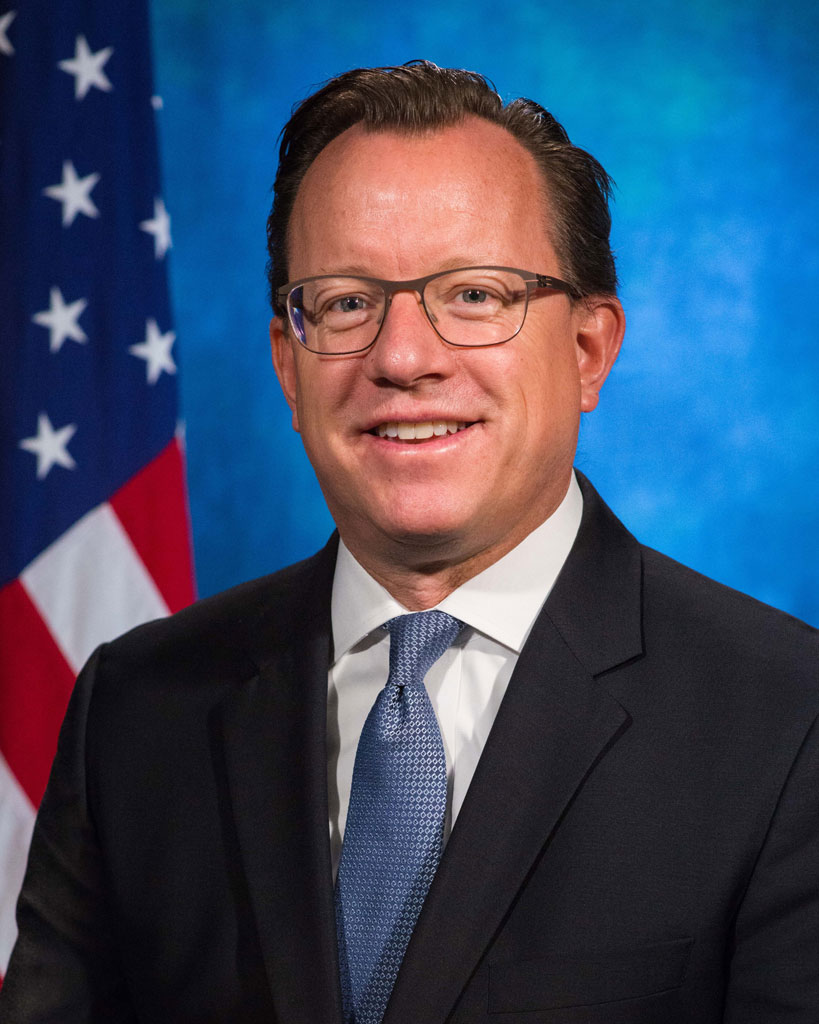

United States Ambassador to Bahrain
- In office November 12, 2017 – July 13, 2020
- President: Donald Trump
- Preceded by: William Roebuck
- Succeeded by: Steven C. Bondy

Personal details
- Born: 1966 (age 59–60)
- Education: University of California, Berkeley
- Occupation: Diplomat

Justin Hicks Siberell (born 1966) is an American diplomat who served as the United States Ambassador to Bahrain from 2017 to 2020.

== Early life and education ==
Originally from California, Siberell received a Bachelor of Arts degree in history from the University of California, Berkeley, and joined the United States Foreign Service in 1993.

== Career ==
Siberell is a career member of the Senior Foreign Service, with the rank of Minister-Counselor. Siberell served in embassy and consulate postings in Iraq, Jordan, Egypt, and Panama, and as United States Consul General in Dubai. In 2012 he was assigned to the U.S. Department of State's Counter Terrorism Bureau. By 2016 he headed the bureau as Acting Coordinator of Counter Terrorism and, that year, led discussions with Chinese assistant foreign minister Li Huilai on bilateral counter-terrorism cooperation.

=== Ambassador to Bahrain ===
On July 27, 2017, Siberell was formally nominated by President Donald Trump as United States Ambassador to Bahrain. On September 28, the Senate confirmed his nomination. Siberell was sworn in on November 3, 2017, and presented his credentials on November 12, 2017. His mission terminated on July 13, 2020.

=== Later roles ===
After his retirement from the Foreign Service, Siberell became a lobbyist for the Bechtel corporation, with responsibility for Europe and the Middle East region.

== Personal life ==
Siberell is married with three children. He speaks Spanish and Arabic.

Diplomatic posts
Preceded by William V. Roebuck	United States Ambassador to Bahrain; 2017–2020	Succeeded by Steven C. Bondy
