= William V. Roebuck =

American diplomat (born 1954)

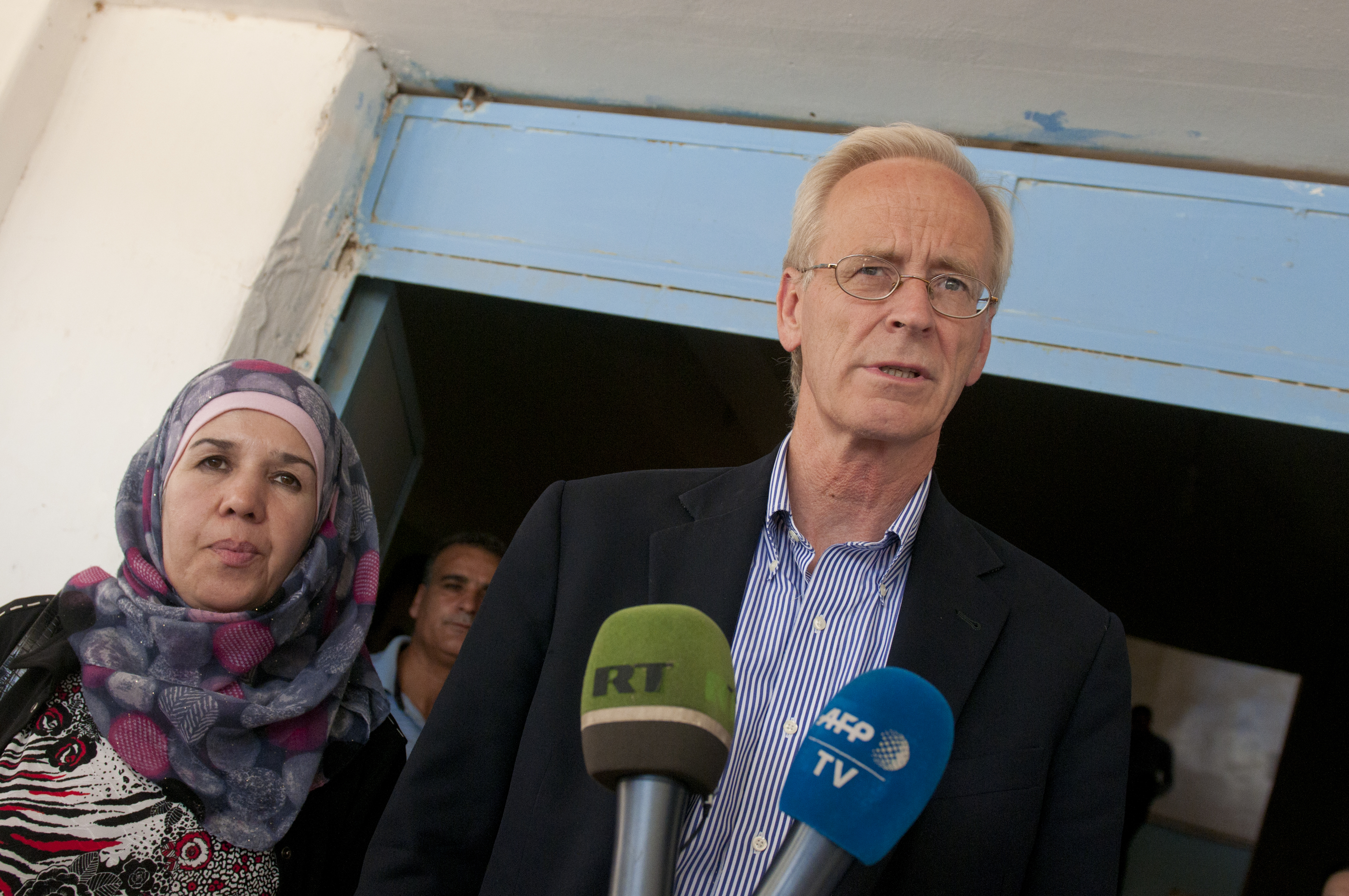
- Roebuck in Al-Shaddadah, Syria, August 25, 2018.

United States Ambassador to Bahrain
- In office January 20, 2015 – October 31, 2017
- President: Barack Obama; Donald Trump
- Preceded by: Thomas C. Krajeski
- Succeeded by: Justin Siberell

Personal details
- Born: 1954 (age 71–72)
- Education: Wake Forest University (BA, MA); University of Georgia School of Law (JD)
- Occupation: Lawyer, diplomat

William V. Roebuck (born 1954) is the executive vice president of the Arab Gulf States Institute in Washington. He most recently served as the deputy special envoy to the Global Coalition to Defeat ISIS and a senior advisor to the Special Representative for Syria Engagement Ambassador James Jeffrey. He is a former United States Ambassador to Bahrain, serving under presidents Obama and Trump.

== Early life ==
Roebuck is from Rocky Mount, North Carolina, and graduated from high school in 1974. He subsequently attended Wake Forest University, earning bachelor's and master's degrees in English. He served in the Peace Corps in Côte d'Ivoire and taught English in Saudi Arabia before attending the University of Georgia School of Law, graduating in 1992 and joining the Foreign Service that year.

== Career ==
After law school, Roebuck was posted throughout the Middle East and served as the acting U.S. Ambassador to Libya after Ambassador J. Christopher Stevens was killed. He was confirmed as Ambassador to Bahrain on November 18, 2014, and presented his credentials on January 20, 2015. He succeeded Thomas C. Krajeski and was succeeded by Justin Siberell.

=== Activities in Syria ===
In August 2018, State Department representative Roebuck traveled to the cities of Manbij and Kobani, both situated in Aleppo Governorate, as well as the town of Al-Shaddadah in Hasakah Governorate. He was later due to visit Deir ez-Zor Governorate which is held by U.S.-backed Kurdish forces. "We are prepared to stay here, as the president Donald Trump has made clear," he said after meeting with Democratic Federation of Northern Syria.

==== Criticisms of Turkish intervention ====
In November 2019, Roebuck "criticized the Trump administration for not trying harder to prevent Turkey’s military offensive" in northern Syria.

In November 2019, The New York Times reported that Roebuck, the senior U.S. diplomat in Syria, drafted a memorandum to the U.S. Special Envoy to Syria James Jeffrey that stated directly that the U.S. should have done more to stop the Turkish invasion into Syria. He said "Turkey’s military operation in northern Syria, spearheaded by armed Islamist groups on its payroll, represents an intentioned-laced effort at ethnic cleansing and what can only be described as war crimes and ethnic cleansing." He also warned that "we — with our local partners — have lost significant leverage and inherited a shrunken, less stable platform to support both our CT efforts and the mission of finding a comprehensive political solution for Syria."

==== Exit interview ====
In an interview with Defense One at the end of his career Roebuck commented on several areas. On Syria he said the damage to the relationship with the Syrian Democratic Forces has been repaired — because Donald Trump "ultimately agreed to keep a military presence in Syria, but we did lose significant leverage" amid the Turkish incursion into Syria, Roebuck said. "If you view our presence in northeast Syria as a source of leverage for some sort of future political solution [in the ongoing civil war in Syria], we pretty much overnight lost half of the territory that we were controlling, along with the SDF."
