= Jassim Mohammed Buallay =

Bahraini diplomat

Kassim Mohammed Buallay

Bahraini Ambassador to France of Bahrain to France
- In office 1952–1953
- Succeeded by: Salman Abdul Wahab al Sabagh

Bahraini Ambassador to Tunesia of Bahrain to Tunisia
- In office 1987 – September 1, 1994
- Succeeded by: Khalil Ebrahim Butarada

Bahraini Permanent Representative to the United Nations of Bahrain to United Nations
- In office September 1, 1994 – July 12, 2001
- Succeeded by: 21 May 2003: Tawfeeq Ahmed Almansoor; 2006–2007: Haya Rashed Al-Khalifa; 14 September 2011: Jamal Fares Alrowaiei

Personal details
- Born: March 15, 1942 (age 84) Muharraq
- Spouse: In 1969 he married Satia Buallay
- Children: 2 daughters, 2 sons
- Education: Manama Secondary School, American University of Beirut, graduate of Long Island University’s Brooklyn Campus, delivered a series of compelling lectures addressing current political, economic and strategic developments in the Middle East and the role of the United Nations.

Jassim Mohammed Buallay (born March 15, 1942) is a retired Bahraini Ambassador.

== Career ==
- From 1963 to 1969 he was Supervisor of Bursary Section of the Ministry of Education.
- From 1970 to 1974 he was international civil servant at the UNESCO in Paris,
- From 1974 to 1979 he was ambassador in Paris.
- From 1979 to 1987 he was Director of Economic Affairs in the Ministry of Foreign Affairs (Bahrain).
- From 1987 to September 1, 1994 he was Ambassador in Tunis (Tunisia).
- From September 1, 1994 to July 12, 2001 he was Permanent Representative next the Headquarters of the United Nations.
- In December 1998 he was President of the United Nations Security Council.
