= Houda Nonoo =

Bahraini diplomat (born 1964)

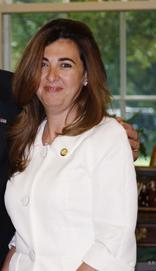
- Nonoo as Bahraini ambassador to the United States

Bahraini ambassador to the United States
- In office 3 July 2008 – 15 November 2013
- Succeeded by: Abdullah bin Mohammad bin Rashed Al Khalifa

Majlis al-shura
- In office 2005 – 3 July 2008
- Succeeded by: Nancy Khedouri

Personal details
- Born: 7 September 1964 (age 62)
- Spouse: Salman Idafar
- Children: Menasheh Idafar, Ezra Idafar
- Relatives: Misha Nonoo (cousin)

Houda Ezra Ebrahim Nonoo (Arabic: هدى عزرا نونو; born 7 September 1964) is a Bahraini politician who served as the Bahraini Ambassador to the United States from 2008 to 2013. She was appointed to the position by Foreign Affairs Minister Khalid bin Ahmed Al Khalifa. Nonoo is the first Jew, and the third woman, to be appointed ambassador of Bahrain. She is also the first Jewish ambassador of any Middle Eastern Arab country, and the first female Bahraini ambassador to the United States.

== Biography ==
Nonoo was born in Manama, to a family of Jewish business entrepreneurs with origins in present-day Iraq. Nonoo's grandfather Ibrahim left Baghdad in 1888 and started a financial business in Bahrain.

Nonoo lived for an extended period of time in the United Kingdom, where she attended Carmel College, a Jewish boarding school, and earned an MBA. She also met and married Salman Idafar, a British Jew, with whom she had two sons; Menasheh and Ezra. After her father died in a car accident, she returned to Bahrain to take over the Basma Company, a company offering different office services, from IT to janitorial services, hence becoming a successful businesswoman after inheriting the family's business.

Prior to her appointment to the Majlis al-shura in 2005, she founded in 2004 and presided over the Bahrain Human Rights Watch Society, a society for the advancement of women's rights as well as of foreign workers in Bahrain. For a total of three years served as a member of parliament (40-member Shura Council), after being appointed by King Hamad ibn Isa Al Khalifah. Her appointment made headlines because Houda is part of the small Jewish community of Bahrain. Bahrain's Jewish community reportedly consists of just 37 people, most of whom are the descendants of immigrants from Iraq and Iran. Nonoo is not the first person in her family to enter Bahraini politics, or member of the Jewish community. In 1934, her grandfather Abraham Nonoo served as a member of the Manama Municipality, the first ever elected municipal body in Bahrain. In 2000, a cousin, Ebrahim Daoud Nonoo was appointed to parliament. The Nonoo family is originally from Iraq, having moved to Bahrain over a century ago.

== Appointment as ambassador to the United States ==
On 3 July 2008, Nonoo was appointed Ambassador of the Kingdom of Bahrain to the United States, a role that also included responsibility over Bahraini diplomatic representation to Canada, Mexico, Brazil and Argentina (non-resident). Some local media criticized the appointment, and Radio Canada reported that her nomination was controversial within Bahrain, with some suggesting that a Jew might not be the best choice to defend Bahrain's refusal to recognise Israel. King Al-Khalifa rejected these concerns.

During her term as ambassador, she made quite a few changes at the embassy, like changing the iftar from all-male gatherings to mixed-gender events with lectures on Islam and also introduced and interfaith reunions with local imams, rabbis and Christian clergy as guests.

Her role ended in November 2013, when she was replaced by Abdullah bin Mohammad bin Rashed Al Khalifa, until then the military attaché of Bahrain in Washington.
