= Molly Williamson =

American diplomat

U.S. Consul General in Jerusalem
- In office 1991–1993
- President: George H. W. Bush
- Preceded by: Philip Wilcox Jr.
- Succeeded by: Edward Abington Jr.

Molly Williamson is a US diplomat who served as United States Consul General in Jerusalem from 1991 to 1993.
