= Janet Sorg Stoltzfus =

American educator (1931–2004)

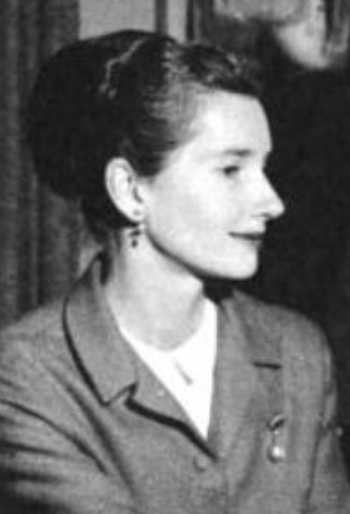
- Janet Sorg Stoltzfus, from a 1962 publication of the US State Department
- Born: Janet Lucille Sorg; May 24, 1931; East Orange, New Jersey, U.S.
- Died: March 5, 2004 (aged 72); Princeton, New Jersey, U.S.
- Occupation: Educator
- Spouse: William A. Stoltzfus Jr.

Janet Lucille Sorg Stoltzfus (May 24, 1931 – March 5, 2004) was an American educator. As a teacher married to an American diplomat, she established the Ta'iz Cooperative School, the first foreign school in North Yemen. The elementary-level classes included local Yemeni children and the children of embassy families.

== Early life ==
Janet Sorg was born in East Orange, New Jersey, the daughter of Harrison Theodore Sorg and Mildred Hoops Sorg (later Blasius). Her father was an insurance company executive. She attended the Kent Place School in Summit, New Jersey, and earned a bachelor's degree in English from Wellesley College in 1952. She was a member of Phi Beta Kappa. She earned a Bachelor of Letters degree at Trinity College Dublin in 1953.

== Career ==
Sorg was teaching English at the Beirut College for Women when she met her husband, American diplomat William A. Stoltzfus Jr. She accompanied her husband to postings in Ethiopia, Kuwait, Egypt, Libya, United Arab Emirates, Oman, Qatar, Bahrain, Saudi Arabia, Syria, and Yemen. "A typical Foreign Service couple of middle rank are crew-cut William Stoltzfus Jr. and his delicately pretty wife Janet," wrote columnist Jack Anderson in 1962.

With her husband leading the U.S. legation based in Taiz that formed the center of United States–Yemen relations at the time, the Stoltzfuses were in North Yemen from 1959 to 1961. There, she was the sole teacher at the Ta'iz Cooperative School, a one-room co-educational elementary program she founded in her home. The school originally intended to educate the young children of embassy families, but soon including Yemeni children as well, with permission from the ruler, imam Ahmad bin Yahya. It was the first foreign and non-religious school in north Yemen. A British woman, Joan Bailey, wife of the British diplomat Ronald Bailey, helped at the Taiz school, by teaching sewing and knitting classes. In 1997, Ambassador Stoltzfus gave an oral history interview and emphasized his opinion that "our most valuable contribution while we were in Yemen was my wife's school."

During her husband's other postings, Stoltzfus was head teacher at the English School in Kuwait and the American School in Damascus. She worked with an enrichment program for preschoolers in Ethiopia, and coordinated volunteers for a children's program under the auspices of the Kuwait Handicapped Society. She also founded a newsletter for senior citizens in London in the 1980s, titled The Ellesmere Gazette.

After they left the United States Foreign Service in 1976, the Stoltzfus home in Princeton, New Jersey, featured "crosses from Ethiopia, copperware from Iran, royal Arabic seals from Bahrein, a brass chest and a tall exquisite coffee pot from Saudi Arabia, and a massive hand-carved door from Kuwait", all souvenirs of their overseas service. Janet Stoltzfus taught English and religion at Princeton Day School. One of her students at Princeton Day School was Erik Menendez, and she was one of the former teachers called as a witness at his murder trial.

== Personal life ==
Janet Sorg married William A. Stoltzfus Jr. in 1954. They had five children, William III, Philip, Winifred, Susan, and Rebecca, all raised in part as embassy children. "We subsisted on cans of baked beans from the U.S. military base in Ethiopia," Stoltzfus recalled, "We had a lot of liquor, though." She died from cancer in 2004, at the age of 72, in Princeton, New Jersey.
