= Wat T. Cluverius IV =

American diplomat (1934–2010)

U.S. Consul General in Jerusalem
- In office 1983–1985
- President: Ronald Reagan
- Preceded by: Brandon Grove
- Succeeded by: Morris Draper

United States Ambassador to Bahrain
- In office 1976–1978
- President: Gerald Ford, Jimmy Carter
- Preceded by: Joseph W. Twinam
- Succeeded by: Robert H. Pelletreau, Jr.

Personal details
- Born: December 4, 1934 Arlington, Massachusetts, US
- Died: February 14, 2010 (aged 75) Shaker Heights, Ohio, US
- Spouse: Leah Konstabler

Wat Tyler Cluverius IV (December 4, 1934 – February 14, 2010) was an American diplomat with a focus on the Middle East.

Cluverius was born in Arlington, Massachusetts, and grew up in Chicago, Illinois. Cluverius married the former Leah Konstabler. Cluverius was a veteran of the United States Navy, serving from 1957 to 1962. He received a master's degree from Indiana University Bloomington in 1967. He was a fourth-generation member of the navy, and his daughter, Charlotte Cluverius, is a naval officer.

Cluverius joined the United States Department of State in the 1967. He served as U.S. Ambassador to Bahrain from 1976 to 1978. He also served as a deputy assistant secretary of state during the presidency of Ronald Reagan. According to then U.S. Secretary of State George Shultz, Cluverius was "a man to whom King Hussein talked easily and whom we therefore sent to Jordan at critical times." He also served as Consul General in Jerusalem from 1983 to 1985. From 1988 to 1998, he served as Director-General of the Multinational Force and Observers. From 2002 to 2007, he was the president and chief executive officer of the Cleveland Council on World Affairs. Cluverius was married to his wife, Leah. He had a son, Wat T. Cluverius V, daughter Charlotte, and two stepsons. After his death in 2010 at age 75, he was buried in Arlington National Cemetery.

Diplomatic posts
Preceded by Joseph W. Twinam	United States Ambassador to Bahrain; 1976–1978	Succeeded by Robert H. Pelletreau, Jr
