= Philip C. Wilcox Jr. =

American diplomat

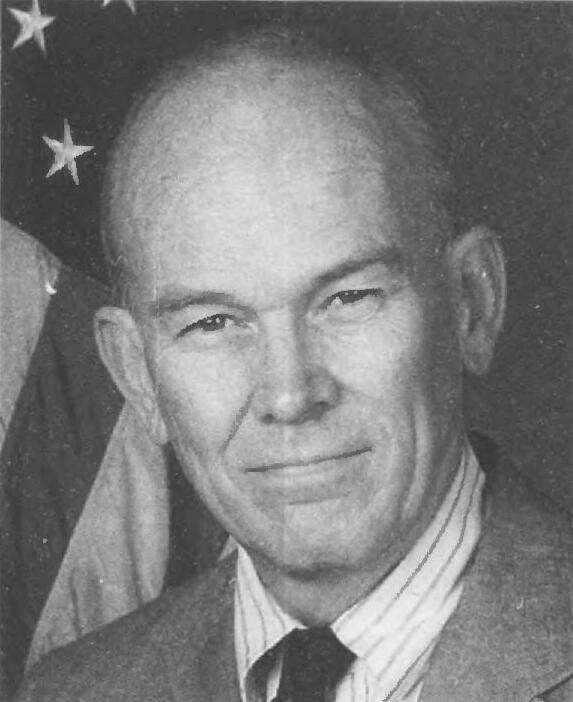
- Wilcox c. 1994

U.S. Consul General in Jerusalem
- In office 1989–1991
- President: George H. W. Bush
- Preceded by: Morris Draper
- Succeeded by: Molly Williamson

9th Coordinator for Counterterrorism
- In office March 24, 1995 – June 27, 1997
- Preceded by: Peter Burleigh
- Succeeded by: Christopher W.S. Ross

Personal details
- Born: February 1, 1937 (age 89) Denver, Colorado

Philip C. Wilcox Jr. (born February 1, 1937, Denver, Colorado) is a retired diplomat who served as the Coordinator for Counterterrorism. He was president of the Foundation for Middle East Peace until 2014.

Wilcox graduated from Williams College with a B.A. in History in 1958 and an LL.B. from the Stanford Law School in 1961. He went on to teach in Sierra Leone before practicing law for three years in Denver with the firm of Holme, Roberts & Owen.

He entered the Foreign Service in 1966 and retired in 1997. His last overseas assignment was as Chief of Mission and U.S. Consul General in Jerusalem. Wilcox received the State Department's Meritorious, Superior, and Presidential Honor Awards and came out of retirement to serve on an accountability review board that investigated the terrorist bombing of the U.S. embassy in Nairobi, Kenya on August 7, 1998.
