= Steven C. Bondy =

American diplomat

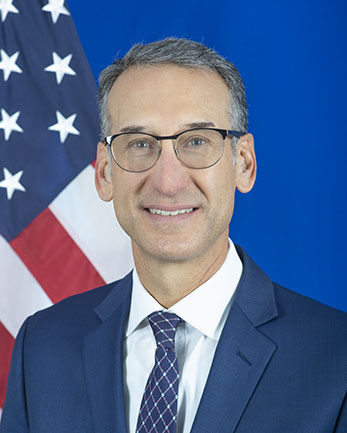

United States Ambassador to Bahrain
- In office February 9, 2022 – September 14, 2025
- President: Joe Biden; Donald Trump
- Preceded by: Justin Siberell
- Succeeded by: Stephanie Hallett

Personal details
- Education: University of Delaware (BA, MA)

Steven Craig Bondy is an American diplomat who had served as the United States Ambassador to Bahrain.

== Education ==
Raised in Livingston, New Jersey, Bondy was a 1980 graduate of Livingston High School. He earned his Bachelor of Arts and Master of Arts degrees from the University of Delaware.

== Career ==
Bondy is a career member of the Senior Foreign Service, class of Minister-Counselor. From 2017 to 2020 he was Chargé d'affaires and Deputy Chief of Mission at the U.S. Embassy in Abu Dhabi, United Arab Emirates. He previously served as the Assistant Chief of Mission in Kabul, Afghanistan and as the foreign policy advisor to the commander of the Joint Special Operations Command. He is the recipient of numerous U.S. government awards, including a Presidential Rank Award.

=== Ambassador to Bahrain ===
On April 15, 2021, President Joe Biden nominated Bondy to be the next United States Ambassador to Bahrain. On October 5, 2021, a hearing on his nomination was held before the Senate Foreign Relations Committee. On October 19, 2021, his nomination was reported favorably out of committee. The United States Senate confirmed him on December 18, 2021 by voice vote, making him the second Jewish ambassador to Bahrain after J. Adam Ereli. Bondy presented his credentials to King Hamad bin Isa Al Khalifa on February 9, 2022.

== Awards and recognitions ==
Bondy is the recipient of numerous U.S. government awards, including a Presidential Rank Award.

== Personal life ==
Bondy is Jewish and speaks Arabic, French, Persian, Turkish, and Spanish.

== See also ==
- List of ambassadors of the United States
