= Robert Pelletreau =

American diplomat (born 1935)

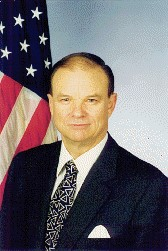

17th Assistant Secretary of State for Near Eastern Affairs
- In office February 18, 1994–January 24, 1997
- President: Bill Clinton
- Preceded by: Edward Djerejian
- Succeeded by: Martin Indyk

United States Ambassador to Egypt
- In office September 12, 1991–December 11, 1993
- President: George Herbert Walker Bush
- Preceded by: Frank G. Wisner
- Succeeded by: Edward S. Walker, Jr.

United States Ambassador to Tunisia
- In office July 1, 1987–May 11, 1991
- President: Ronald Reagan; George H. W. Bush
- Preceded by: Peter Sebastian
- Succeeded by: John Thomas McCarthy

United States Ambassador to Bahrain
- In office March 10, 1979–April 3, 1980
- President: Jimmy Carter
- Preceded by: Wat T. Cluverius IV
- Succeeded by: Peter A. Sutherland

Personal details
- Born: July 9, 1935 (age 91) Patchogue, New York, U.S.
- Spouse: Pamela Day Pelletreau
- Children: 3
- Education: Yale University (BA); Harvard University (LLB)

Robert Halsey Pelletreau Jr. (born July 9, 1935) is an American former diplomat who was United States Ambassador to Bahrain (1979–1980), Tunisia (1987–1991), and Egypt (1991–1993), as well as the former Assistant Secretary of State for Near Eastern Affairs. He currently sits on the U.S. Advisory Council of the Israel Policy Forum. He is also a member of the American Academy of Diplomacy and Council on Foreign Relations.

== Early years ==
Robert H. Pelletreau was born July 9, 1935, in Patchogue, New York. After graduating from Yale University (B.A., 1957), he served in the United States Navy Reserve from 1957 to 1958. Later he attended Harvard Law School (LL.B., 1961).

== Career ==
Ambassador Robert H. Pelletreau entered the Foreign Service in 1962. From 1973 to 1975 Ambassador Pelletreau was a Political Officer in Algiers, Algeria; and served in several capacities in Jordan, Lebanon, Mauritania and Morocco. He became Deputy Chief of Mission in Damascus, Syria in 1975. He remained in that position until 1978. A year later he became the Ambassador to the State of Bahrain until 1980. He became the Deputy Assistant Secretary of Defense for Near East and South Asia at the Pentagon, 1980–1981. He was Country Director for Arabian Peninsula Affairs at the Department of State, 1981–1982, and from 1983–1985 the Deputy Assistant Secretary of State for Near Eastern and South Asian Affairs at the Department of State. He appeared before the Subcommittee on Europe and the Middle East of the House Foreign Affairs Committee on September 26, 1983, addressing Major U.S. Interests in the Middle East. He was Deputy Assistant Secretary of Defense from 1985–1987. Afterwards, he was Ambassador to the Republic of Tunisia from 1987 to 1991. Prior to his most recent position, Ambassador Pelletreau had served as Ambassador Extraordinary and Plenipotentiary to the Arab Republic of Egypt on July 31, 1991. Mr. Pelletreau, Jr. was sworn in as Assistant Secretary for Near Eastern Affairs on February 18, 1994.

== Family ==
Pelletreau is married and has three children.

Diplomatic posts
Preceded by Wat T. Cluverius IV	United States Ambassador to Bahrain; 1979–1980	Succeeded by Peter Adams Sutherland
Preceded by Peter Sebastian	United States Ambassador to Tunisia; 1987–1991	Succeeded by John Thomas McCarthy
Preceded by Frank G. Wisner	United States Ambassador to Egypt; 1991–1993	Succeeded by Edward S. Walker, Jr.
