= Charles Warren Hostler =

American diplomat (1919–2014)

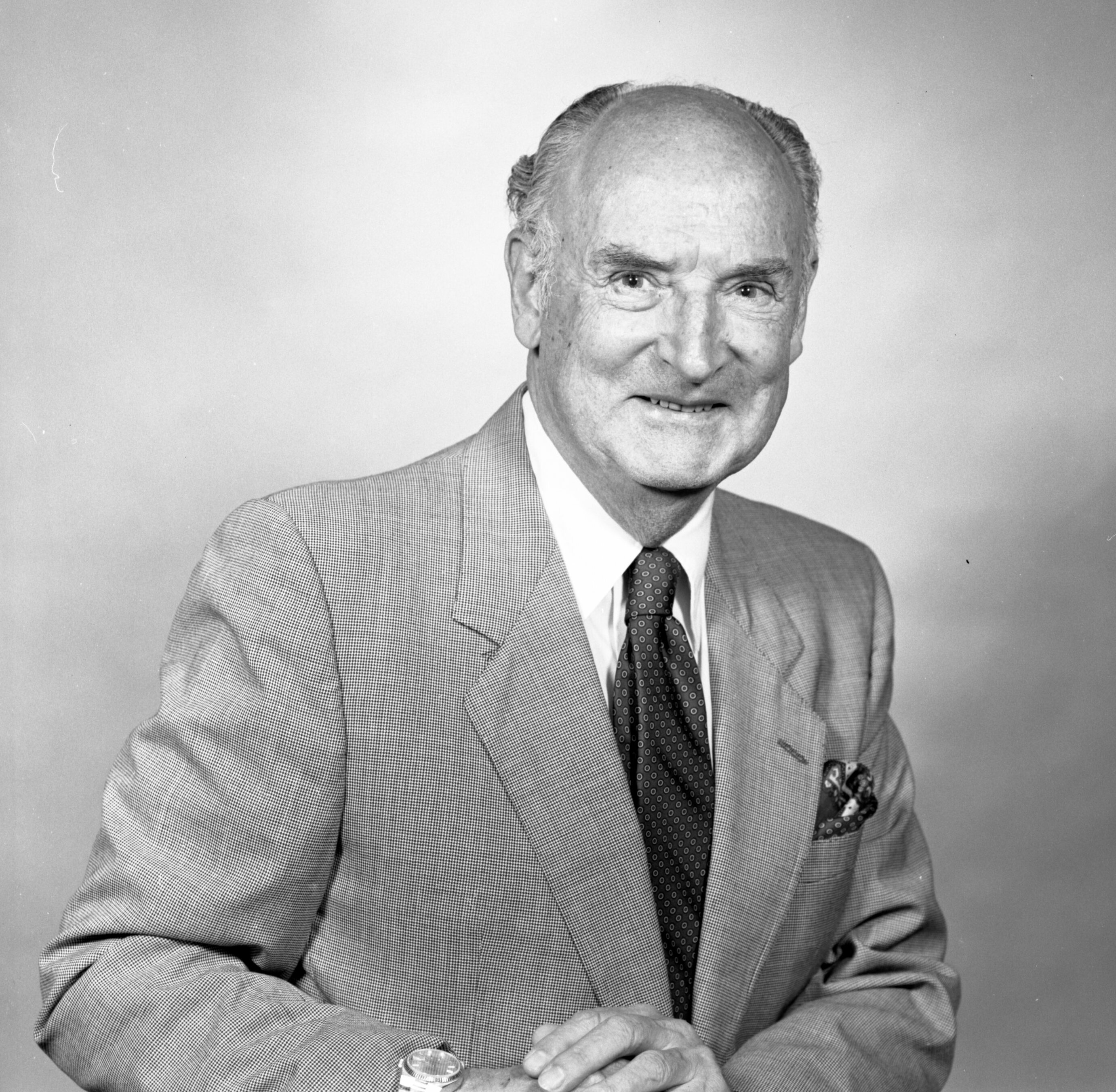

United States Ambassador to Bahrain
- In office 1989–1993

Personal details
- Awards: (United States) Legion of Merit (France) Legion of Honour

Military service
- Allegiance: United States
- Branch/service: United States Air Force
- Rank: Lieutenant

Charles Warren Hostler (December 12, 1919 – September 28, 2014) was an American diplomat. He served as the U.S. Ambassador to Bahrain from 1989 to 1993, as a political appointee. He also served as a colonel in the United States Air Force, an executive with McDonnell Douglas and adjunct professor of political science at San Diego State University.

== Life and career ==
Hostler earned a Legion of Merit award from the U.S. and a French Legion of Honor as a result of his service in World War II as a military intelligence officer. He credits his tenure at the Office of Strategic Services (OSS, the forerunner to the Central Intelligence Agency) with teaching him "how to survive and helped me excel".

Hostler joined the Reserve Officers' Training Corps (ROTC) to help pay for college at UCLA. He went on active duty when he graduated in 1942. He worked for the OSS, in part because he was fluent in French. He was assigned to work with the French resistance and root out collaborators. He landed at Utah Beach on D-Day. When Paris was liberated, he went to Romania to smuggle out pro-democracy leaders. In the early days of the Cold War, he "helped train the air intelligence unit of the Turkish military and also served as U.S. military attache in Lebanon, Jordan and Cyprus."

Stateside, he continued his education, earning a master's and doctorate in political science from Georgetown University and a master’s in Middle Eastern studies from the American University in Beirut. Hostler also served as a long-time public member appointee to San Diego County's Local Agency Formation Commission (LAFCO) and served as their Chair in overseeing the incorporation of Poway and Santee, which were subsequently approved by voters in 1980. A student center for sports, health, and wellbeing at the American University of Beirut was erected in his name in 2008. Hostler lived in Coronado, California with his wife when he died from cardiac arrest at a San Diego naval hospital on September 28, 2014, at the age of 94.
