= Embassy of Bahrain, Islamabad =

Embassy of Bahrain, Islamabad سفارة البحرين في إسلام آباد (Arabic)
- Location: Islamabad, Pakistan
- Address: House No. 12, Street 2, Sector F-6/3,
- Coordinates: 33.739811°N 73.080310°E
- Ambassador: Mohamed Ebrahim Mohamed Abdulqader
- Website: www.mofa.gov.bh/islamabad

The Embassy of Bahrain in Islamabad is the diplomatic mission of Bahrain to Pakistan. It is located at House No. 12, Street 2 in Sector F-6/3, Islamabad. Bahrain also has a consulate-general in Karachi.

The current embassy building was inaugurated in 2006 by Salman, Crown Prince of Bahrain. The embassy promotes bilateral relations between Bahrain and Pakistan, and provides consular services for Bahraini citizens in the country.

Mohamed Ebrahim Mohamed Abdulqader is the Bahraini ambassador to Pakistan.
