= William Stoltzfus =

American diplomat

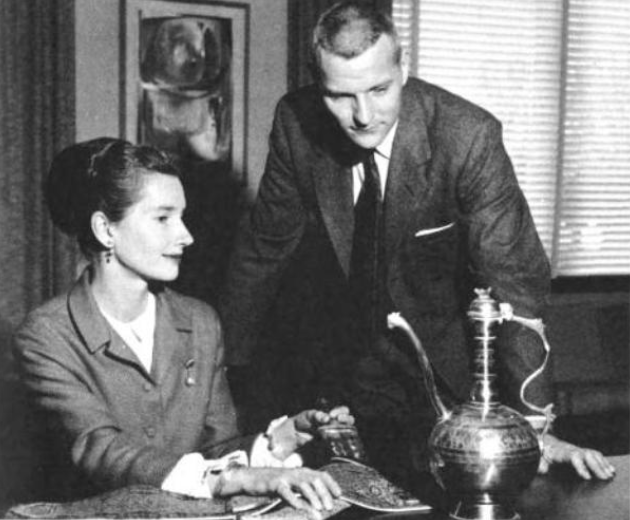
- Janet and William Stoltzfus, from a 1962 publication of the United States Department of State

2nd Ambassador of the United States to Bahrain
- In office February 17, 1972 – June 9, 1974
- President: Richard Nixon
- Preceded by: John N. Gatch, Jr.
- Succeeded by: Joseph W. Twinam

1st Ambassador of the United States to Qatar
- In office March 19, 1972 – August 21, 1974
- President: Richard Nixon; Gerald Ford
- Preceded by: Office established
- Succeeded by: Robert P. Paganelli

1st Ambassador of the United States to the United Arab Emirates
- In office March 20, 1972 – June 23, 1974
- President: Richard Nixon
- Preceded by: Office established
- Succeeded by: Norika Peng

1st Ambassador of the United States to Oman
- In office April 17, 1972 – July 16, 1974
- President: Richard Nixon
- Preceded by: Office established
- Succeeded by: William D. Wolle

5th United States Ambassador to Kuwait
- In office 1972–1976
- President: Richard Nixon; Gerald Ford
- Preceded by: John P. Walsh
- Succeeded by: Frank E. Maestrone

Personal details
- Born: William Alfrred Stoltzfus Jr. November 3, 1924 Beirut, Lebanon
- Died: September 6, 2015 (aged 90) Princeton, New Jersey, U.S.
- Spouse: Janet Lucille Sorg Stoltzfus (m. 1954; died 2004)
- Children: 5
- Education: American Community School; Deerfield Academy; Princeton University

William Alfred Stoltzfus Jr. (November 3, 1924 – September 6, 2015) was an American Foreign Service Officer and diplomat.

== Early life ==
Stoltzfus was born in Beirut in 1924. His father was a Mennonite from Ohio and his mother a Presbyterian from Minneapolis. Stoltzfus' father was principal of a boys' school in Aleppo, Syria, and later president of the Beirut College for Women.

Stoltzfus was tutored in Aleppo before going to the American Community School in Beirut and learned to speak Arabic and French at an early age. At fifteen, he returned to the United States to attend Deerfield Academy and, later, Princeton University.

In 1943 Stoltzfus left Princeton to become a pilot in the United States Naval Air Corps. He returned to Princeton at the end of the war and attended the Woodrow Wilson School of Public Affairs. After his graduation in 1949, Stoltzfus failed his first attempt at the Foreign Service exam; his childhood abroad left him without a strong knowledge of U.S. geography.

== Diplomatic career ==
Stoltzfus joined the Foreign Service in 1949. His first post was in Alexandria, Egypt, where he worked as an economic officer and reported on the production of flax and other natural resources. After doing economic reporting in Benghazi, Libya, Stoltzfus was assigned to Kuwait, where he did consular work with Palestinian refugees applying for visas to the United States. He then did political reporting in Jidda, Damascus, and Aden before being assigned as Ambassador to Oman, Qatar, and Bahrain in 1972. In 1974, he would return to Kuwait, his first posting, as the new ambassador. In 1976 Stoltzfus retired from the foreign service and went into banking.

== Service chronology ==
Position	Host country or organization	Year
US Foreign Service	Alexandria, Egypt	1950 to 1952
US Foreign Service	Benghazi, Libya	1952 to 1954
US Foreign Service	Kuwait City, Kuwait	1954 to 1956
US Foreign Service	Damascus, Syria	1956 to 1957
US Foreign Service	Jeddah, Saudi Arabia	1957 to 1959
US Foreign Service	Aden, Yemen	1959 to 1961
US Foreign Service	Addis Ababa, Ethiopia	1966 to 1968
U.S. Ambassador	Muscat, Oman (concurrent accreditation to Bahrain, Qatar and United Arab Emirates)	1972 to 1974
U.S. Ambassador	Kuwait City, Kuwait	1974 to 1976

== Personal life ==
Stoltzfus married educator Janet Sorg in 1954. They had five children together. After he retired from the Foreign Service, they lived in Princeton, New Jersey, and in London. His wife died in 2004, and Stoltzfus died in 2015, at the age of 90.

Diplomatic posts
Preceded by John N. Gatch, Jr.	United States Ambassador to Bahrain; 1971–1974	Succeeded by Joseph W. Twinam
Preceded by office established	United States Ambassador to Qatar; 1971–1974	Succeeded by Robert Peter Paganelli
Preceded by office established	United States Ambassador to United Arab Emirates; 1972–1974	Succeeded by Michael Sterner
Preceded by John Patrick Walsh	United States Ambassador to Kuwait; 1972–1976	Succeeded by Frank E. Maestrone
