= Donald C. Leidel =

American lawyer (1927–2018)

Donald Charles Leidel (August 31, 1927 – April 19, 2018) was an American diplomat. A career Foreign Service Officer, he served as U.S. Ambassador Extraordinary and Plenipotentiary to Bahrain from 1983 until 1986.

Leidel practiced law there after he graduated from law school in 1951. He was recruited to join the Central Intelligence Agency (CIA) and spent eleven years with them which included three years with the Air Force, in which he became a first lieutenant. He went on to spend thirty years with the State Department, retiring in 1994.

== Early life ==
Leidel was born on August 31, 1927, and raised in Madison, Wisconsin. He graduated from Madison East High School, before attending University of Wisconsin, majoring in political science and minoring in history and graduated from their Law School.

== Career ==
A law school friend encouraged Don to interview for the CIA after seeing a flier in school. The friend insisted that the interview would be a good experience for Don when he went on to interview at law firms. They were both offered “employment as GS9 and $4,800/year in Washington, D.C. ... about $1,500 more than the top law graduates were being offered in law firms.“. But for Don, Washington, DC was the clincher, even though he decided to keep his Bar membership in case it did not work out.

== Personal life and death ==
Leidel died in Sarasota, Florida on April 19, 2018, at the age of 90.
