= List of diplomatic missions in Bahrain =

This is a list of diplomatic missions in Bahrain. The capital, Manama, hosts 41 embassies.

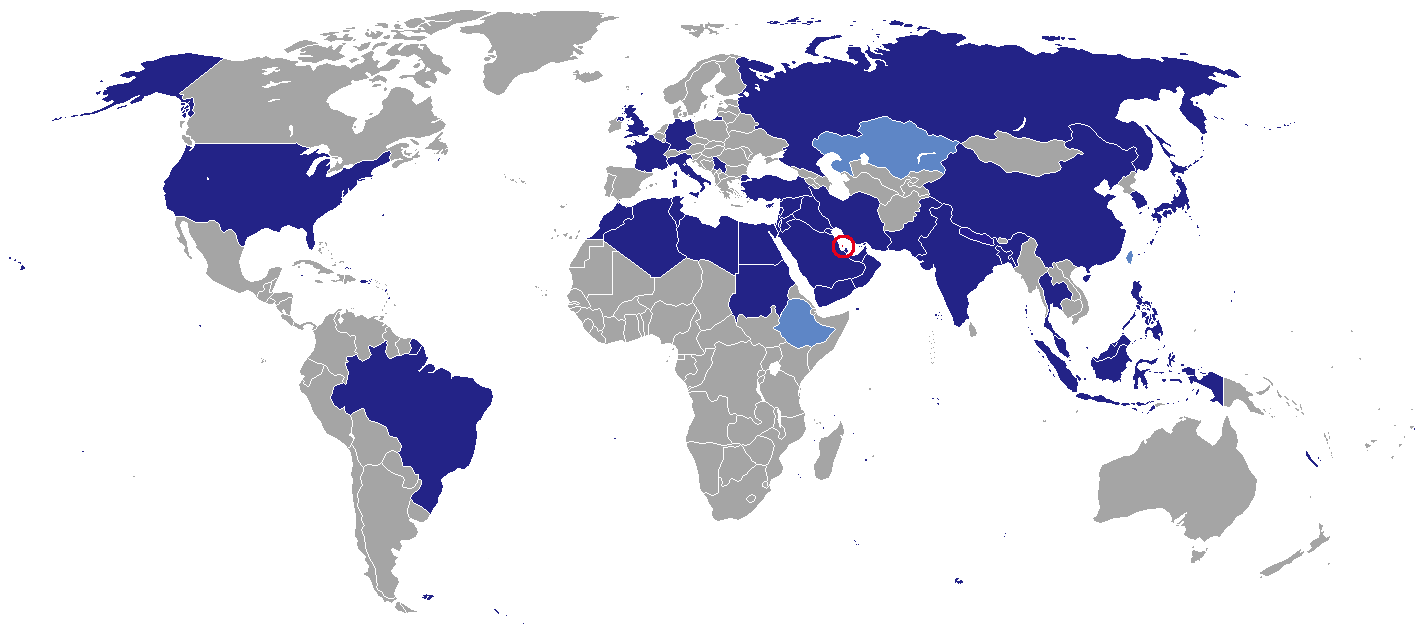
Map of diplomatic missions in Bahrain

== Embassies in Manama ==
1. Algeria
2. Bangladesh
3. Brazil
4. Brunei
5. China
6. Cyprus
7. Egypt
8. France
9. Germany
10. India
11. Indonesia
12. Iraq
13. Israel
14. Italy
15. Japan
16. Jordan
17. Kuwait
18. Lebanon
19. Libya
20. Malaysia
21. Morocco
22. Nepal
23. Oman
24. Pakistan
25. Palestine
26. Philippines
27. Qatar
28. Russia
29. Saudi Arabia
30. Serbia
31. South Korea
32. Sri Lanka
33. Sudan
34. Syria
35. Thailand
36. Tunisia
37. Turkey
38. United Arab Emirates
39. United Kingdom
40. United States
41. Yemen

== Consulate-General in Manama ==
- Ethiopia
- Kazakhstan

== Other missions in Manama ==
- Northern Cyprus (Representative Office)
- Republic of China (Taiwan) (Trade Office)

== Gallery ==
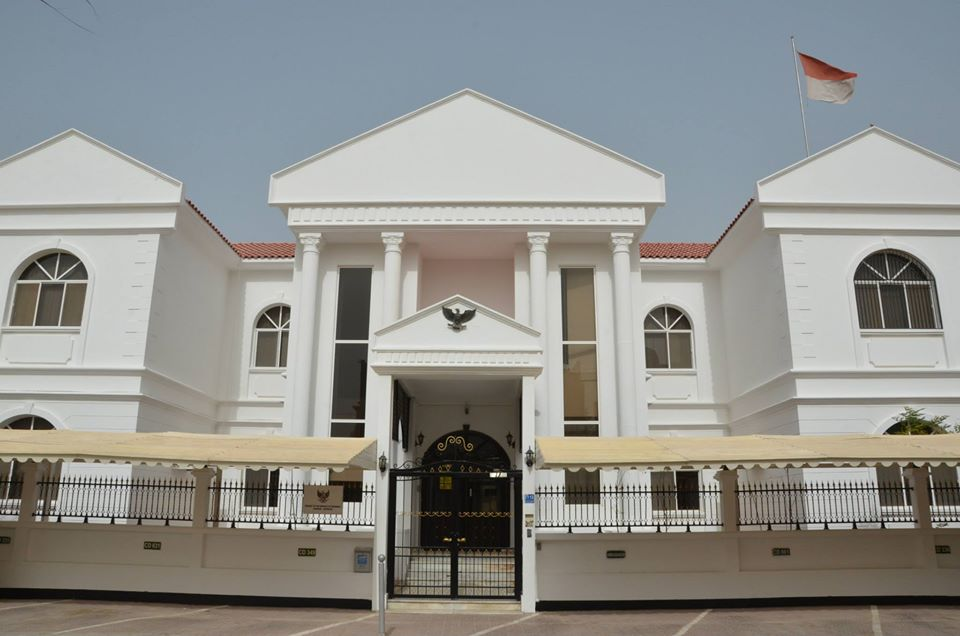
Embassy of Indonesia

Building hosting the Embassy of Israel and the Consulate-General of Ethiopia

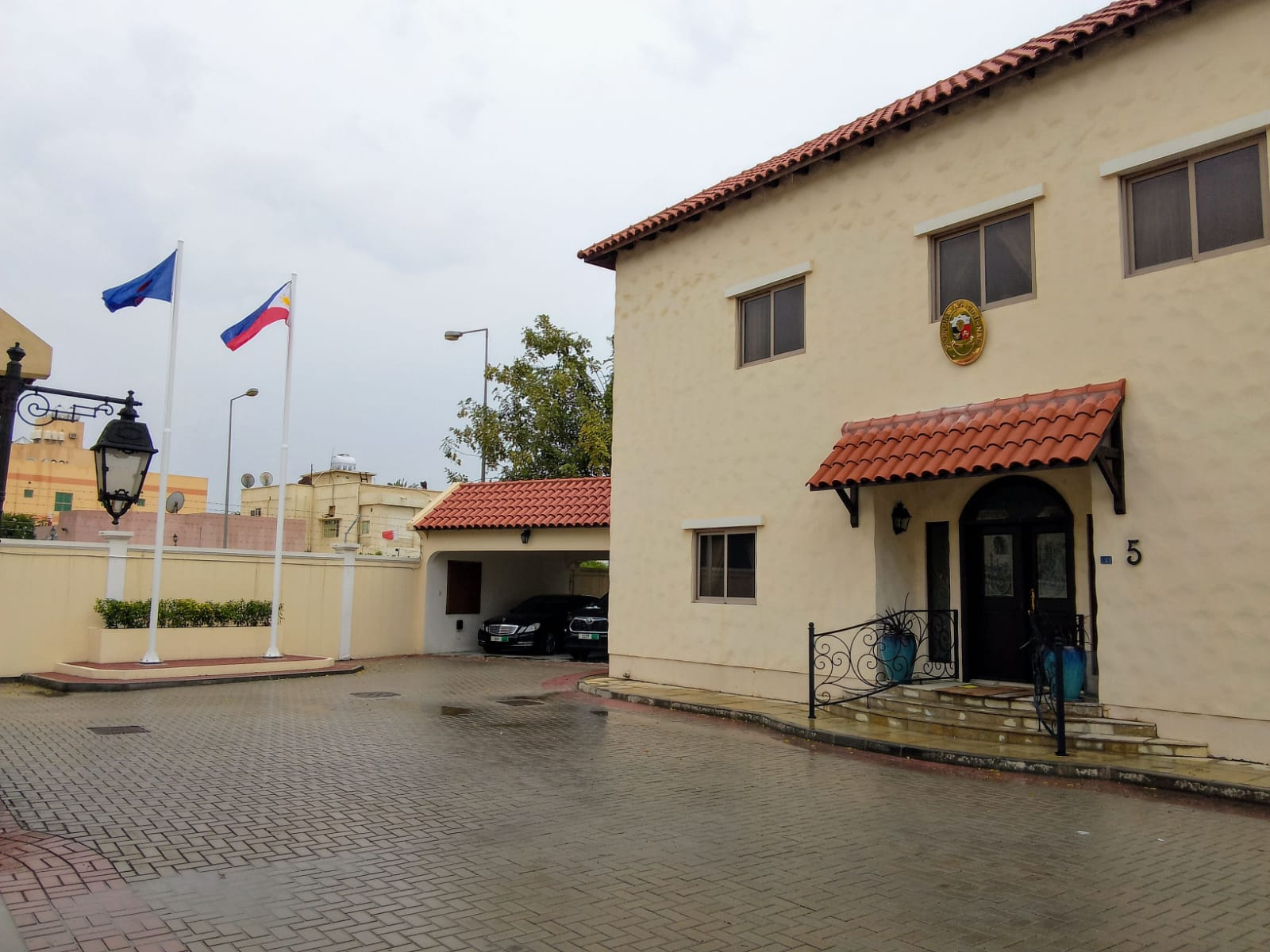
Embassy of the Philippines

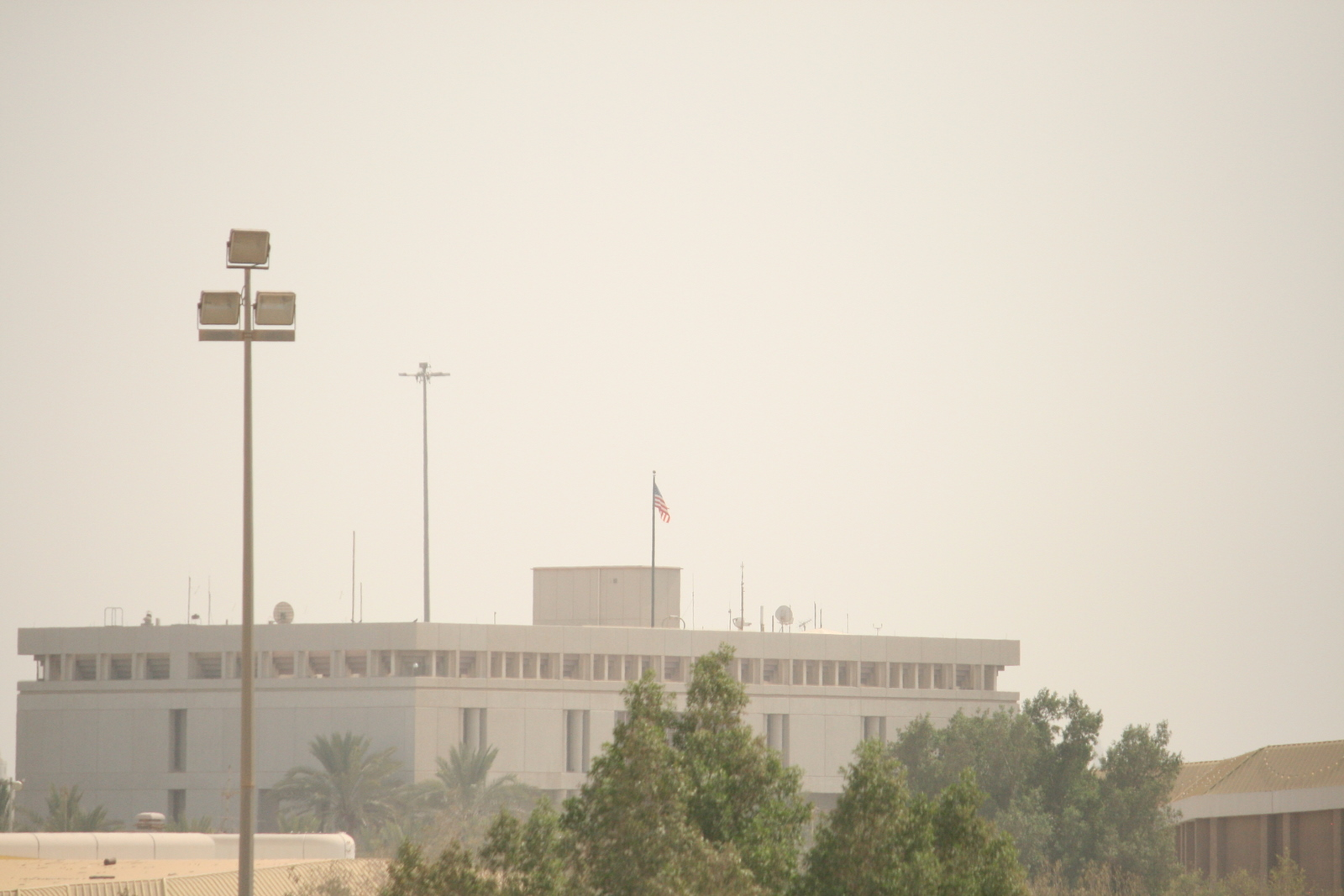
Embassy of United States

== Non-resident embassies ==
=== Resident in Abu Dhabi, United Arab Emirates ===
- Angola
- Australia
- Armenia
- Benin
- Chile
- Costa Rica
- Estonia
- Fiji
- Guatemala
- Guinea
- Latvia
- Lithuania
- Paraguay
- Rwanda
- Switzerland
- Seychelles
- Tanzania
- Tonga

=== Resident in Cairo, Egypt ===
- Bolivia
- Congo-Brazzaville
- Congo-Kinshasa
- Ecuador

=== Resident in Kuwait City, Kuwait ===
- Belgium
- Bhutan
- Bosnia and Herzegovina
- Botswana
- Bulgaria
- Cambodia
- Central African Republic
- Ethiopia
- Greece
- Honduras
- Kenya
- Malawi
- Mongolia
- Netherlands
- Nicaragua
- Niger
- Nigeria
- North Korea
- Poland
- Sierra Leone
- Slovakia
- Spain
- Togo
- Vietnam
- Zimbabwe

=== Resident in Riyadh, Saudi Arabia ===
- Albania
- Argentina
- Burkina Faso
- Burundi
- Canada
- Colombia
- Comoros
- Chad
- Cuba
- Czech Republic
- Djibouti
- Eritrea
- Gabon
- Gambia
- Georgia
- Ireland
- Ivory Coast
- Kosovo
- Kyrgyzstan
- Mali
- Maldives
- Madagascar
- Malta
- Mauritius
- Mexico
- New Zealand
- Peru
- Portugal
- Singapore
- Somalia
- South Africa
- Tajikistan
- Uganda
- Uzbekistan
- Zambia

=== Resident elsewhere ===
- Bahamas (Nassau)
- Cape Verde (Rome)
- Haiti (Rome)
- South Sudan (Doha)

== Former Embassies ==
- Iran (to be reopened)
- New Zealand (Note: Resident in Riyadh, Saudi Arabia)
- Senegal

== See also ==
- Visa requirements for Bahraini citizens
