= Stephanie Hallett =

American diplomat

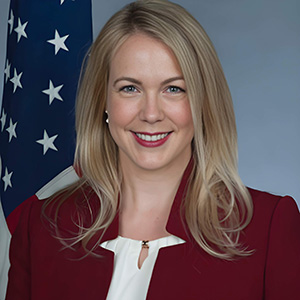
- Official portrait, 2026

United States Ambassador to Bahrain
- Incumbent
- Assumed office January 21, 2026
- President: Donald Trump
- Preceded by: Steven C. Bondy

Chargé d’Affaires ad interim to Israel
- In office January 20, 2025 – April 17, 2025
- President: Donald Trump
- Preceded by: Jack Lew
- Succeeded by: Mike Huckabee
- In office July 21, 2023 – November 5, 2023
- President: Joe Biden
- Preceded by: Tom Nides
- Succeeded by: Jack Lew

Personal details
- Education: George Washington University (BA); University of Cambridge (M.Phil)

Stephanie Hallett is an American diplomat who has served as U.S. Ambassador to Bahrain since January 2026. She is the first woman to hold the position. She was the Deputy Chief of Mission to U.S. Ambassador to Israel Jack Lew from 2023 to 2025.

Hallett has also twice previously served as the chargé d'affaires ad interim (or interim ambassador) of the United States to Israel at the U.S. embassy in Jerusalem from July to November 2023 and again from January to April 2025. On June 13, 2024, Joe Biden announced his intention to nominate Hallett to be ambassador to Bahrain. Hearings in the U.S. Senate were held, but a confirmation vote was held as a presidential transition started in November 2024, with Hallett’s nomination being returned. Donald Trump re-nominated her in September 2025, and after confirmation she took up the position in January 2026.

== Education ==
Hallett graduated with a BA from the George Washington University and an M.Phil. from the University of Cambridge. She speaks Arabic and Spanish.

== Diplomatic career ==
Hallett began her diplomatic career in the Office of Iranian Affairs and the State Department Operations Center in Washington, DC, as well as assignments at the U.S. consulates general in Monterrey, Mexico, and Jeddah, Saudi Arabia.

Her diplomatic career continued in assignments such as deputy chief of mission at the U.S. Embassy in Nicosia, Cyprus, and deputy chief of mission at the U.S. Embassy in Muscat, Oman. She also worked as deputy director of the Executive Secretariat Staff in Washington, DC, and held roles such as political and economic section chief at the U.S. Embassy in Manama, Bahrain, and deputy political counselor at the U.S. Embassy in Cairo, Egypt.

=== Chargé d’Affaires ad interim to Israel ===
On July 21, 2023, Hallett was appointed chargé d'affaires ad interim at the U.S. Embassy in Jerusalem. Prior to this role, she served as deputy chief of mission in Israel and also held the position of acting senior director for the Middle East and North Africa, as well as director of Gulf affairs at the National Security Council.

Hallett and Secretary of State Antony Blinken with members of the Israeli war cabinet in Tel Aviv, November 3, 2023

In her first tweet as embassy chief, she thanked former U.S. ambassador to Israel Thomas R. Nides for his "commitment to ensuring that the ties between the U.S. and Israel remained ironclad." She expressed support for U.S.-Israel relations, saying "I look forward to continuing the work of reinforcing the unshakable bond between the US and Israel as the U.S. Embassy in Israel’s chargé d’affaires." Nides told The Times of Israel that Hallett "is as good as it gets. A brilliant, experienced senior foreign service officer. I am leaving the embassy in great hands."

In September, the Biden administration expressed it would not confirm another ambassador to Israel before the 2024 U.S. presidential election because of the difficulties in getting such an appointment confirmed by the Senate in the current political climate in the U.S. and the time it would consume. This meant Hallett would continue her role as chargé d'affaires ad interim at the U.S. Embassy in Jerusalem until 2024. However, following the October 7 attacks, the U.S. Senate decided to approve the presumptive nominee, former U.S. Treasury Secretary Jack Lew, in a fast-tracked vote, meaning Hallett’s tenure ended and she returned as deputy chief.

Hallett with Chairman of the Joint Chiefs of Staff Charles Q. Brown Jr. and Israeli Defense Minister Yoav Gallant in Tel Aviv, December 18, 2023

Amid the October 7 attacks, Hallett said she was "sickened by the images coming out of southern Israel of dead and wounded civilians at the hands of terrorists from Gaza", and affirmed that the United States would stand with Israel.

According to Reuters, in February 2024 Hallett and Lew had blocked distribution of several cables written by USAID staffers which described the severity of humanitarian conditions in Gaza at the time in the midst of the ongoing war. One cable, received three months after the start of the war, included descriptions of human bones left on roads, dead bodies abandoned in cars, and "catastrophic human needs, particularly for food and safe drinking water". Hallett and Lew prevented further distribution of the reports within the government as they believed they "lacked balance". Three former U.S. officials told Reuters that "the descriptions were unusually graphic" and "would have commanded the attention" of senior officials if they had been distributed amongst those in the administration.

In response to Reuters' reporting, in January 2026, the Council on American-Islamic Relations (CAIR) condemned Lew and Hallett as "war criminals". CAIR's national deputy director Edward Ahmed Mitchell said "in any just international legal system, officials who knowingly conceal evidence of genocide to enable its continuation would be investigated as war criminals. Based on the facts as reported, Jack Lew and Stephanie Hallett did not merely fail in their duties, they allegedly used their power to suppress life-saving information, helping turn Gaza into a graveyard."

Hallett once again served as chargé d'affaires ad interim at the U.S. Embassy in Jerusalem from January 2025, after Jack Lew resigned in accordance with a new administration, to April when her successor, Mike Huckabee, was nominated by Donald Trump and approved by the U.S. Senate.

=== Ambassador to Bahrain ===
Hallett, Secretary of State Marco Rubio and Bahraini Minister of Foreign Affairs Abdullatif bin Rashid Al Zayani in Manama, Bahrain, June 24, 2025

On September 2, 2025, Donald Trump nominated Hallett for the position of Ambassador to Bahrain, a position for which she had previously been nominated by the Biden administration. She was confirmed by the Senate on October 7, 2025, and presented her credentials to King Hamad bin Isa Al Khalifa of Bahrain on January 20, 2026.
