= Joseph W. Twinam =

American diplomat (1934–2001)

United States Ambassador to Bahrain
- In office 1974–1976
- President: Richard Nixon, Gerald Ford
- Preceded by: William Stoltzfus
- Succeeded by: Wat Cluverius

Personal details
- Born: July 11, 1934 Chattanooga, Tennessee, U.S.
- Died: June 12, 2001 (aged 66) Charleston, South Carolina, U.S.
- Spouse: Janet Ashby

Joseph Wright Twinam (July 11, 1934 – June 12, 2001) was an American diplomat with a focus on the Middle East. Ambassador Twinam was the first U.S. ambassador accredited solely to Bahrain, serving from 1974 to 1976. He served as Deputy Assistant Secretary of State for Near Eastern & South Asian Affairs, from 1979 to 1982. He then served three years as dean of the Foreign Service Institute & as diplomat-in-residence at the University of Virginia, finally retiring from the State Department in 1985. He subsequently was a distinguished visiting professor at the Citadel for eight years, and an adjunct professor at Southern Methodist University from 1998 to 1999. He died in Charleston, South Carolina from injuries sustained in a fall. A member of Phi Beta Kappa, it was revealed on his death that Twinam was also a member of the Seven Society at Virginia.

== Writings ==
- Twinam, Joseph W. (1992). The Gulf, Cooperation, and the Council : an American Perspective. Washington, D.C.: Middle East Policy Council. ISBN 0943182077.

Diplomatic posts
Preceded by William Stoltzfus	United States Ambassador to Bahrain; 1974–1976	Succeeded by Wat Tyler Cluverius IV
