= List of diplomatic missions of Bahrain =

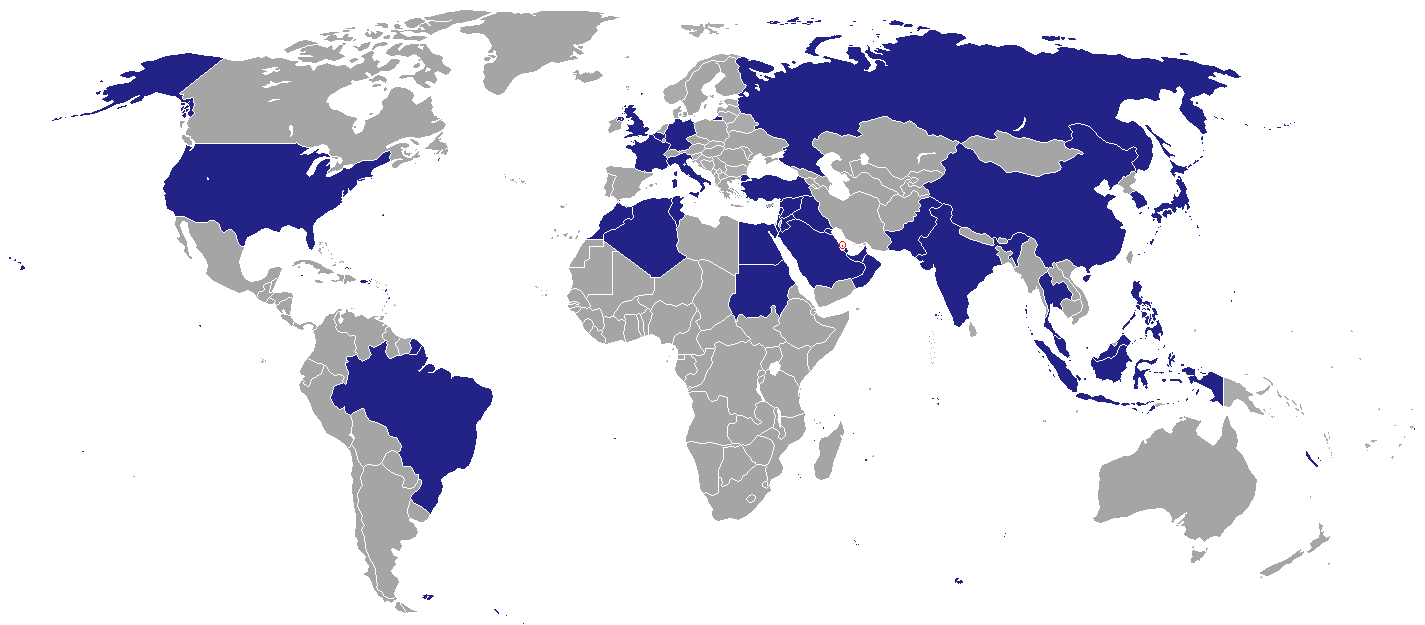
Diplomatic missions of Bahrain

This is a list of diplomatic missions of Bahrain, excluding honorary consulates. Bahrain's diplomatic network is rather limited, with the majority of overseas missions located in predominantly Muslim or Asian countries.

== Africa ==
- Algeria
  - Algiers (Embassy)
- Egypt
  - Cairo (Embassy)
- Morocco
  - Rabat (Embassy)
  - Laayoune (Consulate-General)
- Sudan
  - Khartoum (Embassy)
- Tunisia
  - Tunis (Embassy)

== Americas ==
- Brazil
  - Brasília (Embassy)
- United States
  - Washington D.C. (Embassy)

== Asia ==
- China
  - Beijing (Embassy)
- India
  - New Delhi (Embassy)
  - Mumbai (Consulate-General)
- Indonesia
  - Jakarta (Embassy)
- Iraq
  - Baghdad (Embassy)
  - Najaf (Consulate-General)
- Israel
  - Tel Aviv (Embassy)
- Japan
  - Tokyo (Embassy)
- Jordan
  - Amman (Embassy)
- Kuwait
  - Kuwait City (Embassy)
- Lebanon
  - Beirut (Embassy)
- Malaysia
  - Kuala Lumpur (Embassy)
- Oman
  - Muscat (Embassy)
- Pakistan
  - Islamabad (Embassy)
  - Karachi (Consulate-General)
- Philippines
  - Manila (Embassy)
- Qatar
  - Doha (Embassy)
- Saudi Arabia
  - Riyadh (Embassy)
  - Jeddah (Consulate-General)
- South Korea
  - Seoul (Embassy)
- Syria
  - Damascus (Embassy)
- Thailand
  - Bangkok (Embassy)
- Turkey
  - Ankara (Embassy)
- United Arab Emirates
  - Abu Dhabi (Embassy)
  - Dubai (Consulate-General)

== Europe ==
- Belgium
  - Brussels (Embassy)
- France
  - Paris (Embassy)
- Germany
  - Berlin (Embassy)
- Italy
  - Rome (Embassy)
- Russia
  - Moscow (Embassy)
- United Kingdom
  - London (Embassy)

== Multilateral organizations ==
- Arab League
  - Cairo (Permanent Mission)
- United Nations
  - New York City (Permanent Mission)
  - Geneva (Permanent Mission)

== Embassy to open ==
- Libya
  - Tripoli (Embassy)
- Serbia
  - Belgrade (Embassy)

== Gallery ==
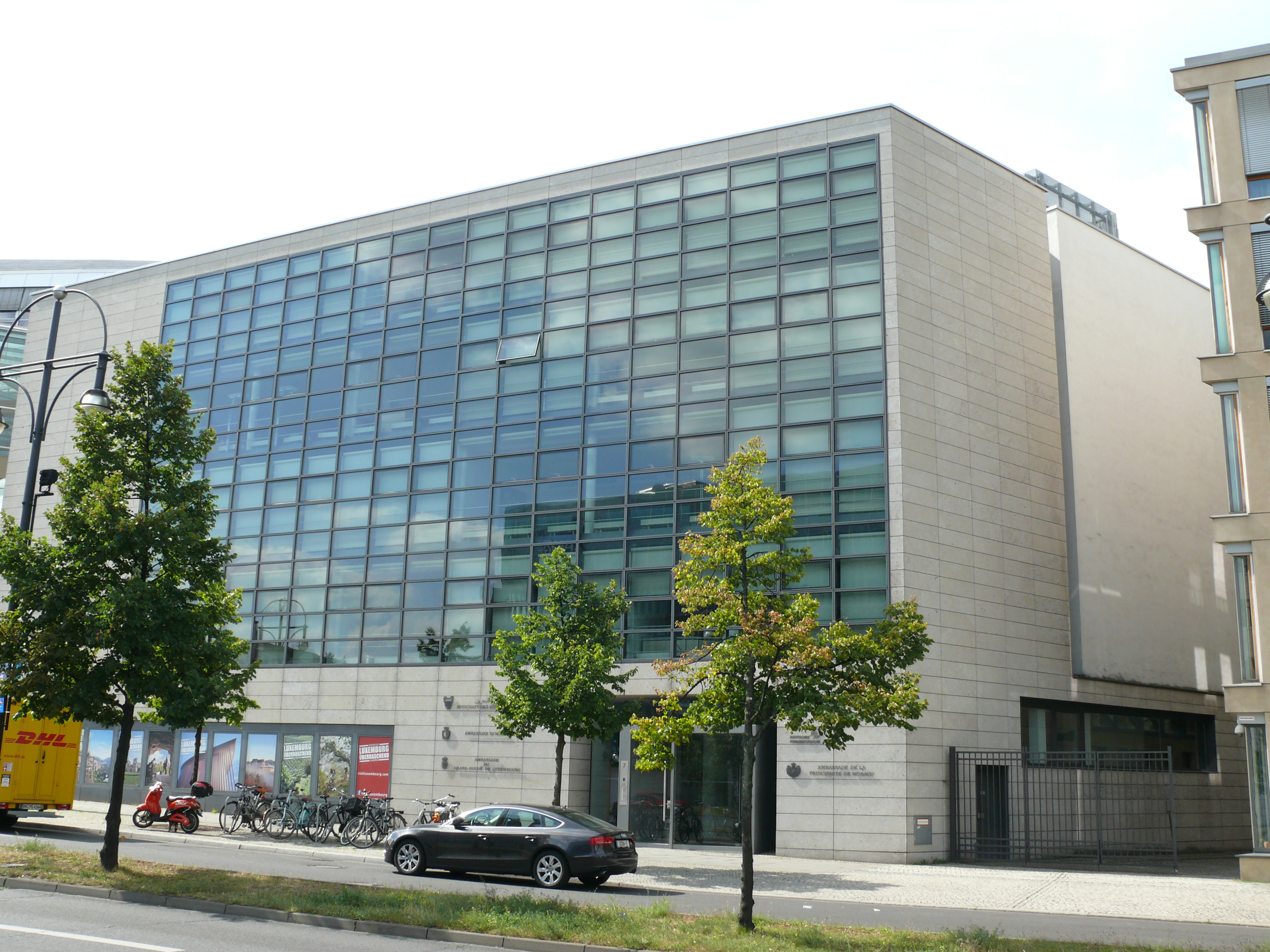
Embassy in Berlin

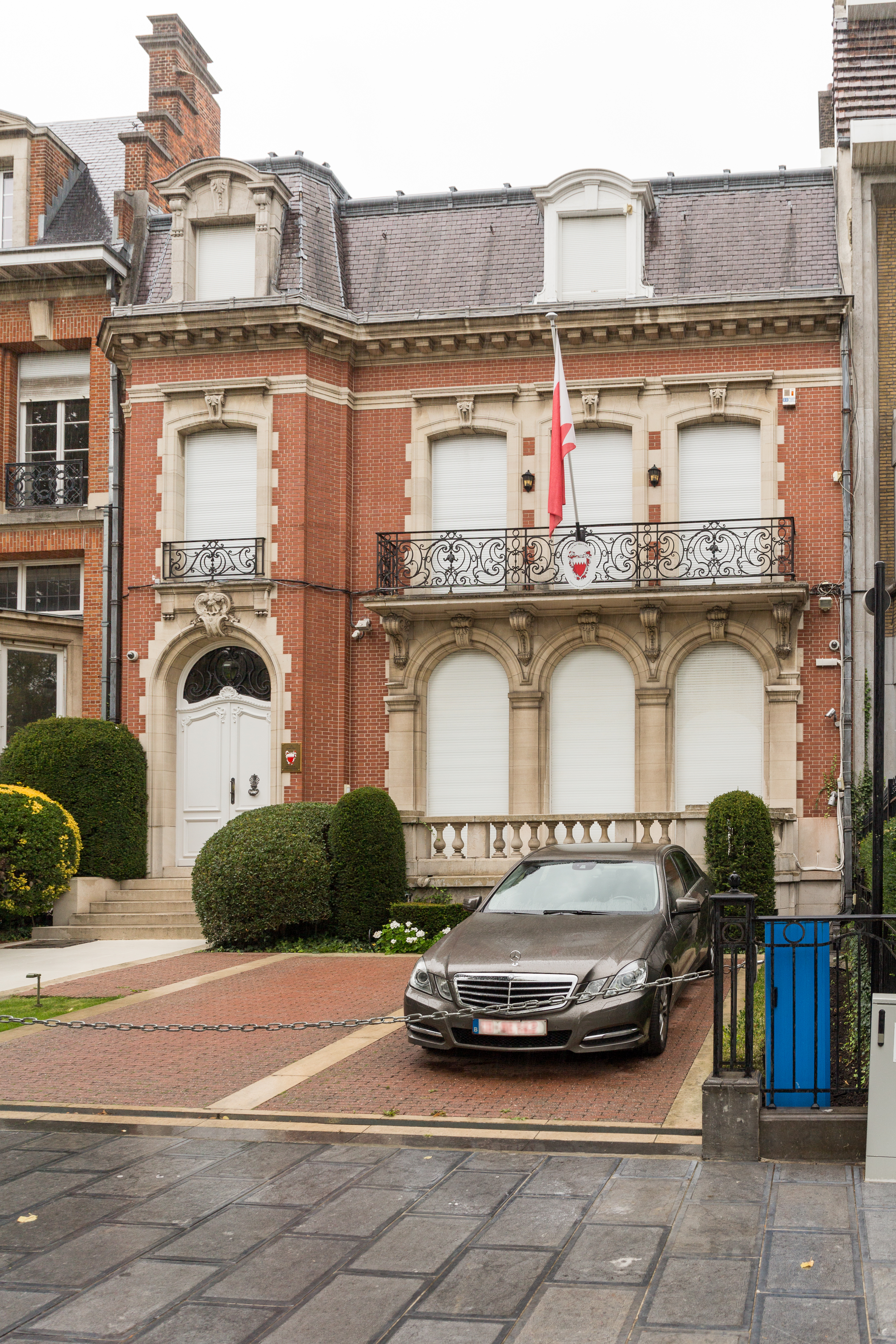
Embassy in Brussels

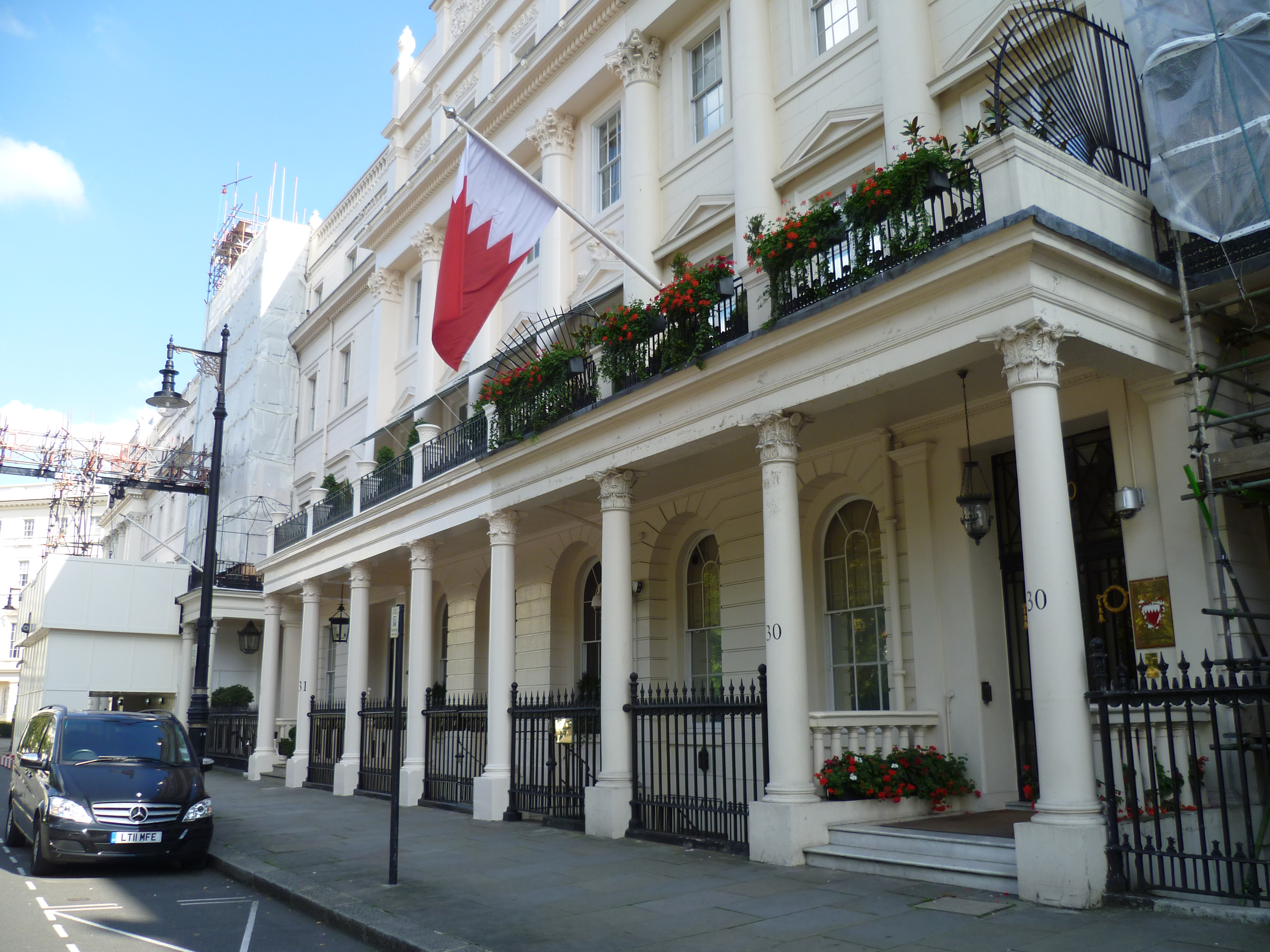
Embassy in London

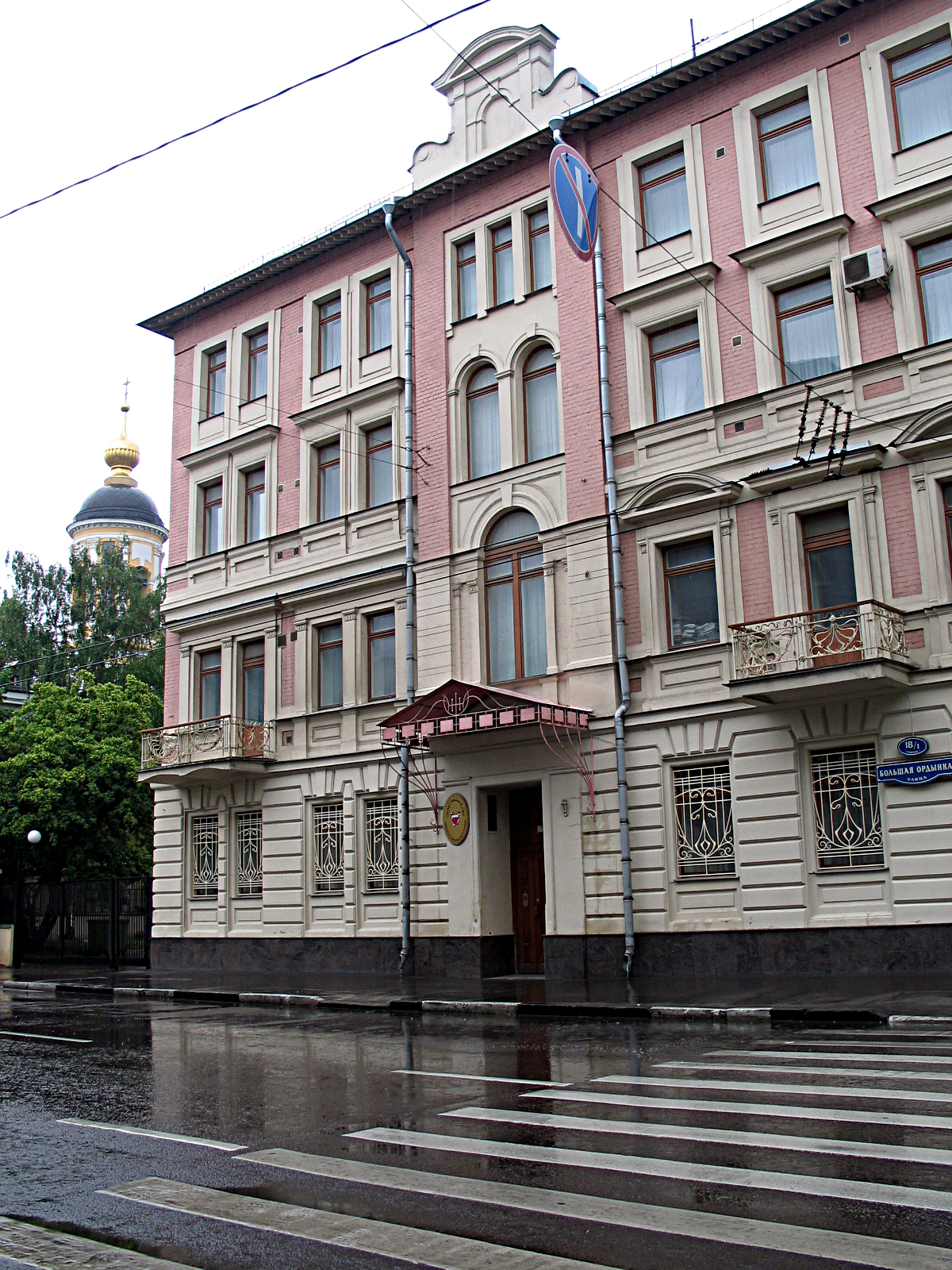
Embassy in Moscow

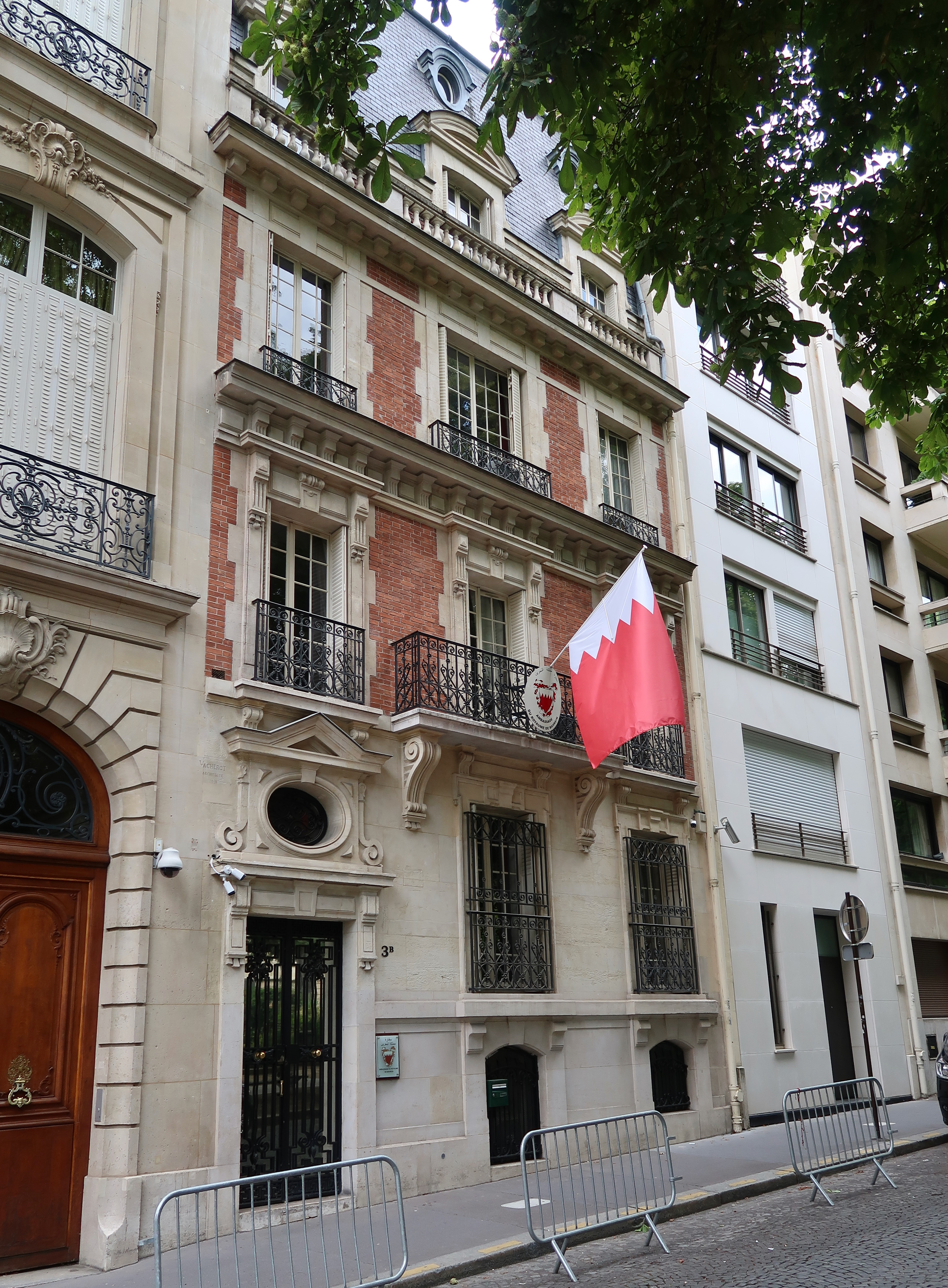
Embassy in Paris

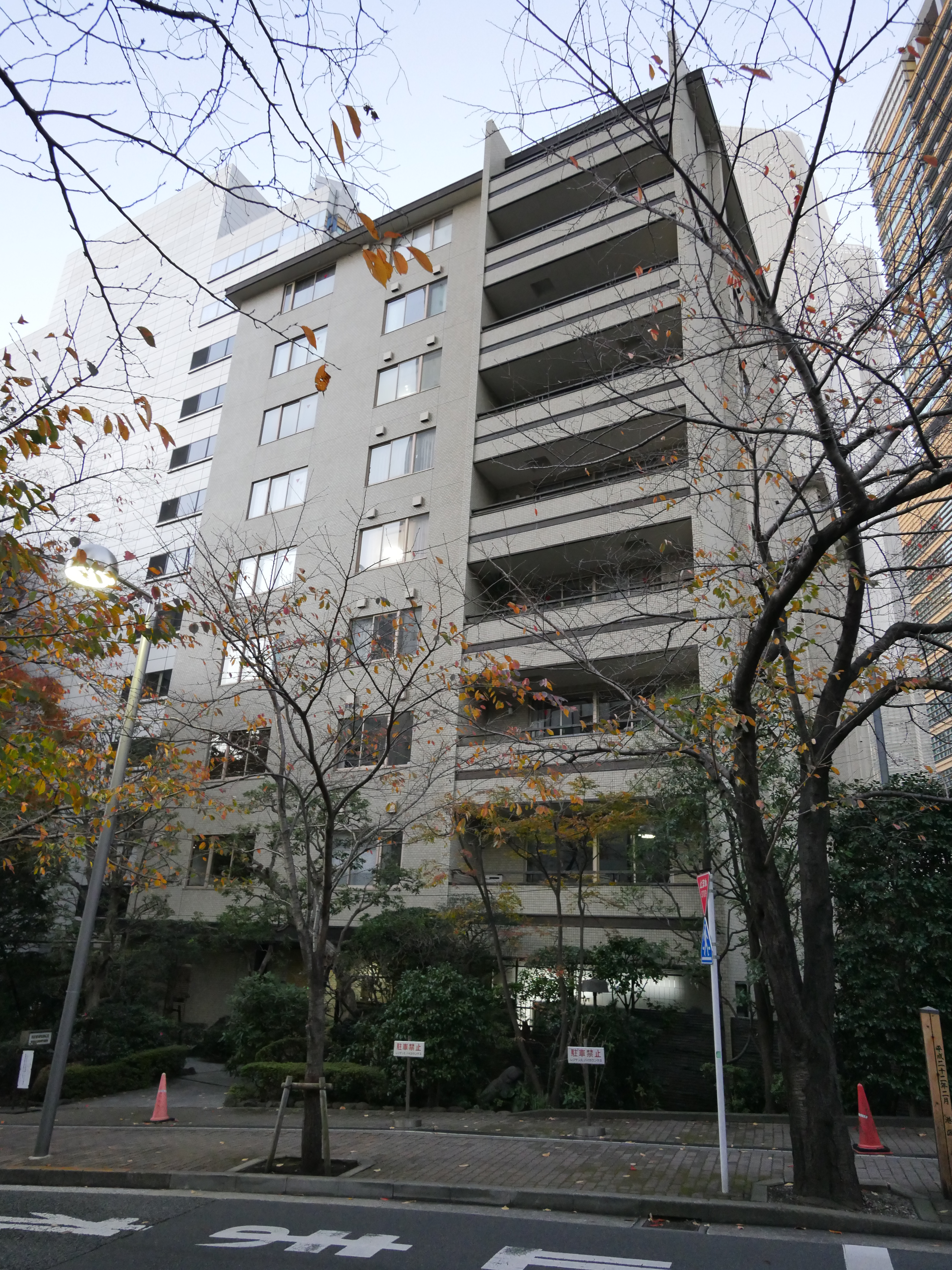
Building hosting the Embassy in Tokyo

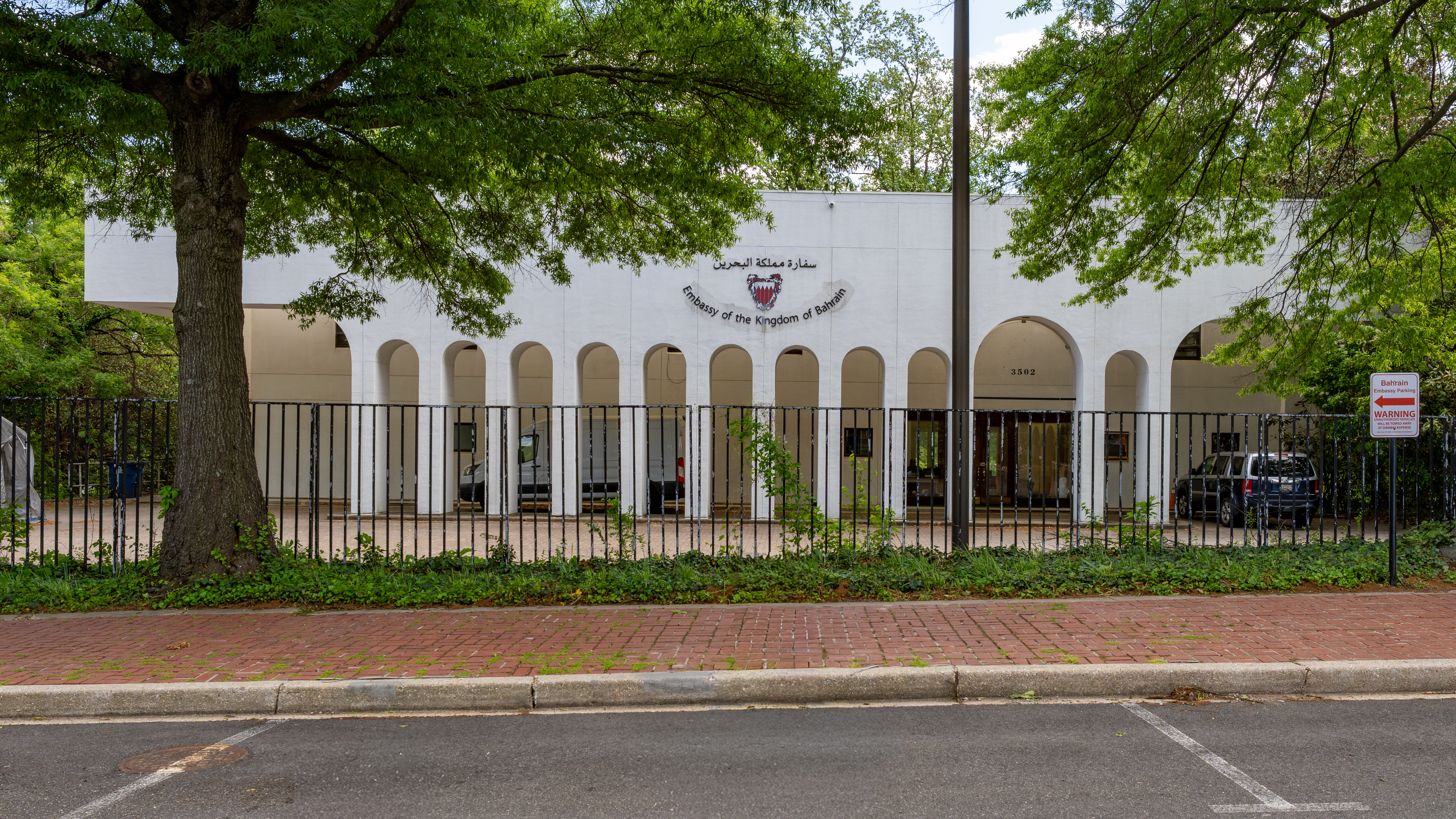
Embassy in Washington, D.C.

== See also ==
- Foreign relations of Bahrain
- List of diplomatic missions in Bahrain
- Visa policy of Bahrain
