= Abdullah bin Rashid Al Khalifa =

Bahraini diplomat

Shaikh Abdullah bin Rashid Al Khalifa is the Bahraini ambassador to the United States.

== Career ==
Abdullah Al Khalifa began his career in the Royal Court of the Kingdom of Bahrain, where he initially oversaw educational affairs. In 2010, he was appointed as the Governor of the Southern Governorate of Bahrain, the largest governorate in the Kingdom.

== Awards ==
- Honorary Distinction Award 2016, for his service and contributions as Governor
- Stevie Award 2019, for his work in the founding and developing of the Drug Abuse Resistance Education D.A.R.E. program, Maan (together) program against violence and addiction

== Personal ==
Al Khalifa resides at the Bahrain Ambassador's Residence in McLean, Virginia, with his wife, Shaikha Aisha bint Jaber Al Khalifa, and their five children.
