= Bahrain–Israel relations =

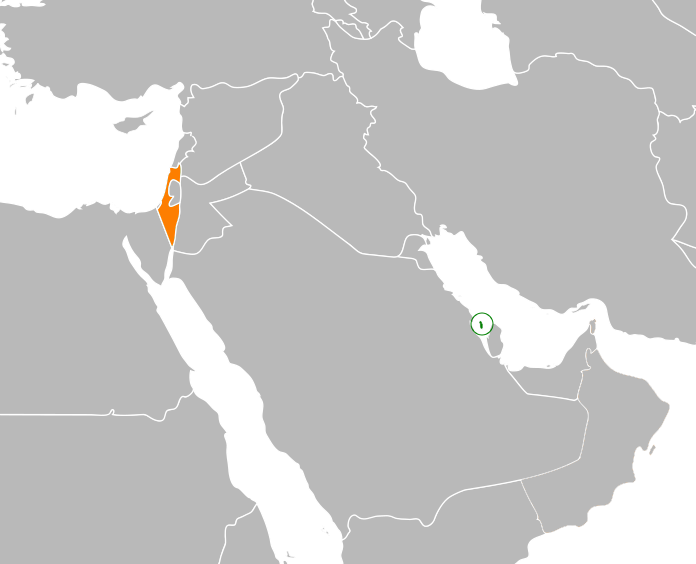

- Bahrain: Israel

Relations have existed between Bahrain and Israel since Bahrain achieved its independence in 1971. In recent years, relations between the two countries have been thawing, and the countries agreed to normalize relations in September 2020. The foreign minister of Bahrain Khalid bin Ahmed Al Khalifa has been quoted saying "Israel is part of the heritage of this whole region, historically. So, the Jewish people have a place amongst us." The common threat of Iran has provided common ground for a thaw in what were once tense relations. Bahrain's foreign policy traditionally supports the creation of an independent Palestinian state. Bahrain has an embassy in Tel Aviv. Israel has an embassy in Manama.

== History ==
Following their independence from the British rule in 1971, Bahrain became part of the Arab League boycott of Israel. Later on, Bahrain sent representatives to the Madrid Conference of 1991.

The first official Israeli delegation to visit Bahrain was in late September 1994, when Yossi Sarid, Israel's Minister for the Environment, took part in regional discussions on environmental issues and met with Bahrain's foreign minister. However, trade missions were opened in both capitals after the Oslo I Accord, though they were closed after Al-Aqsa Intifada, which erupted in 2000.

Bahrain abandoned its boycott of Israel in 2005, in exchange for a free trade agreement with the United States. In September 2017, the King of Bahrain, Hamad bin Isa Al Khalifa, denounced the Arab League boycott of Israel, saying that the kingdom's citizens were entitled to visit Israel, even though the two countries had no diplomatic relations.

In October 2007, Bahrain Foreign Minister Khalid Alkhalifa held a meeting with the American Jewish Committee where he said "Palestinian refugees should return to Palestine". In the same month during the General Assembly of the UN, he met with then-foreign minister Tzipi Livni drawing heavy criticism from the Bahraini parliament.

=== Wikileaks ===
In 2011, amid Arab spring uprising, Wikileaks cables published on Haaretz revealed some of the hidden relations between Bahraini and Israeli officials. In a meeting with the U.S. ambassador in February 2005, Bahrain's king, Hamad bin Isa Al Khalifa had bragged about having contact with Israel's national intelligence agency, Mossad. He indicated that Bahrain is ready to develop relations in other fields as well. The king reportedly gave orders that official statements don't use phrases such as "enemy" and "Zionist entity" when referring to Israel anymore. However, he refused the idea of having trade relations, saying it was "too early" and would be postponed until the establishment of an independent Palestinian state.

== Normalization of relations ==
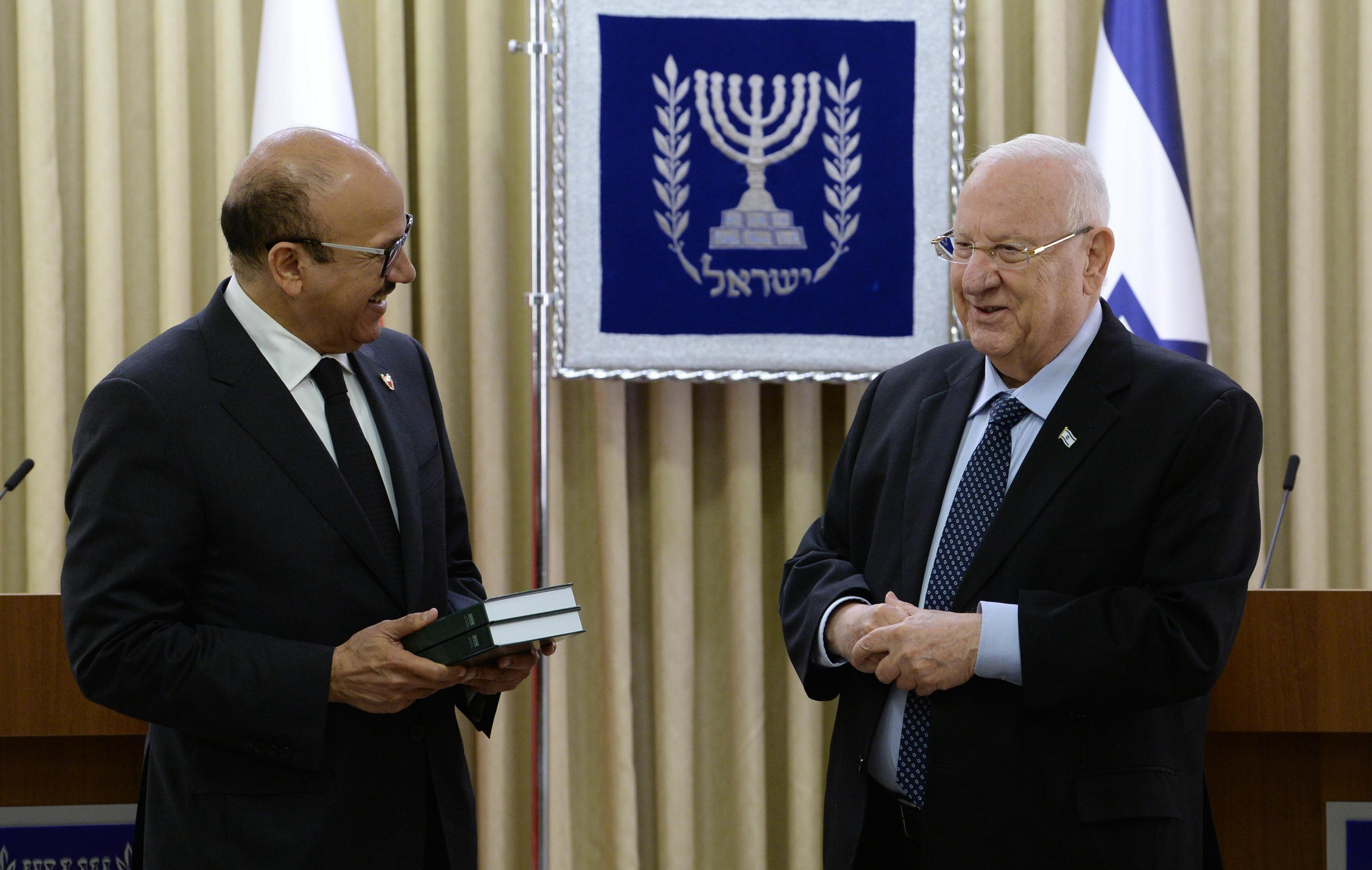
Reuven Rivlin meeting with the Foreign Minister of the Kingdom of Bahrain Jerusalem, November 2020,

Following a video of a ceremony to mark the Jewish Hanukkah holiday hosted by Bahrain that went viral in 2016, Hamad bin Isa Al Khalifah, during an event hosted by Simon Wiesenthal Center on September 18, 2017, in Los Angeles, denounced the Arab League boycott of Israel and began normalizing relations following Prime Minister Benjamin Netanyahu's announcement of normalizing relations with the Arab world. In effect, it allows Bahraini citizens to visit Israel whenever its necessary. If the two countries begin establishing diplomatic relations, Bahrain would be the fourth Arab country and the second Arab country in the Persian Gulf region to grant recognition to the State of Israel (the others being Egypt in 1979, Jordan in 1994 and the United Arab Emirates in 2020; the Palestinian National Authority in 1993 also recognized Israel).

In May 2018, Bahrain recognized Israel's right to exist. Manama authorities denied reports that this was due to tensions with Iran, and said the country remains committed to the Arab Peace Initiative.

In June 2019, six Israeli media outlets received formal invitations to cover the Israeli-Palestinian economic peace workshop in Bahrain. In July 2019, Foreign Minister of Bahrain, Khalid bin Ahmed Al Khalifa, and his Israeli counterpart, Israel Katz, met in the United States. In October 2019, an Israeli official, Dana Benvenisti-Gabay, attended the "Working Group on Maritime and Aviation Security" in Manama, Bahrain. In December 2019, Jerusalem chief rabbi, Shlomo Amar, visited Bahrain for an interfaith event.

King Hamad told visiting US Secretary of State Mike Pompeo that his country is committed to the creation of a Palestinian state and dismissed Washington's push for Arab countries to normalize relations with Israel. However, on 11 September 2020, it was announced that Bahrain and Israel had agreed to establish full diplomatic relations. Remarking on the date of the announcement, U.S. President Donald Trump said, “There’s no more powerful response to the hatred that spawned 9/11.” The agreement was signed on September 15, 2020, at the White House in Washington, D.C. On 18 October 2020, an Israeli delegation led by National Security Adviser Meir Ben-Shabbat traveled to Manama, Bahrain, to sign a joint communique of establishing diplomatic relations.

In March 2021, Bahrain appointed Khaled Yousif al-Jalahma as its first ambassador to Israel. He arrived in Israel to take up his post at the end of August 2021.

In September 2021, Israel opened a resident embassy in Manama. In September 2023, Israeli Foreign Minister Eli Cohen visited Manama and officially reopened Israel's new embassy to replace the first one.

On 2 November 2023, in view of the ongoing Gaza war, Bahrain said in a statement that the Israeli ambassador left Bahrain, that Bahrain recalled its ambassador to Israel, and suspended all economic relations with Israel, citing a "solid and historical stance that supports the Palestinian cause and the legitimate rights of the Palestinian people." The statement was made by Bahrain's parliament and Israel said they had no knowledge of the decision.

== See also ==
- Foreign relations of Bahrain
- Foreign relations of Israel
- History of the Jews in Bahrain
