= Bahrain–European Union relations =

Bahraini—European relations

- European Union: Bahrain

Bahrain–European Union relations are the international relations between the Kingdom of Bahrain in the Persian Gulf and the European Union (EU).

== History ==
Bahrain, as part of the Gulf Cooperation Council (GCC), signed a cooperation agreement with the EU in 1988. This paved the way for closer economic and political relations. In 2013, the GCC and EU ministerial meeting occurred in Manama and was co-chaired by the EU High Representative-Vice President Catherine Ashton and the Bahraini Foreign Minister Shaikh Khalid bin Ahmed Al Khalifa.

Bahrain has been criticised by the EU for its treatment of political activists during and after the 2011 Bahraini uprising.

== Environment ==
In May 2015, Bahrain and the EU have expressed interest in hosting joint environmental projects, which includes preservation of the country's biodiversity and a review of environmental legislation.

== Trade ==
The EU is the GCC's largest trading partner, valued at €152 billion which accounts for over 13% of total exports. In turn, the GCC is the EU's fifth largest export market, which is worth €95 billion.

Since 1990, the GCC and EU have entered negotiations for a free trade agreement. However, recurrent disputes have resulted in the talks being suspended by the GCC multiple times, the most recent of which being in 2008.

== Bahrain's foreign relations with EU member states ==
- Austria
- Belgium
- Bulgaria
- Croatia
- Cyprus
- Czech Republic
- Denmark
- Estonia
- Finland
- France
- Germany
- Greece
- Hungary
- (Republic of Ireland) Ireland
- Italy
- Latvia
- Lithuania
- Luxembourg
- Malta
- Netherlands
- Poland
- Portugal
- Romania
- Slovakia
- Slovenia
- Spain
- Sweden

== See also ==
- Foreign relations of Bahrain
- Foreign relations of the European Union
