= Bahrain–United Kingdom relations =

- Bahrain: United Kingdom

Bahrain–United Kingdom relations are the bilateral relations between Bahrain and the United Kingdom. Bahrain has an embassy in London and the United Kingdom is one of only four European countries to maintain an embassy in Manama. Bahrain gained independence from the United Kingdom in 1971 and has since maintained strong diplomatic, military and trade relations.

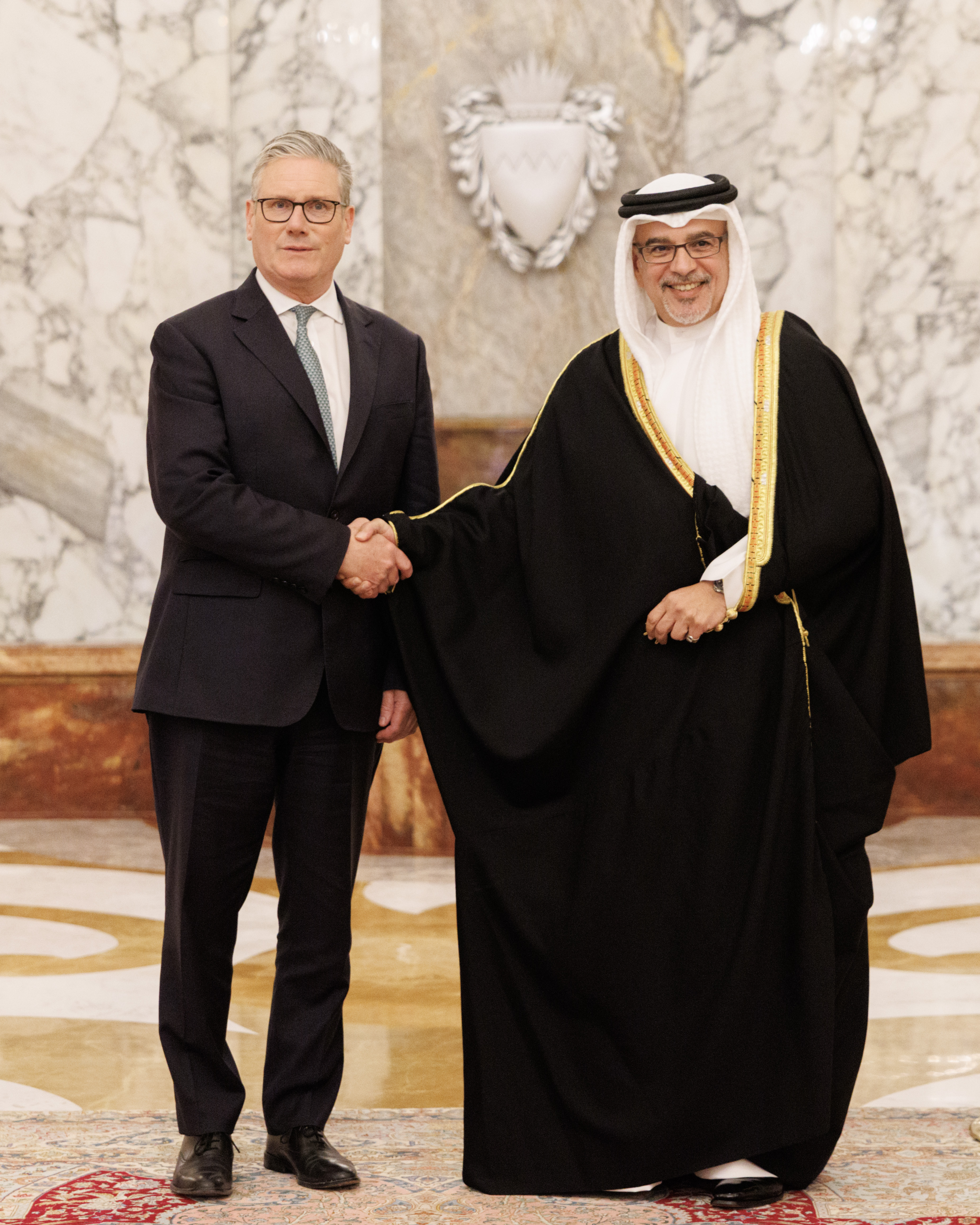
British Prime Minister Keir Starmer with the Bahraini Crown Prince and Prime Minister Salman bin Hamad Al Khalifa in April 2026.

== History ==
=== Early treaties ===
At the beginning of the nineteenth century, Britain, then the dominant power in the region, was attempting to end piracy in the Persian Gulf to secure maritime trading routes to its East India Company in the Indies. In 1805, the ruling House of Khalifa offered to support Britain against Persians in exchange for occasional help by British gunships. Their request was backed by the British Resident in Muscat, but the Government of India rejected it. In 1816, the British Political Resident, (Note: The Political Resident was the main British officer in the Persian Gulf region. He was under the jurisdiction of both the Foreign Office and the Government of India. The full title of the position is "Her Britannic Majesty's Political Resident in the Persian Gulf and Consul-General for Fars and Khuzistan".) William Bruce signed an unofficial agreement with Al Khalifa in which Britain was to remain neutral in the war between Oman and Bahrain. Four years later, Bruce refused to guarantee a truce agreement between Bahrain and Oman.

In 1820, Britain signed the General Maritime Treaty with tribal chiefs of the Persian Gulf, including Al Khalifa (at their request). By signing this treaty, Britain recognised Al Khalifa as "legitimate" rulers of Bahrain. In 1822, Britain peacefully prevented an imminent war between Bahrain and Oman. Between 1820 and 1850, Al Khalifa repeatedly tried to persuade British authorities to provide full protection to Bahrain against external threats, but without avail. Britain wanted Bahrain to remain an independent state. The situation changed in 1859–60, when the Khalifa ruler appealed to the Persians and Ottomans to provide protection, and in 1861 blockaded Al-Hasa, a coastal oasis in Eastern Arabia. This prompted the British in 1861 to force the ruler to sign a Perpetual Truce of Peace and Friendship; under its terms the ruler of Bahrain was not to engage in "prosecution of war, piracy and slavery at sea" and Britain was to provide maritime protection. The treaty also recognised the Khalifa ruler as an "independent ruler".

Six years later, in 1867–8, the British navy intervened after a Bahraini attack on Qatar. After two years, in 1869, they intervened again to end an internal struggle over power, and appointed Shaikh Isa ibn Ali Al Khalifa, then aged 21 as ruler of Bahrain. In subsequent years, the British exercised increasing control over Shaikh Isa's communications with foreign powers, especially the Ottomans, which had claims over Bahrain and Qatar. Between 1878 and 1880, the British failed to protect Bahrain against pirates operating from lands claimed by the Ottomans. They also prevented Shaikh Isa from defending Zubarah, a center of trade and pearl fishing sited midway between the Strait of Hormuz and the west arm of the Gulf, against a land attack, in order to avoid a confrontation with the Ottomans, who supported the Al-Abdulla (a branch of Al Khalifa which had been banished from Bahrain after a feud over power). The increasing Ottoman influence in the region threatened the status quo in Bahrain and prompted Colonel E.C. Ross, the British Resident, to sign a new treaty with Bahrain on 22 December 1880. The treaty prohibited the ruler of Bahrain from negotiating, signing treaties or accepting any form of diplomatic representation with foreign powers without British consent, with the exception of "customary friendly correspondence .. of minor importance". It did not refer to Bahrain's independence. (Note: The text of the treaty read as follows: "I, Isa bin Ali Al Khalifeh, Chief of Bahrein, hereby bind myself and successors in the Government of Bahrein to the British Government to abstain from entering into negotiations or making treaties of any sort with any State or Government other than the British without the consent of the said British Government, and to refuse permission to any other Government than the British to establish diplomatic to consular agencies or coaling depots in our territory, unless with the consent of the British Government. This engagement does not apply to or affect the customary friendly correspondence with the local authorities of neighbouring States on business of minor importance".)

Fearing the increasing Ottoman activity and French influence in the region, Britain signed a new treaty with Bahrain in 1892 which further limited the foreign relations of the ruler by prohibiting disposal of territory to any foreign power other than Britain. It also prohibited the minor communications exempted by the 1880 treaty. The treaties of 1880 and 1892 effectively turned Bahrain into a British protectorate, giving the British control over defence and foreign relations. The ruler was also to accept British "advice" regarding internal matters. During this period, Bahrain was the center of British commercial operations in the region. Between 1829 and 1904, the Persian Gulf Residency appointed an Assistant post in Bahrain. It was occupied by natives until 1900 when a Britisher was assigned to the post to accommodate the increase in British trade and attract British companies. The British were mainly concerned with their commercial interests and paid little attention to Bahraini internal affairs. Britain is credited by historians for the stability and growth Bahrain experienced in the latter half of the 19th century.

=== Increasing British protection ===
In 1903, Lord Curzon, the Viceroy of India, visited Bahrain and highlighted the need to reform the customs – which were in a state of chaos – by appointing a British director. (Note: Customs was run by an Indian firm and accounts were kept in Sindhi language. Big merchants were only required to pay a small fee, while small merchants were "weighted heavily". One British official thought it was so disorganised that he compared it with Augean Stables. The British point of view was that appointing a British director was not only "the best way to regularize customs", but was also a way to strengthen British control over Bahrain without direct rule, which would have provoked the Persians and Ottomans. It could also help them curb the trade of arms and slaves.) When Shaikh Isa resisted what he considered an interference, Curzon told him the British were persisting in their demands. Complaints about the customs had been made as early as 1885 and remained a popular topic for British officials until the implementation of the administrative reforms in the 1920s. Throughout this period, Shaikh Isa resisted British control over customs, in order to remain financially independent. In 1904, the post of British Assistant was elevated to British Political Agent.

On 29 September, followers of Ali ibn Ahmed Al Khalifa, a nephew of Shaikh Isa, attacked clerks working for a German trading firm. Ali himself attacked the German trader. On 14 November, his followers attacked and severely injured several Persians. The Political Agent asked Shaikh Isa to punish the aggressors and compensate the victims, but Shaikh Isa refused. After failing to get justice in Bahrain, the victimised parties referred their cases to the German consul in the Persian port city of Bushehr and the Persian Secretary for Foreign Affairs respectively.

Fearing that these incidents would allow foreign powers to "gain an opening for assailing [the British] regime", Major Percy Cox, the Acting Political Resident in the Persian Gulf visited Bahrain in a navy fleet on 30 November. (Note: In addition to being the Political Resident between 1905 and 1913, Cox was also appointed as High commissioner for Mesopotamia, Foreign Secretary of India and Minister to Persia.) Shaikh Isa agreed to punish those behind the attack on the German firm, but not those who attacked the Persians. After consultations with higher British authorities, Cox returned to Bahrain in a great show of force on 23 February 1905. He issued an ultimatum ending on 25 February. Cox demanded deporting Ali, compensating the Persians, prohibiting forced labour of foreigners, and adhering to advisories from the British Political Agent. He threatened to fire on the capital city of Manama if Shaikh Isa did not comply.

Shaikh Isa agreed to the demands on 26 February, after Cox had fired a few blank shots on the major port city of Manama. (Note: Although Shaikh Isa had submitted to Cox's demands in 1905, he only acknowledged them officially in 1909.) In secret, however, he allegedly forewarned Ali of his inevitable arrest. Finding that Ali was gone, Cox took the heir apparent, Shaikh Hamad, as hostage, imposed house arrest on Shaikh Isa and confiscated Ali's properties. He then arrested Jassim al-Mihza, the influential Sunni judge. Three days later, Cox was satisfied with the results as the population submitted to the British. (Note: Littlefield wrote that this incident "was reported to have left a profound impression on the people".) Shaikh Hamad and al-Mihza were released and Shaikh Isa was freed from house arrest. Ali surrendered himself in July and was deported to British Bombay in September.

In January 1906, Cox extended the jurisdiction of the British Political Agent to Persians when he ruled that a Persian who was caught stealing from a British ship harboured in Bahrain fell under British jurisdiction. In April, the British further extended their jurisdiction to include Jews and native Christians after the former group complained of harassment over taxes by Shaikh Isa. According to one British official, all these judicial powers were "not authorized by any law".

The full implications of these actions were not realised at first. Because all "foreigners" were placed under the British jurisdiction, an often-conflicted dual authority was created, one led by the ruler, the other by the British Political Agency. During the time, there was an increasing number of foreigners due to the pearl boom which was coupled with stability. At the same time, the term "foreigner" lacked a precise definition; both Shaikh Isa and the British claimed non-Bahraini Arabs and native-born Baharnah as their subjects. (Note: By 1911, all foreign groups, including non-Bahraini Arabs, were under British jurisdiction.) Shaikh Isa's motivations were political as well as financial, as he charged 10% of all legal fees. Shaikh Isa's reaction to this change was to postpone any reform to the customs which he thought of as "the darlings of British trade".

The British attempted to use this atmosphere to their advantage; Captain F.B. Prideaux, the newly appointed Political Agent, had been developing plans for administrative reforms. Unlike other British officials, he did not suggest changes in the customs or internal authority of Al Khalifa. Instead, Prideaux proposed that reforms be focused on "ending local tyranny" in the form of forced labour, and judicial and financial corruption. His proposals were the basis of the Bahrain Order in Council, a document issued in 1913 that secured the legal status of Britain in Bahrain. At first, these plans were rejected by Cox, who thought they were premature. British officials thought that by 1908 Shaikh Isa would be forced to accept reforms in the customs due to the expiration of Banyan merchants contracts. However, in January 1908, the customs revenue increased when Shaikh Isa appointed local officials.

=== Bahrain Order in Council and World War I ===
Before late 1907, the British had not openly declared Bahrain a formal protectorate; instead they considered it under their protection. The Foreign Office refused to use "strict terms" to define the status of Bahrain. But in private correspondents between British officials, the term "protectorate" was often used since 1890s. (Note: One of the first uses of the term dates to November 1892. In 1898, the British Political Resident stated that "the status of Bahrein towards the British Government of India is identical with that of protected Native States of India".) On 14 November 1907, the Government of India requested issuing an Order in Council for Bahrain in light of the growing British jurisdiction over foreigners. Rising foreign interests and trade in the region, especially those of Germans, was another important motivation. In the request, the Government of India acknowledged that the treaty of 1880 had turned Bahrain into "a sort of protectorate".

In February 1908, the Foreign Office questioned whether administrative reforms could be carried out along with formally acknowledging the increased British jurisdiction over Bahrain, so that the latter might not provoke any hostile reactions from other foreign powers. In March, a committee headed by John Morley, the Secretary of State for India, was formed. It concluded in its final report that Bahrain was in fact a British "visual Protectorate" (but did not see fit to declare it so publicly) and that the Order in Council should be issued following written consent from Shaikh Isa over the new status of British jurisdiction over foreigners. The report was approved in February 1909 and in addition to its recommendations, the Government of India was tasked on May with preparing a draft for the Order in Council. Shaikh Isa's consent was secured in July, however for various reasons, the draft was only submitted in June 1911. Further negotiations with Shiakh Isa and the Ottomans delayed the approval of the Order in Council until 12 August 1913.

The Bahrain Order in Council (BOIC) was published in The London Gazette on 15 August. (Note: The publication at this time was by mistake and it was only published in India in February 1915. This prompted criticism from British authorities in the Persian Gulf who wanted to delay it due to fears of the Ottomans negative reaction. In addition, Shaikh Isa still resisted British jurisdiction over non-Bahrainis.) It provided legal cover for British jurisdiction over foreigners. It also limited the powers of the ruler and gave the Political Agent far reaching jurisdiction, including over religious law courts. John Marlowe stated that this had equated Bahrain's status with a British colony and the British Political Resident's power with that of a Colonial Governor. Littlefield wrote that the BOIC had made Bahrain "in all but name, a British colony" and that it aroused anti-British feelings. Six law courts were to be formed: the Chief Court (Muslims), the District Court (foreigners), the Joint Court (Bahrainis vs foreigners), al-Majlis al-Urfi (only when disputing parties agreed to refer to it), Salifa Court (concerned with pearl-diving) and Kazi's Court, to which cases could be referred from other courts. The applicable law was to be the law of British India with some amendments. However, the BOIC was suspended due to negotiations with Ottomans and the outbreak of the First World War. It was only put into effect in February 1919, announcing the start of the administrative reforms.

A few months before the war, Bahrain granted Britain exclusive oil concessions. During the war, most Bahrainis were not supportive of the Allies, though they were at war with the Ottomans. The British thought this was due to British lack of attention toward oppression of native Bahrainis and suspension of reforms. (Note: Littlefield wrote that since the year 1917, there was an attitude of misgovernment and Baharnah mistreatment.) These anti-British feelings were another reason for delaying implementation of the Order in Council until after the war. On the other hand, Shaikh Isa and his family, especially his younger son, Shaikh Abdulla, were loyal to the British. (Note: With the exception of one attempt by Shaikh Isa to contact the Ottomans.) Shaikh Isa was given the Companion (CIE) and Knight Commander (KCIE) of the Order of the Indian Empire in 1915 and 1919 respectively. Shaikh Abdulla too was given CIE in 1915.

The situation within Bahrain was calm, but the economic times were very hard; the customs income decreased by 80%, 5,000 died due to plague in Manama and in the capital Muharraq, and many others emigrated. Many were brought to the "brink of famine" due to India's ban on exporting rice and the subsequent increase in the price of staple commodities. Shaikh Isa responded in 1917 by borrowing from merchants, increasing the customs tax and dispossessing the Shia Muslims, who were now the only non-Sunni group which did not enjoy British protection. At the time, Britain responded to external threats from the Wahhabis, Ottomans and Persians by tightening its grip over Bahrain. Ottomans and Persians had longstanding claims over the island. Following the end of the war, Persian media launched a campaign calling for a stop to the oppressive policies against their co-religious Shia. By the end of the war, the Persian Gulf became "a British lake", as all enemies of Britain were defeated and its control was therefore left unchallenged. This marked a shift in the British policy in Bahrain toward more intervention in the island's internal affairs.

=== Post-World War I ===
The main British naval base in the Persian Gulf region was moved to Bahrain in 1935 shortly after the start of large-scale oil production.

In 1970, Iran laid claim to Bahrain and the other Persian Gulf islands. The British Government then persuaded Iran to drop its claim to the island of Bahrain. However, in an agreement with the United Kingdom it agreed "not to pursue" its claims on Bahrain if its other claims were realised. In the same year, the United Nations reported that "the Bahrainis were virtually unanimous in wanting a fully independent sovereign state. During the withdrawal of British forces from the Gulf region between 1968 and December 1971, Commander British Forces Gulf had a contingency plan in place known as "Helix" to protect Bahrain, Qatar, and the Trucial States from any possible threats (including Iran). This would have involved the deployment of British ground and air units primarily to Bahrain or the Emirate of Sharjah. A Royal Navy aircraft carrier from the Far East would also be sent to the Gulf.

The following plebiscite saw Bahrainis confirm their Arab identity and independence from Britain. Bahrain was to declare itself fully independent on 15 August 1971.

== Diaspora ==
7,000 Britons work in Bahrain making it the largest European community of expatriates. There are also more than 2,000 Bahraini students studying in Britain.

== Trade ==
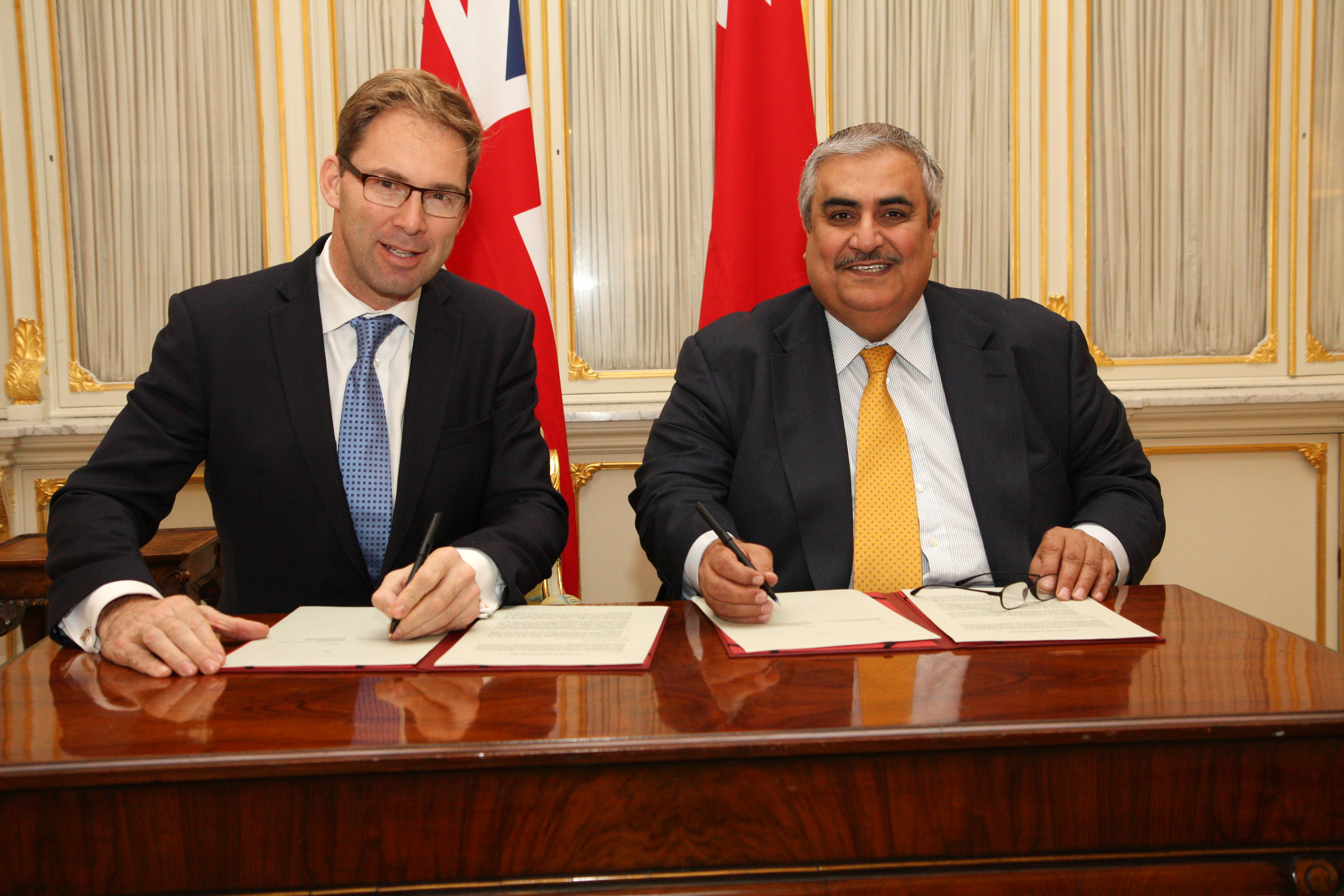
British Minister of State for Middle East and North Africa Tobias Ellwood and Bahraini Minister of Foreign Affairs Khalid bin Ahmed Al Khalifa sign the UK-Bahrain Assistance Program 2015 in London on 25 November 2015.

In 2012, bilateral trade between the countries was worth £884 million.

In mid-2021, British MPs called on the UK government to suspend all assistance and "secretive" multi-million pound funding programs to Bahrain amid the concerns of Britain being complicit in the human rights abuses taking place in Bahrain. In response to the brutal crackdown against prisoners in Bahrain's Jau prison in April, UK MPs tabled a motion urging the British government to "suspend technical assistance" to oversight bodies in Bahrain.

== Agreements ==
In 2006, Bahrain and the United Kingdom signed an agreement for the promotion of protection investments which was designed "to create favourable conditions for greater investment by nationals and companies of one State in the territory of the other State."

On 13 June 2007, a co-operation agreement was signed between Bahrain Stock Exchange and the London Stock Exchange.

On 11 October 2012, a defence co-operation agreement was signed between Bahrain and the United Kingdom to promote intelligence sharing, education, scientific and technical co-operation and joint training of military forces.

== See also ==
- Foreign relations of United Kingdom
- Foreign relations of Bahrain

== Notes and references ==
=== Bibliography ===
- Al-Tajir, Mahdi Abdalla (1987). Bahrain, 1920–1945: Britain, the Shaikh, and the Administration. Croom Helm. ISBN 978-0-7099-5122-3.
- Field, Michael (March 2013). "Tree of Al-Khalifa". Arabian Charts. (subscription required)
- Al-Rumaihi, Mohammed Ghanim (1975). Bahrain: A study on social and political change since the First World War. University of Kuwait. ASIN B0007AO482. LCCN 79110522.
- al-Nabhani, Mohammad Khalifa (1999) [First published 1923]. التحفة النبهانية في تاريخ الجزيرة العربية [The Nabhani's Marvel in the History of Arabian Peninsula] (in Arabic). Beirut, Lebanon: Dar Ihya' Al Ulum Publishings.
- Khayri, Nasir bin Jawher bin Mubarak (2003) [Written in early 1920s]. al-Shuqair, Abdulrahman bin Abdulla (ed.). قلائد النحرين في تاريخ البحرين [Pendants of sacrifices in the history of Bahrain] (in Arabic). Manama, Bahrain: Al Ayam Foundation for Press, Printing and Publishing. ISBN 9789990102604.
- Radhi, Hassan Ali (1 January 2003). Judiciary and Arbitration in Bahrain: A Historical and Analytical Study. Brill Publishers. ISBN 90-411-2217-6.
- Onley, James (March 2009). "The Raj Reconsidered: British India's Informal Empire and Spheres of Influence in Asia and Africa". Asian Affairs. 40. Royal Society for Asian Affairs: 44–62. doi:10.1080/03068370802658666. S2CID 162217901.
- Marlowe, John Psued (1962). The Persian Gulf in the twentieth century. Praeger. OCLC 164687436.
- Rush, Alan de Lacy (1991). Bahrain: The Ruling Family of Al-Khalifah. Archive Editions. ISBN 978-1-85207-310-7.
- Almahmood, Mahmood (9 May 2013). The rise and fall of Bahrain's merchants in the pre-oil era (PDF) (MSc thesis). American University. Archived from the original (PDF) on 10 June 2015.
- Al Sha'er, Sawsan Ali; Jassim, Mohammed Abdulqader (2000). البحرين... قصة الصراع السياسي 1904–1956 [Bahrain... story of the political struggle 1904–1956] (in Arabic).
- Onley, James (2004). "The Politics of Protection in the Gulf: The Arab Rulers and the British Resident in the Nineteenth Century". New Arabian Studies. University of Exeter Press.
- Farah, Talal Toufic (1985). Protection and politics in Bahrain, 1869–1915. American University of Beirut. ISBN 0-8156-6074-X.
- Busch, Briton Cooper (1967). Britain and the Persian Gulf, 1894–1914. University of California Press. LCCN 67024120. OCLC 626554.
- Fuccaro, Nelida (3 September 2009). Histories of City and State in the Persian Gulf: Manama Since 1800. Cambridge University Press. ISBN 978-0-521-51435-4.
- Khuri, Fuad Ishaq (1980). Tribe and state in Bahrain: The transformation of social and political authority in an Arab state. University of Chicago Press. ISBN 0-226-43473-7.
- Littlefield, Richard E. (1964). Bahrain as a Persian Gulf State: With References to Its Relations with Great Britain and the Province of Al-Hasa (MSc thesis). Beirut, Lebanon: American University of Beirut.
- Baumgartner, Andreas (October 2008). Bahrain – a showcase for political reform in the Middle East? (PDF) (MSc thesis). University of Vienna.
- Onley, James (2005). "Britain's Informal Empire in the Gulf, 1820–1971". Journal of Social Affairs. American University of Sharjah.
- Khalaf, Abdulhadi (13–16 August 1998). Contentious politics in Bahrain: From ethnic to national and vice versa. The fourth Nordic conference on Middle Eastern Studies: The Middle East in globalizing world. Oslo, Norway. Archived from the original on 27 July 2014.
- Al Khalifa, Mai Mohammed (1998). سبزآباد ورجال الدولة البهية – قصة السيطرة البريطانية على الخليج العربي [Sabzabad and the glorious state – The story of British control over the Arabian Gulf] (in Arabic). المؤسسة العربية للدراسات والنشر والتوزيع.
- Rai*c, D. (2002). Statehood and the Law of Self-Determination. Martinus Nijhoff Publishers. ISBN 90-411-1890-X.
