= Bahrain–Turkey relations =

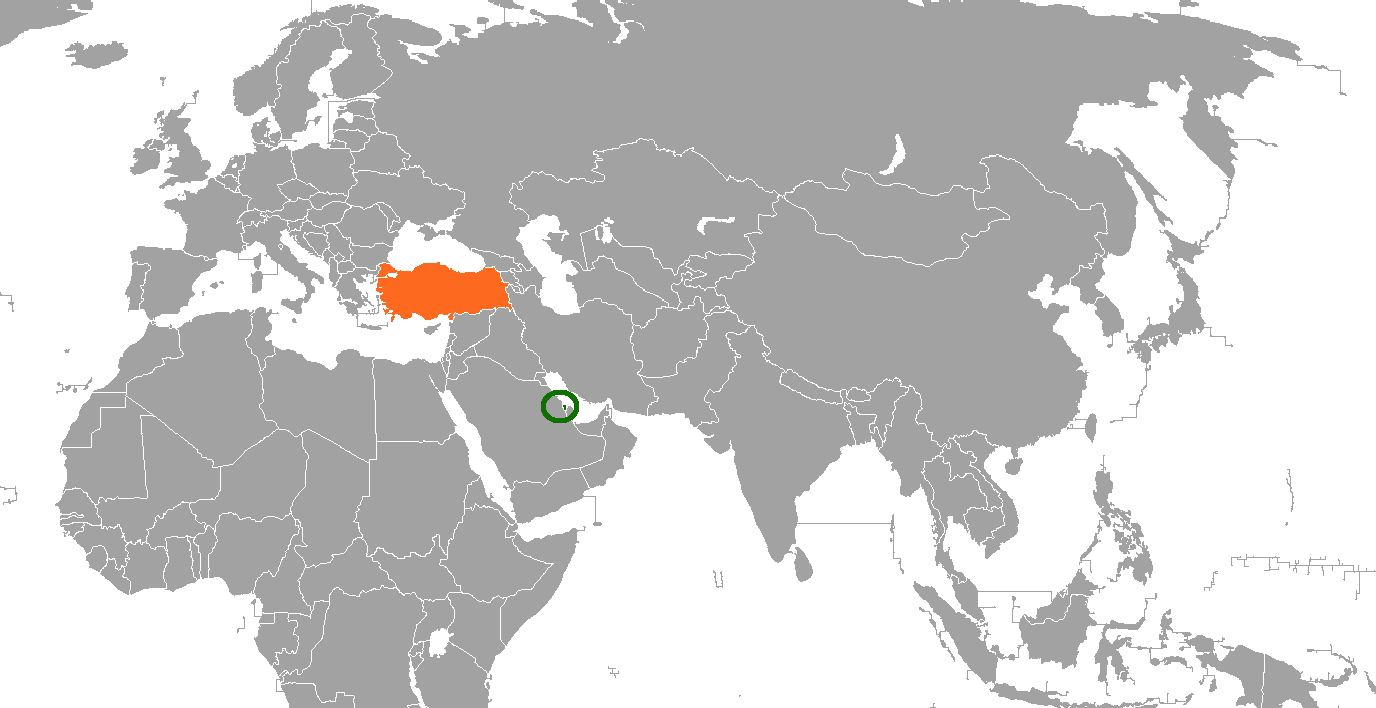

- Bahrain: Turkey

Diplomatic mission
- Embassy of Bahrain, Ankara: Embassy of Turkey, Manama

Envoy
- Ambassador Ibrahim Yusuf Al-Abdullah: Ambassador Esin Çakıl

Foreign relations exist between Bahrain and Turkey. Turkey's historic relationship with Bahrain has wavered between indifference and courtship, but the constant has been a layer of mistrust emanating from both ends that appears to have been set aside in 2002 when the new Turkish government reversed the status quo and embraced a policy of engagement that has successfully catapulted the country to becoming a leading economic player in the Bahrain.

Turkey opened its embassy in Bahrain in 1990, while the Embassy of the Kingdom of Bahrain in Ankara has been in operation since 2008.

== Diplomatic visits ==
Guest	Host	Place of visit	Date of visit
(Bahrain) Foreign Minister Sheikh Khalid bin Ahmad bin Mohammad Al-Khalifa	(Turkey) Minister of Foreign Affairs Mevlüt Çavuşoğlu	Presidential Complex, Ankara	August 25-28, 2016
King of Bahrain Hamad bin Isa Al Khalifa	(Turkey) President Recep Tayyip Erdoğan	Presidential Complex, Ankara	March 25, 2016
(Turkey) President Recep Tayyip Erdoğan	King of Bahrain Hamad bin Isa Al Khalifa	Al-Sakhir Palace, Sakhir	February 12-13, 2017
(Bahrain) Foreign Minister Sheikh Khalid bin Ahmad bin Mohammad Al-Khalifa	(Turkey) Minister of Foreign Affairs Mevlüt Çavuşoğlu	OIC Extraordinary Summit on Al-Quds, Istanbul	May 18, 2018

== Economic and trade relations ==
Bilateral trade and economic relations (in million USD)
	2015	2016	2017	2018
Export	225	193	227	299
Import	104	128	187	187
Volume	329	321	414	486
Balance	121	65	40	112

Turkey mainly exports tobacco and its products, iron and steel, motor vehicles and their parts to Bahrain. On the other hand, Bahrain mainly exports aluminium, iron, petroleum products (except for petroleum and its derivatives) chemical fertilizers, cotton products to Turkey. Trade volume between the two countries was US$486 million in 2018 (Turkish exports/imports: US$299/187 million).

== Cultural relations ==
Turkish television drama have become massively popular across in Bahrain, as millions of Arabs stop everything daily to view the latest episode of shows such as Hareem Al Sultan and Fatima, going a long way to promote a positive image of Turkey in Bahrain.

== Turkish-Bahraini Business Council ==
The Turkish-Bahraini Business Council was established based on the agreement signed by the Union of Chambers and Commodity Exchanges of Turkey (TOBB) and Bahrain Chamber of Commerce and Industry (BCCI) on 16 February 2006 in Istanbul. The first joint meeting of the board of directors of the council was convened on the same day, whereas the last meeting of the council was held on 1 March 2017 in Ankara, just before the JEC meeting (held on 2-3 March 2017).

== See also ==
- List of ambassadors of Turkey to Bahrain
- Foreign relations of Bahrain
- Foreign relations of Turkey
