= Foreign relations of Bahrain =

Bahrain plays a modest, moderating role in regional politics and adheres to the views of the Arab League on Middle East peace and Palestinian rights. Since achieving independence in 1971, Bahrain has maintained friendly relations with most of its neighbours and with the world community. It generally pursues a policy of close consultation with neighbouring states and works to narrow areas of disagreement.

Bahrain is a member of the Cooperation Council for the Arab States of the Gulf (GCC), established on May 26, 1981, with five other Arab Gulf states. The country has fully complied with steps taken by the GCC to coordinate economic development and defense and security planning. In December 1994, it concurred with the GCC decision to drop secondary and tertiary boycotts against Israel. In many instances, it has established special bilateral trade agreements.

Bahrain has been a member of the Forum of Small States (FOSS) since the group's founding in 1992.

Bahrain's current Minister of Foreign Affairs is Abdullatif bin Rashid Al Zayani. Its previous foreign minister was Sheikh Khaled bin Ahmed Al Khalifa, a career diplomat. Sheikh Khaled was educated in the United States, as a student he was a member of US President Jimmy Carter's 1980 presidential campaign team. His deputy was Nazar Al Baharna, a politician and business leader, who was appointed in 2006 following the victory of the biggest Shia party Al Wefaq in that year's parliamentary elections. Al Baharna was formerly a leading member of Al Wefaq.

In June 2006, Bahrain was elected head of the United Nations General Assembly, and used the honour to appoint Haya bint Rashid Al Khalifa as the Assembly's president, making her the first Middle East woman and only the third woman in history to take over the post. Sheikha Haya is a leading Bahraini lawyer and women's rights advocate who took over the post at a time of change for the world body. UN Secretary General Kofi Annan said of her, "I met her yesterday and I found her quite impressive. All the member states are determined to work with her and to support her, and I think she's going to bring a new dimension to the work here." The move follows a series of appointments of women to high-profile positions in the Kingdom (see Women's political rights in Bahrain for further details).

During the Persian Gulf War in 1990–91, Bahrain was part of the coalition that fought to liberate Kuwait. Bahraini, RAF, and USAF pilots flew air strikes in Iraq from the Sheik Isa Air Base, while coalition navies operated out of Manama, the capital. Bahrain was hit by Scud missiles fired from Iraq. A number of Bahraini students studying in Iraq and Kuwait at the outbreak of hostilities went missing and are presumed the victims of Saddam Hussein's secret police.

After the liberation of Kuwait, Bahrain and the United States strengthened their already good ties by signing a ten-year agreement in October 1991, which granted American forces access to Bahraini facilities and allowed the U.S. to pre-position war material for future crises. In July 1995 the U.S. 5th Fleet was established in the Persian Gulf with its headquarters at NSA Bahrain in Manama. In 2003, U.S. President George W. Bush designated Bahrain as a major non-NATO ally.

Bahrain was an active member of the coalition that fought to remove the Taliban regime from Afghanistan in 2001; the Kingdom provided ships for the naval cordon in the Indian Ocean put in place to intercept fleeing Taliban and Al Qaeda fighters.

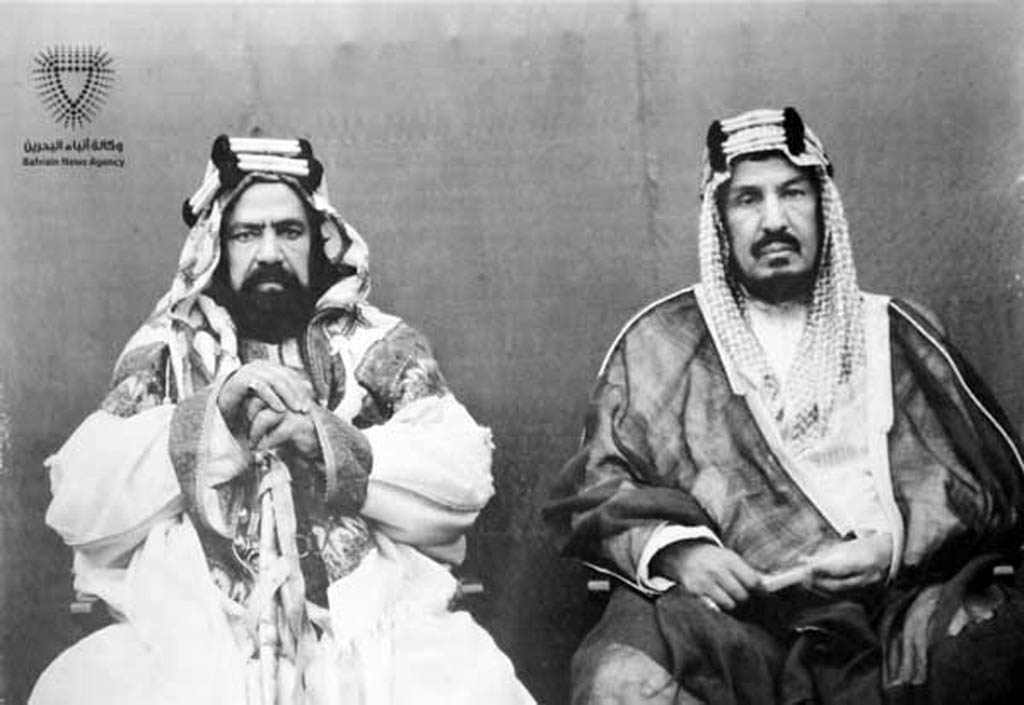
Salman bin Hamad Al Khalifa I with the Saudi king Ibn Saud.

However, the Kingdom opposed unilateral action against Iraq in 2003, and to the annoyance of Washington in the run up to the war sought to defuse the crisis by offering Saddam Hussein asylum as a way of avoiding war.

Bahrain-Iran relations have been strained since the Iranian Revolution and the 1981 discovery of a planned Iran-sponsored coup in Bahrain. Bahraini suspicions of the Iranian role in local unrest in the mid-1990s remain. However, with the decline of Iraq as a regional powerbroker, Bahrain has begun taking steps to improve relations with Iran and increase regional harmony. These efforts have included encouraging Bahrain-Iran trade.

The long-standing territorial dispute with Qatar over the Hawar Islands and the maritime boundary were resolved in 2001 by a compromise decision of the International Court of Justice (ICJ).

To mark Mahatma Gandhi's birthday on 2 October 2007, the Ministry of Foreign Affairs co-sponsored with the Bahrain Centre for Studies and Research and the Indian Embassy a conference on the relevance of Mahatma Gandhi’s philosophy for the Arab world in the 21st Century. The conference, attended by Arab and Indian academics, UN officials and diplomats discussed the Gandhi’s teaching of non-violence, austerity and spiritualism with particular reference to the Arab world today. Among the keynote speakers was leading liberal academic, Dr Abdulla Al Madani, who emphasised Gandhi’s moral vision: "Had he resorted to kidnapping, suicide-bombings, beheadings, or other barbarian means, his memory would not have remained rooted in the world's conscience. Believing that the credibility of one's action lay in setting a personal example, Gandhi began with himself. He quit his legal practice, gave up wearing Western-style clothing, and embraced a humble lifestyle by making his own clothes and living on a simple vegetarian diet. This, of course, differs from the practice of leaders of some Arab resistance movements, who urge their followers to boycott the West while savouring the Western lifestyle, products, and technology."

== Relations with Thailand and the Hakeem al-Araibi incident ==
Bahrain's foreign relations were put under strain and its human rights record under the spotlight when in November 2018 Bahraini footballer Hakeem al-Araibi, who had been sentenced in absentia by Bahrain to 10 years in prison for vandalising a police station in 2013, was arrested upon arrival in Thailand with his wife for their honeymoon. The footballer, who had been granted refugee status by Australia in 2014, urged the Thailand authorities not to deport him to Bahrain as he had been previously tortured in Bahrain for his political views.

He was kept in detention in Thailand while the Australian government and many international organisations and individuals lobbied for his release, until it was announced on 11 February 2019 by the Thai Office of the Attorney-General (OAG) that the extradition case against al-Araibi had been dropped by the criminal court at Bahrain's request. No reason was given by the foreign ministry, but the decision was made under Section 21 of the Prosecution Act, which allows for cases to be dropped if not in the public interest, and he would be released and allowed to return to Australia as soon as possible.

During the media frenzy surrounding the case, the strong links between Bahrain and Thailand were alluded to in the press. Academics and human rights groups raised the issue of the very close ties between the two countries, both financially and between the two royal families. According to Dr Aim Sinpeng, an expert in South-East Asian politics at the University of Sydney, the Thai and Bahraini royal families have always had a close relationship and the Bahraini royal family visits Thailand every year. Thai Deputy Prime Minister and Minister of Foreign Affairs Surapong Tovichakchaikul said in 2012 that the relationship between Thailand and Bahrain “was very close and strong” and also disclosed that the Bahrain Prime Minister was a “close personal friend” of former Thai prime minister Thaksin Shinawatra and had “donated roughly $2 million of his own money” to Thailand for flood relief.

The latest new business venture between the two countries is a new 6,700 sq. m. Thai shopping centre in Manama, set to launch in the first half of 2019 and described as an opportunity for Thai small and medium-sized enterprises to reach a huge potential market of Saudi shoppers, said to be the biggest economic centre in Bahrain, with import and exports between the two countries expected to be worth around US$400m annually.

== Diplomatic relations ==
List of countries which Bahrain maintains diplomatic relations with:

| # | Country | Date |
|---|---|---|
| 1 | Kuwait | 19 August 1971 |
| 2 | United Kingdom | 21 August 1971 |
| 3 | Saudi Arabia | 29 September 1971 |
| 4 | India | 12 October 1971 |
| 5 | Pakistan | 14 October 1971 |
| 6 | United States | 14 October 1971 |
| 7 | Qatar | 1971 |
| 8 | United Arab Emirates | 1971 |
| 9 | Iraq | 18 January 1972 |
| 10 | France | 15 February 1972 |
| 11 | Australia | 24 April 1972 |
| 12 | Japan | 2 May 1972 |
| 13 | Netherlands | 2 May 1972 |
| 14 | Yemen | 13 May 1972 |
| 15 | Germany | 17 May 1972 |
| 16 | Lebanon | 29 May 1972 |
| 17 | Afghanistan | 1 June 1972 |
| 18 | Egypt | 5 June 1972 |
| 19 | Jordan | 10 June 1972 |
| 20 | Tunisia | 25 June 1972 |
| 21 | Somalia | 29 October 1972 |
| 22 | Spain | 15 November 1972 |
| 23 | Sudan | 4 December 1972 |
| — | Iran (severed) | 9 December 1972 |
| 24 | Chad | 10 December 1972 |
| 25 | Canada | 2 February 1973 |
| 26 | Morocco | 5 March 1973 |
| 27 | Turkey | 12 April 1973 |
| 28 | Mauritania | 30 April 1973 |
| 29 | Norway | 15 July 1973 |
| 30 | Greece | 28 August 1973 |
| 31 | Switzerland | 12 September 1973 |
| 32 | Italy | 16 December 1973 |
| 33 | Guinea | 5 January 1974 |
| 34 | Sweden | 25 February 1974 |
| 35 | Argentina | 18 March 1974 |
| 36 | Ireland | 18 May 1974 |
| 37 | Bangladesh | 6 June 1974 |
| 38 | Denmark | 10 August 1974 |
| 39 | Malta | 4 November 1974 |
| 40 | Niger | 11 November 1974 |
| 41 | Malaysia | 25 November 1974 |
| 42 | Finland | 23 January 1975 |
| 43 | Syria | 23 January 1975 |
| 44 | Libya | 22 February 1975 |
| 45 | Cameroon | 20 March 1975 |
| 46 | Austria | 18 May 1975 |
| 47 | Mexico | 5 August 1975 |
| 48 | Gabon | 8 November 1975 |
| 49 | Mauritius | 12 February 1976 |
| 50 | Brazil | 23 February 1976 |
| 51 | South Korea | 17 April 1976 |
| 52 | Portugal | 10 July 1976 |
| 53 | Lesotho | 24 July 1976 |
| 54 | Nepal | 13 January 1977 |
| 55 | Thailand | 15 January 1977 |
| 56 | Venezuela | 31 May 1977 |
| 57 | Mali | 6 June 1977 |
| 58 | Burundi | 27 June 1977 |
| 59 | Ghana | 9 April 1978 |
| 60 | Iceland | 24 May 1978 |
| 61 | Philippines | 27 November 1978 |
| 62 | Tanzania | 1978 |
| 63 | Oman | 13 June 1979 |
| 64 | Luxembourg | 14 March 1980 |
| 65 | Maldives | 24 March 1980 |
| 66 | Democratic Republic of the Congo | 3 June 1980 |
| 67 | Belgium | 2 December 1980 |
| 68 | Senegal | 13 December 1981 |
| 69 | Cyprus | 14 January 1982 |
| 70 | Zambia | 24 January 1983 |
| 71 | Chile | 6 February 1983 |
| 72 | Djibouti | 6 February 1983 |
| 73 | Gambia | 6 February 1983 |
| 74 | Seychelles | 4 May 1983 |
| 75 | Algeria | 19 November 1983 |
| 76 | Indonesia | 23 July 1984 |
| 77 | New Zealand | 23 July 1984 |
| 78 | Comoros | 1984 |
| 79 | Singapore | 30 June 1985 |
| 80 | Haiti | 15 September 1985 |
| 81 | Brunei | 24 September 1988 |
| — | State of Palestine | 3 January 1989 |
| 82 | Burkina Faso | 25 February 1989 |
| 83 | China | 18 April 1989 |
| 84 | Colombia | 18 April 1989 |
| 85 | Panama | 27 April 1989 |
| 86 | Serbia | 31 August 1989 |
| 87 | Hungary | 3 March 1990 |
| 88 | Russia | 29 September 1990 |
| 89 | Romania | 10 March 1991 |
| 90 | Poland | 22 April 1991 |
| 91 | Nicaragua | 12 August 1991 |
| 92 | Bulgaria | 15 October 1991 |
| 93 | Bhutan | 6 January 1992 |
| 94 | Bosnia and Herzegovina | 3 May 1992 |
| 95 | Kazakhstan | 28 May 1992 |
| 96 | Uzbekistan | 28 May 1992 |
| 97 | Sri Lanka | 27 June 1992 |
| 98 | Ukraine | 20 July 1992 |
| 99 | Croatia | 18 January 1993 |
| 100 | Albania | 10 May 1993 |
| 101 | Georgia | 10 May 1993 |
| 102 | Czech Republic | 14 June 1993 |
| 103 | South Africa | 13 September 1993 |
| 104 | Uganda | 2 October 1993 |
| 105 | Cuba | 15 June 1994 |
| 106 | Slovakia | 22 March 1995 |
| 107 | Vietnam | 31 March 1995 |
| 108 | Tajikistan | 20 May 1995 |
| 109 | Uruguay | 25 May 1995 |
| 110 | Ivory Coast | 17 June 1995 |
| 111 | Lithuania | 3 July 1995 |
| 112 | Eritrea | 2 December 1995 |
| 113 | Turkmenistan | 15 December 1995 |
| 114 | Kyrgyzstan | 9 February 1996 |
| 115 | Slovenia | 28 February 1996 |
| 116 | Zimbabwe | 27 June 1996 |
| 117 | Belarus | 1 July 1996 |
| 118 | North Macedonia | 11 September 1996 |
| 119 | Armenia | 15 October 1996 |
| 120 | Azerbaijan | 6 November 1996 |
| 121 | São Tomé and Príncipe | 27 October 1997 |
| 122 | Mozambique | 3 November 1997 |
| 123 | Guyana | 19 November 1997 |
| 124 | Rwanda | 2 March 1998 |
| 125 | Mongolia | 16 May 1998 |
| 126 | Malawi | 9 June 1998 |
| 127 | Republic of the Congo | 9 June 1999 |
| 128 | El Salvador | 16 June 1999 |
| 129 | Suriname | 10 November 1999 |
| 130 | Ethiopia | 28 November 1999 |
| — | Holy See | 12 January 2000 |
| 131 | Latvia | 27 March 2000 |
| 132 | Ecuador | 26 June 2000 |
| 133 | Honduras | 27 June 2000 |
| 134 | North Korea | 23 May 2001 |
| 135 | Laos | 15 December 2002 |
| 136 | Moldova | 7 April 2004 |
| 137 | Estonia | 27 April 2004 |
| 138 | Cape Verde | 17 March 2005 |
| 139 | Liechtenstein | 1 April 2005 |
| 140 | Paraguay | 6 May 2005 |
| 141 | Eswatini | 9 September 2005 |
| 142 | Belize | 14 December 2005 |
| 143 | Costa Rica | 22 September 2006 |
| 144 | Antigua and Barbuda | 20 October 2006 |
| 145 | Andorra | 4 May 2007 |
| 146 | Guatemala | 21 May 2007 |
| 147 | Dominican Republic | 22 October 2007 |
| 148 | Barbados | 12 March 2008 |
| 149 | Cambodia | 29 June 2009 |
| 150 | Peru | 22 September 2009 |
| 151 | Montenegro | 25 September 2009 |
| 152 | Myanmar | 10 November 2009 |
| 153 | Bahamas | 25 September 2010 |
| 154 | Fiji | 25 September 2010 |
| 155 | Kenya | 25 September 2010 |
| 156 | Saint Vincent and the Grenadines | 28 September 2012 |
| 157 | South Sudan | 28 September 2012 |
| 158 | Monaco | 23 September 2013 |
| 159 | Angola | 26 September 2013 |
| — | Kosovo | 12 March 2014 |
| 160 | Kiribati | 25 September 2018 |
| 161 | Saint Kitts and Nevis | 27 September 2018 |
| 162 | Jamaica | 28 September 2018 |
| 163 | Palau | 28 September 2018 |
| 164 | San Marino | 25 September 2019 |
| 165 | Timor-Leste | 27 September 2019 |
| 166 | Israel | 18 October 2020 |
| 167 | Central African Republic | 24 March 2022 |
| 168 | Sierra Leone | 8 June 2022 |
| 169 | Tonga | 19 September 2022 |
| 170 | Federated States of Micronesia | 21 September 2022 |
| 171 | Solomon Islands | 21 September 2022 |
| 172 | Togo | 21 September 2022 |
| 173 | Trinidad and Tobago | 21 September 2022 |
| 174 | Dominica | 23 September 2022 |
| 175 | Madagascar | 23 September 2022 |
| 176 | Saint Lucia | 13 December 2022 |
| 177 | Samoa | 27 April 2023 |
| 178 | Nauru | 4 May 2023 |
| 179 | Papua New Guinea | 1 June 2023 |
| 180 | Grenada | 19 September 2023 |
| 181 | Benin | 21 September 2023 |
| 182 | Bolivia | 22 September 2023 |
| 183 | Vanuatu | 9 February 2024 |
| 184 | Equatorial Guinea | 24 September 2024 |
| 185 | Liberia | 26 September 2024 |
| 186 | Namibia | 26 September 2024 |
| 187 | Nigeria | 9 February 2025 |
| 188 | Botswana | 25 June 2026 |
| 189 | Marshall Islands | 24 September 2026 |

== Bilateral relations ==
| Country | Formal Relations Began | Notes |
|---|---|---|
| India | | See Bahrain–India relations India is a close ally of Bahrain, the Kingdom along with its GCC partners are (according to Indian officials) among the most prominent backers of India's bid for a permanent seat on the UN Security Council, and Bahraini officials have urged India to play a greater role in international affairs. For instance, over concerns about Iran's nuclear programme Bahrain's Crown Prince appealed to India to play an active role in resolving the crisis Ties between India and Bahrain go back generations, with many of Bahrain's most prominent figures having close connections: poet and constitutionalist Ebrahim Al-Arrayedh grew up in Mumbai, while 17th century Bahraini theologians Sheikh Salih Al-Karzakani and Sheikh Ja`far bin Kamal al-Din were influential figures in the Kingdom of Golkonda and the development of Shia thought in the sub-continent. Bahraini politicians have sought to enhance these long standing ties, with Parliamentary Speaker Khalifa Al Dhahrani in 2007 leading a delegation of parliamentarians and business leaders to meet Indian President Pratibha Patil, opposition leader L K Advani, and take part in training and media interviews. Politically, it is easier for Bahrain's politicians to seek training and advice from India than it is from the United States or other western alternative. In December 2007, the Bahrain India Society was launched in Manama to promote ties between the two countries. Headed by the former Minister of Labour Abdulnabi Al Shoala, the Society seeks to take advantage of the development in civil society to actively work to strengthen ties between the two countries, not only business links, but according to the body's opening statement in politics, social affairs, science and culture. India's Minister of State for Foreign Affairs E Ahmed and his Bahraini counterpart Dr Nazar Al Baharna attended the launch. Bahrain's ruler Sheikh Hamad Bin Isa Al-Khalifa went on a state visit to India in February 2014 and has secured $450 million of bilateral trade and investment between the two nations. |
| Iran | | See Bahrain–Iran relations On 12 August 2012, Foreign Minister Sheikh Khalid al-Khalifa announced that Bahrain has reinstated its Ambassador to Iran. On 19 July 2015, after Supreme Leader Ali Khamenei voiced support for the oppressed people across the Middle East including Bahrain, the Iranian acting chargé d'affaires Morteza Sanubari was summoned by the Bahraini Foreign Ministry over "flagrant interference". The foreign ministry handed "an official protest memorandum" to the diplomat over "statements made by Ali Khamenei against the kingdom of Bahrain". On 1 October 2015 (a week after the 2015 Mina stampede), the Bahraini government recalled its ambassador from Tehran and ordered the Iranian acting chargé d'affaires to leave the country within 3 days in response to "continuing interference by Iran in the affairs of the kingdom". This comes when Bahraini authorities in Nuwaidrat (30 September) discovered a large bomb-making factory and seized a large stash of weapons and arrested a number of people suspected of having links with Iran's Revolutionary Guards. Bahrain's decision to recall its ambassador comes "in light of continued Iranian meddling in the affairs of the kingdom of Bahrain ... in order to create sectarian strife and to impose hegemony and control. In response (on 2 October), the Iranian Foreign Ministry retaliated by releasing this statement: "The number two official in Bahrain's embassy in Tehran is persona non grata and Mr. Bassam al-Dossari must leave Iran's territory within 72 hours," the official IRNA news agency quoted a foreign ministry statement as saying late Friday. On 4 January 2016, Bahrain severed diplomatic ties with Iran, accusing it of interference in Saudi internal affairs after Saudi Arabia executed prominent Shia cleric, Nimr al-Nimr for his involvement in 2011–12 Saudi Arabian protests. This followed the same decision by the Saudi government, after Iranian protesters set fires in the Saudi Embassy in Tehran. |
| Iraq | | See Bahrain–Iraq relations: Bahrain has an embassy in Baghdad.; Iraq has an embassy in Manama. |
| Israel | | See Bahrain–Israel relations Until September 11, 2020, there were no official relations between Bahrain and Israel and the government of Bahrain didn't recognize Israel as a state. However, Israeli citizens were allowed to enter Bahrain with the requirement of a visa. Unofficial relations began in late 2016 due to tensions with Iran and denounced the Arab League boycott of Israel. On September 11, 2020, Bahrain and Israel signed a normalization agreement thereby agreeing to recognize each other and establish diplomatic relations. On November 2, 2023, Bahrain recalled its ambassador to Israel and froze economic ties with them. |
| Kazakhstan | | Bahrain's first ever royal visit to Kazakhstan was in April 2014, where the King met with the Kazakh president Nursultan Nazarbayev. The country have signed major deals between the two countries to bolster trade and investments. Bahrain have expressed its support for the Astana Expo 2017 and have encouraged local businessmen and government sectors to take part in the prestigious event. The Kazakh Government has created the Bahraini-Kazakh Business Council, unveiling plans to sign an agreement on encouraging and protecting investment, avoiding taxation and fiscal evasion. |
| Kosovo | 13 March 2014 | On 19 May 2009, Bahrain officially recognised Kosovo as an independent state. On 13 March 2014, Bahrain and Kosovo established diplomatic relations. |
| Kuwait | | See Bahrain–Kuwait relations: Bahrain has an embassy in Kuwait City.; Kuwait has an embassy in Manama. |
| Malaysia | | See Bahrain–Malaysia relations: Bahrain has an embassy in Kuala Lumpur.; Malaysia has an embassy in Manama. |
| Pakistan | | See Bahrain-Pakistan relations April 17, 2008: Arabian Shark '08 in process, a joint exercise between the navies of Pakistan, Bahrain and the United States, focusing on antisubmarine warfare. Bahrain and Pakistan enjoy cordial and deep ties. Crown Prince Salman bin Hamad bin Isa Al Khalifa, during a visit to Pakistan, called Pakistan his second home and stated that Bahrain regards Pakistan extremely highly. Joint initiatives between Pakistani and Bahraini governments have started to further their bilateral trades, which reached to $250 million in 2007. Pakistani businessmen are eyeing on Bahrain's property market while Bahrain is seeing Pakistan as a good agricultural potential investment country. |
| Portugal | | See Bahrain–Portugal relations: The Embassy of Bahrain in Rabat, Morocco, is accredited to Portugal for diplomatic and consular representation.; Portugal's diplomatic representation to Bahrain is maintained through its embassy in Riyadh, Saudi Arabia. |
| Qatar | | See Bahrain–Qatar relations Bahrain has an embassy in Qatar. Qatar also has an embassy in Bahrain. In May 2017, Bahrain cut diplomatic ties with Qatar, and closed its airspace and maritime to Qatar transportations. It has also asked Qataris to leave the country, and Bahrainis to leave to Qatar. Islam Hassan argues that " the small Kingdom has been toeing the Saudi foreign policy for the past couple of years. It seems that their severing of ties with Qatar was mainly an answer to a Saudi call." In April 2023, Bahrain had restored diplomatic ties with Qatar. |
| Russia | | See Bahrain–Russia relations: Bahrain has an embassy in Moscow.; Russia has an embassy in Manama. |
| Saudi Arabia | | See Bahrain–Saudi Arabia relations: Bahrain has an embassy in Riyadh and a consulate-general in Jeddah.; Saudi Arabia has an embassy in Manama. |
| South Korea | | On 24 June 2014, the South Korean deputy minister for multilateral and global affairs, Shin Dong-ik, met with ambassador Abdulla Abdullatif Abdullah, the undersecretary of the Ministry of Foreign Affairs of Bahrain who was on a visit to the Republic of Korea from June 22 through 24. During the meeting, the two sides exchanged ideas on ways to promote the ROK-Bahrain relations and discussed ways to work together in the field of human rights. Dong-ik and Abdullah shared the view that continued high-level exchanges are essential for the improvement of relations between the South Korea and Bahrain. |
| Syria | | See Bahrain–Syria relations |
| Turkey | 4 December 1973 | See Bahrain–Turkey relations Relations between Bahrain and Turkey were officially established on December 4, 1973. The relation between these two countries are considered positive, with trade at 78.1 million U.S. dollars in 2006. Almost double then the amount then it was 2003. In 2007, trade was at 186 million U.S. dollars.: Bahrain has an embassy in Ankara.; Turkey has an embassy in Manama. |
| United Arab Emirates | | See Bahrain–United Arab Emirates relations: Bahrain has an embassy in Abu Dhabi.; United Arab Emirates has an embassy in Manama.; Bahrain's Prince Nasser bin Hamad Al Khalifa married Dubai's Shaikha bint Mohammed bin Rashed Al Maktoum, a daughter of the Emir of Dubai, Mohammed bin Rashid Al Maktoum, on 28 September 2009. |
| United Kingdom | 21 August 1971 | See Bahrain–United Kingdom relations Bahrain established diplomatic relations with the United Kingdom on 21 August 1971.: Bahrain maintains an embassy in London.; The United Kingdom is accredited to Bahrain through its embassy in Manama.; Both countries share common membership of the World Trade Organization, as well as the Bahrain–US Comprehensive Security Integration and Prosperity Agreement. Bilaterally the two countries have a Double Taxation Agreement. Both countries are negotiating a Free Trade Agreement. |
| United States | | See Bahrain–United States relations: Bahrain has an embassy in Washington, D.C.; United States has an embassy in Manama. |

== See also ==
- Ministry of Foreign Affairs
- List of diplomatic missions in Bahrain
- List of diplomatic missions of Bahrain
- Territorial disputes in the Persian Gulf
- Bahrain–European Union relations
