= Bahrain–Syria relations =

Bilateral relations

Bahrain–Syria relations العلاقات البحرينية–السورية

- Bahrain: Syria

Diplomatic mission
- Bahraini Embassy, Damascus: Syrian Embassy, Manama (Note: Until 2023, together with the Syrian embassy in Abu Dhabi, the Syrian Embassy in Manama was also responsible for Syrian interests in Saudi Arabia)

Envoy
- Waheed Mubarak Sayyar: Mohammed Ali Ibrahim

Bahrain–Syria relations were established on 23 January 1975. Bahrain has an embassy in Damascus and Syria has an embassy in Manama. The two Arab nations share historical, cultural, and regional ties rooted in their membership in the Arab League and the Organisation of Islamic Cooperation.

While Bahrain and Syria have experienced periods of cooperation and shared interests, their relations have also faced challenges, particularly in the context of regional conflicts and political crises.

== History ==
Bahrain and Syria established formal diplomatic relations on 23 January 1975, shortly after Bahrain gained independence from the United Kingdom in 1971. The two countries initially enjoyed cordial relations, driven by shared goals within Arab regional organizations and a mutual interest in supporting the Palestinian cause and maintaining stability in the Arab world.

=== Cooperation and diplomacy (1980–2011) ===
Throughout the 1980s and 1990s, Bahrain and Syria generally maintained a stable diplomatic relationship, with high-level visits and exchanges of representatives that signaled mutual cooperation. During these decades, both countries advocated for greater Arab unity and were generally supportive of regional initiatives within the Arab League, such as economic cooperation agreements and collective security arrangements.

Bahrain and Syria cooperated on a number of political issues, including their mutual opposition to the 1978 Camp David Accords between Egypt and Israel, which they viewed as a potential threat to pan-Arab unity. Their cooperation also extended to support for Lebanon, as both countries participated in diplomatic efforts to resolve the Lebanese Civil War.

=== Relations amid the Syrian Civil War (2011–2018) ===
The onset of the Syrian civil war in 2011 marked a major turning point in Bahrain–Syria relations. Bahrain was among the Gulf Cooperation Council countries that initially condemned the Syrian government’s response to the protests and expressed support for the opposition groups challenging President Bashar al-Assad's rule. In 2012, Bahrain closed its embassy in Damascus as part of a broader regional response from the GCC, which sought to isolate the Syrian government diplomatically.

Despite the suspension of direct diplomatic relations, Bahrain maintained a more restrained approach to the Syrian conflict compared to some other GCC countries, such as Saudi Arabia and Qatar, which were actively involved in supporting anti-Assad forces. Bahrain refrained from substantial involvement in military or financial support for the Syrian opposition, although it remained aligned with GCC positions on the issue.

=== Re-establishment of relations (2018–2024) ===
In recent years, Bahrain has moved to re-establish diplomatic ties with Syria as part of a wider trend among Arab nations seeking to reintegrate Syria into regional institutions. In 2018, Bahrain announced the reopening of its embassy in Damascus, becoming one of the first GCC countries to restore its diplomatic mission in Syria. This decision aligned with a broader shift in regional attitudes toward Syria, as several Arab countries expressed a willingness to normalize relations with the Syrian government, viewing it as a potential means to stabilize the region and counterbalance other influences in the Middle East, such as those from Iran and Turkey.

Bahrain’s efforts to normalize relations with Syria also reflected broader strategic interests, particularly its desire to maintain a cohesive stance within the Arab League and to reduce regional tensions. This normalization process has continued gradually, with discussions of trade, security cooperation, and regional stability being central to the renewed diplomatic engagement between the two countries.

On 19 June 2022, Syrian President Bashar al-Assad received the credentials of Ambassador Waheed Mubarak Sayyar in an official ceremony attended by Syrian Foreign Minister Faisal Mekdad.

In 2024, Syrian President Bashar al-Assad met with Bahrain's Foreign Minister Abdullatif bin Rashid Al Zayani in Damascus in the first visit by a Bahraini foreign minister to Syria in 13 years. At the 33rd Arab Summit in May 2024, President al-Assad met with King Hamad bin Isa Al Khalifa for the first time in 13 years.

=== Post-Assad regime relations ===
On 13 December 2024, King Hamad bin Isa Al Khalifa expressed Bahrain's readiness for collaboration and continued consultations with Syria's new administration following the fall of the Assad regime. Later that month, on 28 December, a Bahraini delegation led by Strategic Security Bureau chief, Ahmed bin Abdulaziz Al Khalifa, visited Damascus to meet with Ahmed al-Sharaa, leader of Hay'at Tahrir al-Sham, marking Bahrain's intent to reestablish ties and support the Syrian transitional government.

== Economic relations ==
Economic exchanges between Bahrain and Syria have historically been limited due to the size of their respective economies and differing priorities within the Middle East. Before the Syrian civil war, trade between the two countries was modest, and there were few significant investments or economic agreements. However, both nations occasionally engaged in joint economic forums and initiatives under the umbrella of the Arab League to promote inter-Arab trade and investment.

Since the re-establishment of diplomatic relations in 2018, Bahrain and Syria have expressed interest in strengthening economic ties, although concrete progress has been limited.

== Diplomatic missions ==
- Bahrain currently maintains an embassy in Damascus, which it reopened in December 2018.
- Syria has an embassy in Manama.

== See also ==
- Foreign relations of Bahrain
- Foreign relations of Syria
- Arab League
