= List of ambassadors of Turkey to Bahrain =

The list of ambassadors of Turkey to Bahrain provides a chronological record of individuals who have served as the diplomatic representatives of the Republic of Turkey to the Kingdom of Bahrain.

== List of ambassadors ==
Ambassador	Term start	Term end	Ref.
Yavuz Aktaş	26 June 1987	16 September 1988	
Erkut Onart	30 September 1988	15 September 1990	
Günaltay Şibay	19 December 1990	18 June 1993	
Aydemir Erman	30 June 1993	17 February 1998	
Engin Türker	27 February 1998	22 May 2001	
Hilal Başkal	1 June 2001	20 December 2005	
Haldun Otman	30 December 2005	15 July 2010	
Ahmet Ülker	1 August 2010	1 November 2013	
Hatun Demirer	6 November 2013	15 December 2017	
Kemal Demirciler	1 January 2018	1 March 2021	
Esin Çakıl	15 March 2021	Present	

== See also ==
- Bahrain–Turkey relations
- Embassy of Turkey in Manama
