= List of ambassadors of Turkey to OSCE =

The list of ambassadors of Turkey to the OSCE comprises diplomats responsible for representing Turkey's interests within the Organization for Security and Co-operation in Europe (OSCE). Turkey has been an active member of the OSCE since its inception.

== List of ambassadors ==
#	Ambassador	Term start	Term end	Ref.
1	Ali Hikmet Alp	1 January 1989	1 January 1996	
2	Yalım Eralp	1 January 1996	1 January 2000	
3	Ömür Orhun	1 January 2000	1 January 2004	
4	Yusuf Buluç	1 January 2004	1 January 2009	
5	Mustafa Naci Sarıbaş	1 January 2009	15 June 2011	
6	Tacan İldem	15 June 2011	18 February 2016	
7	Rauf Engin Soysal	31 October 2016	28 February 2021	
8	Hatun Demirer	8 March 2021	Present	

== See also ==
- Organization for Security and Co-operation in Europe
- Ministry of Foreign Affairs
- List of diplomatic missions of Turkey
