= Bahrain–Yemen relations =

- Bahrain: Yemen

Bilateral relations exist between the Kingdom of Bahrain of and the Republic of Yemen. Both Bahrain and Yemen were part of the Persian Empire, and later the Umayyad and Abbasid caliphates. Yemen has an embassy in Manama. Bahrain has an embassy in Sana'a.

== History ==
Extended to the field of health through the signing of a memorandum of understanding on health cooperation in November 1999 and then spread to the side of the cultural and media under the signature of the Convention on Media Exchange in September 2002 and the other took place in October for cooperation in the field of technical and vocational education, and we can say that the relations bilateral between Yemen and Bahrain is still characterized by generalized Although originality and authenticity there is still a lot in front of the two countries to activate their relations in various areas.

=== Economic cooperation ===
Limited relationship to the limited cooperation in the field of trade in 1979 and spread to the political sphere after the establishment of the Yemeni unity - specifically in 1994 - and became its significance realism since 1997 and have become a trade more sophisticated establishment of a joint bank between the two countries and the establishment of a company to market and to support the Yemeni exports and the signing of the convention on the tax-exempt mutual in November 1998.

=== 2024 Missile attacks ===
In the 2024, Bahrain, the US and other Western countries took part in the 2024 missile strikes in Yemen.

== See also ==
- Foreign relations of Bahrain
- Foreign relations of Yemen
