= Saudi-Bahraini Coordination Council =

Diplomatic relations between Saudi Arabia and Bahrain

The Saudi-Bahraini Coordination Council (Arabic: مجلس التنسيق السعودي البحريني) is a coordination council that oversees all areas of cooperation between the Kingdom of Saudi Arabia and the Kingdom of Bahrain. It was established on July 28, 2019, during talks held between the Saudi Foreign Minister Adel al-Jubeir and his Bahraini counterpart Khalid bin Ahmed Al Khalifa. The council represents a number of committees developing political, economic, military, media, and social ties between the two countries.
