= Bahrain–Iraq relations =

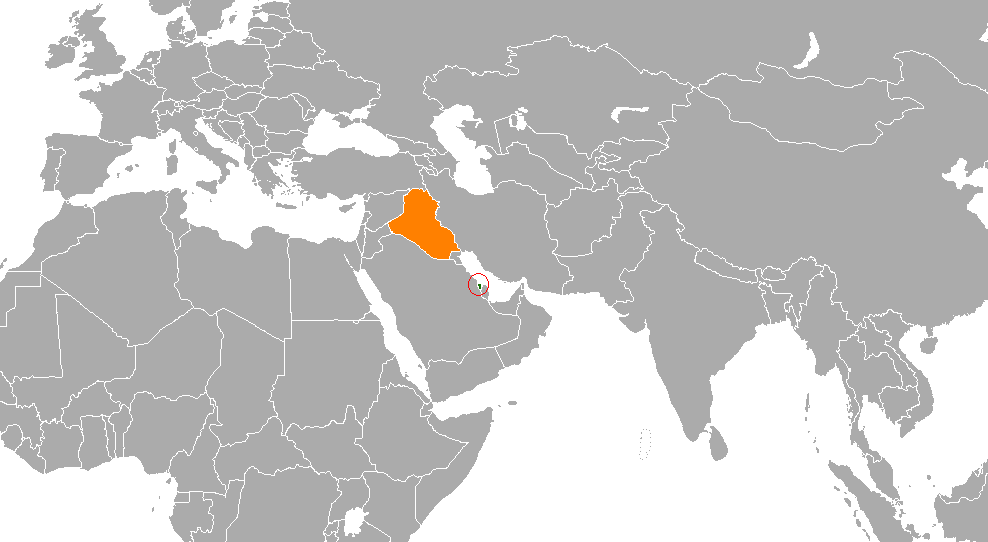

- Bahrain: Iraq

Historic and current bilateral relationship exist between Bahrain and Iraq. In recent years relations between the two have been mixed, with the Bahraini government criticizing what it sees as Iraq's interference in its internal affairs, especially since the 2011 uprising. Both countries are part of the Organization for Islamic Cooperation.

In recent years, both countries have moved to establish a stronger relationship in fear of growing Iranian interference.

The current ambassador of the Kingdom of Bahrain in Iraq is Salah Al Maliki, while the current ambassador of the Republic of Iraq in Bahrain is Ahmed Nayef Rasheed Al-Dulaimi. Bahrain maintains an embassy in Baghdad and a consulate general in Najaf, while Iraq is represented through its embassy in Manama.

== See also ==
- Foreign relations of Bahrain
- Foreign relations of Iraq
