= Bahrain–United Arab Emirates relations =

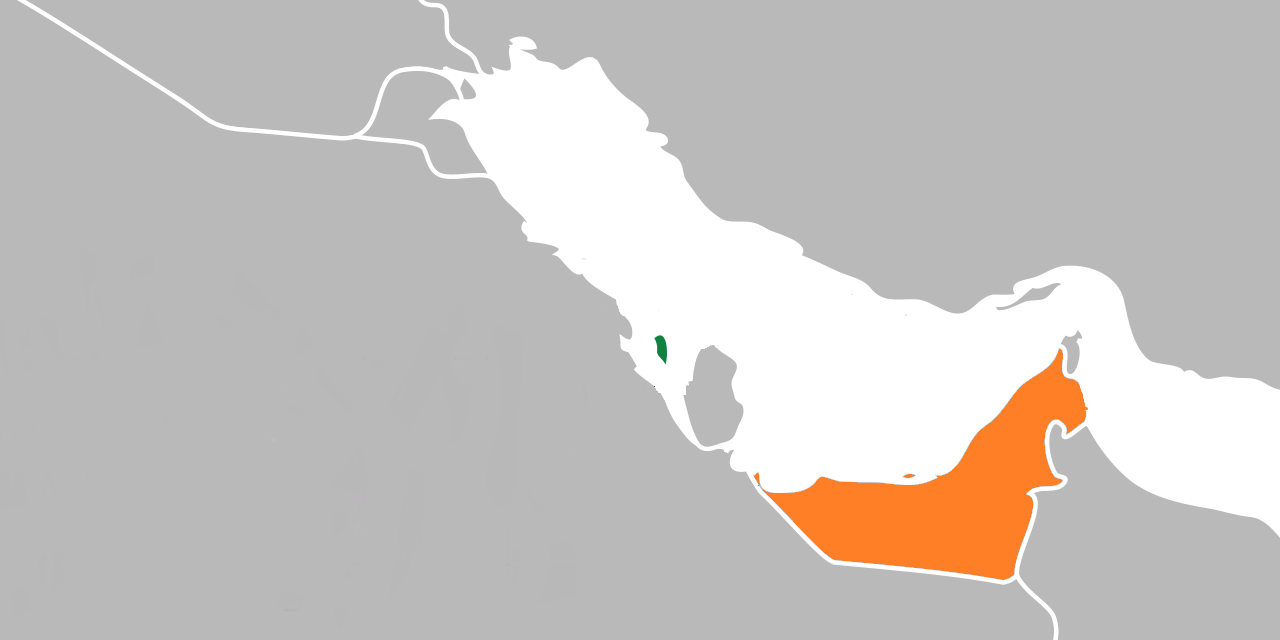

- Bahrain: United Arab Emirates

Diplomatic mission
- Embassy of Bahrain, Abu Dhabi: Embassy of the United Arab Emirates, Manama

Relations exist between the United Arab Emirates and Bahrain. Relations between the two countries are close and friendly, with the U.A.E. having an embassy in Manama while Bahrain maintains its embassy in Abu Dhabi. Both states are geographically a part of the Persian Gulf and lie in close proximity to one another; both are also members of the Gulf Cooperation Council (GCC).

== History ==
Both countries share a common history, having both been British protectorates since the 19th century. After the announcement of British withdrawing from east of Suez, the seven emirates that currently make up the UAE, Qatar and Bahrain engaged in negotiations to form an independent political union known as the Federation of Arab Emirates. However, administrative disagreements led to Bahrain pulling out of negotiations and declaring independence in August 1971, with the UAE following later that year. Both countries joined the GCC in 1981 and have had close diplomatic and commercial relations since.

Bahrain and the UAE had signed peace agreements with Israel over the course of late 2020 known as Abraham Accords in order to counter Iranian aggression in the region.

== Resident diplomatic missions ==
- Bahrain has an embassy in Abu Dhabi and a consulate-general in Dubai.
- the United Arab Emirates has an embassy in Manama.

== See also ==
- Foreign relations of Bahrain
- Foreign relations of the United Arab Emirates
