= Esin Çakıl =

Turkish diplomat

Turkish Ambassador to Bahrain
- In office March 15, 2021 – November 27, 2024

Personal details
- Born: 1972 (age 53–54) Ankara, Turkey
- Children: 1
- Education: Middle East Technical University

Esin Çakıl is a Turkish diplomat who served as the ambassador of Turkey to Bahrain from March 15, 2021 until November 27, 2024.

== Education ==
Raised in Ankara, Çakıl was a 1991 graduate of Tevfik Fikret High School. She earned her Bachelor of Arts degree from the Middle East Technical University.

== Career ==
Ambassador Çakıl began her diplomatic career in the NATO Department at the Foreign Ministry. She was posted as attaché in Dakar from 1999 to 2000. She then served as a third and then second secretary in Beirut between 2000 and 2004.

She served in the Department of Energy at the Foreign Ministry from 2004 to 2006. She then served as first secretary in The Hague from 2006 to 2009. Afterwards, she was posted as second and then first secretary in the Turkish Republic of Northern Cyprus from 2009 to 2011.

From 2011 to 2018, Çakıl served as the Head of Consular Affairs Department at the Foreign Ministry and later continued her role as Deputy Director General of the Ministry tasked with consular affairs from 2018 until 2021.

Çakıl was ambassador to Bahrain from March 15, 2021 until November 27, 2024.

== Personal life ==
Ambassador Çakıl is married and has one child. She is fluent in English and French.

== See also ==
- List of ambassadors of Turkey to Bahrain
