= Bahrain–Russia relations =

- Bahrain: Russia

Bilateral relations exist between Bahrain and Russia.

== Soviet-era relations ==
The Soviet Union established diplomatic relations with Bahrain on 29 September 1990.

== Russian Federation relations ==
Bahrain recognised the Russian Federation as the successor state of the Soviet Union on 28 December 1991, after the latter's dissolution. Russia has an embassy in Manama, and Bahrain has an embassy in Moscow.

== Economic ties ==
In May 2007, the two countries announced that they will jointly set up a new financial institution known as the "Arab-Russian Bank" and will have its main headquarters in Bahrain.

== State visits ==
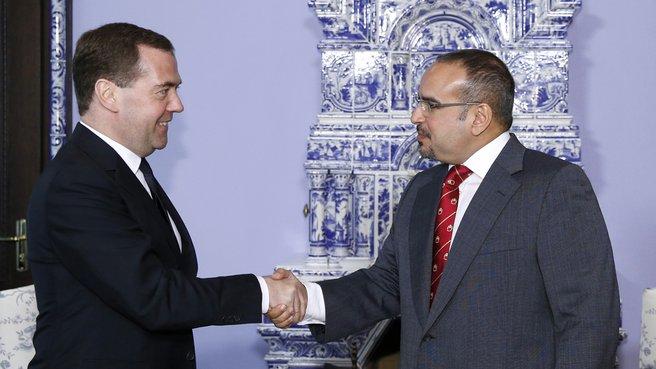
Russian prime minister Dmitry Medvedev meets with the Bahraini Crown Prince Salman bin Hamad bin Isa Al Khalifa on 29 April 2014.

In 2008, King of Bahrain Hamad ibn Isa Al Khalifah visited Moscow and met with the Russian president Dmitry Medvedev.

In late 2015, King Hamad bin Isa Al Khalifa visited President Vladimir Putin. He presented the Russian president with a sword of Damascus steel, while Putin gifted him a stallion. They also stated their commitment to finding a solution for the Syrian crisis and for having a stable Syria.

In December 2017 a Russian parliamentary delegation visited the kingdom and spoke to their Bahraini counterparts, affirming their commitment to increasing ties between the two countries on all levels.

== See also ==
- Foreign relations of Bahrain
- Foreign relations of Russia
- List of ambassadors of Russia to Bahrain
