= List of foreign ministry headquarters =

This is a list of foreign ministry headquarters. It lists the names and locations of buildings that serve as the headquarters for foreign ministries.

| Country | Ministry name | Building name | Year of opening | Street | District | City, country subdivision | Image |
|---|---|---|---|---|---|---|---|
| Argentina | Ministry of Foreign Affairs, International Trade and Worship | San Martín Palace | 1936 | 761 Arenales | Retiro | Buenos Aires | |
| Australia | Department of Foreign Affairs and Trade | R.G. Casey Building | 1996 | John McEwen Crescent | Barton, South Canberra | Canberra, ACT | |
| Austria | Federal Ministry for European and International Affairs | Ministry of Foreign Affairs building | 1959 | Minoritenplatz 8 | Innere Stadt | Vienna | |
| Bahrain | Ministry of Foreign Affairs | | | Government Ave. | | Manama, Northern Governorate | |
| Belarus | Ministry of Foreign Affairs | Ministry of Foreign Affairs building | 1979 | Lenin street, 19 | Leninsky District | Minsk | |
| Belgium | Federal Public Service Foreign Affairs | Egmont Palace | 1964 | Square du Petit Sablon/Kleine Zavelsquare 8 | | Brussels | |
| Bosnia and Herzegovina | Ministry of Foreign Affairs | Railways Building | 1896 | Musala 2 | Centar | Sarajevo | |
| Brazil | Ministry of External Relations | Itamaraty Palace | 1970 | Monumental Axis | | Brasília, DF | |
| Bulgaria | Ministry of Foreign Affairs | Ministry of Foreign Affairs building | 1947 | Alexander Zhendov street 2 | | Sofia | |
| Cambodia | Ministry of Foreign Affairs and International Cooperation | Ministry of Foreign Affairs Building | 2013 | No. 3, Samdech Hun Sen Street | Sangkat Tonle Bassac, Khan Chamkarmon | Phnom Penh | |
| Canada | Department of Foreign Affairs and International Trade | Lester B. Pearson Building | 1973 | 125 Sussex Drive | Lower Town | Ottawa, Ontario | |
| Chile | Ministry of Foreign Affairs | Edificio José Miguel Carrera | 2005 | Teatinos 180 | | Santiago | |
| People's Republic of China | Ministry of Foreign Affairs | Ministry of Foreign Affairs Bullding | 1954 | No. 2, Chaoyangmen Nandajie | Chaoyang District | Beijing | |
| Croatia | Ministry of Foreign and European Affairs | Ministry of Foreign Affairs building | 1991 | Nikola Šubić Zrinski Square 7–8 | | Zagreb | |
| Cyprus | Ministry of Foreign Affairs | Ministry of Foreign Affairs building | 1961 | Leof. Proethrikou Megarou 1447 | | Nicosia | |
| Czech Republic | Ministry of Foreign Affairs | Czernin Palace | 1930s | Loretánské náměstí 5 | Hradčany, Prague 1 | Prague | |
| Denmark | Ministry of Foreign Affairs | Ministry of Foreign Affairs building | 1980 | Asiatisk Plads 2 | Christianshavn, Indre By | Copenhagen | |
| Egypt | Ministry of Foreign Affairs | Ministry of Foreign Affairs building | 1994 | | Boulaq | Cairo | |
| Estonia | Ministry of Foreign Affairs | Ministry of Foreign Affairs building | 1968 | Iceland Square 1 | Sibulaküla, Kesklinn | Tallinn | |
| Finland | Ministry for Foreign Affairs | Merikasarmi | 1918 | Laivastokatu 22 | Katajanokka | Helsinki | |
| France | Ministry of Foreign Affairs | Ministry of Foreign Affairs / Quai d'Orsay building | 1853 | 37 Quai d'Orsay | 7th arrondissement | Paris, Île-de-France | |
| Germany | Federal Foreign Office | Foreign Office Building at Werderscher Markt | 2000 | Werderscher Markt 1 | Friedrichswerder, Mitte | Berlin | |
| Greece | Ministry of Foreign Affairs | Syggros Manor | 1921 | Leof. Vasilissis Sofias 5 | Syntagma | Athens | |
| Hungary | Ministry of Foreign Affairs | Ministry of Foreign Affairs building | 1945 | Fő útca 81–83 | Castle District | Budapest | |
| Iceland | Ministry for Foreign Affairs | Ministry for Foreign Affairs building | 1981 | Rauðarárstígur 25 | | Reykjavík | |
| India | Ministry of External Affairs | South Block, Secretariat Building | 1946 | Raisina Hill | Lutyens' Delhi | New Delhi, Delhi | |
| Indonesia | Ministry of Foreign Affairs | Gedung Pancasila | 1950 | Jl. Taman Pejambon no. 6 | Gambir, Central Jakarta | DKI Jakarta | |
| Iran | Ministry of Foreign Affairs | Shahrbani Palace | 1936 | National Garden | District 12 | Tehran | |
| Ireland | Department of Foreign Affairs and Trade | Iveagh House | 1862 | 80 Saint Stephen's Green | | Dublin | |
| Israel | Ministry of Foreign Affairs | Ministry of Foreign Affairs building | 2001 | | Givat Ram | Jerusalem | |
| Italy | Ministry of Foreign Affairs | Palazzo della Farnesina | 1959 | Piazzale della Farnesina, 1 | Della Vittoria | Rome | |
| Japan | Ministry of Foreign Affairs | Ministry of Foreign Affairs Building | 1869 | 2-2-1 Kasumigaseki | Chiyoda-ku | Tokyo | |
| South Korea | Ministry of Foreign Affairs | Seoul Government Complex | 2002 | 60, Sajik-ro 8-gil | Jongno-gu | Seoul | |
| Latvia | Ministry of Foreign Affairs | Ministry of Foreign Affairs building | 1992 | Krišjāņa Valdemāra iela 3 | Northern District | Riga | |
| Lithuania | Ministry of Foreign Affairs | Ministry of Foreign Affairs building | 1992 | J. Tumo-Vaižganto 2 | Naujamiestis | Vilnius | |
| Malaysia | Ministry of Foreign Affairs | Wisma Putra | 2001 | 1, Jalan Wisma Putra | Presint 2 | Putrajaya | |
| Malta | Ministry for Foreign and European Affairs | Palazzo Parisio | 1973 | Merchant Street | | Valletta | |
| Mexico | Secretariat of Foreign Affairs | Edificio Tlateolco | 2005 | Ave. Juarez 20 | Cuauhtémoc | Mexico City | |
| Netherlands | Ministry of Foreign Affairs | Ministry of Foreign Affairs building | 2017 | Rijnstraat 8 | | The Hague | |
| Norway | Ministry of Foreign Affairs | Victoria Terrasse | 1905 | | Sentrum | Oslo | |
| Poland | Ministry of Foreign Affairs | Ministry of Foreign Affairs building | 1989 | al. Szucha 23 | Śródmieście | Warsaw | |
| Portugal | Ministry of Foreign Affairs | Necessidades Palace | 1950 | Largo do Rilvas | Estrela (Lisbon) | Lisbon | |
| Romania | Ministry of Foreign Affairs | Ministry of Foreign Affairs building | 1950s | Aleea Alexandru 31 | Sector 1 | Bucharest | |
| Russia | Ministry of Foreign Affairs | Ministry of Foreign Affairs of Russia Building | 1953 | 32 Smolenskaya-Sennaya Square | | Moscow (federal city) | |
| Serbia | Ministry of Foreign Affairs | Ministry of Forestry and Mining and Ministry of Agriculture and Waterworks Building | 1991 | Kneza Miloša street 24–26 | | Belgrade | |
| Slovakia | Ministry of Foreign and European Affairs | Palugyay Palace | 2002 | Praška | Old Town, Bratislava | Bratislava | |
| Slovenia | Ministry of Foreign and European Affairs | Mladika Complex | 2000 | Prešernova cesta 25 | Center District | Ljubljana | |
| South Africa | Department of International Relations and Cooperation | OR Tambo Building | 2009 | 460 Soutpansberg Road | Rietondale | Pretoria, Gauteng | |
| Spain | Ministry of Foreign Affairs, European Union and Cooperation | Ministry of Foreign Affairs building | 2022 | Plaza del Marqués de Salamanca 8 | Salamanca (Madrid) | Madrid | |
| Sweden | Ministry for Foreign Affairs | Arvfurstens palats | 1906 | Gustav Adolfs torg | Norrmalm | Stockholm | |
| Switzerland | Federal Department of Foreign Affairs | Federal Palace of Switzerland (west wing) | 1887 | Bundesplatz 3 | | Bern | |
| Thailand | Ministry of Foreign Affairs | Ministry of Foreign Affairs building | 1992 | 443 Sri Ayutthaya Rd | Ratchathewi | Bangkok | |
| Turkey | Ministry of Foreign Affairs | Ministry of Foreign Affairs complex | 1987 | Dr. Sadık Ahmet Caddesi | Balgat | Ankara | Dışişleribakanlığı |
| Ukraine | Ministry of Foreign Affairs | Ministry of Foreign Affairs building | 1938 | Mykhailivska Square, 1 | Shevchenkivskyi District | Kyiv | |
| United Kingdom | Foreign and Commonwealth Office | Foreign and Commonwealth Office main building | 1866 | King Charles Street | Whitehall | Greater London, England | |
| United States | United States Department of State | Harry S Truman Building | 1941 | 2201 C Street NW | Foggy Bottom | Washington, D.C. | |
| Uruguay | Ministry of Foreign Relations | Palacio Santos | 1955 | Avenida 18 de Julio 1205 | Central Montevideo | Montevideo | |
| Venezuela | Ministry of Foreign Affairs | Yellow House | 1874 | Av. Este 0 | Historic City Center | Caracas | |
