= Bahrain–Saudi Arabia relations =

- Bahrain: Saudi Arabia

Relations exist between Bahrain and Saudi Arabia. Relations between the two are close and friendly.

== Today ==
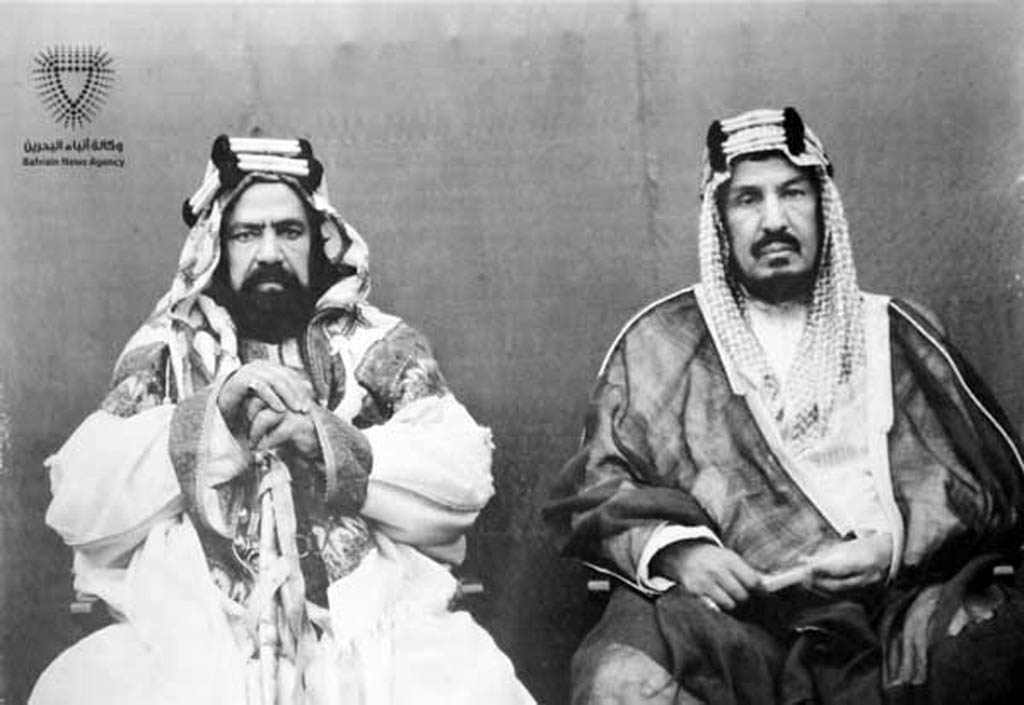
Salman bin Hamad Al Khalifa I with the Saudi king Ibn Saud. Photo taken prior to 1953.

Both are Sunni monarchies with both a Sunni and Shiite population, and both are members of the Gulf Cooperation Council. This became particularly important during the Arab Spring, when long-serving strongmen were toppled across the Middle East, and the Bahraini uprising seemed to threaten to do the same to the Bahraini monarchy.

Citing fears of Iranian influence and its rights under the charter of the GCC, Bahrain's monarchy invited Saudi forces in to suppress the rebellion. This was the first case of the GCC agreement on defense being used internally. Saudi Arabia was also concerned to prevent spread of discontent inside its territories.

== Resident diplomatic missions ==
- Bahrain has an embassy in Riyadh and a consulate-general in Jeddah.
- Saudi Arabia has an embassy in Manama.

== See also ==
- Foreign relations of Bahrain
- Foreign relations of Saudi Arabia
- King Fahd Causeway
