= Bahrain–Kuwait relations =

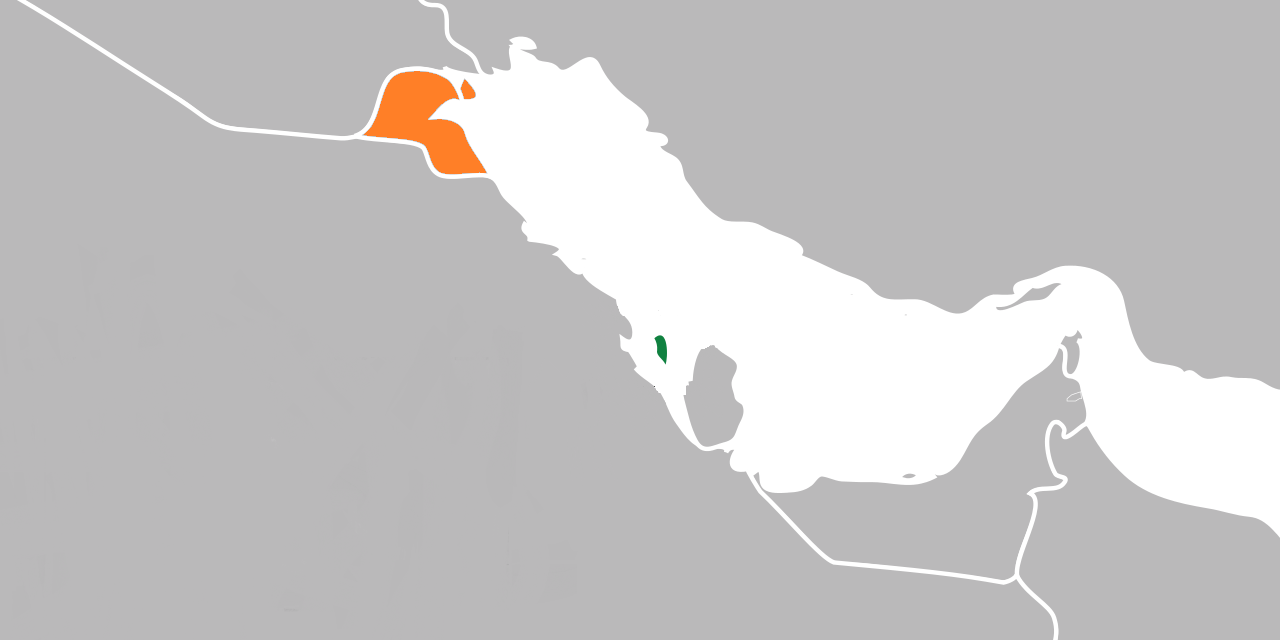

- Bahrain: Kuwait

Envoy
- Embassy of Bahrain, Kuwait City: Embassy of Kuwait, Manama

Bilateral relations between the Kingdom of Bahrain and the State of Kuwait began on 19 August 1971. Both countries are members of the Gulf Cooperation Council and the Organisation of Islamic Cooperation.

On 5 July 2011, the media advisor to the Bahraini monarch, Nabil al-Hamir, was quoted as saying that Bahrain–Kuwait relations "have stood the test of time" and "have coalesced into a binding brotherhood between the nations".

On 7 November 2014, the Kuwaiti emir, Sabah Al-Ahmad Al-Jaber Al-Sabah visited Bahrain and called upon the Bahraini monarch. They discussed ways to increase unity in the GCC and regional and global developments.

Sheikha Sheia bint Hassan Al Khrayyesh Al Ajmi, the second wife of the current Ruler of Bahrain Sheikh Hamad bin Isa Al Khalifa, is from Kuwait.

== Resident diplomatic missions ==
- Bahrain has an embassy in Kuwait City.
- Kuwait has an embassy in Manama.

== See also ==
- Foreign relations of Bahrain
- Foreign relations of Kuwait
