= Bahrain–Malaysia relations =

- Bahrain: Malaysia

Foreign relations exist between Bahrain and Malaysia. Bahrain has an embassy in Kuala Lumpur, and Malaysia has an embassy in Manama. Malaysia also are the strong supporters to the Bahrain national dialogue during the 2011 civil unrest and willing to send a peacekeeping forces to help the country. Both countries are members of Organisation of Islamic Cooperation.

== Economic relations ==
Trade relations between the two countries are currently increasing. Bahrain has invited Malaysia's business community to invest in the country. Thus, many Malaysian firms has already represented in Bahrain and been involved in major projects including the building of the Bahrain International Circuit, Bahrain City Centre and many other infrastructure projects, such as the expansion of the Sitra Causeway. Between January–October 2007, the bilateral trade between the two countries stood at U$191 million and around 7,200 Bahraini has visit Malaysia in the same year. Bahrain also in the process to become a business destination. Both countries also competes in the sector of Islamic banking. Malaysia stepped in to host the Formula One 2026 Bahrain Grand Prix due to the conflict in the Middle East.

== See also ==
- Foreign relations of Bahrain
- Foreign relations of Malaysia
