= Nancy Khedouri =

Bahraini politician, businesswoman and writer

Representative in the National Assembly
- In office 2010–present

Personal details
- Born: London, United Kingdom

Nancy Dinah Elly Khedouri (Arabic: نانسي دينا إيلي خضوري; born 1975) is a Bahraini politician, businesswoman and author. She has been a member of the National Assembly of Bahrain since 2010.

== Early life and family ==
The Khedouris family are one of the Jewish families in Bahrain, a family of importers of tablecloths and linens. Her direct family is third generation in Bahrain, and she is the cousin of Houda Nonoo, the Bahraini Ambassador to the United States from 2008 to 2013. In her 2007 book From Our Beginning to Present Day, she documented the history of Bahraini Jews from the first settlers (late 1880s) to present days.

== Political career ==
In 2010, Nancy Khedouri became a member of the National Assembly of Bahrain. She has worked on smoothing relationships with Israel by appearing publicly with political figures such as Yisrael Katz. In April 2017, she represented her country at the World Jewish Congress.

== Publications ==
- From Our Beginning to Present Day (Arabic: بداياتنا و حتى وقتنا الحاضر), Manama, Bahrain, 2007 ISBN 978-99901-26-04-4
