= Embassy of Turkey, Manama =

Diplomatic mission of the Republic of Turkey to the Kingdom of Bahrain

Ambassador of Turkey to Bahrain
- Türkiye Cumhuriyeti Manama Büyükelçisi
- Seal of the Turkish Ministry of Foreign Affairs

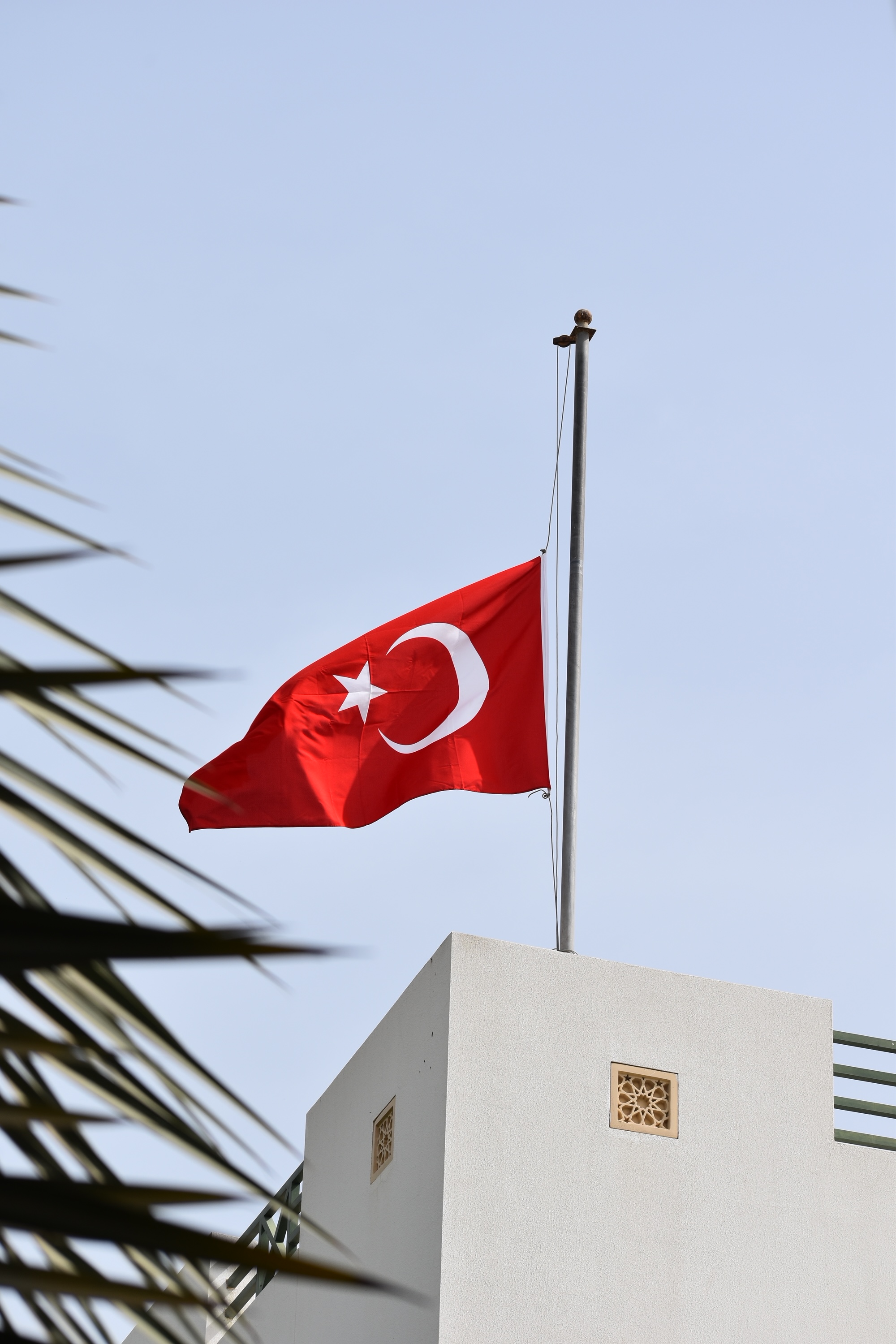
- The flag of Turkey at half-mast above the embassy
- Incumbent; Esin Çakıl since 2021
- Appointer: The president of Turkey
- Inaugural holder: Yavuz Aktaş
- Formation: 1987
- Website: manama.be.mfa.gov.tr

The Embassy of Turkey to Bahrain is the diplomatic mission of Turkey in Bahrain. The embassy is located in the capital city of Manama and serves as the primary point of contact between the Turkish government and the Bahraini government.

Established in 1976, the embassy represents Turkey's interests in Bahrain and provides consular services to Turkish citizens living or traveling in Bahrain. The embassy is also responsible for promoting and strengthening bilateral relations between Turkey and Bahrain in various fields such as politics, trade, culture, education, and tourism.

The embassy is headed by the ambassador of Turkey to Bahrain, who is appointed by the president of Turkey and approved by the Bahraini government. The embassy staff consists of diplomats, administrative personnel, and consular officers.

In addition to its diplomatic and consular functions, the embassy also plays a role in promoting Turkish culture and heritage in Bahrain. The embassy organizes various cultural events and activities throughout the year, such as exhibitions, concerts, film screenings, and conferences, to showcase Turkey's cultural heritage and strengthen cultural ties between the two countries.

== History ==
Diplomatic relations between Turkey and Bahrain were established on 12 April 1973 when the Turkish Embassy in Kuwait became accredited to Bahrain. A Turkish consulate was established in Diplomatic Area on 12 August 1986. The consulate was upgraded to a consulate-general on 2 February 1988. Lastly, the mission upgraded to an embassy on 19 December 1990 with Günaltay Şibay serving as the first Turkish ambassador to Bahrain.

== See also ==
- List of diplomatic missions of Turkey
- Bahrain–Turkey relations
