= Bahrain–Germany relations =

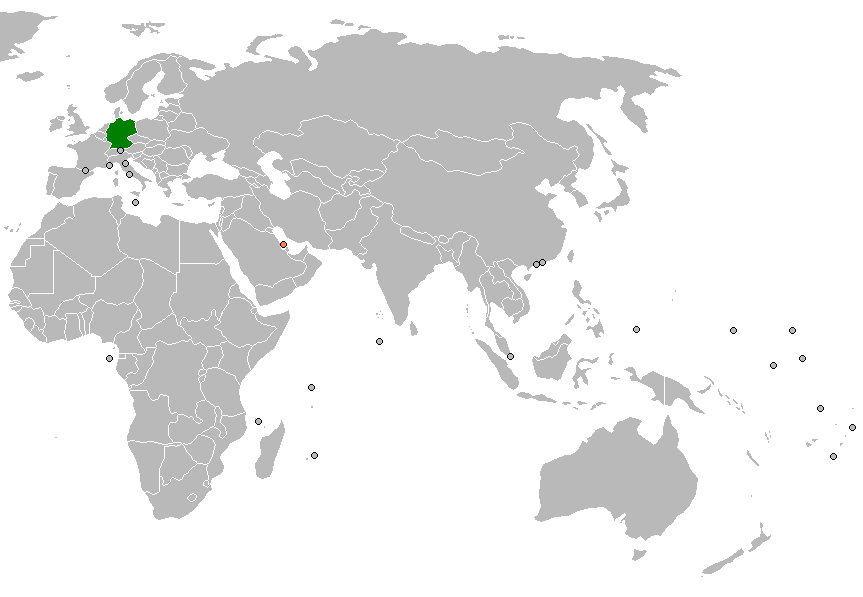

- Bahrain: Germany

Bahrain-Germany relations have existed since 1972 and are described as "good" by the German Foreign Office. Germany enjoys a good reputation in Bahrain, and the German economy in particular is highly regarded.

== History ==
Bahrain became independent of the United Kingdom in 1971 and established diplomatic relations with the Federal Republic of Germany one year later. In 1986, the German Embassy was opened in Manama. In 2008, Bahraini monarch Hamad bin Isa Al Khalifa visited the German capital Berlin, and two years later, German Chancellor Angela Merkel and Bundestag President Norbert Lammert visited Bahrain. During the Arab Spring, Crown Prince Salman bin Hamad Al Khalifa visited Berlin in 2011 to review the events. In 2014, Bundestag Vice President Claudia Roth visited Bahrain.

== Economic relations ==
The total volume of Germany's trade with Bahrain amounted to over 660 million euros in 2021, putting Bahrain in 92nd place in the ranking of German trading partners. Nearly 30 German companies are represented in Bahrain, including many small and medium-sized enterprises. Nearly 500 German citizens live in Bahrain. A bilateral investment promotion and protection agreement was signed in 2007 and entered into force in 2010.

== Cultural relations ==
The German Academic Exchange Service and the Goethe-Institut are active in the country through their offices in Abu Dhabi and have intensified university and student exchanges. German language courses have been offered by the German Embassy since 2009. In 2013, the Berlin-Brandenburg Academy of Sciences and Humanities founded the Arab German Young Academy (AGYA) together with the Arabian Gulf University in Bahrain to promote young scientists and facilitate research collaboration.

== Sports ==
Germans Wolfgang Sidka (2000–2003, 2005) and Hans-Peter Briegel (2006–2007) were coaches of the Bahrain national football team. Michael Roth briefly coached Bahrain's national handball team in 2020.

== Military relations ==
German defense companies supplied various weapons to Bahrain, including combat aircraft (2016), helicopters (1977–1994), assault rifles, and submachine guns (2003).

== Diplomatic missions ==
- Germany has an embassy in Manama.
- Bahrain has an embassy in Berlin.
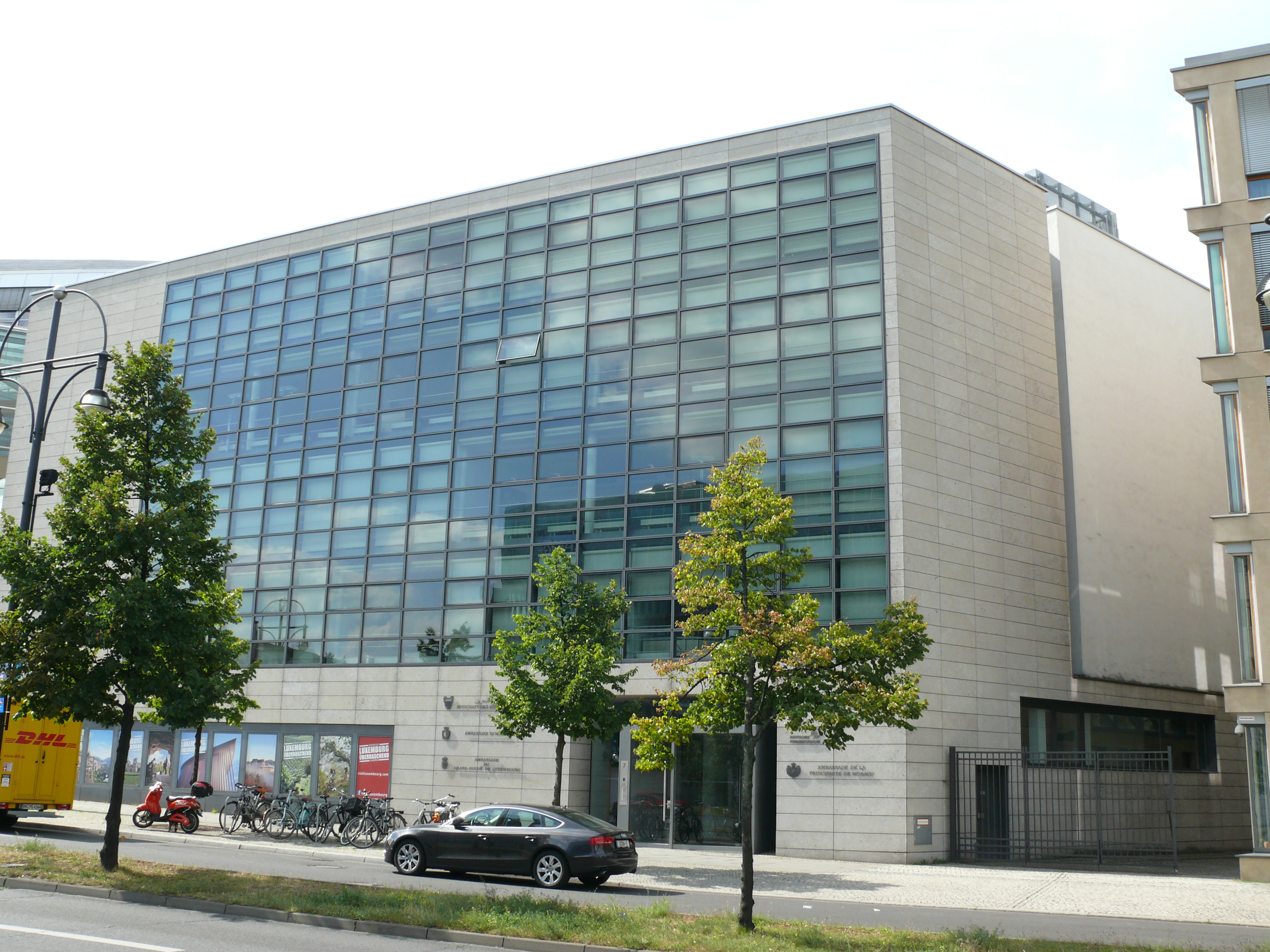
Embassy of Bahrain in Berlin
