= Bahrain–Portugal relations =

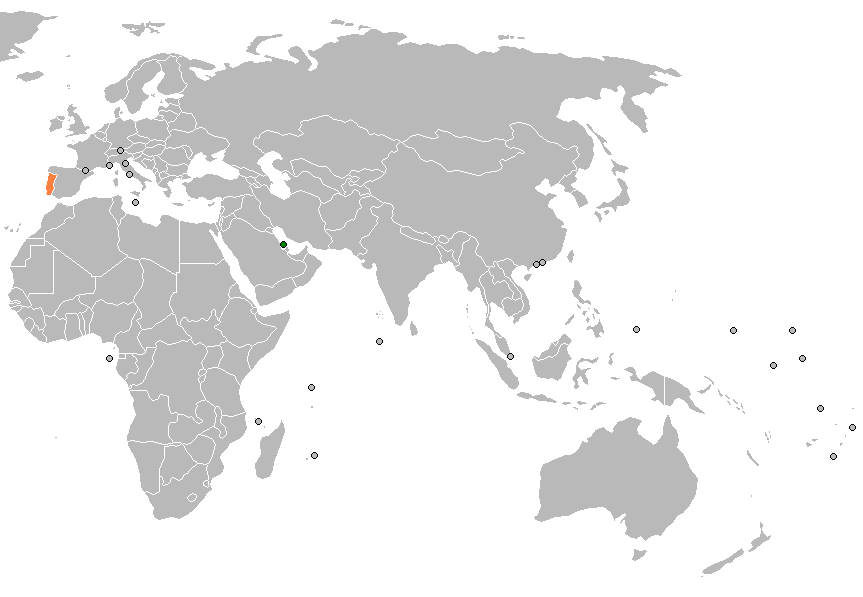

- Bahrain: Portugal

Foreign relations were established between Bahrain and Portugal on 10 June 1976. Portugal maintains an honorary consulate in Mahazza, Bahrain.

Portugal has a non-resident Ambassador in Riyadh (Saudi Arabia) accredited to Bahrain.

== History ==
Bahrain was ruled by the Portuguese Empire from 1521 until 1602, when they were expelled by Shah Abbas I of the Safavid dynasty.

=== Portuguese rule ===
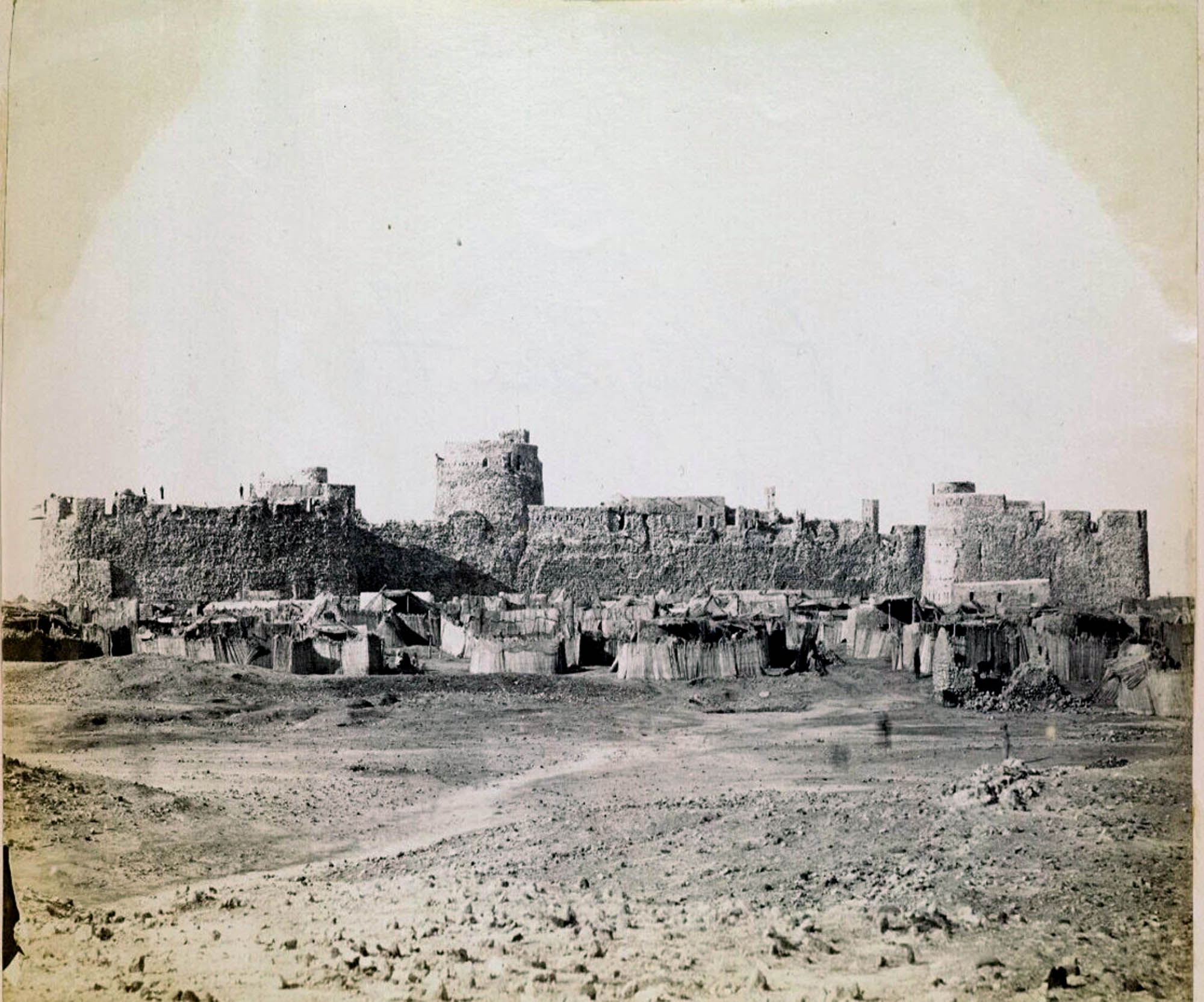
The Portuguese Fort in 1870.

Ahmad Bin Majid, the Arab navigator, arrived in Bahrain in 1489 prior to the Portuguese' arrival in the region and gave an account of the country: "In Awal (Bahrain) there are 360 villages and fresh water can be found in a number of places. A most wonderful al-Qasasir, where a man can dive into the salt sea with a skin and can fill it with fresh water while he is submerged in the salt water. Around Bahrain are pearl fisheries and a number of islands all of which have pearl fisheries and connected with this trade are 1,000 ships" (Majid, Arab Navigation in the Indian Ocean before the Coming of the Portuguese. Trans. G.R. Tibbetts. The Royal Asisatic Society of Great Britain and Ireland, 1981. page 222).

Portuguese expansion into the Indian Ocean in the early 16th century followed Vasco da Gama's voyages of exploration in which the Portuguese battled the Ottomans up the coast of the Persian Gulf. The Portuguese, drawn in by the lucrative trade routes of the Gulf, sought control of the strategic Ormus region before setting its sights on Bahrain. Portuguese ships first entered the Gulf in 1485, the first reputed Portuguese traveller to visit Bahrain was Duarte Barbosa. After the Kingdom of Hormuz fell in 1507, Hormuz' political control of Bahrain was lost after the island fell to the princes of Al-Hasa. A combined Portuguese-Hormuz force led by António Correia conquered Bahrain in 1521 only to briefly lose it to the princes of Al-Hasa the same year. In response, the Portuguese sent another expedition to Bahrain and the Arabian coast and subdued the Al-Hasa attempts to regain power.

The Portuguese later consolidated their position of the island by reconstructing the Qal'at al Bahrain fortress, which was to serve as the base for the Portuguese garrison. It is believed that the Portuguese ruled the islands via indirect rule, with some force, against the inhabitants for eighty years, despite incurring several revolts and protests (one of which resulted in temporary independence in 1534). Such a revolt was the rebellion of 1529 saw the deployment of a 400-man Portuguese force sent to subdue the island.

Except for a brief period in 1559 when the governor of the Ottoman province of Al-Hasa tried to occupy the islands but were repelled, the Portuguese remained in control until they were driven out of the island in 1602, when a popular uprising led by Rukn ed-Din took control of the Bahrain Fort. The uprising was sparked by the governor's order of the execution of the island's richest traders. Portuguese attempts to retake Bahrain were thwarted due to aid from the prince of Shiraz. The uprising coincided with regional disputes between the Portuguese and rival European powers. The power vacuum that resulted was almost immediately filled by the Persian ruler, Shah Abbas I, who deployed a Persian garrison to the Bahrain Fort and subsumed it within the Safavid Empire.

== Trade ==
=== In Bahraini dinars ===
Volume of Exchange	Re-export	Exports	Imports	Year
6,355,204		2,988,134	3,367,070	2013
6,198,219	8,000	9,200	6,181,019	2014
6,649,279	132,075	278,436	6,238,768	2015
6,751,671	58,025	143,322	6,550,324	2016
18,531,135	4,009	4,309	18,522,817	2017
8,014,918		25,544	7,989,374	2018
8,232,964		849,428	7,383,536	2019
7,152,448		875,503	6,276,945	2020

== Agreements ==
On 26 May 2015, a convention was signed in Manama between Portugal and Bahrain for the Avoidance of Double Taxation and the Prevention of Fiscal Evasion with respect to taxes on income.

== Diplomatic visits ==
Guest	Host	Place of visit	Date of visit
(Bahrain) Assistant Undersecretary for Culture and National Heritage at the Ministry of Information Shaikha Mai bint Mohammed Al Khalifa	UNESCO	Institute of Architectural Heritage, University of Coimbra, Lisbon	May, 2006
(Portugal) Director of the International Public Relations Office at the Portuguese-Arab Chamber of Commerce and Industry	Kingdom of Bahrain	Portuguese-Arab Chamber of Commerce and Industry	March, 2009
(Portugal) Secretary of State for the Internationalization of the Portuguese Economy Jorge Costa Oliveira	Kingdom of Bahrain	Kingdom of Bahrain	May 4, 2016

== See also ==
- Foreign relations of Bahrain
- Foreign relations of Portugal
