= Bahrain–United States Free Trade Agreement =

Agreement between the United States of America and the Kingdom of Bahrain on the Establishment of a Free Trade Area
United States–Bahrain Free Trade Agreement (USBFTA) (American English); اتفاقية التجارة الحرة بين الولايات المتحدة الأمريكية ومملكة البحرين (Arabic)
- Type: Free trade agreement
- Drafted: September 14, 2004
- Signed: September 14, 2004
- Location: Washington, D.C., United States
- Effective: August 1, 2006
- Condition: 2 months after notification of each state that all internal procedures have been completed
- Ratifiers: Bahrain; United States
- Languages: English; Arabic

United States-Bahrain Free Trade Agreement Implementation Act
- Long title: To implement the United States-Bahrain Free Trade Agreement.
- Enacted by: the 109th United States Congress

Citations
- Public law: Pub. L. 109–169 (text) (PDF)

Legislative history
- Introduced in the House of Representatives as H.R. 4340 by Roy Blunt (R-MO) on November 16, 2005; Committee consideration by House Ways and Means; Passed the House of Representatives on December 7, 2005 (327-95); Passed the Senate on December 13, 2005 (Unanimous Consent); Signed into law by President George W. Bush on January 11, 2006

The United States–Bahrain Free Trade Agreement (USBFTA) is a free trade agreement (FTA) between the United States and Bahrain, signed on September 14, 2004. It was ratified by the United States House of Representatives on December 7, 2005, by 327–95, with 10 not voting.

The United States Senate approved the bill on December 13, 2005, by voice vote. President George W. Bush signed the USBFTA Implementation Act into law (Pub. L. 109–169 (text) (PDF)) on January 11, 2006. The FTA was implemented on August 1, 2006, and will reduce certain barriers of trade between the two countries.

Early stages of the Bahrain–U.S. free trade negotiations go back to the year 1999, with the signing of a Bilateral Investment Treaty (BIT), which entered into force May 31, 2001. It is the first such treaty signed between the United States and a member of the GCC, and is aimed at stimulating the flow of private investment between the two countries. Both parties agreed that a stable framework for investment would maximize effective utilization of economic resources and improve living standards. One year later, a Trade and Investment Framework Agreement (TIFA) was signed on June 18, 2002, representing the prelude for the FTA negotiations. The TIFA was designed as a forum for an ongoing bilateral dialogue on economic reform and trade liberalization.

== See more ==
- Rules of Origin
- Market access
- Free-trade area
- Tariffs
