= Hatun Demirer =

Turkish diplomat

Turkish Ambassador to Bahrain
- In office 6 November 2013 – 15 December 2017

Permanent Representative of Turkey to the OSCE
- Incumbent
- Assumed office 8 March 2021

Personal details
- Children: 2
- Education: Middle East Technical University (BA)

Hatun Demirer is a Turkish diplomat and Turkey's Permanent Representative to the Organization for Security and Co-operation in Europe (OSCE).

== Education and early career ==
Demirer holds a bachelor's degree in International Relations from Middle East Technical University in Ankara. She joined the Turkish Ministry of Foreign Affairs in 1990 and has since served in various positions in Turkey's diplomatic missions abroad and at the Ministry's headquarters in Ankara. She served as the Turkish Ambassador to Bahrain from October 2013 to December 2017. She then acted as the Director General in charge of consulates, migration, and visas until March 8, 2021.

== Career at the OSCE ==
On March 8, 2021, Demirer was appointed as Turkey's Permanent Delegate to the OSCE, succeeding Ambassador Tacan İldem. As the Permanent Delegate, she represents Turkey in the OSCE's decision-making bodies, including the Permanent Council and the Ministerial Council. She is also responsible for promoting Turkey's policies and interests in the OSCE's three dimensions of security: politico-military, economic and environmental, and human rights.

== Personal life ==
Demirer is married to fellow ambassador Yunus Demirer and has two children.
