= Nazar Al Baharna =

Bahraini academic and politician

- نزار البحارنة

Minister of State for Foreign Affairs
- In office 2006–2011

Personal details
- Born: 1950 (age 75–76)
- Education: University of Petroleum and Minerals (BSc, MEng); University of Wales (PhD)
- Occupation: Academic; entrepreneur; politician

Nizar Al Baharna (Note: Arabic: نزار البحارنة) (born 1950) is a Bahraini academic, entrepreneur and politician.

== Early life and education ==
Baharna was born in 1950. He is a graduate of the University of Petroleum and Minerals in Saudi Arabia. He received both bachelor's and master's degrees in mechanical engineering there. He also obtained a PhD in mechanical engineering from the University of Wales in 1979.

== Career ==
He gained the position of the head of the Engineering Department at Gulf Technical College soon after earning his doctorate. Then, Baharna began to work at the University of Bahrain in different capacities until 1995. The last academic post he held was the vice president for academic programs and scientific studies at the University of Bahrain. After leaving academia he established a consulting firm in Bahrain. He is a founding member of the Al Wefaq National Islamic Society which he left in 2004. However, one year later he rejoined the society. In November 2005 he became deputy chairman of the Bahrain Chamber of Commerce and Industry.

He was appointed minister of state for foreign affairs on 11 December 2006. Baharna, a Shia, remained in the post until February 2011. Then he returned to work as chairman at his company, Technology Consulting Group. He is also a visiting scholar researcher at Georgetown University. He is a member of the advisory board of the Iman Foundation.

In 2013, Baharna published a book, A Universal Human Rights Model.
