= Ministry of Foreign Affairs (Bahrain) =

Government ministry of Bahrain

- وزارة الخارجية

Ministry overview
- Type: Government Ministry
- Jurisdiction: Cabinet of Bahrain
- Headquarters: Government Road, Manama; 26°14′15.96″N 50°34′42.14″E
- Minister responsible: Abdullatif bin Rashid Al Zayani, Minister of Foreign Affairs
- Website: mofa.gov.bh

The Bahraini Ministry of Foreign Affairs was established in 1971 by an Amiri Decree which also defined its duties and responsibilities and was followed in the same year by Amiri Decree No. (4) for the Year 1971 Regulating the Diplomatic and Consular Corps. Under the decree, the Ministry of Foreign Affairs assumed the responsibility of coordinating and implementing all matters related to the state's foreign policy and its international relations with other countries and international organizations as well as looking after and protecting the interests of Bahraini citizens abroad.

The Ministry of Foreign Affairs operated within the premises of the Government House (Dar Al Hukuma) until 1983, when it moved to its current own building.

== Beginnings of the diplomatic work ==
Soon after the establishment of the Ministry of Foreign Affairs, the Kingdom of Bahrain began participating in the Arab summits and meetings of the Arab Foreign Ministers, the United Nations General Assembly Sessions (UNGA), the ministerial meetings of the United Nations Security Council (UNSC), Non-Aligned Movement (NAM), Organization of Islamic Cooperation (OIC) and summits and ministerial meetings of the Gulf Cooperation Council (GCC).

== Early ambassadors ==
The early missions of the Kingdom of Bahrain were to New York, London and Cairo. Salman bin Daij was the first ambassador to London. Taqi Al Baharna headed the first mission to the Arab Republic of Egypt, assisted by Ibrahim Ali Ibrahim and Mustapha Kamal, while the first Bahraini ambassador to the United Nations was Salman Al Saffar.

== Ministers of Foreign Affairs ==
#	Name	Picture	Took office	Left office
1	Muhammad ibn Mubarak ibn Hamad Al Khalifah		12 January 1969	29 September 2005
2	Khalid bin Ahmed Al Khalifa		29 September 2005	11 February 2020
3	Dr. Abdullatif bin Rashid AlZayani		11 February 2020	Present

== See also ==
- Politics of Bahrain
- Cabinet of Bahrain
- List of foreign ministry headquarters
