= Khalid bin Ahmed Al Khalifa =

Bahraini politician (born 1960)

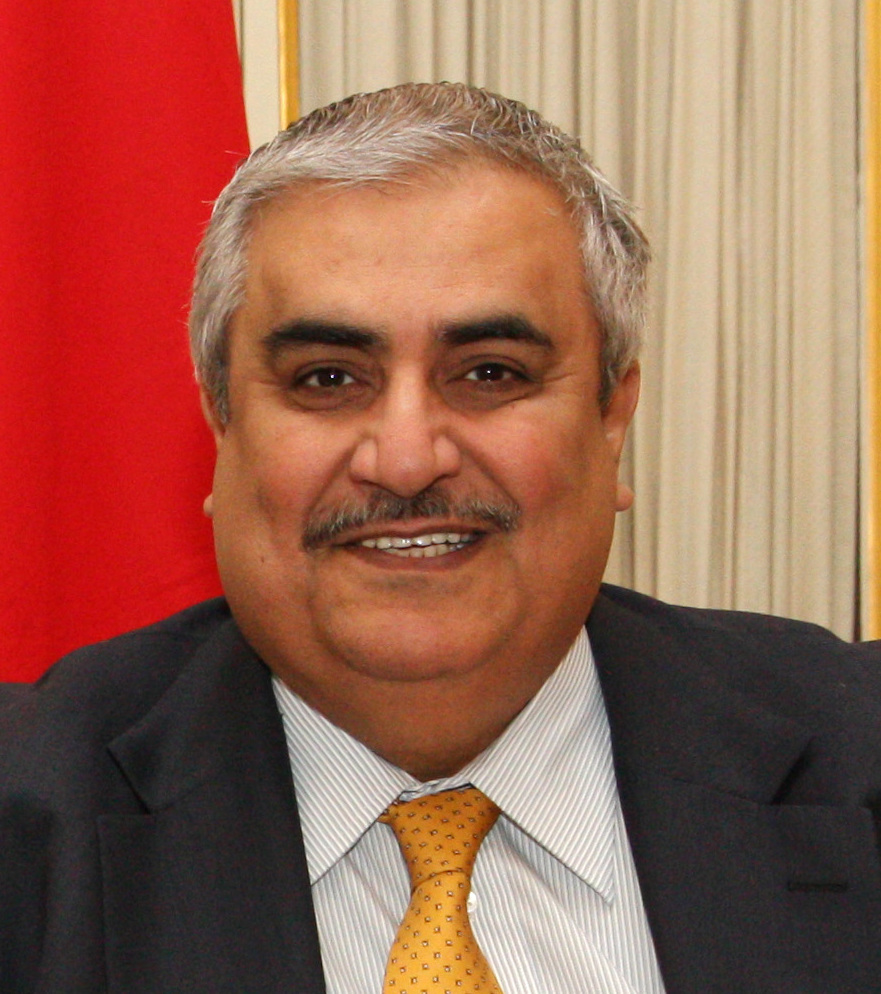
- Khalid bin Ahmed in 2015

Minister of Foreign Affairs of Bahrain
- In office 26 September 2005 – 11 February 2020
- Monarch: Hamad ibn Isa Al Khalifa
- Prime Minister: Khalifa ibn Salman
- Deputy: Nazar Al Baharna (2006–2011)
- Preceded by: Muhammad ibn Mubarak
- Succeeded by: Abdullatif bin Rashid

Personal details
- Born: 24 April 1960 (age 66) Manama, Bahrain
- Education: St. Edward's University

Styles of Sheikh Khalid bin Ahmed Al Khalifa
- Reference style: His Excellency
- Spoken style: Your Excellency
- Alternative style: Sheikh

Khalid bin Ahmed Al Khalifa (born 24 April 1960) is a Bahraini diplomat who served as Bahrain's Minister of Foreign Affairs from 2005 until January 2020. Khalid became only the second foreign minister in Bahrain's history after replacing Mohammed bin Mubarak Al Khalifa who then became Deputy Prime Minister of Bahrain.

== Early life and education ==
Khalid bin Ahmed was born on 24 April 1960. He received a bachelor's degree in history and political science from St. Edward's University in Austin, Texas, in 1984.

== Career ==
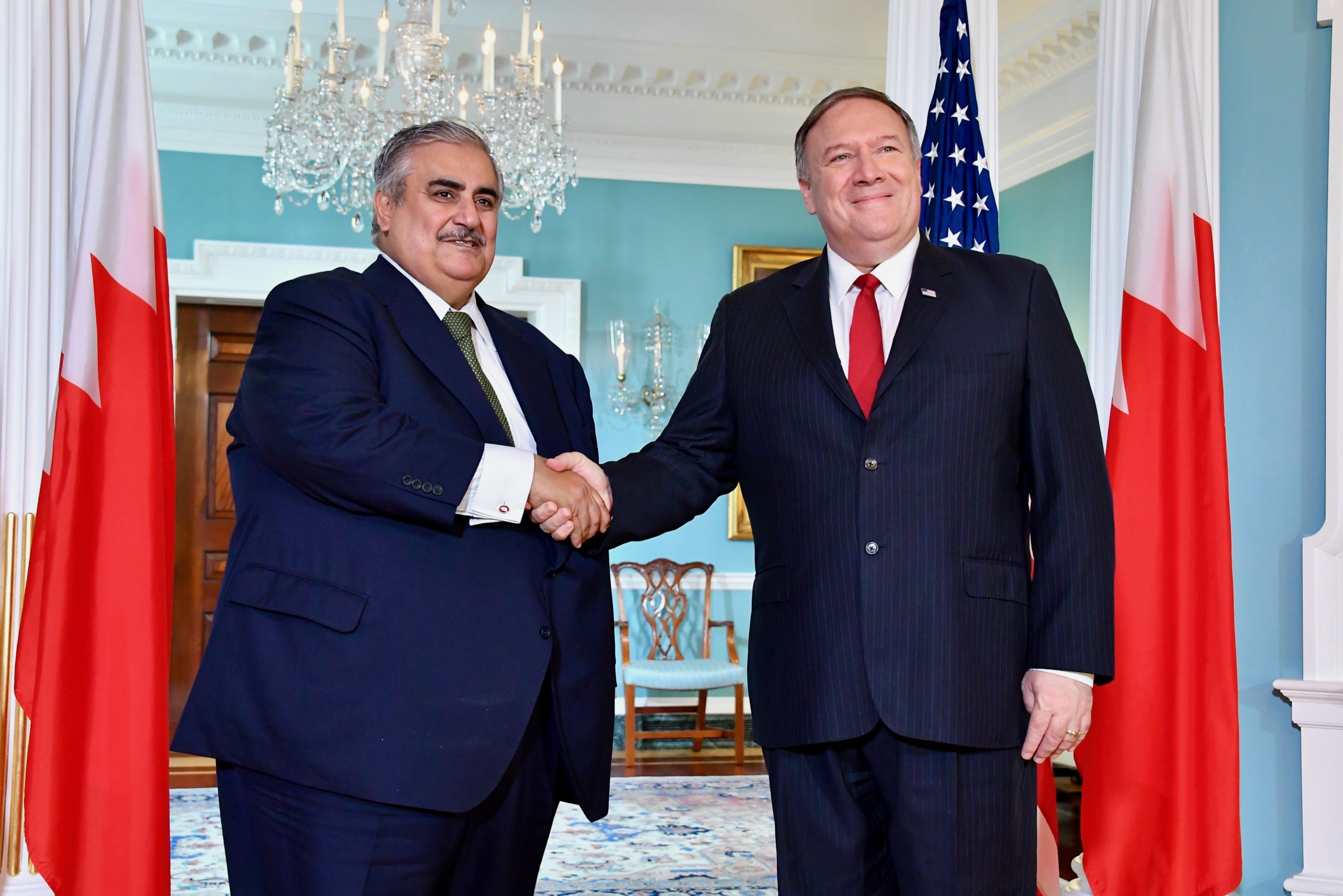
Khalid bin Ahmed and U.S. Secretary of State Mike Pompeo in Washington, D.C., 2019

Khalid bin Ahmed joined the Ministry of Foreign Affairs of Bahrain at the rank of third secretary on 1 March 1985. Between August 1985 and November 1994 he worked at Bahrain's embassy in Washington, D.C., where he was in charge of political, congressional, and media affairs. From June 1995 to August 2000 he worked as a chief liaison officer at the office of the deputy prime minister, minister of foreign affairs; responsible for the maritime delimitation and territorial dispute between Bahrain and Qatar, in addition to other tasks. In August 2000, he assumed the position of the director of public relations and information at the court of the Crown Prince.

He was Ambassador to the United Kingdom from 2001 to 2005, and was appointed as Minister of Foreign Affairs in a September 2005 cabinet reshuffle. His predecessor as foreign minister, Muhammad ibn Mubarak ibn Hamad Al Khalifah, had served in that position for over 30 years. His deputy until 2011 was Nazar Al Baharna, formerly a leading member of Al Wefaq, Bahrain's main Shia opposition party.

In May 2018 he expressed his support of Israeli airstrikes in Syria against Iranian targets, saying "it is the right of any country in the region, including Israel to defend itself by destroying sources of danger".

On 14 February 2019, Khalid bin Ahmed said that Israelis and Palestinians would be closer to a peace agreement if not for Iran's malign behavior. He said he grew up thinking that the Israeli-Palestinian conflict was the most important issue in the region, but now he sees that the "more toxic" challenge in the region is the Islamic Republic of Iran.

During a 25–26 June economic conference in Manama arranged by Jared Kushner to attract investors to the Palestinian territories, Khalid told Israel's channel 13: "Israel is part of this heritage of this whole region, historically, so the Jewish people have a place amongst us". The Palestinian Authority boycotted the two-day economic conference due to the White House's perceived Israeli bias.

== Honors and awards ==
He was awarded the Bahrain Second Class Medal by King Hamad bin Isa Al Khalifa in May 2001 in recognition of his contribution and role as a Liaison Officer during the territorial dispute between Bahrain and Qatar.

== See also ==
- List of foreign ministers in 2017
