= Hinduism in Bahrain =

Hindus in Bahrain
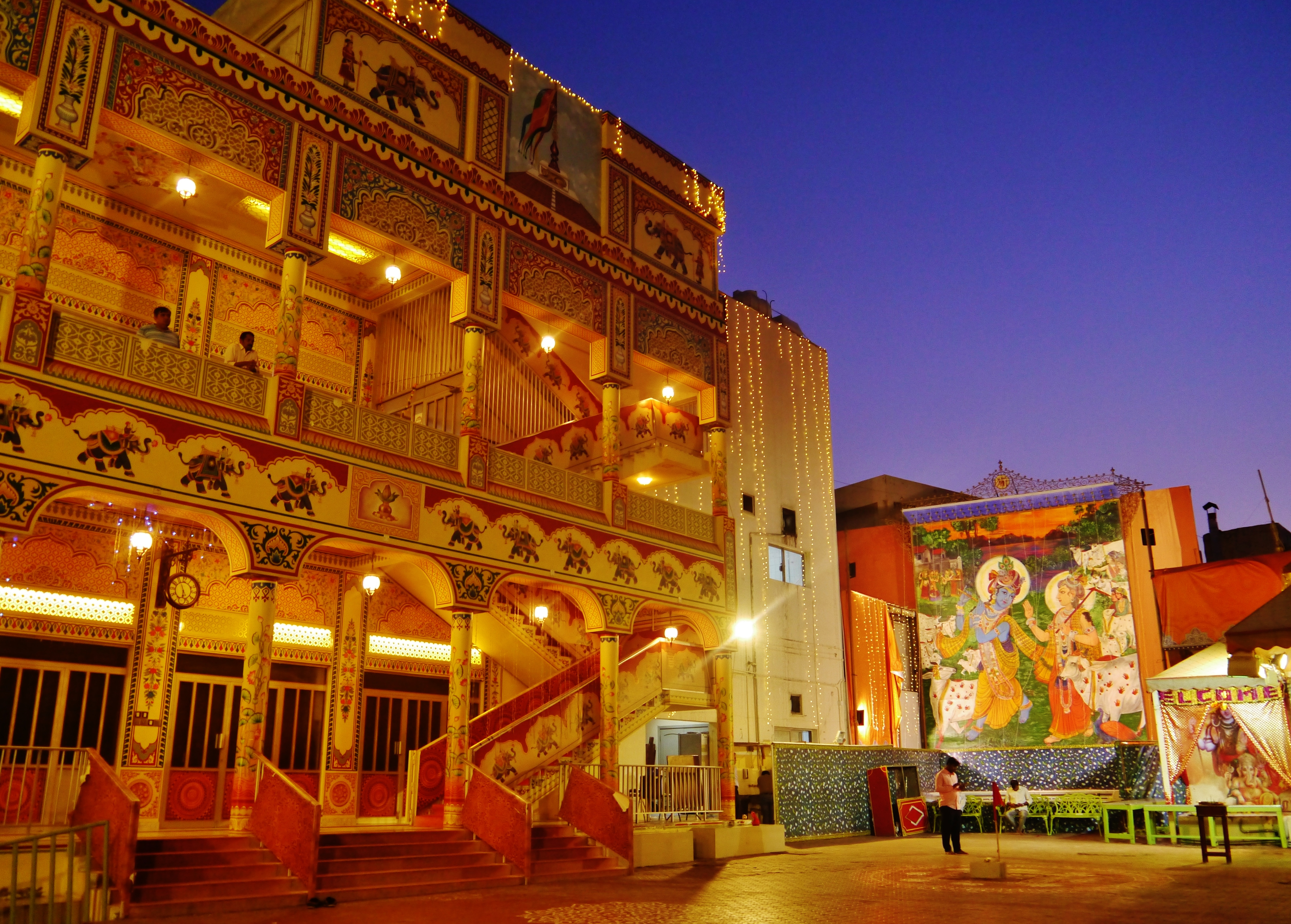
- Shrinathji Hindu Temple in Manama is one of the oldest Hindu temples in the Middle East

Total population
- 387,800 (2020)▲; 8.33% of total population

Regions with significant populations
- Manama

Religions
- Hinduism

Related ethnic groups
- Indians in Bahrain and Hindus

Hinduism in Bahrain is practiced primarily by members of the expatriate communities from India, Nepal and Bangladesh living in Bahrain. While Islam is the state religion, Bahrain is tolerant of minority religions, including Hinduism, and allows the operation of Hindu places of worship.

== History ==
Before the 19th century, there has been small Hindu community in the shores of Bahrain owing to the sea trade. The presence of Hindus in Bahrain dates back to the early 19th century, linked to Indian merchant communities engaged in regional trade. These merchants settled in Manama and established religious and commercial institutions that served the growing Indian population. The Lorimer's Gazetteer, noted that in 1905 there were 69 Hindus among the 191 British Indian subjects in Manama during colder months, but it increased to 175 Hindus out of 325 British Indian subjects during pearling season. Majority of the Hindus were Lohana and Bhattia communities from Sindh.

In 1817, the Shrinathji Temple dedicated to Shrinathji, a form of the Lord Krishna was constructed in Manama by the Hindu community.

== Demographics ==
Majority of the Indian Hindus in Bahrain are Kerala Hindus. According to the Boston University’s 2020 World Religions Database, Hinduism is followed by 6% of the population. According to the ARDA, Hinduism is followed by 8.33% of the population (3.54% are Vaishnavites, 2.74% are Shaivites and 2.05% Shaktists) in 2025. Some other sources cites population as 10%.

According to 2020 government data, there are approximately 387,800 Hindus in the country. all of whom are expatriates. Its unclear how many Hindu citizens are there in the country. The Bahrain Ministry of Information states that "99.8% of Bahraini citizens are Muslims. The percentage of Christians, Jews, Hindus, Baha’is is 0.2%." These Bahrain Hindu citizens are descendants of Indian origin Banias who settled before the oil era.

== Community Life ==
The Shrinathji Temple in Bahrain is one of the oldest temple in the Middle east region. Other Hindu temples are BAPS Shri Swaminarayan Mandir, ISKCON Balramdesh temple etc.

In February 2022, King Hamad bin Isa Al Khalifa granted land in Bahrain for the construction of a second, larger BAPS Swaminarayan Hindu temple, following a similar project completed in Abu Dhabi.

There is cremation facility for Hindus on land that was granted over 100 years ago. The Hindu celebrations are celebrated openly without any restrictions from the state. In Diwali celebrations, the Royal Highness Prince Salman bin Hamad Al Khalifa, and other ministers often visit Hindu families. In 2001, the King of Bahrain also appointed a Hindu member to the Parliament.

== See also ==
- Religion in Bahrain
- Hinduism in Oman
