= Bhatia caste =

Social group found in India and Pakistan

Bhatia
- Religions: Hinduism, Islam and Sikhism
- Populated states: Punjab, Rajasthan, Gujarat, Sindh
- Subdivisions: Kutchi, Halai, Kanthi, Navgam, Pachisgam, Thathai

Bhatia is a group of people and a caste found in Punjab, Rajasthan, Sindh and Gujarat regions of India and Pakistan. Traditionally, they have been a trading and merchant community. The Bhatias, Lohanas and Khatris were similar communities and were known to intermarry. The Bhatias recruit Saraswat Brahmins as priests.

== History ==
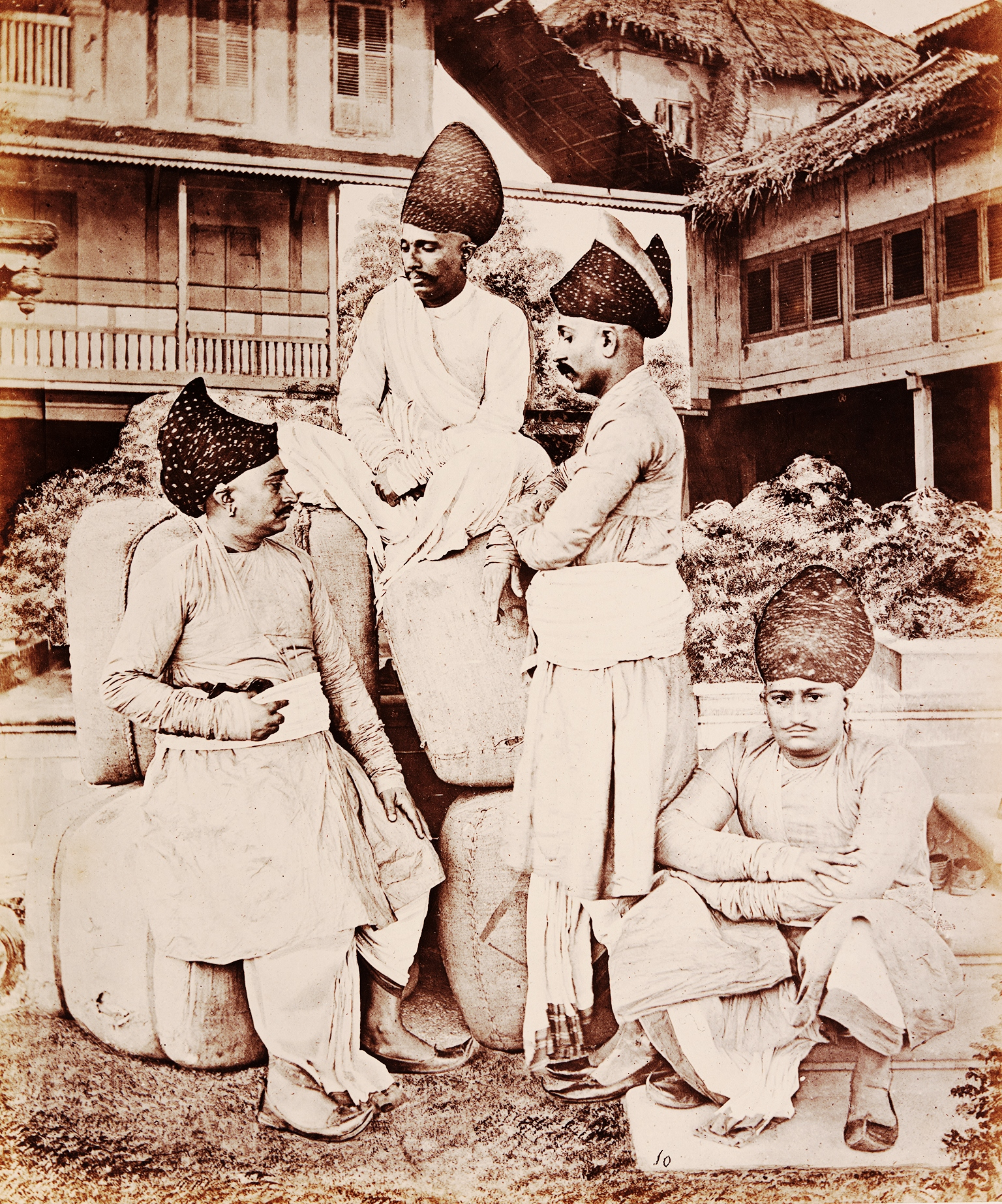
Bhatia men in western India (c. 1855-1862)

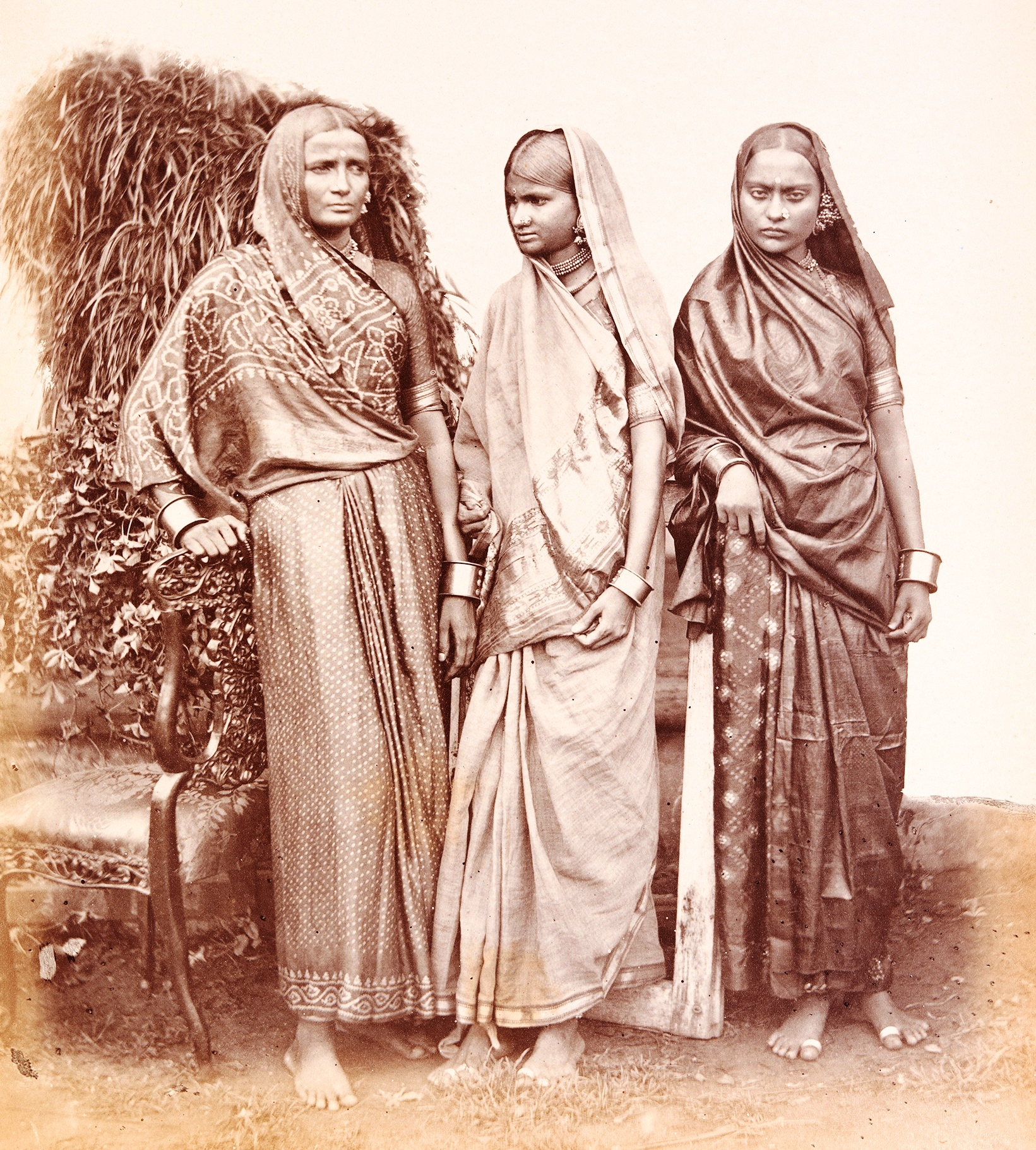
Bhatia women in western India (c. 1855-1862)

The Bhatias are a mercantile community - traditionally they were merchants and traders. The Bhatias primarily live in Northwestern India and Pakistan. According to B.N. Puri, Bhatias are a part of the Khatri community but along with Aroras and Soods maintained a distinct identity.

Before their traditional occupation of traders, both the Lohanas and Bhatia were involved in the profession of Agriculture. Historian Goswami states that their ritual position was "ambiguous", and, "they were considered neither a high nor a low caste". She further adds that as per the British Raj era Major general Alexander Cunningham, the word "Bhatia" is derived from the word "Bhat" meaning a warrior. The Bhatias claim that they are of Rajput origin. As per Goswami, they are a "traditional Bania caste". Historian Dwijendra Tripathi states that the Bhatias are associated with the Vaishyas like the Vaishnava Banias and sociologist A.M.Shah also considers the Bhatias to belong to the Vaishya varna like the Lohanas and Vanias.

The geographical origins of the Bhatia caste are uncertain. A more recent study by André Wink traces a 12th-century connection between the Bhatias of Jaisalmer and the Caulukyas of Gujarat, while Anthony O'Brien almost-contemporaneous attempt to discover their homeland caused him to place them around Sindh from the 7th century. Wink, who is a professor with interests in medieval and early modern Indian history, records that many of the community in Sindh converted to Islam during the reign of Firoz Shah Tughluq.

The Bhatias, who had been associated in particular with the Multan area in Sindh, were historically merchants and they probably formed part of the earliest Indian diaspora found in Central Asia, together with the Bhora and the Lohana communities. (Note: Claude Markovits, whose studies encompass commercial networks in colonial India, says that the Lohana term referred to all merchant communities of Sindh other than the Bhatias and the Khatris. Mark-Anthony Falzon considers all Sindhi Hindu communities to be jatis of the Lohana caste, with the exception of Brahmins and Bhatias.) Their emergence as a significant merchant group pre-dates the 17th century and certainly by the time that India became subject to colonial rule, the Bhatias and the other two early diaspora communities had established trade and moneylending networks that, according to Scott Levi, who specialises in the history of Central Asia, "... extended across Afghanistan, Central Asia, and eventually reached even beyond the Arabian Peninsula and East Africa to the Caribbean islands in the west, and to Southeast Asia and China in the east."

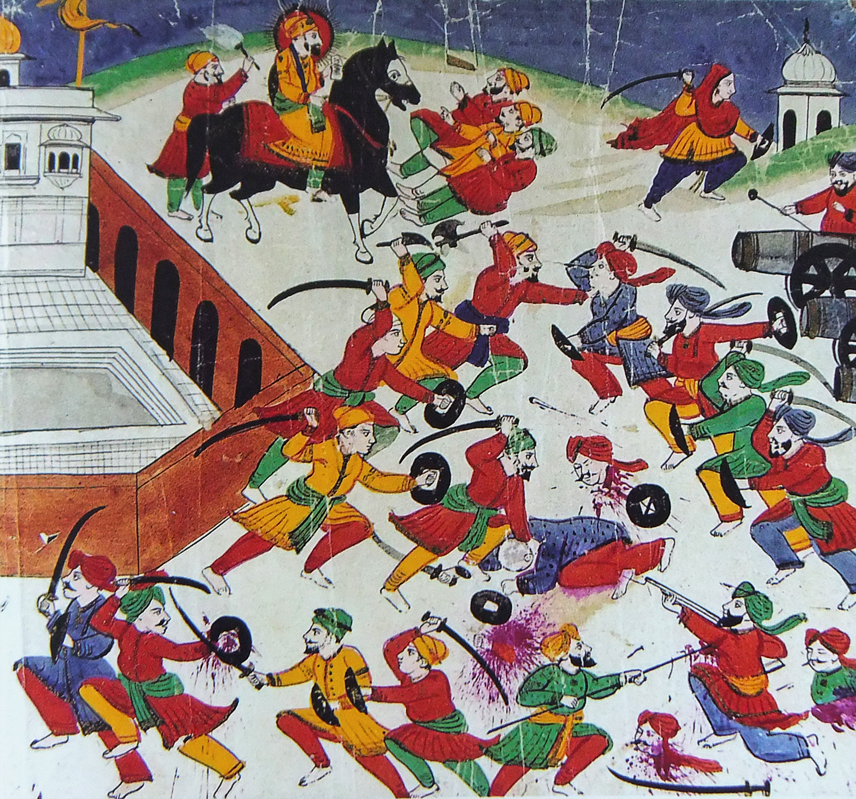
The Battle of Muktsar, in which 12% of known soldiers were Bhatias.

Bhatias along with Khatris and Lohanas were prominent merchants who had contacts right from Volga River (Russia) to Kolkata (India) The Bhatias, who had been associated in particular with the Multan area in Sindh, were historically merchants and they probably formed part of the earliest Indian diaspora found in Central Asia, together with the Bohra and the Lohana communities. (Note: Claude Markovits, whose studies encompass commercial networks in colonial India, says that the Lohana term referred to all merchant communities of Sindh other than the Bhatias and the Khatris. Mark-Anthony Falzon considers all Sindhi Hindu communities to be jatis of the Lohana caste, with the exception of Brahmins and Bhatias.) Their emergence as a significant merchant group pre-dates the 17th century and certainly by the time that India became subject to colonial rule, the Bhatias and the other two early diaspora communities had established trade and moneylending networks that, according to Scott Levi, who specialises in the history of Central Asia, "... extended across Afghanistan, Central Asia, and eventually reached even beyond the Arabian Peninsula and East Africa to the Caribbean islands in the west, and to Southeast Asia and China in the east." Bhatias of Thatta (Sindh) established a colony in Muscat (Oman) where they conducted international trade between Arabian peninsula and India.

During the Battle of Chamkaur, 5 out of the 40 Punjabi soldiers were Sikh Bhatias. They fought against a large army of Mughals. During the Battle of Mukstar, 40 Punjabis laid down their lives fighting against the Mughals. Out of the 25 soldiers whose caste is recorded, 3 soldiers belonged to Sikh Bhatia families.

Formerly the Bhāṭiyās were non-vegetarian.

== Religion ==
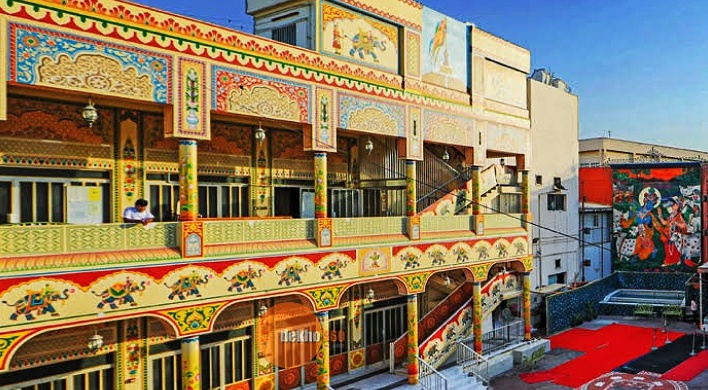
The oldest temple of Gulf was constructed by Bhatias of Thatta, Sindh in 1817.

Hindu Bhatias follow Vaishnavism. They revere Vishnu's avatars including Rama and Krishna. They also worship Hinglaj Mata as well as Dariya Sagar (sea). Moreover, some Bhatias are Jains. The oldest temple of Gulf, Shrinathji Temple in Bahrain was constructed by the Thatthai Bhatia community in 1814 and is still managed by them. It is dedicated to Lord Shrinathji, a form of Krishna. Dwarka Temples were largely funded by Bhatias.

Many Bhatias followed Sikhism. Bhai Banno was the son of Bishan Chand Bhatia of village Mangat of district Gujrat in Punjab (now in modern-day Pakistan). He became a faithful follower of Guru Arjan who involved him in the preparation of the Adi Granth.Maharaja Ranjit Singh's ancestors were initiated into Sikhism by the efforts of Bhai Banno Bhatia.

== Sub-groups ==
Among the Bhatias, there are different sub-castes, such as Jakhar, Kutchi, Veha, Halai, Kanthi, Pavrai, Navgam, Pachisgaam, Thattai and Punjabi. Bhatias from Kutch are Kutchi Bhatias, those from around Jamnagar district are known as Halai Bhatia, those from Sindh in present-day Pakistan are known as Sindhi Bhatias and those from Punjab in present-day India and Pakistan are known as Punjabi Bhatias. A large number of Punjabi Bhatias settled in Pakistani Punjab in 1947.

Some of the major groups derived from the principal professions they follow or the crafts they practice.

== See also ==
- Jatt Sikh
- Muslim Jat of Punjab
- Gujjar
