= Bahrain–India relations =

- Bahrain: India

Diplomatic mission
- Embassy of India, Manama: Embassy of Bahrain, New Delhi

Envoy
- Abdulrahman Mohammed Al Qaood: Piyush Srivastava

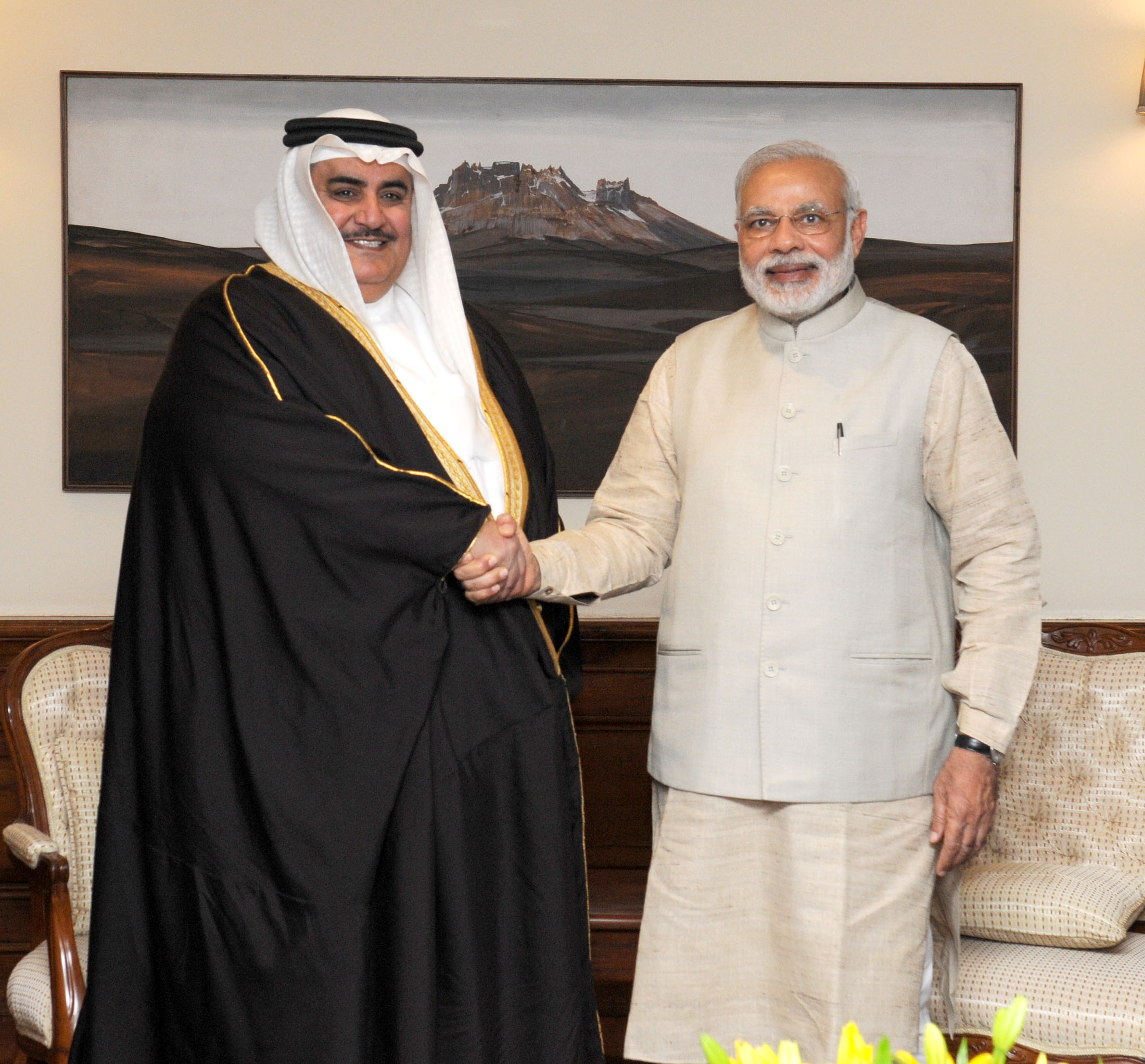
The Bahraini foreign minister with the Prime Minister of India.

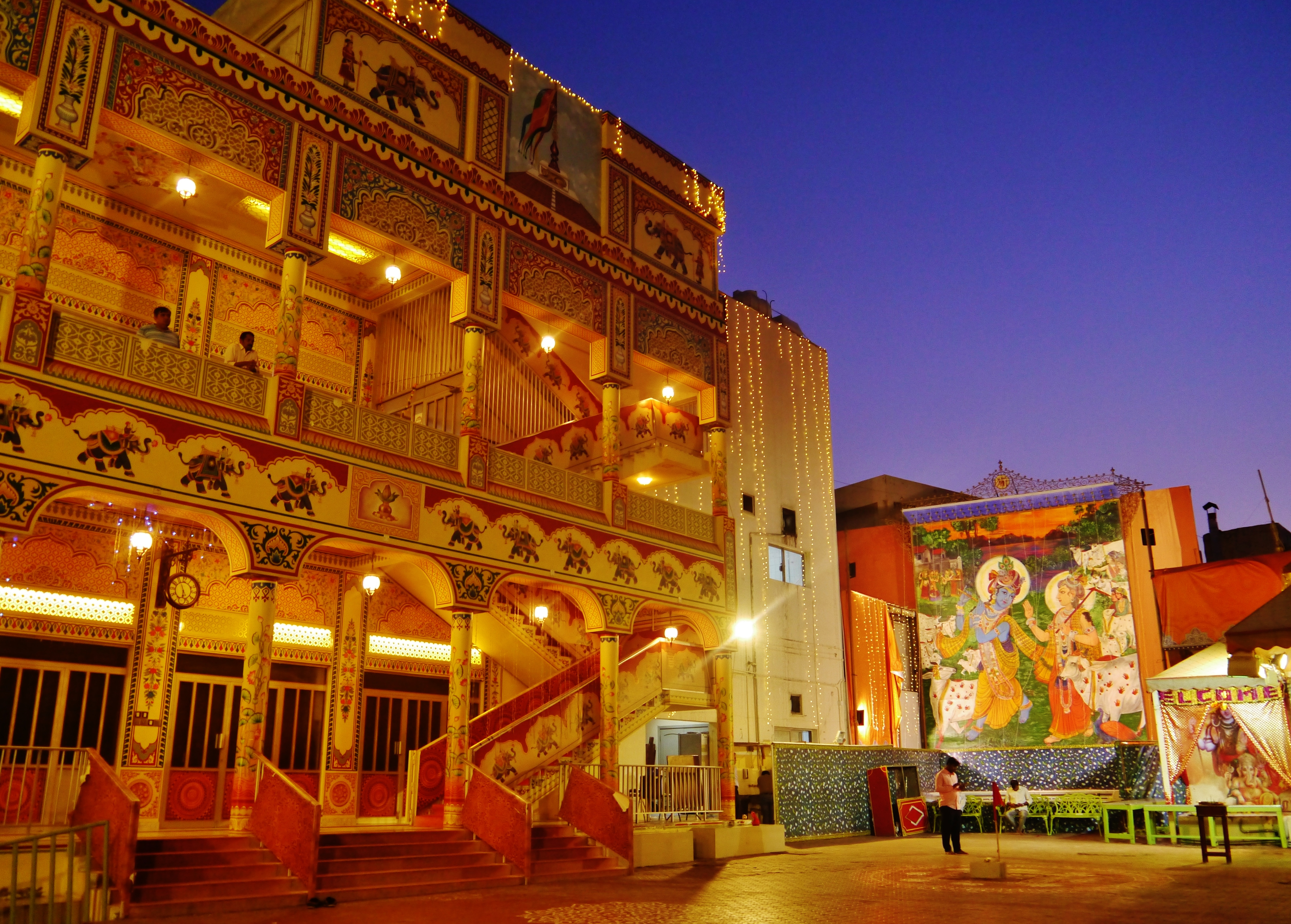
Shrinathji Temple in Manama

Political, socio-economic, military and cultural ties exist between India and Bahrain. Bahrain is a close ally of India. As per Indian officials, the Kingdom along with its GCC partners are amongst the world's most prominent supporters of India's candidacy for a permanent seat on the UN Security Council, and Bahraini officials have urged India to play a greater role in international affairs. For instance, over concerns about Iran's nuclear programme, Bahrain's Crown Prince requested India to play an active role in resolving the crisis.

== History ==
Relations between India and Bahrain go back generations, with many of Bahrain's most prominent figures having close ties: poet and constitutionalist Ebrahim Al-Arrayedh grew up in Bombay, while 17th century Bahraini theologians Sheikh Salih Al-Karzakani and Sheikh Ja`far bin Kamal al-Din were influential figures in the Kingdom of Golkonda and the development of Shia thought in the sub-continent. Mohammed Hasan Kamaluddin was Bahrain's first consul general to India in 1974, serving from the consulate in Mumbai.

== Current status ==
Bahraini politicians have sought to enhance these long standing ties, with Parliamentary Speaker Khalifa Al-Dhahrani in 2007 leading a delegation of parliamentarians and business leaders to meet Indian President Pratibha Patil, opposition leader L K Advani, and take part in training and media interviews. Politically, it is easier for Bahrain's politicians to seek training and advice from India than it is from the United States or other western alternative.

In December 2007, the Bahrain India Society was launched in Manama to promote ties between the two countries. Headed by the former Minister of Labour Abdulnabi Al-Shoala, the Society seeks to take advantage of the development in civil society to actively work to strengthen ties between the two countries, not only business links, but according to the body's opening statement in politics, social affairs, science and culture. India's Minister of State for Foreign Affairs E Ahmed and his Bahraini counterpart Dr Nazar Al-Baharna attended the launch.

According to a United States diplomatic cable dated 4 November 2009, revealed by WikiLeaks during the United States diplomatic cables leak, King Hamad holds a positive view of India and urged the US to use India's help in Afghanistan.

Bahrain's ruler Sheikh Hamad bin Isa Al Khalifa visited India in February 2014 during which the two countries signed a number of MOUs during which US$450 million of bilateral trade and investment were signed. The Prime minister, the President and various ministers from India met and discussed trade and the 350,000+ Indians staying and living on the island. India expressed its support for Bahrain's bid for a non-permanent seat in the Security council in 2026–27.

Indian Prime Minister Narendra Modi visited Bahrain on 24–25 August 2019, the first ever visit by an Indian Prime Minister to the country. India and Bahrain signed 3 MoUs on space, culture, the International Solar Alliance and the RuPay card. King of Bahrain Hamad bin Isa Al Khalifa awarded Modi with the Member 1st Class of the Order of the Renaissance, the country's third highest civilian award, in recognition of his efforts to strengthen bilateral relations. Modi offered prayers at the Shreenathji temple in Manama on 25 August 2019, the oldest temple in the country, and also inaugurated a US$4.2 million project to redevelop the temple complex. On the same day, Bahrain announced that it had issued official pardons to 250 Indian citizens imprisoned in the country.

== See also ==
- Indians in Bahrain
- Hinduism in Oman
