= Bahrain–Pakistan relations =

- Pakistan: Bahrain

Extremely strong and cordial relations exist between Bahrain and Pakistan. Bahrain maintains an embassy in Islamabad and a Consulate-General in Karachi, whilst Pakistan maintains an embassy in Manama. Both countries are members of the OIC and of the G 77.

After the British left, Pakistan originally called for the territory to be merged into with the Trucial States of the United Arab Emirates, with which it had recognized in the same year despite this however diplomatic relations between Bahrain and Pakistan were established in 1971.

== State visits ==
=== 2005 – Prime Minister's Visit ===
Pakistan Prime Minister Shaukat Aziz visited Bahrain and met with Muhammad bin Isa Al Khalifa. Bahrain's Crown Prince Salman bin Hamad bin Isa Al Khalifa during his visit to Pakistan termed Pakistan as his second home and further stated that Pakistan was the country which is held in the highest esteem by the leadership and the people of Bahrain.

=== 2011 – President of Pakistan's Visit ===
President of Pakistan, Asif Ali Zardari, visited the Kingdom of Bahrain and met with King Hamad Bin Isa Al Khalifa. Both leaders agreed to bolster bilateral relations and consolidate cooperation in the economic, trade and political fields, to the benefit of both countries and peoples. King Hamad bin Isa Al-Khalifa and Pakistani President Asif Ali Zardari reaffirmed resolve to boost ties as talks at Al-Safriya Palace on relations of friendship and bilateral cooperation in all fields. They also discussed political developments on both regional and international arenas. HM the King welcomed President Zardari, stressing the importance of the visit in opening up new horizons for more cooperation. The two leaders discussed the political situation, stressing the importance of promoting security and stability towards achieving comprehensive development goals. The two sides agreed to continue their joint coordination and consultation.

=== 2014 – HM King Hamad's visit to Pakistan ===
King Hamad Bin Isa Al Khalifa visited Pakistan and held detailed meetings with the Pakistani leadership, with a view to consolidating and upgrading the relations between both countries. Subsequent to his meetings with Prime Minister Nawaz Sharif, six agreements were signed between both countries, giving a further boost to the bilateral ties.

=== 2015 – Prime Minister Nawaz Sharif's visit to Bahrain ===
Upon the invitation of the King of Bahrain, Prime Minister Nawaz Sharif, visited the Kingdom of Bahrain to hold detailed meetings with the Bahraini leadership. In addition to his meetings with the King, Prime Minister Nawaz Sharif also met with H.R.H. Prince Khalifa bin Salman Al Khalifa, The Prime Minister of the Kingdom of Bahrain and senior royals. Further agreements between both countries were signed paving the way for further strengthening co-operation in all areas of bilateral relations.

== A Growing Relationship ==
The visit of King Hamad Bin Isa Al Khalifa to Pakistan and the return visit by Prime Minister Nawaz Sharif opened a new chapter in the relationship between Pakistan and Kingdom of Bahrain. In view of the various co-operation agreements that were signed between both countries. Soon after the Prime Minister Nawaz Sharif's visit, he appointed his Special Envoy, Javed Malik, as Pakistan's New Ambassador to the Kingdom of Bahrain with a clear mandate to consolidate, strengthen and enhance the ties between both countries with a focus on economic and trade relations.

== First Bilateral Political Consultations in Islamabad ==
In July 2016, Pakistan and Bahrain held their first bilateral consultations at the Ministry of Foreign Affairs in Islamabad, with a view to agreeing a roadmap aimed at expanding and enhancing the relations between both countries.

== See also ==
- Embassy of Pakistan, Manama
- Pakistanis in the Middle East
- Pakistanis in Bahrain
