= Indians in Bahrain =

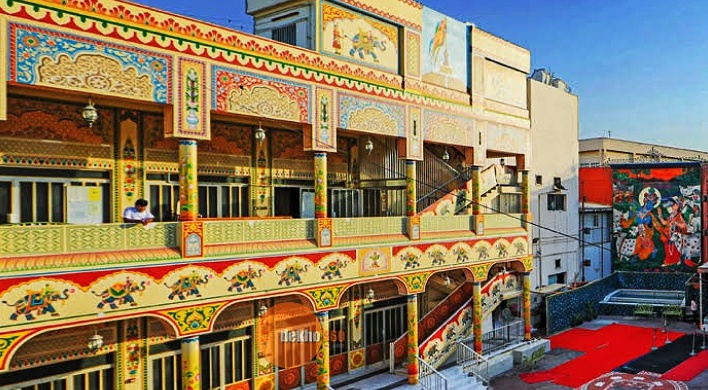
- Shrinathji Temple, Bahrain

Total population
- 350,000

Languages
- Malayalam; Hindi; Gujarati; Marathi; Telugu; Kannada; Punjabi; Tamil; Urdu; Arabic

Religion
- Islam; Roman Catholicism; Syriac Christianity; Protestantism; Hinduism

Related ethnic groups
- Pakistanis in Bahrain

The history of Indians in Bahrain dates back to the time of the Dilmun civilisation in 3000 BCE when the civilisation served as a trade link between Mesopotamia and the Indus Valley civilisation. Proper immigration of Indians to Bahrain first started in the late quarter of the 19th century, with Banyan merchants arriving from British India or also known as British Raj under the jurisdiction of HM Government of the United Kingdom when it was under the rule of the British Empire. Today, there are about 350,000 Indian nationals in Bahrain, making them the largest expatriate group in the country.

== History ==
Initially, Indian merchants in Bahrain traded dates, though most later entered the pearling business and helped to export pearls to the world market. These merchant families originated from the Sindh province and the Kathiawad region of Gujarat. By 1925, it was estimated that there were 2,500 Indian families settled in the country, most of whom were involved in the retail sector. With the discovery and refinement of oil in Bahrain in 1932–1945, there was a demand for manpower in the oil sector, which led to greater number of Indian workers to immigrate to the country. Following the Second World War and the subsequent expansion of Bahrain's economy as a result of the oil boom, greater number of Indians emigrated to the country to set up their own businesses and to fill in manpower demands as workers, managers and salesmen. By the 1950s, the Bahrain Petroleum Company, which was the country's sole oil company, had employed more than 600 Indians. A rough estimate suggested that the number of migrant workers, from the state of Kerala, in Bahrain increased from 1,000 in 1958 to almost 5,000 in 1981. This figure has increased to 101,556 in 2011, forming the majority of Indian nationals in the country.

Indians in the country have predominantly blue-collar jobs; 70% of the Indian community work in the construction sector of the country, with others working as barbers and carpenters. Around 15,000 more Indians work as domestic workers; these are almost exclusively women. Most Indian women in the country work as teachers in the country's private schools. Despite the vast number of Indians working as blue-collar workers, white-collar Indian workers are present in the country, often working as pharmacists, physicians and accountants.

The Indian embassy in the country was first opened in January 1973. Prior to that, India's Ambassador to Kuwait was concurrently accredited to Bahrain.

== Culture ==
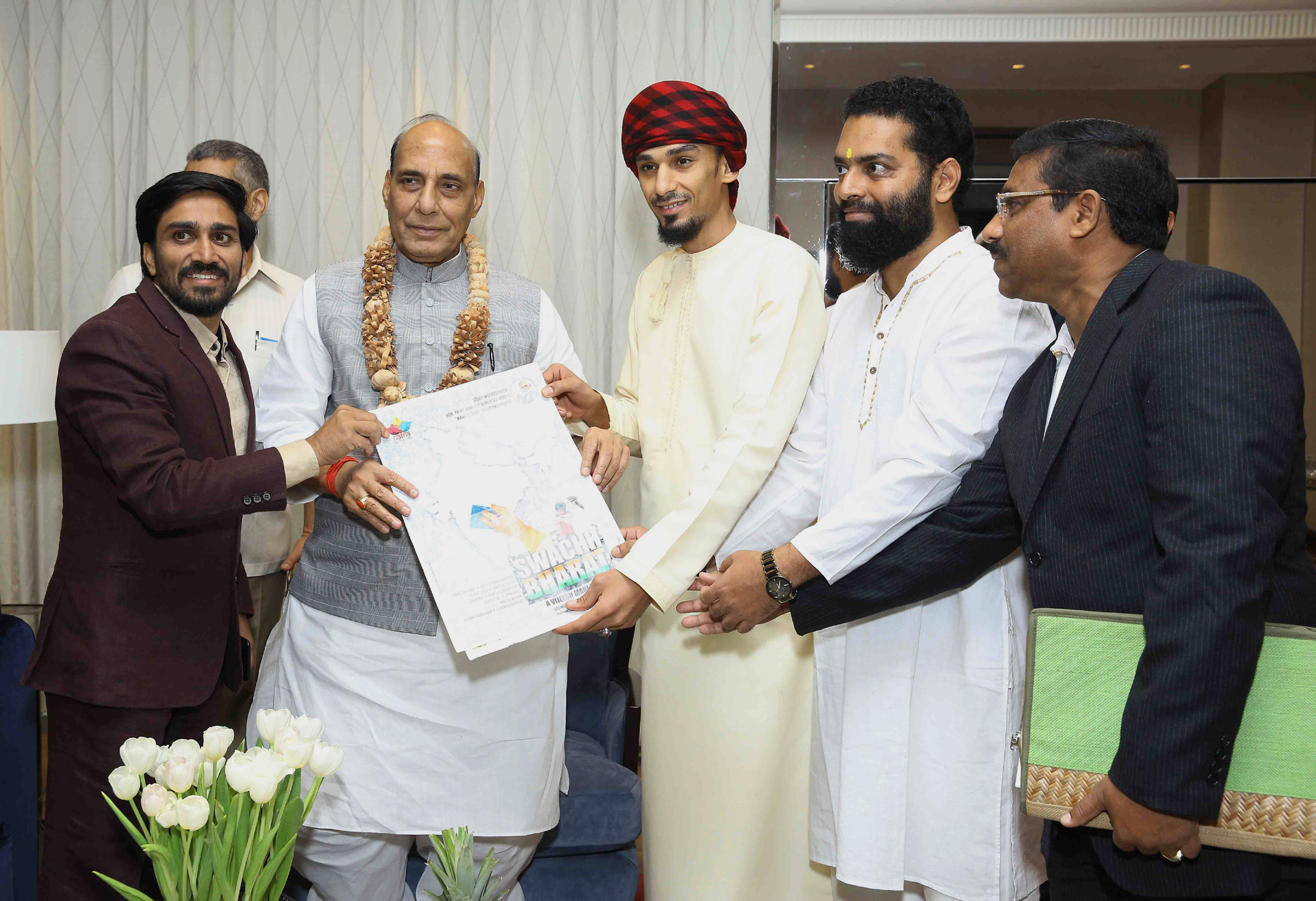
A delegation of Indian community in Bahrain, calling on the Union Home Minister, Shri Rajnath Singh, in Manama on October 25, 2016

There are 32 registered Indian cultural organisations, with a further 68 unregistered socio-cultural organisations and clubs. There are multiple non-Muslim religious places of worship present in the country including a 200-year-old Shrinathji temple, five churches and six Gurudwaras. The country's oldest and largest Indian social club is the Indian Club with over 4,000 members. The club was first established in 1915 as the Bahrain Sports Club to serve the country's native and non-native inhabitants. The Bahrain Keraleeya Samajam was established in 1947. Many of the Indian associations are under the umbrella group of the Co-ordination Committee of Indian Associations (CCIA), which coordinates events for the Indian community such as the Indian Republic Day. The CCIA also helped to provide relief for Indian workers in tragedies such as the Bahrain boat disaster, which killed 17 Indians.

=== Education ===
There are multiple schools that were established in the country in the 20th century that offer the CBSE curriculum, the oldest of which is The Indian School which was first established in 1950. The list of CBSE curriculum schools in Bahrain are:-

- Al-Noor International School
- Asian School
- Ibn Al-Hytham Islamic School
- New Horizon School
- New Millennium School
- British School of Bahrain
- Indian School, Bahrain
- Bahrain Indian School (Bharatiya Vidya Bhavan)
- The New Indian School (http://www.thenewindianschoolbh.org/school-profile.html)

== See also ==
- Bahrain–India relations
- City of Strangers: Gulf Migration and the Indian Community in Bahrain
