= Bahria College Islamabad =

College in Islamabad, Pakistan

- بحریہ کالج اسلام آباد
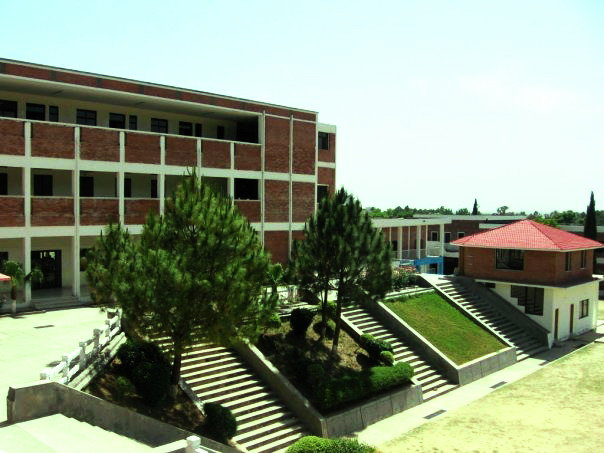
- Other name: BCI
- Established: 30 August 1986; 39 years ago
- Founder: Pakistan Navy
- Academic affiliations: CIE, FBISE
- Principal: Commodore Ameer Rashid Malik SI(M)
- Location: Lalak Jan Road and Bahria Road Naval Complex, E-8, Naval Anchorage, Islamabad, Islamabad Capital Territory, Pakistan; 33°43′15″N 73°02′00″E
- Campus: Urban
- Language: English
- Website: bahrian.edu.pk

Bahria College Islamabad (Urdu: بحریہ کالج اسلام آباد) is a school located in Islamabad, Pakistan. Its foundation stone was laid by the Chief of Naval Staff Admiral Iftikhar Ahmed Sirohey on 30 August 1986 under the supervision of Pakistan Navy.

== Campus ==
The campus of the college is located in the heart of the capital city facing the panoramic Margalla Hills, located in Sector E-8, Naval Complex, Islamabad, Pakistan.

== Administration ==
It provides education to students from kindergarten up to the HSSC/A-level. It has three wings: each run by a vice-principal:

- the Montessori section
- the Primary section
- the Secondary section (the Boys wing, the Girls wing and the Cambridge wing).

The college is administered by Pakistan Navy and important decisions and orders are made under the supervision of Commander North and Naval Headquarters.

The college has its own annually published magazine called the Shanawar.

== Notable alumni ==
- Javed Malik (Pakistan's Ambassador to the Kingdom of Bahrain)
- Osman Khalid Butt (Pakistani actor)
- Abdullah Qureshi (Pakistani singer)
- Usman Mukhtar (Pakistani actor)
- Mawra Hocane (Pakistani actress)
- Urwa Hocane (Pakistani actress)
