= Pakistanis in Bahrain =

Total population
- 110,000 (2014) including 10,000 serving in security forces.

Regions with significant populations
- Manama

Languages
- Urdu, Punjabi, Pashto, Gulf Arabic, Saraiki, Balushi

Religion
- Sunni Islam and Christianity

Related ethnic groups
- Indians in Bahrain

Pakistanis in Bahrain comprise Pakistani people living as expatriates or immigrants in Bahrain and their locally born descendants. The Overseas Pakistanis Foundation estimates that the population of Pakistanis in Bahrain stands at 110,000 as of 31 December 2014. The Pakistani community maintains two schools, the Pakistan School, Bahrain (managed by a parents-elected board, with the Ambassador of the Islamic Republic of Pakistan as the patron-in-chief) and Pakistan Urdu School which educates community youth.

For the welfare of the Pakistani community in Bahrain, the Pakistan Club has been established in Manama, which holds numerous events such as Iftar Nights and National Day celebrations.

== Profession and integration ==
The British Army in the past sent its most reliable force from Punjab and India to Bahrain. The presence of Pakistanis in Bahrain dates back to 1950. Bahrain is the first Arab country to grant citizenship to people who had served its country. A Pakistani can be granted citizenship after working for the government for 25 years. Up to 30,000 Pakistanis are thought to have obtained Bahraini citizenship.

== Service in Bahrain ==
The majority of Pakistanis work in the Public Security Forces and the Bahrain Defence Force to help provide security for Bahrain. Protests have seen many Pakistanis injured by mobs.

The Pakistan army affiliated Fauji Foundation and Pakistan navy affiliated Bahria Foundation have also been recruiting Pakistani military personnel for the Bahrain National Guard. Following the 2011 Bahraini protests, advertisements for additional 800-1,000 recruits had been advertised in Pakistani newspapers. This is in addition to a conservative estimate of 2,000 Pakistanis already serving in Bahrain Defence Force and Public Security Force. According to an estimate by the Wall Street Journal, Pakistanis contribute as many as 7,000 of the 25,000-strong Bahrain police force. In total, almost 10,000 Pakistanis contribute to various Bahrain security forces. The Pakistan army and Bahrain National Guard are also known to maintain strong ties.

== Education ==
1. Pakistan Urdu School educates Pakistanis in Bahrain. http://www.pakurduschool.com/ 2. Pakistan school Bahrain (https://pakistanschool.org/)

== Notable people ==
- Salah Abdul Rasool Al Blooshi – former Guantanamo prisoner
- Adil Hanif – athlete
- Mohammed Khalid – former MP

== See also ==
- Bahrain–Pakistan relations
- Embassy of Pakistan, Manama
