= Agriculture in Bahrain =

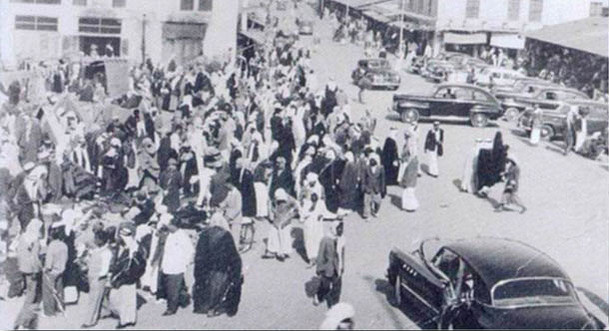
Vegetable market in Bahrain, circa 1930s.

Despite the low rainfall and poor soil, agriculture in Bahrain historically was an important sector of the economy. Before the development of the oil industry, date palm cultivation dominated Bahrain's agriculture, producing sufficient dates for both domestic consumption and export. At least twenty-three varieties of dates are grown, and the leaves, branches, buds, and flowers of the date palm also are used extensively. From the 1950s through the 1970s, changing food consumption habits, as well as the increasing salinity of the aquifers that served as irrigation sources, led to a gradual decline in date cultivation. By the 1980s, a significant number of palm groves had been replaced by new kinds of agricultural activities, including vegetable gardens, nurseries for trees and flowers, poultry production, and dairy farms.

== Land Distribution ==
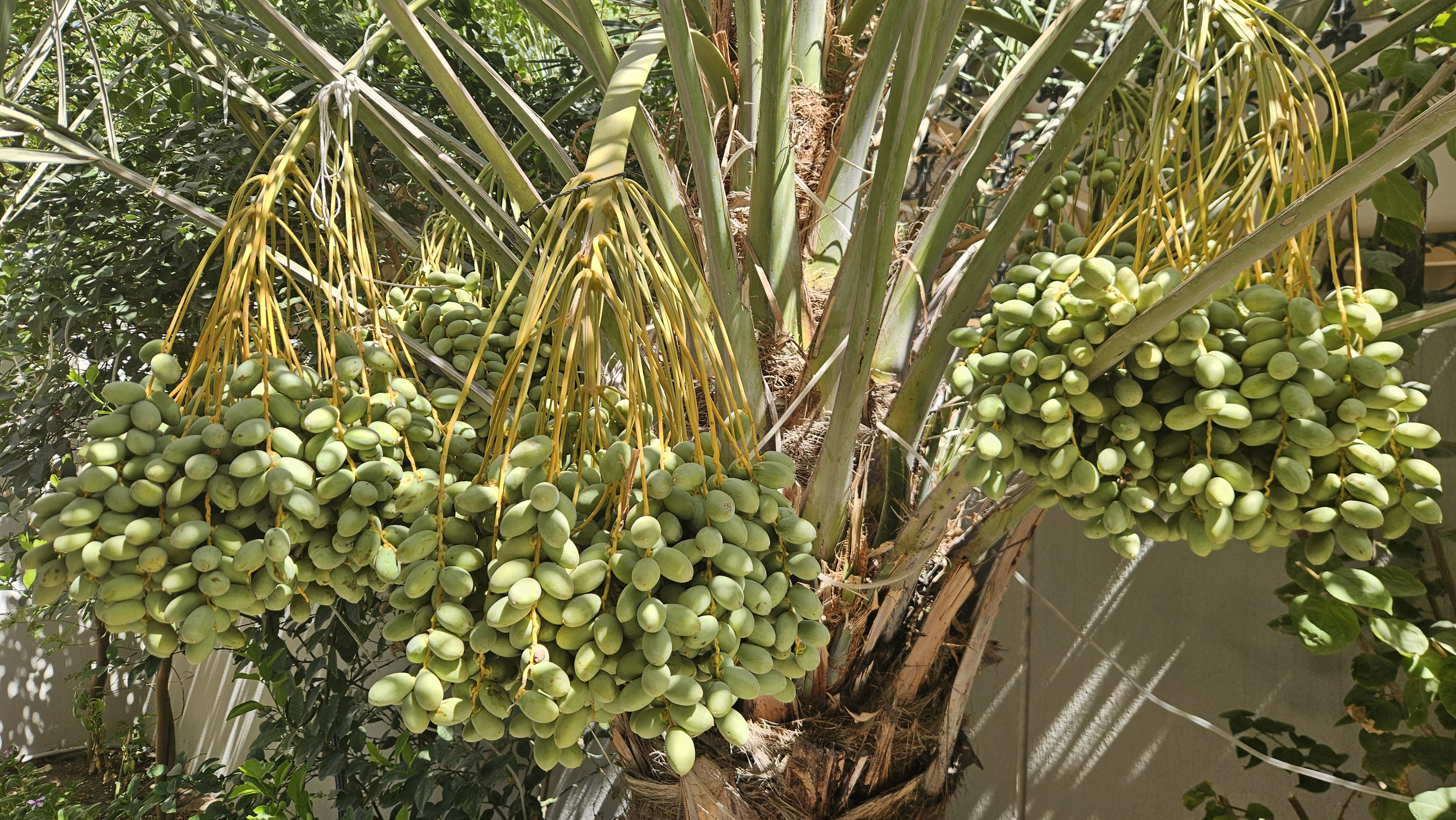
Unripe dates growing on a palm tree in Bahrain

Bahrain's cultivated area had been reduced from 6,000 hectares (15,000 acres) before independence to 1,500 hectares (3,700 acres). The cultivated land consists of about 10,000 plots ranging in size from a few square meters to 4 hectares (9.9 acres). These plots are distributed among approximately 800 owners. A minority of large owners, including individuals and institutions, are absentee landlords who control about 60 percent of all cultivable land. The ruling Al Khalifa own the greatest number of plots, including the largest and most productive ones, although public information pertaining to the distribution of ownership among family members was not available as of 1994. Absentee owners rent their plots to farmers, generally on the basis of three-year contracts. There are approximately 2,400 farmers, 70 percent of whom do not own the land they cultivate.

== Vice-versa ==
The small size of most plots and the maldistribution of ownership has tended to discourage private investment in agriculture. In addition, the number of skilled farmworkers progressively declined after 1975 because an increasing number of villagers obtained high-paying, non-agricultural jobs. Despite these impediments, official government policy since 1980 has aimed at expanding domestic production of crops through such programs as free distribution of seeds, technical assistance in adopting new and more efficient irrigation technologies, and low interest credit. Although these programs have contributed to significant increases in the production of eggs, milk, and vegetables, the circumscribed extent of Bahrain's cultivable area limits the island's potential productive capacity. Consequently, agricultural imports remain a permanent aspect of the country's international trade. In 1993 the main food imports included fruits, vegetables, meat, live animals, cereals, and dairy products.

== See also ==
- Fishing and pearling in Bahrain
