= Javed Malik =

Pakistani diplomat

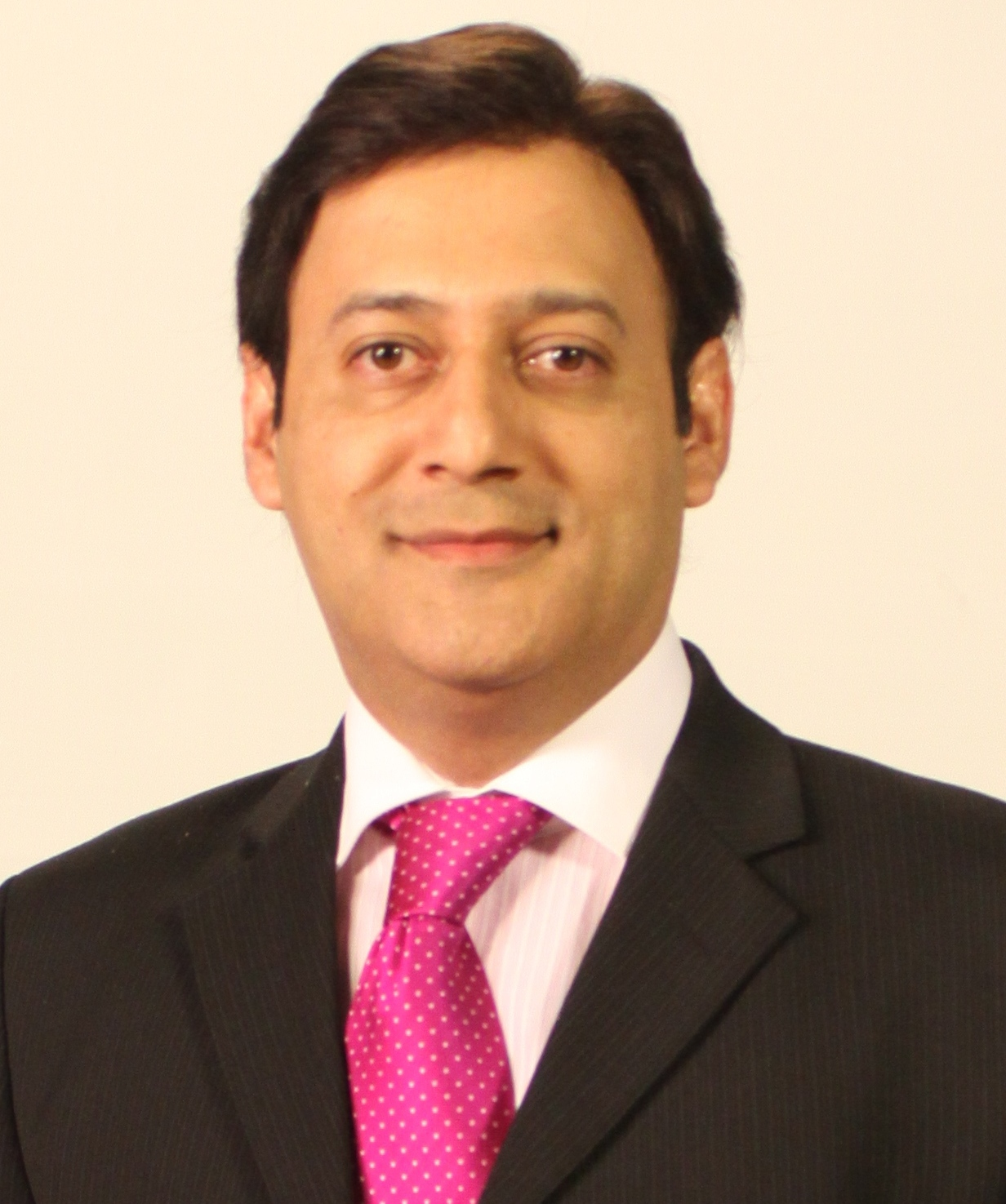

Prime Minister's Special Envoy
- Incumbent
- Assumed office 20 December 2013
- President: Mamnoon Hussain
- Prime Minister: Nawaz Sharif

Pakistan's Ambassador to Bahrain
- Incumbent
- Assumed office 31 December 2015
- President: Mamnoon Hussain
- Prime Minister: Nawaz Sharif

Pakistan's Ambassador at Large
- In office 25 July 2008 – 22 November 2010

Personal details
- Born: Islamabad, Pakistan
- Education: Froebel's International School, Bahria College, Middlesex University
- Profession: Diplomat, Journalist, Media Personality

Javed Malik is a diplomat, noted media personality and the President of the Diplomat Business Club based in London and Dubai. Malik served as Pakistan's Ambassador to the Kingdom of Bahrain between 2015 and 2018, and the Prime Minister's Special Envoy for Trade and Investment between 2013 and 2018. Earlier, Malik also served as Pakistan's Ambassador at Large for Overseas Pakistanis between 2008 and 2011. Currently he is the President of International Diplomat Forum based out of London, Dubai and Islamabad.

== Career ==
=== Diplomat Business Club ===
Malik is the current president of the Diplomat Business Club, an international trade and economic diplomacy forum that connects business and corporate leaders to explore trade and investment opportunities. He is also the regional director MENA of the Ambassador Partnership LLP.

=== Ambassador to the Kingdom of Bahrain ===
In 2016, Javed Malik was appointed as Pakistan's Ambassador to the Kingdom of Bahrain.

He presented his credentials to His Majesty King Hamad Al Khalifa in March 2016, and during his tenure the relations between Pakistan and Bahrain were upgraded to a Joint Ministerial Commission which held its first session in December 2016 under the co-chairmanship of Bahrain’s Foreign Minister Sheikh Khalid Bin Ahmad Al Khalifa and Pakistan’s Foreign Minister Sartaj Aziz. The Commission agreed a roadmap to expand the diplomatic, political, trade, economic, people to people and cultural ties between both countries. This was followed by the Pakistan Bahrain Business Opportunities Conferences both in Pakistan and Bahrain led by the Commerce Ministers and Presidents of Chambers of Commerce of both countries.

In the same year, An MOU to establish the King Hamad University in Islamabad was also signed during Javed Malik’s tenure, which serves as a symbol of the strong bonds of friendship between Pakistan and Bahrain.

=== Prime Minister's Special Envoy for Trade & Investment ===
In 2013, Javed Malik was appointed as Pakistan's Special Envoy to the GCC. with the rank of an Ambassador by the Prime Minister and given the mandate to promote business, trade and investment opportunities in Pakistan. In this capacity, he initiated a series of activities andmencouraged international investors to visit Pakistan and organised a number of seminars and conferences to highlight trade and investment opportunities in Pakistan.

=== Pakistan's Ambassador at Large ===
In 2008, the Prime Minister of Pakistan appointed Javed Malik as Pakistan's Ambassador at Large with the status of a minister.

In this capacity, he advised and assisted the Prime Minister on issues relating to Overseas Pakistanis. He established the Overseas Pakistanis forum, which held its first session in the UAE, and he also organized the Friends of Pakistan Conference in Islamabad in which UK Parliamentarians also took part.

== Media ==
Malik has a noted background in print and television media since 1999 as a prominent political and international affairs analyst and television host. He began his television career in London with Prime TV and later with ARY News, where he hosted, "Insight" - A Current Affairs talk show for more than ten years. He is also associated with Geo News / Jang Group and writes for their publications, The News International and Daily Jang. He also writes for the Middle East publication, Khaleej Times. and continues to appear on various television shows as an international affairs analyst.

== See also ==
- List of Pakistani journalists
- Pakistan Federal Union of Journalists
