= Embassy of Pakistan, Manama =

Embassy of Pakistan, Kingdom of Bahrain
- Location: Manama, Bahrain
- Address: Building No. 35, Road No. 1901, Block No. 319, Hoora, PO. Box 563
- Ambassador: Muhammad Ayub
- Website: Embassy of Pakistan, Manama

The Embassy of Pakistan, Kingdom of Bahrain is the diplomatic mission of Pakistan to the Kingdom of Bahrain. The embassy is located in the Diplomatic Area in Manama and as of April 2021 was headed by Ambassador Muhammad Ayub.

== Consular services ==
The embassy diplomatically represents Pakistani interests in Bahrain, and provides services to Pakistani expatriates in the country, numbering over 80,000. Key consular services provided include visa provisions, passport services, document attestation, national identity card and citizenship documentation, and other paperwork. A Community Welfare Wing, NICOP/POC Wing and Trade Wing are part of the embassy's functions. The mission operates from Sunday to Thursday, and remains closed on Fridays and Saturdays. The ambassador is assisted by a counselor, Head of Chancery, and a team of other supporting embassy staff.

== See also ==
- Bahrain–Pakistan relations
- List of diplomatic missions of Pakistan
- List of diplomatic missions in Bahrain
