= Fishing industry in Bahrain =

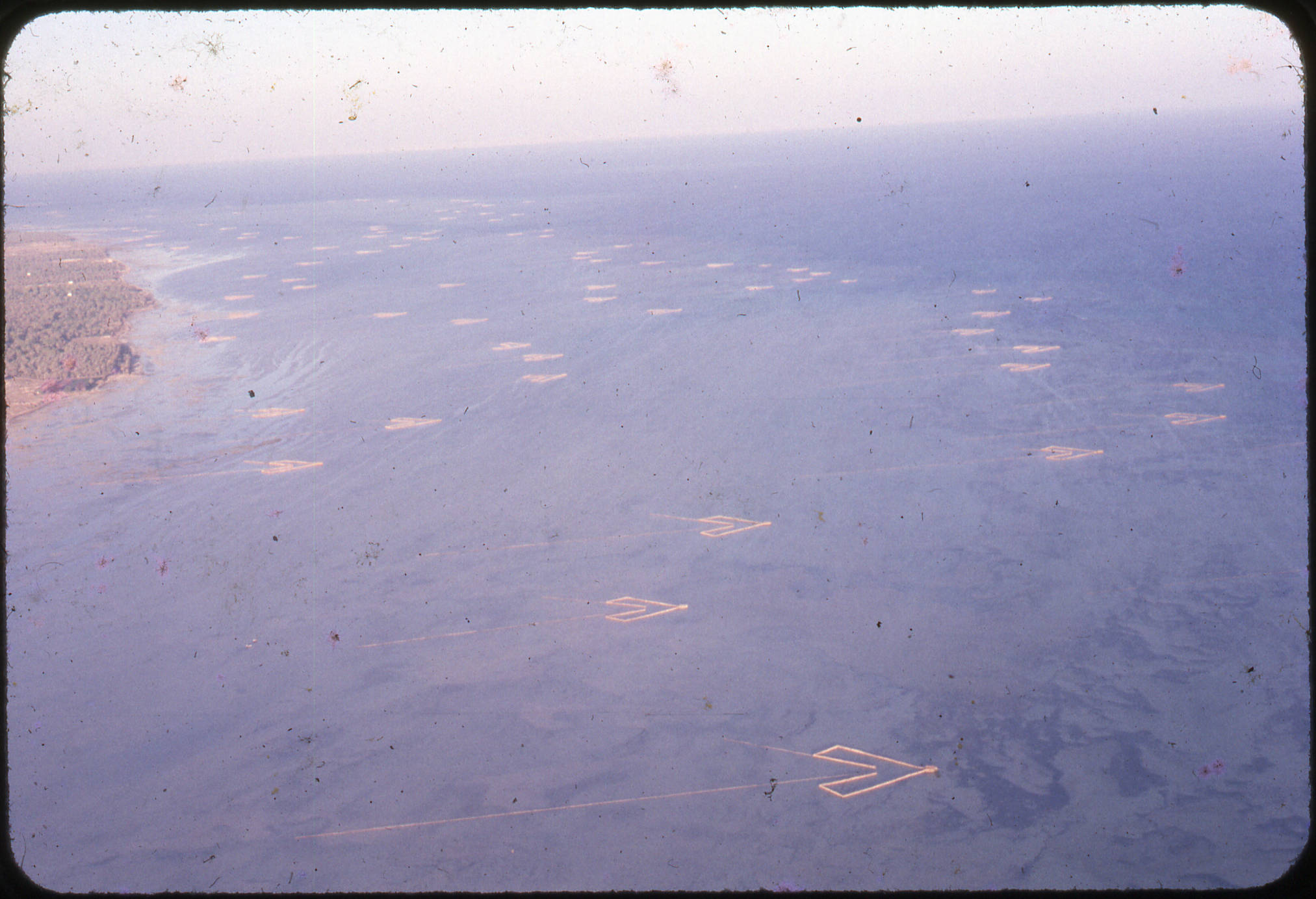
Fish traps in Bahrain, 1961.

The waters surrounding Bahrain traditionally have been rich in more than 200 varieties of fish, many of which constitute a staple of the diet. Before the development of the oil industry, most males engaged in some form of fishing. In addition, the pearl industry constituted one of the most important bases of the island's wealth, and more than 2,000 pearling boats operated during the late 1920s. After 1935 both fishing and pearling as occupations steadily declined. Although the prospect of steady wages attracted many pearl divers to oil-related jobs, pearling was even more adversely affected by the development in Japan of the cultured pearl. By 1953 only twelve pearling boats remained, and these all disappeared within a decade. Fishing declined more gradually, but by the early 1970s fewer than 1,000 fishermen continued to ply their trade. Fewer fishermen meant less fish available in the market despite rising consumer demand, and this situation led to the annual importation of tons of fish to supplement the local catch. In 1981 the government launched a program to revitalize the fishing industry by introducing trawlers, motorizing the traditional dhows, expanding jetties, constructing cold storage facilities, and offering training courses on the use and maintenance of modern fishing equipment. These initiatives contributed to an increase in the total fish catch, which according to estimates of the Food and Agriculture Organization of the United Nations, was 9,200 tons in 1989.

== Pollution ==
Pollution in the Persian Gulf became a problem in the 1970s. Shrimp in the northern gulf seemed particularly sensitive to marine pollution, and by 1979 they had almost disappeared from waters near Bahrain. Pollution was seriously aggravated in 1983 and again in 1991 by major oil slicks which emanated from war-damaged oil facilities and covered several thousand square kilometers of water in the northern Persian Gulf. The slicks were detrimental to the unique marine life in the vicinity of Bahrain, including coral reefs, sea turtles, dugongs (herbivorous sea mammals similar to manatees), oyster beds, numerous fish species, and water fowl. The oil slicks, especially those of 1991, adversely affected the fishing industry, but as of early 1993, marine biologists remained uncertain about the long-term ecological impact of the pollution.

== See also ==
- Agriculture in Bahrain
- Land reclamation in Bahrain
