= Thattai Bhatia =

Clan in Sindh, India

Thattai Bhatia is a clan of Sindhi Bhatia Rajputs which was once settled in Sindh, in what is now Pakistan, but dispersed around the time of the Partition of India in 1947. The Thattai Sindhi Bhatia community derives its name from the Thatta city of Sindh. Pre-independence, in 1880s the Bhatias were considered amongst the top three Indian communities undertaking trading relations with Middle East countries like Bahrain, Qatar, Oman and whole of Gulf. Sindhi Bhatias were dominant in Muscat, Doha and Bandar Abbas.
