= Shrinathji Temple, Bahrain =

Hindu temple in Bahrain

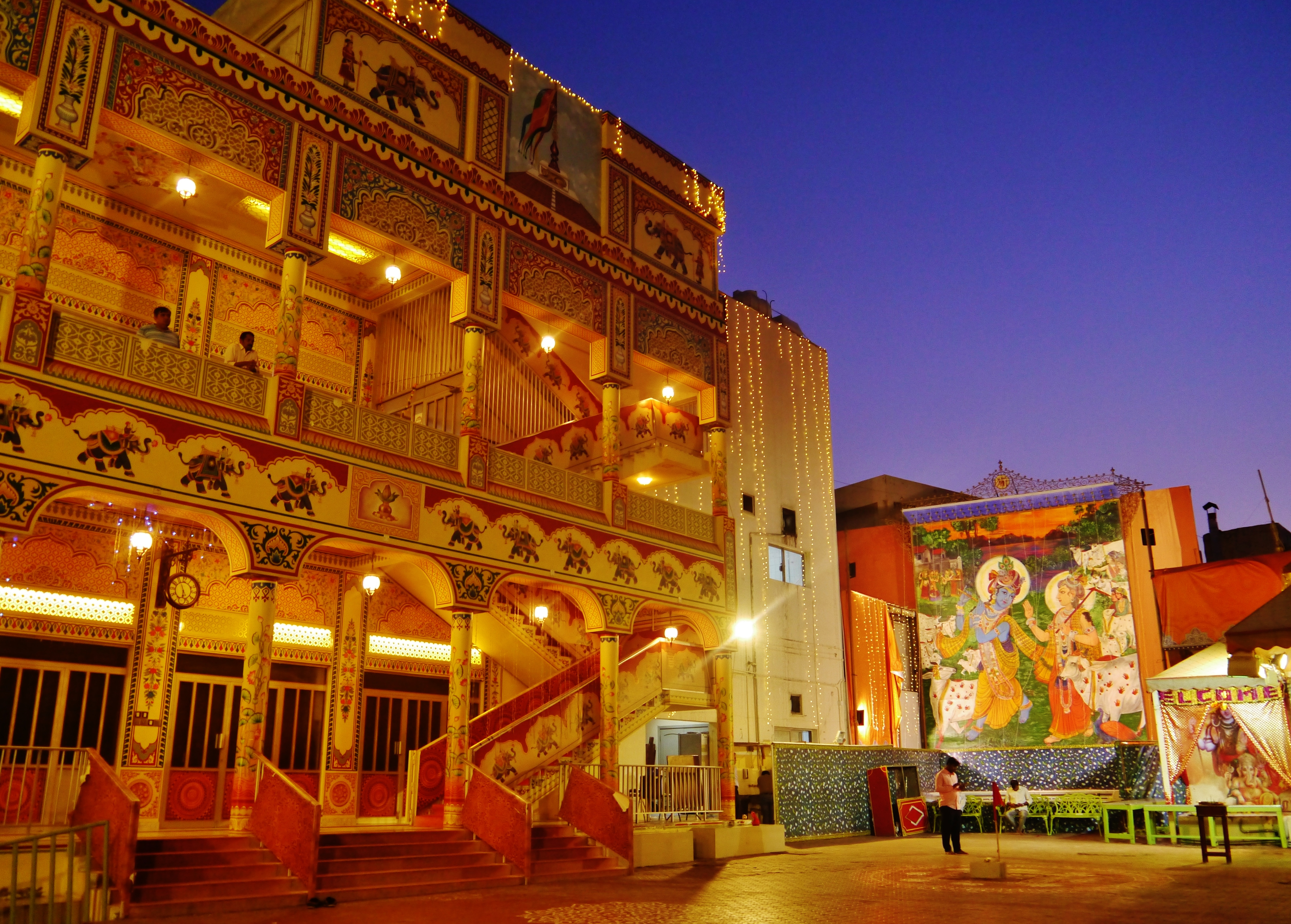
- Shrinathji Temple, Manama

- Location within Bahrain Location within Asia

Religion
- Affiliation: Hinduism
- Deity: Shrinathji (a form of Krishna, manifested as a seven-year-old child)
- Festivals: Janmastami, Diwali
- Governing body: Thattai Hindu community

Location
- Location: Manama
- State: Capital Governorate
- Country: Bahrain
- Interactive map of Shrinathji Temple, Bahrain
- Coordinates: 26°13′54.4″N 50°34′38.8″E

Architecture
- Type: Hindu Temple
- Creator: Thattai Hindu community (Sindh)
- Completed: 1817

Shrinathji Temple is a heritage Hindu temple in Manama established in the year 1817. The temple is dedicated to Lord Shrinathji, a form of Krishna, manifested as a seven-year-old child. The temple is located in Bahrain's capital city of Manama.

== History ==
The temple was constructed in 1817 by the Thattai Bhatia Hindu community, who had migrated from Sindh before the partition of India.

== Key visitors ==
In 2019, the Indian prime minister Narendra Modi visited the temple and launched $4.2 million renovation plan for the temple.

== Gallery ==
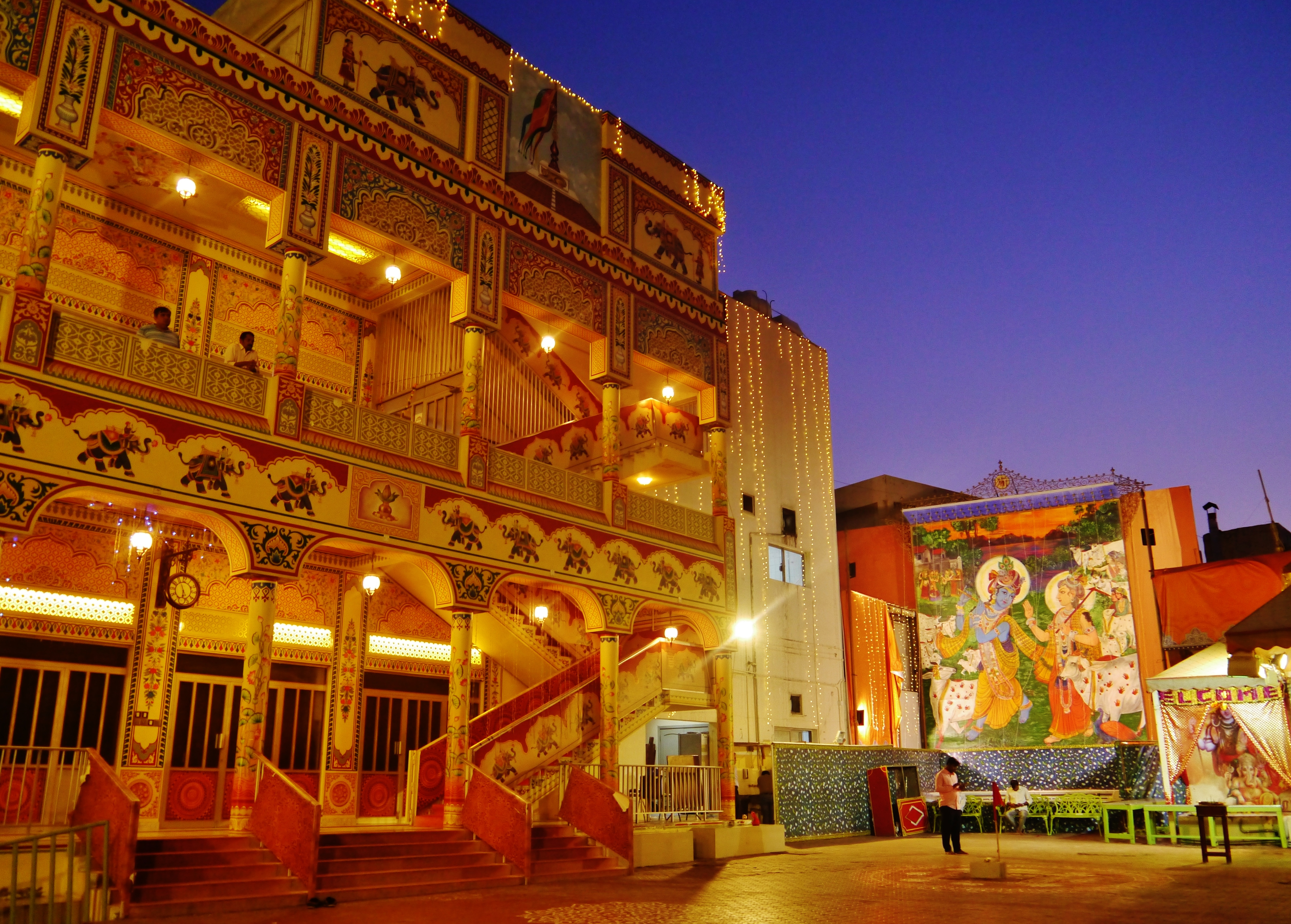
Shrinathji Temple building

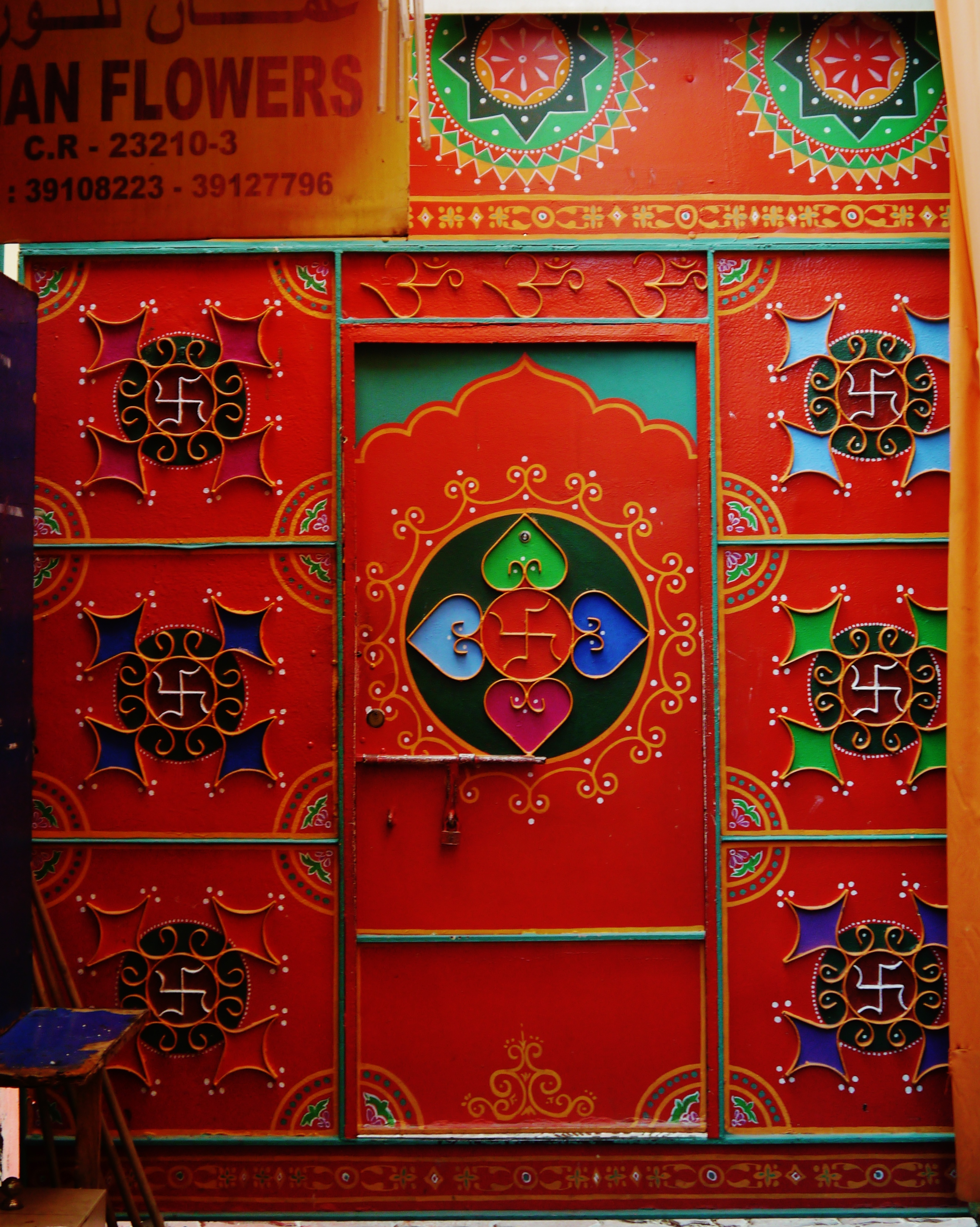
Temple door

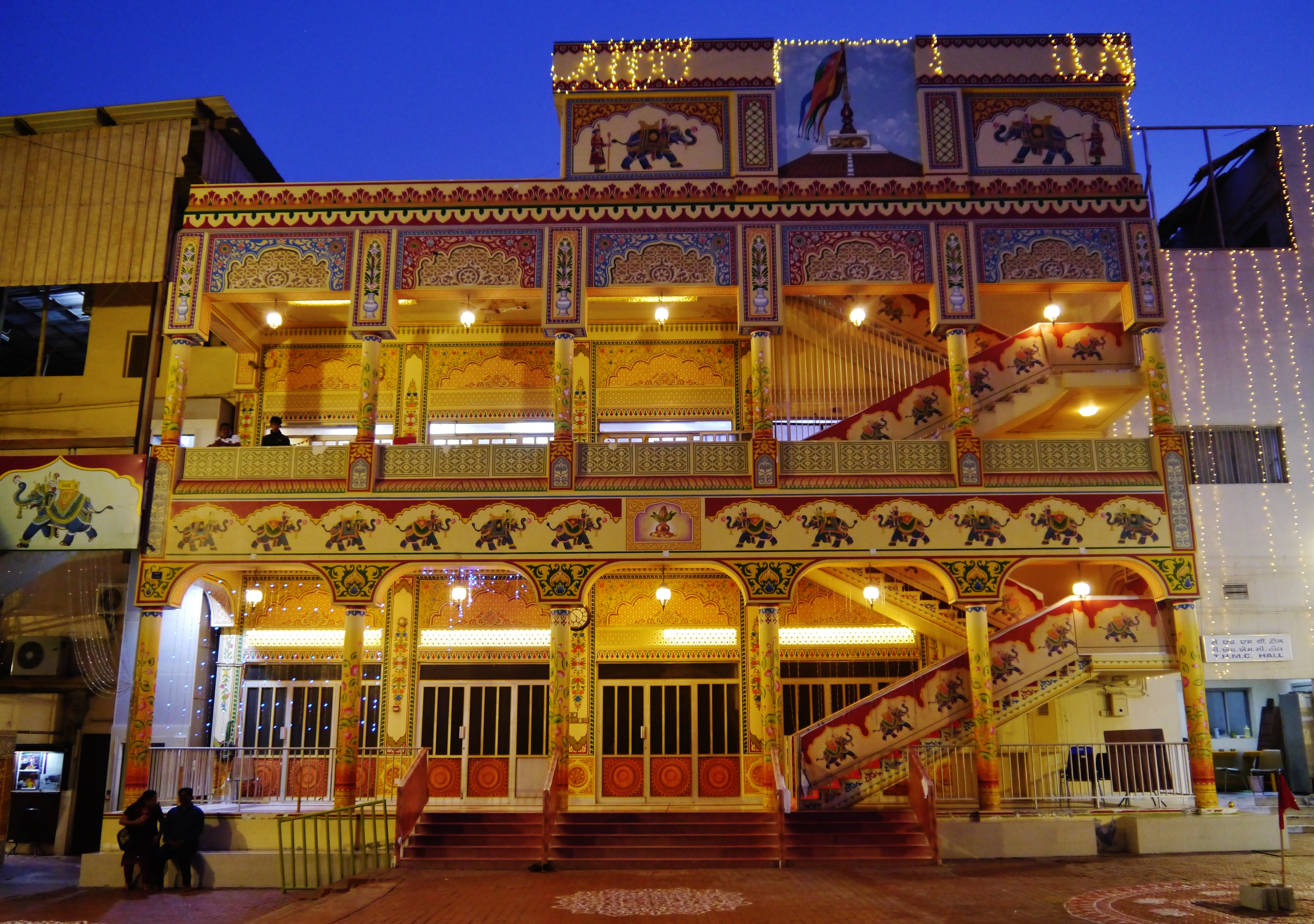
Two level building

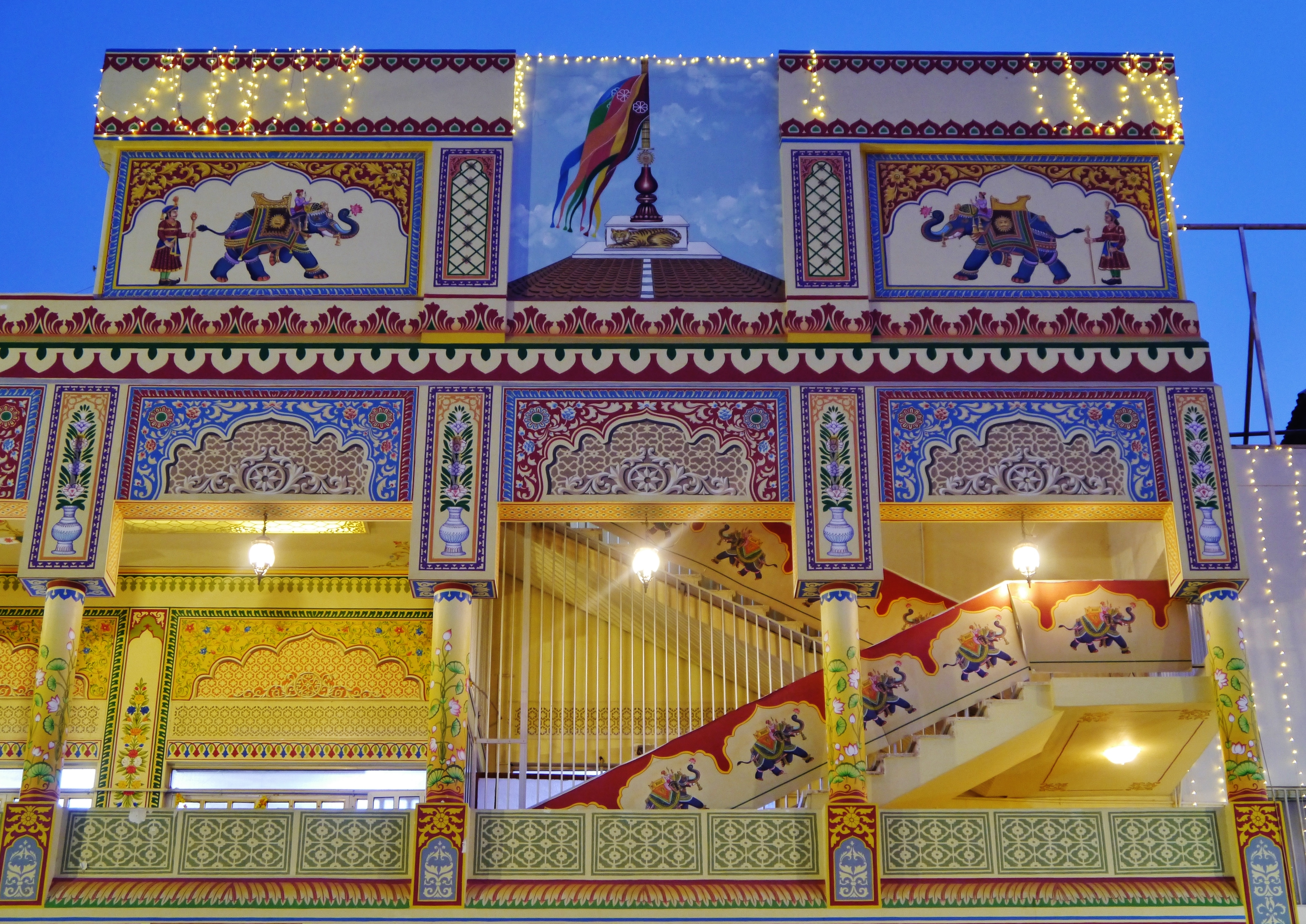
Intricate floral and grill work

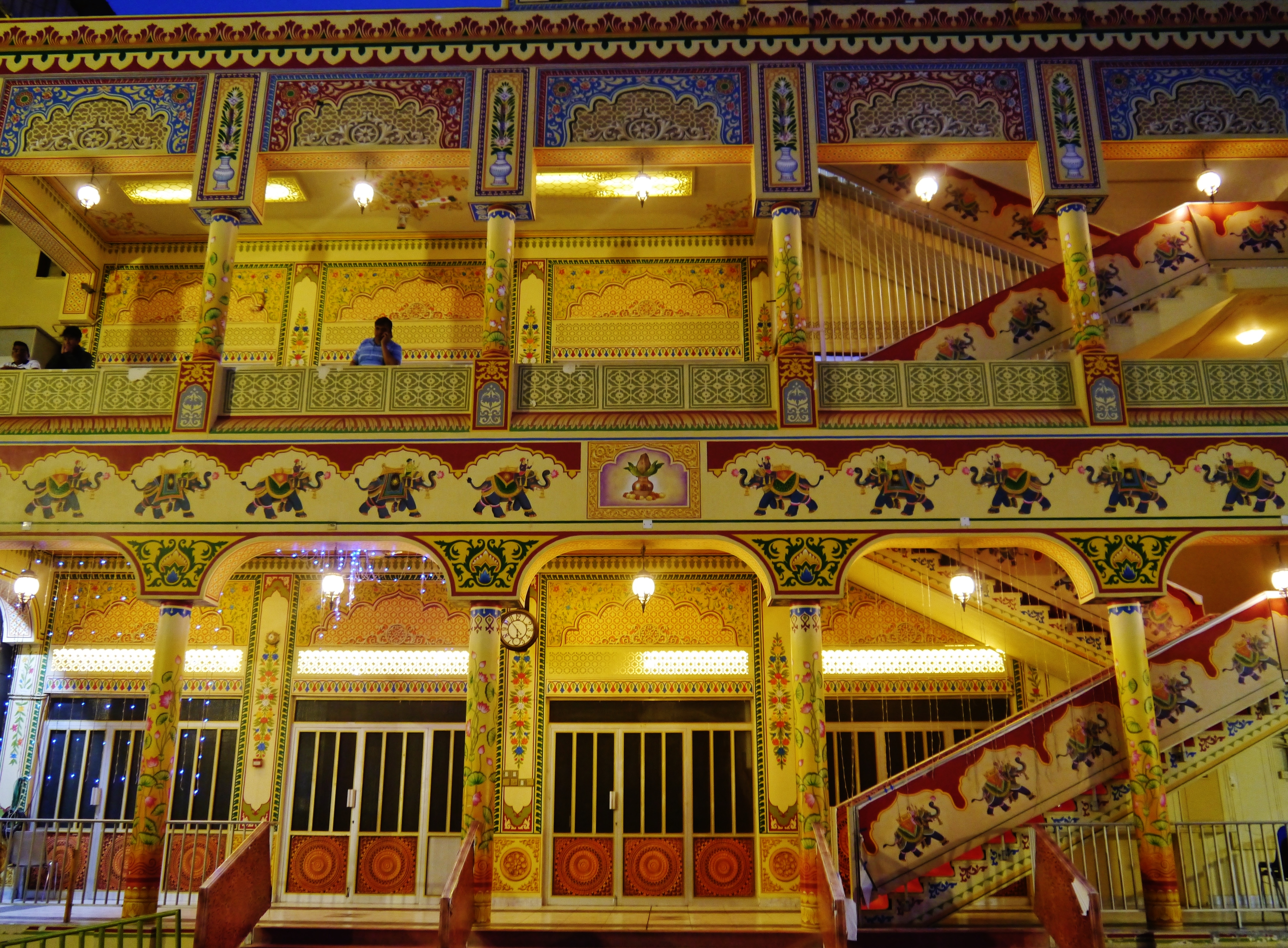
Caparisoned elephants and a Kalash

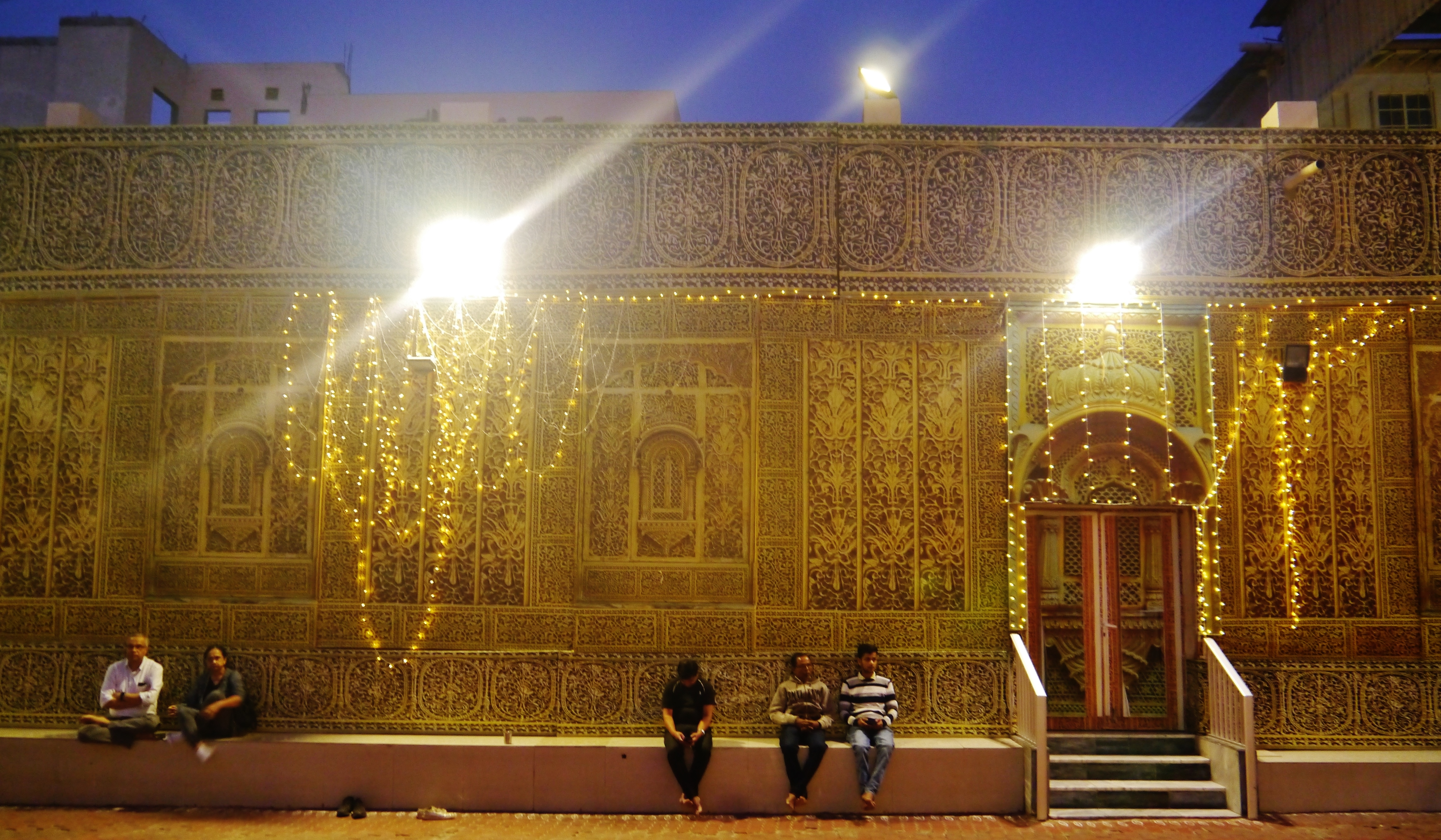
Sitting area

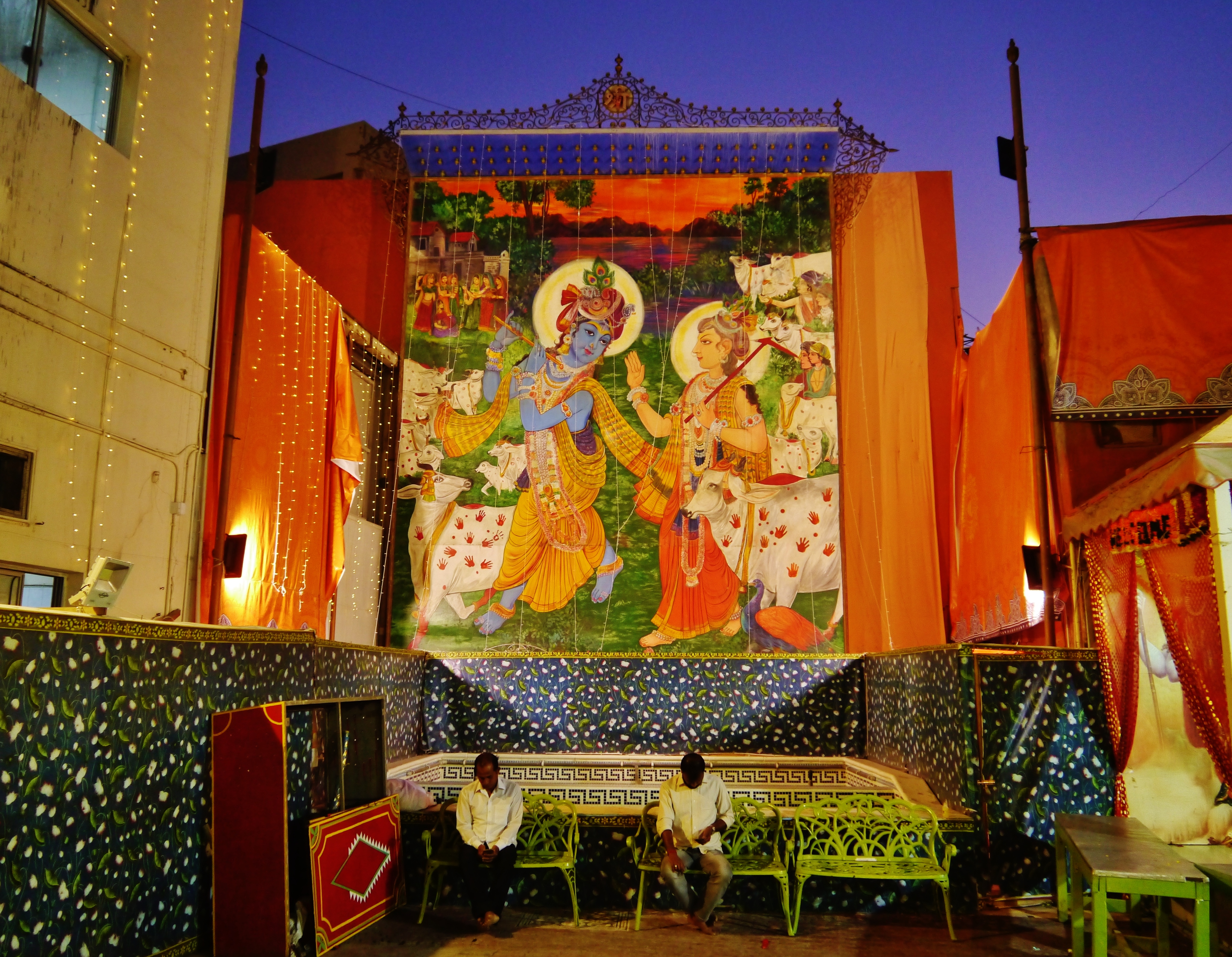
Temple courtyard

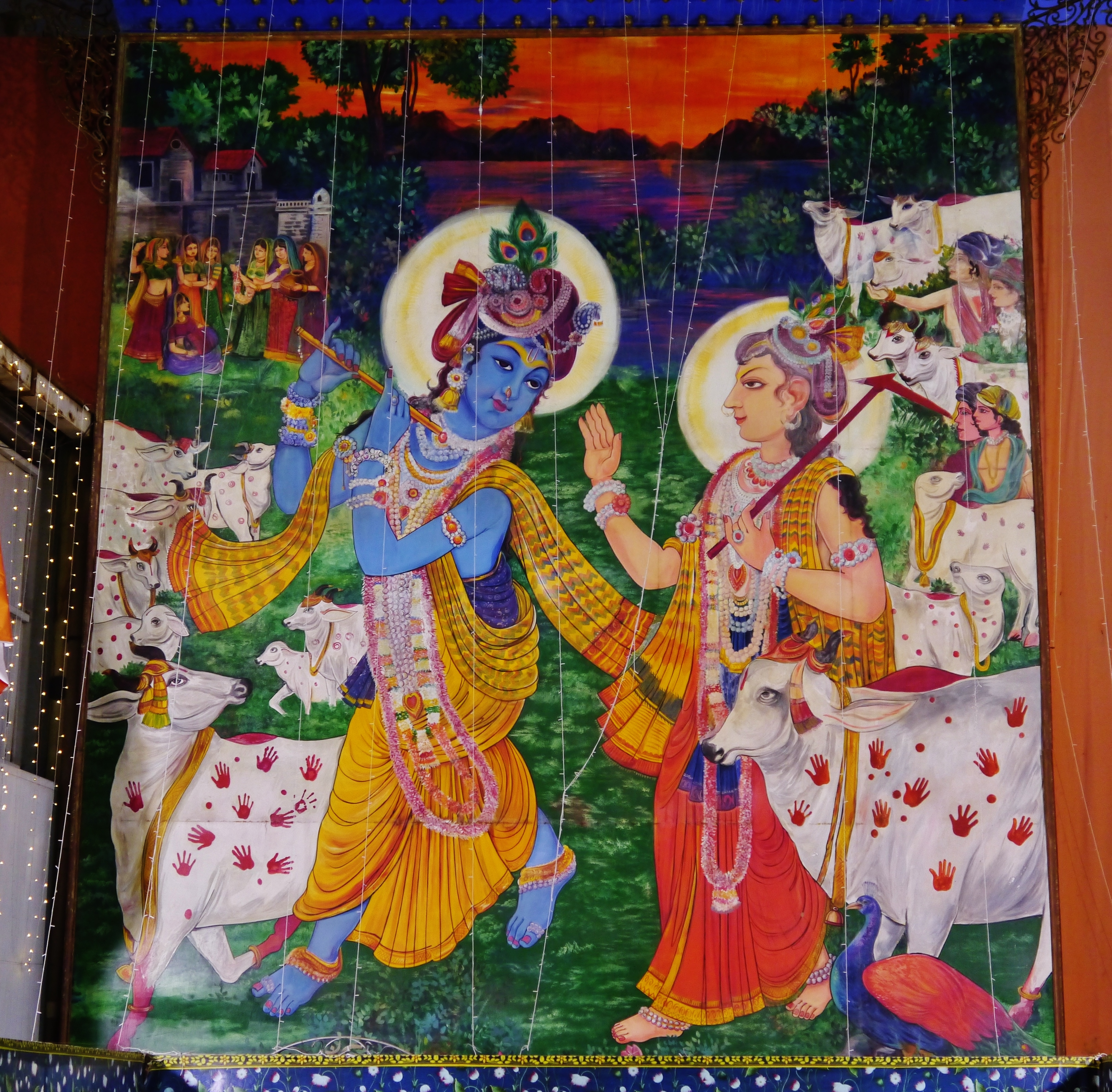
Krishna & Balarama

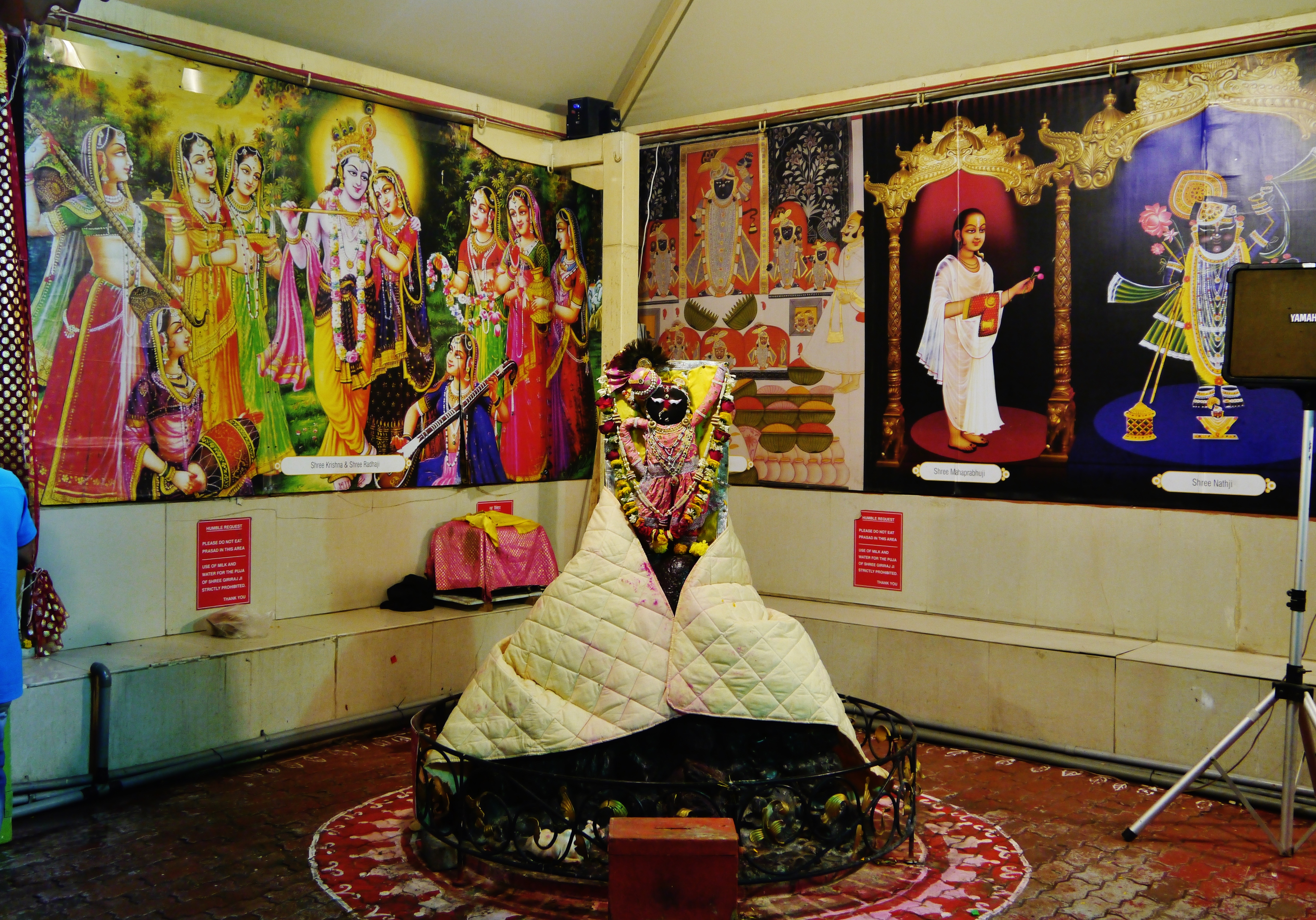
Shrinathji

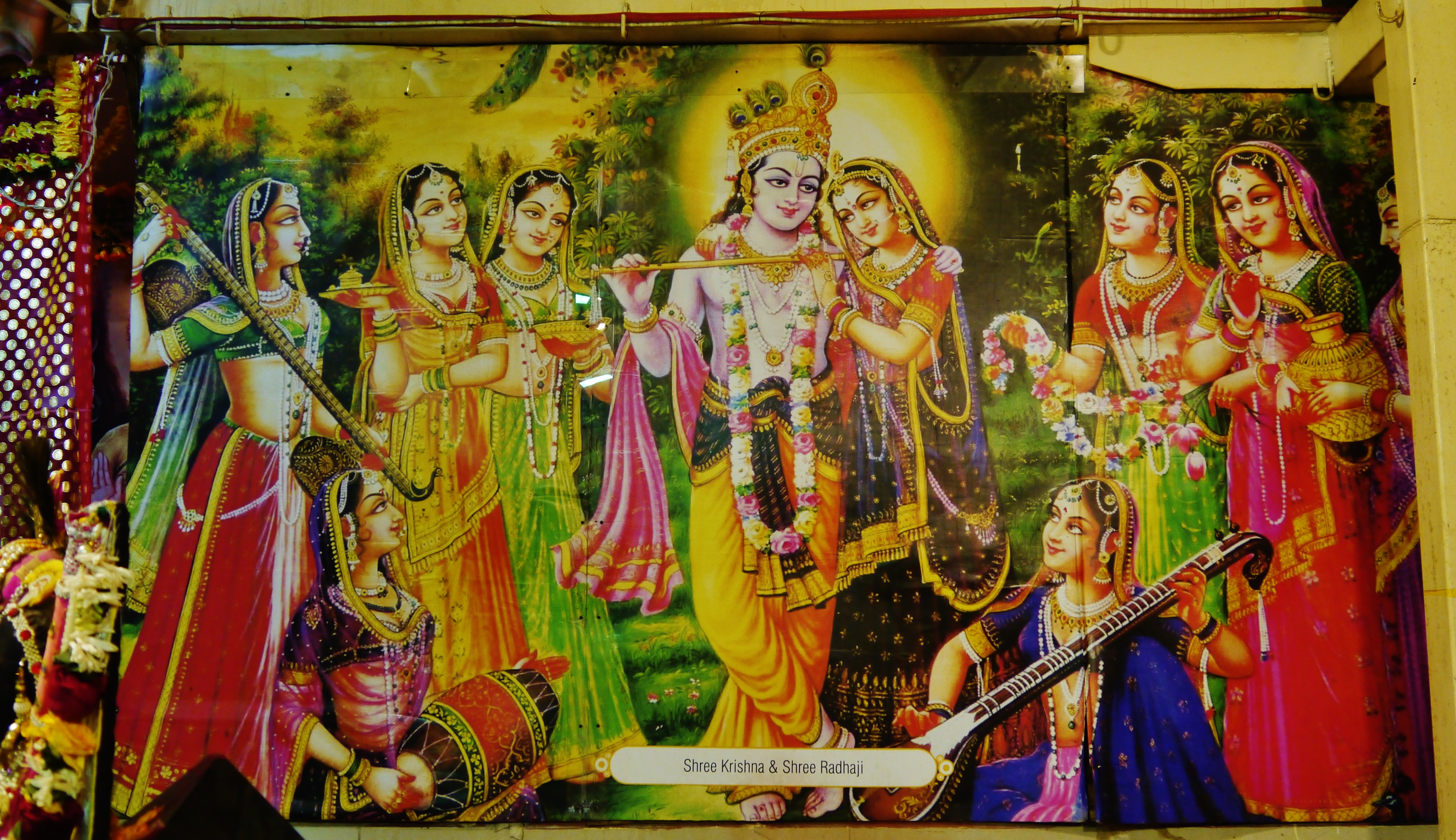
Radha Krishna

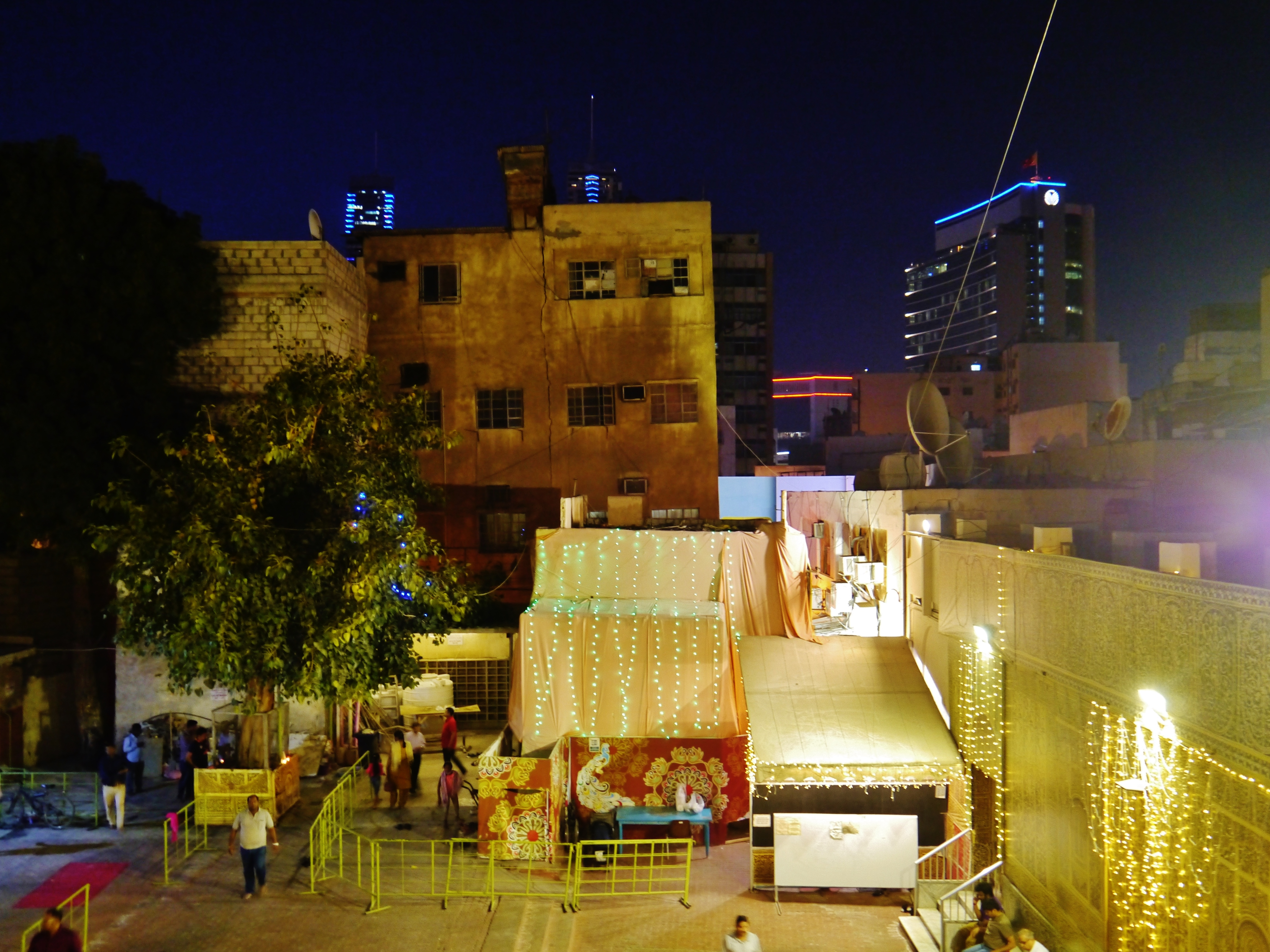
Front of the temple, Neighbourhood

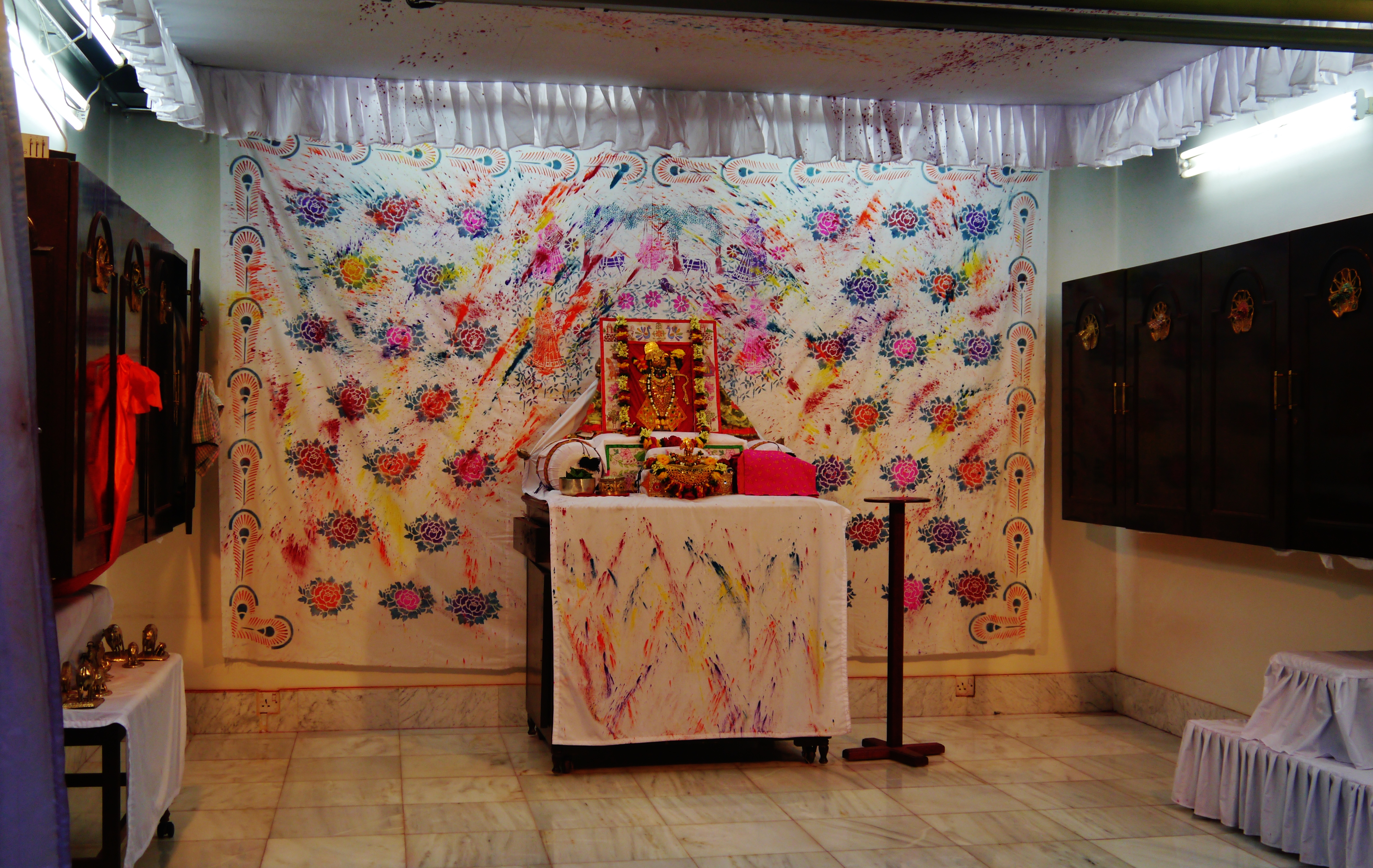
Temple interiors

== See also ==
- BAPS Shri Swaminarayan Mandir Abu Dhabi in Abu Dhabi, UAE
- Motishwar Shiv Mandir in Muscat, Oman
- Hinduism in Bahrain
