= Abdul Amir al-Jamri =

Bahraini opposition leader and Shia cleric (1938–2006)

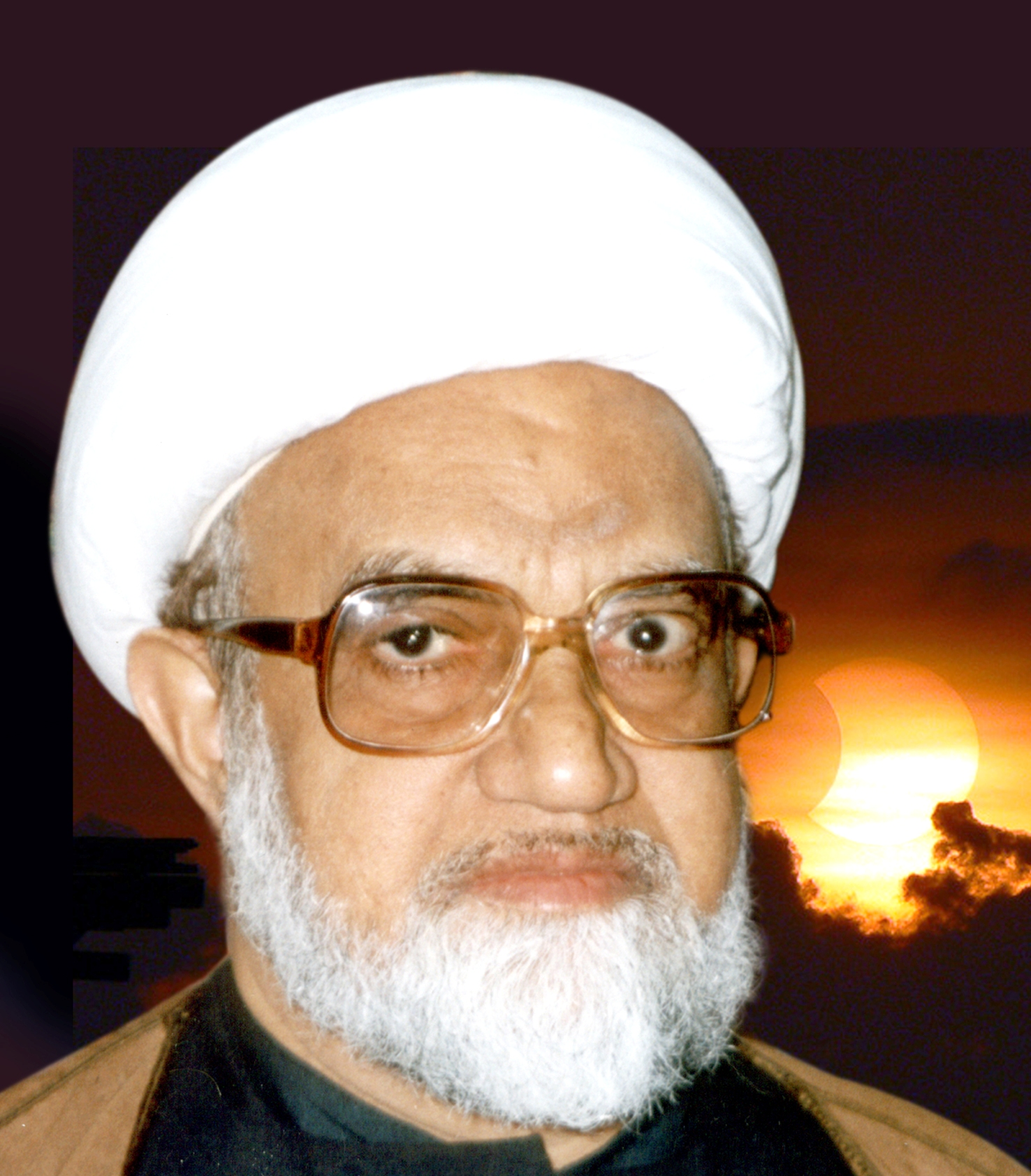
- Title: Sheikh

Personal life
- Born: March 1, 1938 Bani Jamra, Bahrain
- Died: December 18, 2006 (aged 68)
- Cause of death: Multiple organ failure
- Main interest(s): Jurisprudence; Politics
- Occupation: Member of Parliament (1973–5); Judge (1977–88)
- Website: aljamri.org

Religious life
- Religion: Islam
- Jurisprudence: Shia
- Creed: Shia Islam

Muslim leader
- Influenced by: Mohammad Baqir al-Sadr Abu al-Qasim al-Khoei

Sheikh Abdul Amir al-Jamri (/ˈɑːbdəl əˈmɪər æl ˈdʒɑːmri/ AHB-dəl ə-MEER al JAHM-ree; Arabic: شيخ عبدالأمير الجمري; 1 March 1938 – 18 December 2006) was one of the most prominent Shia clerics and opposition leaders in Bahrain. He was also a writer and a poet.

Born in the village of Bani Jamra, al-Jamri became a Hussaini khatib (Shia preacher) after finishing primary school. At the age of 21, he began his Islamic studies, first in Bahrain and later in the religious institute of Al Najaf, Iraq, where he remained for 11 years. He returned to Bahrain in 1973 and was elected to the newly formed parliament. The parliament was dissolved two years later by the Emir, Isa bin Salman al-Khalifa, after it had rejected the State Security Law. In 1977, al-Jamri was appointed as a judge at the High Religious Court of Bahrain. He held the position until 1988, when he was briefly arrested due to his criticism of the government.

Al-Jamri is most notable for his role during the 1990s uprising in Bahrain. As the lead figure of the opposition, he succeeded in bringing Islamists, liberals and leftists together against the monarchy. The events began in the form of petitions in 1992 and 1994 calling for restoration of the parliament and reinstatement of the suspended constitution, but led to widespread violence and the death of 40 individuals. Due to his civil rights activity, al-Jamri was imprisoned between April and September 1995, before being arrested again in January 1996 and imprisoned until July 1999, which was followed by a year and a half of house arrest.

In January 2001, al-Jamri was released along with other opposition activists. The new emir, Hamad bin Isa Al Khalifa, proposed a reform plan, the National Action Charter of Bahrain, which was accepted by the opposition and later gained widespread popular support. A year later, Hamad issued a new constitution which al-Jamri said fell short of the opposition's demands. Disappointed, al-Jamri soon fell ill, suffering from a series of strokes and eventually dying of multiple organ failure.

== Early life and Islamic studies ==
Al-Jamri was born in the village of Bani Jamra, Northern Bahrain, on 1 March 1938. His full name was Abdul Amir bin Mansoor bin Mohammed bin Abdulrasool bin Mohammed bin Hussain bin Ebrahim bin Makki bin Suleiman bin Makki al-Jamri al-Bahrani (Arabic: عبدالأمير بن منصور بن محمد بن عبدالرسول بن محمد بن حسين بن إبراهيم بن مكي بن سليمان بن مكي الجمري البحراني), although he was also known by his kunya Abu Jameel (Arabic: أبو جميل). His father (known as Mansoor or Nasir) was a Quranic teacher, owner of a textile workshop, and head of a "devout Shia family". Al-Jamri's father taught him the Quran and basics of Islamic prayer when he was six, although died four years later. Al-Jamri finished formal education at Budaiya primary school when he was twelve, before becoming a Hussaini khatib (Shia preacher), learning from other well-known khatibs in his village such as his cousin, the Shia khatib Mulla Atiya al-Jamri. He also obtained a job in the Manama Souq, working there until 1962.

In 1957, when al-Jamri was 19, he married his cousin's granddaughter, Zahra' Yousif Atiya al-Jamri, who was 17 at the time. In his book The Story of My Life, al-Jamri devoted a section to speak about his marriage, in which he described it as a happy one and praised his wife for her patience and loyalty. They had 10 children together: 7 sons and 3 daughters. One of their sons is Mansoor Al-Jamri, editor-in-chief of Al-Wasat newspaper.

In 1959, al-Jamri began his religious studies in Bahrain. He was taught by Sheikh Abdulla al-Bahrani (died 1961) and Sheikh Baqir al-Asfoor. In 1962, following the death of his mentor, al-Jamri travelled to Iraq to study Islamic theology and law in the religious institute of Al Najaf. Mentored for two years by Ayatollah Mohammad Baqir al-Sadr and Abu al-Qasim al-Khoei, he reached the stage of independent research (Bahth al-kharij; Arabic: بحث الخارج), the highest level of study in religious seminaries. He also wrote several religious articles which were published in Iraqi newspapers and magazines. In the country, al-Jamri used the pseudonym Abdulla Mansoor Mohammed in order to avoid trouble when passing through customs in Saudi Arabia, Kuwait and Iraq, where it was believed that the prefix "Abdul" should only be used with the name of God. The pseudonym also helped him evade Iraq's Ba'athist regime of Saddam Hussein following an anti-Ba'athist speech which al-Jamri gave in 1970. Spending 11 years in Iraq, al-Jamri returned to Bahrain in 1973. Between 1973 and 1981, al-Jamri was a frequent host on Bahrain TV, giving religious talks on Islamic occasions such as Ramadan and Ashura. In 1985, he founded a small hawza in the mosque next to his house.

== Member of Parliament ==
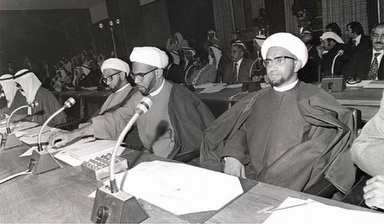
The religious block in Parliament. Sheikh Abdul Amir al-Jamri is on the right

Bahrain became independent from the United Kingdom in 1971 and the Constituent Assembly of 1972 had drafted a new constitution by 1973. Like his study colleague Isa Qassim, al-Jamri initially wanted to complete his religious studies and did not care much about politics. His mentor in Iraq, Mohammad Baqir al-Sadr, issued a binding fatwā for participation in the 1973 parliamentary election. Al-Jamri and five others formed the "Religious Bloc" which adopted a wide program including supporting labour's union and demands, forbidding trade of alcoholic beverages, and separating men and women in education institutes. The bloc also called for prohibiting male doctors from treating female patients (especially in pregnancy) as well as other demands connected to traditional Islamic customs. Al-Jamri was elected to the National Assembly of Bahrain, ranking second behind Isa Qassim.

In August 1975, the constitution was suspended and the assembly dissolved by the Emir, Isa bin Salman al-Khalifa, after it had rejected the State Security Law. The act – also known as "the precautionary law" – was proposed by the British adviser Ian Henderson. It gave police wide powers of arrest and allowed individuals to be held in prison without trial or charge for up to three years (renewable) for suspicion "that they might be a threat to the state". Al-Jamri was a member of a foreign relations committee, and an outspoken critic of the State Security Law.

== 1977–1988 ==
In the period from 1975 to 2001, the Emir ruled by decree. Human rights activists and opposition leaders made repeated allegations of systematic torture, the arbitrary arrest of thousands, and assassinations, all of which were denied by the authorities. Bahrain's Shia population widely claimed that they were being discriminated against by the government, and that they were being treated as second class citizens.

=== Judge ===
In 1977, the government offered al-Jamri the opportunity to serve as a judge at the High Religious Court of Bahrain (Shia branch). Al-Jamri agreed after Abu al-Qasim al-Khoei issued him with a religious permit to do so. The decision was controversial within Bahrain, as many Shia clerics had refused to participate in the government-run judiciary ever since its foundation in the 1920s. Al-Jamri held the position until June 1988, when he was suspended due to his criticism of the government.

=== Political activism ===
Following the 1979 Iranian Revolution, and continuing throughout the 1980s, the intensity of Bahrain's political situation sharply increased. Al-Jamri, who was then participating in several petitions, was questioned multiple times and put under strict surveillance by the Security and Intelligence Service. In 1984, the Islamic Enlightenment institution, with which al-Jamri was associated, was closed by the government. The government also closed other places of meeting and prohibited public seminars. Al-Jamry however opened his house for daily meetings, also offering a weekly space for public debates; he continued to do so despite several government attempts to stop him.

In 1988, the situation came to a head when al-Jamri ignored a final warning by the government. In June, he was dismissed from his job as a judge. In August, his son-in-law Abduljalil Khalil was arrested and sentenced to seven years imprisonment. In September, his elder son Mohamed Jameel was arrested and sentenced to ten years. The authorities then ordered al-Jamri's arrest; on 6 September, Colonel Adel Flaifel and a number of security forces arrived at his house. Al-Jamri's wife rushed to the nearby mosque and called people from its speakers. Amid neighbours' protests, security forces decided to let al-Jarmi go after only an hour's detention.

== Role during the 1990s uprising ==
=== Background ===
There was a time of civil strife in Bahrain from 1994 to 1999, during which leftists, liberals and Islamists joined forces to demand democratic reforms. The uprising was the largest in the country's history, and included widespread demonstrations and violence.

In 1992, a petition was signed by 280 leading figures in civil society, demanding the restoration of parliament, reinstatement of the suspended constitution, the release of political prisoners, and the start of a reconciliation dialogue. The government rejected their demands and instead set up a thirty-member appointed "Shura council" assigned with "commenting" on government proposed legislation. In 1994, another petition was launched with the same demands, this time open to all citizens. Organisers said that they had collected over 20,000 signatures.

Violence broke out in June 1994 when riot police used tear gas on 1,500 demonstrators who had organised a sit-in in front of the Ministry of Labor. The protesters were campaigning against the increasing rate of unemployment, which had reached 15 percent. Over the following years, many opposition leaders were arrested and others exiled. Some protesters used Molotov cocktails to attack "police stations, banks and commercial properties". Riot police used tear gas and rubber bullets, some of which were fired at the crowd from police helicopters. It was also reported that police used live ammunition in some cases. Overall, about forty people were killed, including several detainees who were in police custody (allegedly due to torture), and at least three policemen.

During the uprising, al-Jamri "rose to prominence", becoming the lead figure among the opposition, who saw him as "their father figure and spiritual mentor." To the Shia, he was their "spiritual leader". He was a "chief architect" and a signatory of the 1992 and 1994 petitions. He was also the informal leader of the U.K.-based Bahrain Freedom Movement. Al-Jamri, himself a Shia Islamist, had good relations with secular and liberal opposition forces and united them into "an effective opposition movement". Due to his civil rights activity, the pro-democracy cleric was arrested and placed under house arrest for years.

=== First arrest ===
In 1995, following clashes between security forces and students, the government accused al-Jamri of having links to Iran and seeking to establish an "Islamic republic" in Bahrain. Al-Jamri denied the accusations. Nevertheless, on 1 April the government imposed a blockade on al-Jamri's home of Bani Jamra, placing him and 18 members of his family under house arrest. At least one man was killed and 16 others injured during clashes with police. That day became known locally as the Black Saturday. Two weeks later, al-Jamri was transferred to a detention centre. Along with other opposition figures he was released on 25 September 1995, following a deal with the government to calm down the situation in return for opening up talks on the restoration of parliament. Tens of thousands of Bahrainis gathered to welcome al-Jamri following his release. He gave a speech in which he promised to stay loyal to the hopes and sufferings of the Bahraini people.

=== Second arrest, trial and conviction ===
On 23 October, al-Jamri and other released opposition activists began a 10-day hunger strike in his house to protest what they called the government's failure to fulfil its pledges. Tens of thousands gathered in solidarity with the activists on the final day of the hunger strike (1 November). On 21 January 1996 al-Jamri was detained again along with 7 other opposition leaders, including Abdulwahab Hussain and Hassan Mushaima, following the collapse of the talks. The arrests provoked further unrest. The activists denied the charges of forming a militia group called "Bahraini Hizbullah" or receiving support from Iran.

Al-Jamri spent 3 and a half years in prison, during which he allegedly spent the first 9 months in solitary confinement and was closely observed during the remaining period. On 21 February 1999, about three years after his arrest, al-Jamri's trial before the State Security Court began. On 7 July, the court convicted him on charges of "spying and inciting unrest against the royal family". Al-Jamri was sentenced to 10 years imprisonment and fined BD5.7 million (US$15 million). British politician George Galloway, Human Rights Watch, International Pen and Amnesty International led campaigns in solidarity with al-Jamri. The latter also named him a prisoner of conscience.

=== Release, reconciliation and disappointment ===
Emir Isa bin Salman died suddenly on 6 March and was succeeded by his eldest son, Hamad bin Isa al Khalifa. The new emir pardoned al-Jamri and released him a day after his conviction (8 July), but placed him under house arrest until 23 January 2001. Before getting pardoned, al-Jamri had to appear on national television and read a "humiliating letter of apology" to the Emir. Repeated meetings between commissioners of the Emir and al-Jamri were held during the house arrest period. Subsequent days saw the release of further political prisoners, and exiles were allowed to return. On 8 February, al-Jamri and 3 other opposition leaders —Abdulla al-Ghuraifi, Abdulwahab Hussain and Ali Rabea— met with the emir to discuss his reform plans, the National Action Charter of Bahrain.

The Charter called for the introduction of a constitutional monarchy, an independent judiciary, and a bicameral legislature composed of a lower house of elected representatives and an upper house of appointed legislators. The Charter also granted equal rights between men and women, and recognised all Bahraini citizens as having equal political rights, including the entitlement to elections and political candidacy. In the 8 February meeting, the government promised that "the new political arrangements will not invalidate the 1973 constitution and that the upper appointed house will be for consultation only." The next day, after leading Friday prayer, al-Jamri delivered a famous speech, starting with "Allah is my witness, I have missed you as much as Jacob missed Joseph", before Abdulwahab announced that the opposition had decided to accept the reform plan. The National Action Charter was voted on in a referendum on 14 and 15 February, gaining massive popular support (98.4%). In November 2001, the Al Wefaq Shia political society was founded, with al-Jamri being seen as its mentor.

On 14 February 2002, the Emir introduced the new constitution of 2002, which gave him wide-ranging powers and gave the upper appointed house more powers than the elected lower house, including the right to legislate. The "honeymoon" period between the opposition and government was over; al-Jamri stated his disappointment with the new constitution, stating that it fell short of the opposition's demands. "[T]his is not the type of parliament we had demanded," he said.

== Illness and death ==
Then under house arrest, in May 2000 al-Jamri suffered a heart attack. He was taken to the Bahrain Defence Force Hospital, where he underwent surgery. During his stay at the hospital, he was visited by the King and Prime Minister. In May 2002, al-Jamri traveled to Germany for spinal surgery. While undergoing medical check-ups, it was discovered he had a thrombus behind his eye, which had developed when he was in prison. Following the surgery he suffered a stroke, also developing kidney problems and a blood infection, soon falling into a coma. He woke from the coma on 30 June, but shortly after suffered a second stroke, resulting in internal bleeding, and incapacitating him for the rest of his life.

On 27 January 2003, al-Jamri was transferred from Germany to Sultan bin Abdulaziz Humanitarian City in Saudi Arabia, where his medical condition improved slightly. He returned to Bahrain on 12 July and was welcomed by hundreds of his supporters. His medical condition deteriorated again as he suffered from repeated respiratory problems and another stroke, and in the end he lost the ability to speak. In the early morning of 18 December 2006, al-Jamri was rushed by ambulance from his home to Salmaniya Medical Complex, where he was announced dead. The cause of death was heart and kidney failure.

== Aftermath ==
=== Funeral ===
Although al-Jamri's death was announced in the morning, the mourning processions only began after the sunset Maghrib prayer. The funeral course was changed several times. Ultimately, it began at 6:00 in Muqsha village before moving along the west side of Budaiya highway to Bani Jamra, where al-Jamri was buried at 10:00. The weather was extremely cold for Bahrain, yet thousands showed up wearing black mourning clothes and carrying black flags. According to a number of Al-Wasat writers, the funeral was the largest in the modern history of Bahrain.

=== Successor ===
Following the 2002 deterioration of his health, al-Jamri's position as a political and religious leader of Bahrain's Shia opposition was taken over by his lifelong friend, Ayatollah Isa Qassim. Qassim was less revolutionary than al-Jamri, having opposed the 1992 and 1994 petitions, but his views were kept private, in part as a sign of respect for al-Jamri. Al-Jamri's role as leader of the opposition remained empty, as the opposition became fragmented.

== Publications ==
Al-Jamri wrote several books and poems (in Arabic). He kept writing poems even when he became bedridden. His books include:

- Women in Islam
- Islamic Duties
- Islamic Teachings
- The Story of My Life
