= State of Bahrain =

Country in the Persian Gulf (1971–2002)

State of Bahrain دولة البحرين Dawlat al-Baḥrayn
- 1971–2002
- Flag (1972–2002) Coat of arms
- Anthem: نشيد البحرين الوطني; Baḥraynunā; Our Bahrain
- Location of Bahrain
- Capital: Manama
- Common languages: Arabic
- Religion: Islam (official religion)
- Government: Absolute monarchy
- Emir
  - 1971–1999: Isa ibn Salman Al Khalifa
  - 1999–2002: Hamad ibn Isa Al Khalifa
- Prime Minister
  - 1971–2002: Khalifa bin Salman Al Khalifa
- Legislature: None (rule by decree) (until 1973 and after 1975); National Assembly (in 1973–1975)
- History
  - Independence from the United Kingdom: 15 August 1971
  - Elevated to Kingdom: 14 February 2002

Population
  - 1971: 216,078
  - 2001: 650,604
- Currency: Bahraini dinar
- ISO 3166 code: BH
Preceded by	Succeeded by
Bahrain and its Dependencies	Kingdom of Bahrain
- Today part of: Bahrain

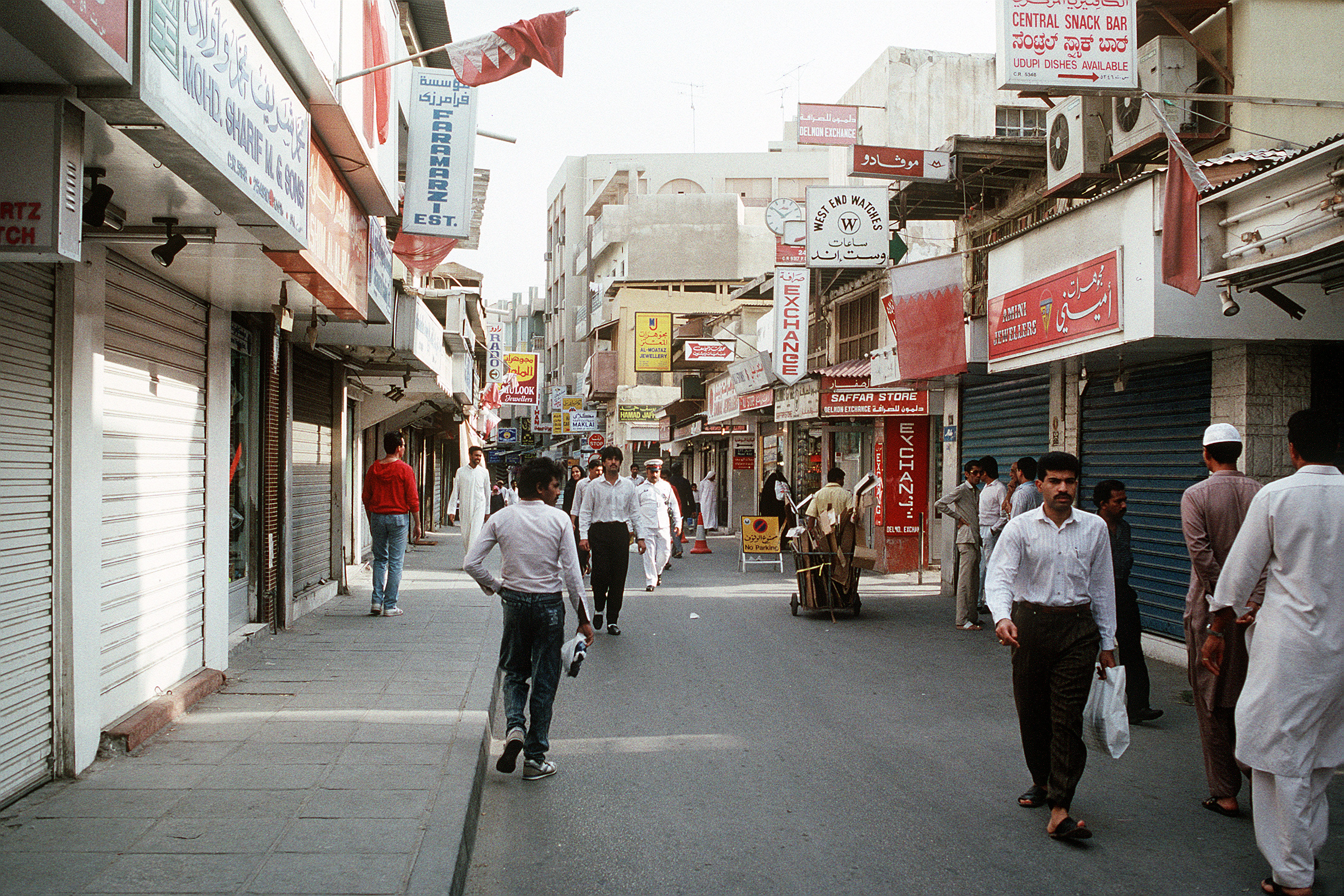
Souq of Manama, 1991

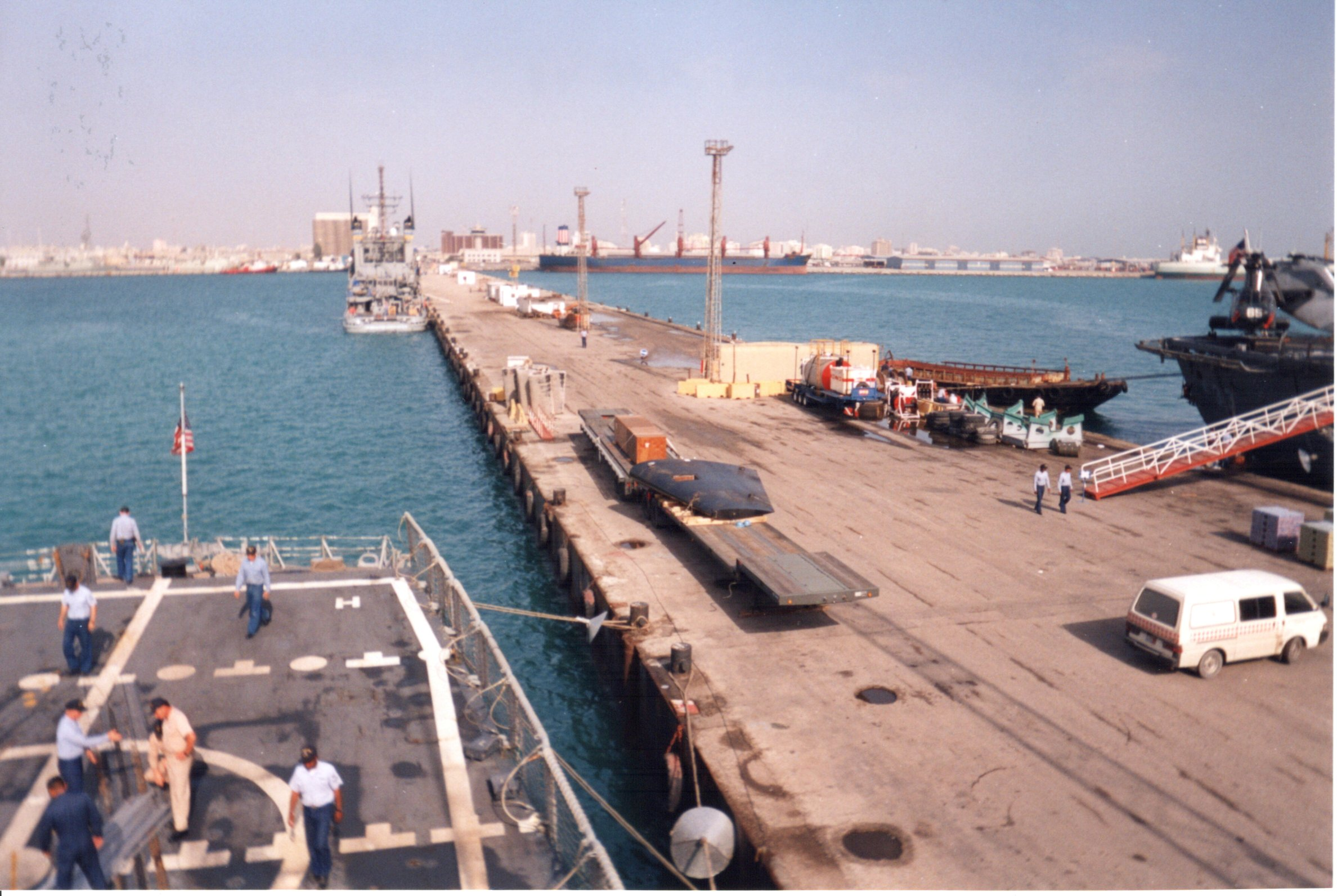
Pier at Mina Salman, 1996

The State of Bahrain (Arabic: دولة البحرين, romanized: Dawlat al-Baḥrayn) was the name of Bahrain from 1971 to 2002. On 15 August 1971, Bahrain declared independence and signed a new treaty of friendship with the United Kingdom. Bahrain joined the United Nations and the Arab League later in the year. The oil boom of the 1970s benefited Bahrain greatly, although the subsequent downturn hurt the economy. The country had already begun diversification of its economy and benefited further from Lebanese Civil War in the 1970s and 1980s, when Bahrain replaced Beirut as the Middle East's financial hub after Lebanon's large banking sector was driven out of the country by the war.

Following the 1979 Islamic revolution in Iran, in 1981 Bahraini Shī'a fundamentalists orchestrated a failed coup attempt under the auspices of a front organisation, the Islamic Front for the Liberation of Bahrain. The coup would have installed a Shī'a cleric exiled in Iran, Hujjatu l-Islām Hādī al-Mudarrisī, as supreme leader heading a theocratic government. In December 1994, a group of youths threw stones at female runners during an international marathon for running bare-legged. The resulting clash with police soon grew into civil unrest.

A popular uprising occurred between 1994 and 2000 in which leftists, liberals and Islamists joined forces. The event resulted in approximately forty deaths and ended after Hamad ibn Isa Al Khalifa became the Emir of Bahrain in 1999. A referendum on 14–15 February 2001 massively supported the National Action Charter. Hamad instituted elections for parliament, gave women the right to vote, and released all political prisoners. As part of the adoption of the National Action Charter on 14 February 2002, Bahrain changed its formal name from the State (dawla) of Bahrain to the Kingdom of Bahrain.

== The constitutional experiment ==
Based on its new constitution, Bahraini men elected its first National Assembly in 1973 (although Article 43 of the 1973 Constitution states that the Assembly is to be elected by "universal suffrage", the conditional clause "in accordance with the provisions of the electoral law" allowed the regime to prevent women from participating). Although the Assembly and the then emir Isa ibn Salman al-Khalifa quarreled over a number of issues: foreign policy; the U.S. naval presence, and the budget, the biggest clash came over the State Security Law (SSL). The Assembly refused to ratify the government-sponsored law, which allowed, among other things, the arrest and detention of people for up to three years, (renewable) without a trial.

The legislative stalemate over this act created a public crisis, and on 25 August 1975, the emir dissolved the Assembly. The emir then ratified the State Security Law by decree, and suspended the constitution's articles dealing with the legislative powers of the Assembly. In that same year, the emir established the State Security Court, whose judgments were not subject to appeal.

== Constitution of 1973 ==
The constitution of 1973 was written shortly after Bahrain's independence from Britain in 1971. In 1972, the then ruler Isa bin Salman Al Khalifa issued a decree providing for the election of a Constituent Assembly that would be responsible for drafting and ratifying the constitution. The electorate of the constituent assembly was native-born male citizens aged twenty years or older. The constituent assembly consisted of twenty-two elected delegates, plus the twelve members of the Council of Ministers and eight members directly appointed by the emir Shaikh Isa.

The constitution drawn up provided for a unicameral legislature (the National Assembly) consisting of 30 members elected through "universal suffrage" (though franchise was restricted to males), plus fourteen royally-appointed government ministers who are ex officio members. The constitution was enacted by amiri decree in December 1973.

Only one parliamentary election was ever held under the 1973 Constitution (see: Bahraini parliamentary election, 1973) before it was abrogated by the emir Shaikh Isa in 1975. The country was governed under emergency laws from 1975 to 2002.
