= Mansoor al-Jamri =

Bahraini journalist, author, and activist (born 1961)

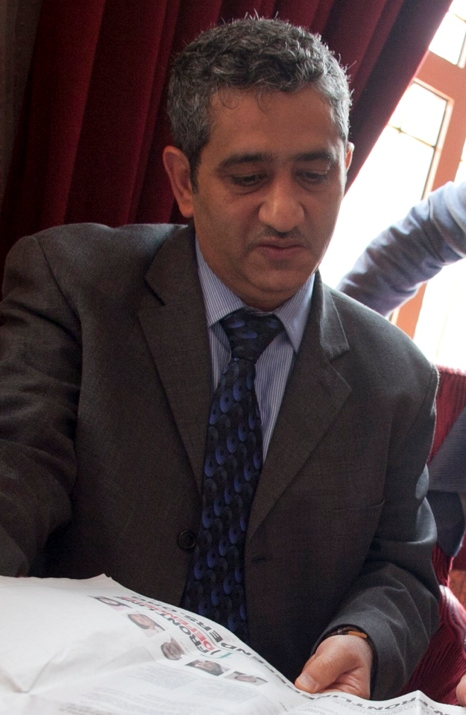
- al-Jamri in July 2011
- Born: 17 December 1961 (age 64); Bahrain
- Education: PhD in Mechanical Engineering (Paisley University); MSc in Management (Bristol University)
- Occupations: Columnist, editor, author, publisher and human rights activists.
- Years active: Spokesman of the Opposition (1994–2001); Editor-in-chief of Al-Wasat (2002–2017)
- Organization: Al-Wasat
- Spouse: Reem Khalifa
- Parents: Abdul Amir al-Jamri (Father); Zahra' Yousif Atiya al-Jamri (Mother)
- Awards: CPJ International Press Freedom Award (2011); Peace Through Media Award (2012)
- Website: Al-Wasat newspaper; Facebook; Twitter

Mansoor al-Jamri (also Mansour; Arabic: منصور الجمري; born 17 December 1961) is a Bahraini columnist, author, human rights activist and former opposition leader. He is the editor-in-chief of Al-Wasat, an Arabic language independent daily newspaper. He is also the second son of the Shia spiritual leader Sheikh Abdul-Amir al-Jamri, who died in 2006.

A few months after he was born in the village of Bani Jamra, al-Jamri moved with his family to Iraq where his father continued his religious studies. To his delight, al-Jamri returned to Bahrain in 1973 and five years later graduated from high school. In 1979 he moved to the United Kingdom (UK) to continue his higher education. Between 1987 and 2001, al-Jamri lived in self-imposed exile in UK where he became the spokesman of a UK-based opposition group. Following a series of reforms, which he was initially skeptical of, al-Jamri returned to Bahrain in December 2001. He co-founded Al-Wasat in September 2002 and has been its editor-in-chief since then. The newspaper, said to be the only one offering independent and non-sectarian coverage in Bahrain, was a success, becoming the country's most popular and profitable. Al-Jamri writes daily columns described to be moderate and non-sectarian.

When the Bahraini uprising started in February 2011, Al-Wasat and al-Jamri covered both sides of the conflict. Al-Jamri was involved in reconciliation talks until 15 March when Saudi troops entered Bahrain. That day, Al-Wasat printing facility was destroyed. Its employees which already faced harassment by groups of youths began remote work. The next month, the newspaper was charged by government to publishing fabricated news about the uprising and was suspended. Al-Jamri acknowledged his mistake, but said he was set up and downplayed the impact of the false news. He resigned from his position and the newspaper was allowed to publish the next day. He was subsequently charged and convicted of publishing false news. In August, Al-Wasat board of directors reinstated him back to his position. In June 2017, the Information Affairs Ministry indefinitely suspended the newspaper, forcing the paper's closure. Amnesty International termed the government's actions an "all-out campaign to end independent reporting".

== Early life and education ==
Mansoor al-Jamri was born in Bahrain on 17 December 1961. Al-Jamri's father Sheikh Abdul Amir is a Shia cleric who became the leader of the opposition and the spiritual father of the Shia during the 1990s uprising in Bahrain. His mother, Zahra' is the grand daughter of the renovator Shia khatib Mulla Atiya al-Jamri. They were married in Bahrain in 1957. Abdul Amir was 20 and Zahra', his cousin's grand daughter was 16.

Few months after his birth, al-Jamri family traveled to Najaf, Iraq where his father continued his religious studies. At the time, al-Jamri's family was composed of his parents and his 2-year-old brother Mohammed Jameel. He studied for five years at the Talibiya primary school which was also attended by some Bahrainis such as Sami, the elder son of Isa Qassim. Having no TV at home, al-Jamri and his siblings spent most of their time listening to stories told by their mother or playing with kites outside. At the age of 9, he began practicing Islamic prayers and fasting in Ramadan.

In his book Non-scattered memories of Najaf, al-Jamri describes the dire situation in Iraq following the rise of Ba'ath party in 1968. He writes that the "biggest tragedy" he witnessed was the deportation of Iraqis of Iranian origins, some of whom were his neighbors. Al-Jamri and his school colleagues were often forced to take part in pro and anti-Ba'athist protests.

Al-Jamri's first memories in Bahrain were during a visit with father during the month of Ramadan. Although he was mocked by other kids due to his partly Iraqi accent, al-Jamri said he was very happy with the visit as he found his village Bani Jamra much more "open" than Najaf. In 1973, al-Jamri returned to Bahrain with his family, spending 11 years of his life in Iraq. He said his father's decision to return to Bahrain was the "best news I have ever received" and that to him Bahrain represented "freedom and eternal joy".

In 1978, al-Jamri graduated from high school, technical sector. In 1979, he traveled to the United Kingdom to continue his higher education after receiving a scholarship from Ministry of Education. He studied mechanical engineering at the University of the West of Scotland (Paisley University) of which he holds the doctorate degree. Trouble followed al-Jamri during his visits to Bahrain as he was questioned by security forces in 1980, his passport withdrawn for a year in 1982 and in 1987 he was not able to find a job. In 1987, al-Jamri immigrated to Britain which he held its citizenship. He lived in self-imposed exile for 14 years during which he continued his studies and became the spokesman of the London-based opposition group. He was also a "frequent guest on international news outlets such as the BBC."

Al-Jamri is married to Reem Khalifa, a columnist and reporter working for Al-Wasat and the Associated Press. Unlike Mansoor, she follows the Sunni branch of Islam. She was described by The New York Times as a "woman of Western tastes". Khalifa comes from a leftist family.

== Founding of Al-Wasat ==
In 1999, then-Emir (now King) Hamad bin Isa Al Khalifa began a reform process and in 2001 exiles were told they could come back. Rejecting an offer to become a cabinet minister and leaving his leading position in the opposition, al-Jamri returned from the United Kingdom in December 2001, eight months after his father had obtained a consent from the Emir to establish two newspapers. Initially, he was sceptical about the king's reform plan, but al-Jamri received a personal invitation by the king and was given a large margin of freedom of expression. Al-Jamri, backed by 39 other private investors (US$5.3 million capital) had initially planned to establish two independent newspapers, Al-Wasat in Arabic and Gulf Observer in English.

Al-Wasat (literally, "The Center") was founded in September 2002 and its co-founder al-Jamri became its editor-in-chief. By 2011 it had become the country's most popular newspaper with a daily circulation of 15,000 and readership of 45,000 to 60,000. It employed 200 individuals, a quarter of them worked as reporters or editors. Its coverage was described by Committee to Protect Journalists as independent and non-sectarian, however this did not spare it from occasional harassment and political pressure. Al-Wasat is the only independent and non-sectarian newspaper in the county and is also "widely credited with being the first Bahraini newspaper to voice opposition views". Although it also covers the government point of view, the newspaper is sometimes classified as siding with opposition. According to Margaret Warner of PBS NewsHour, Al-Wasat is the "most popular and profitable newspaper" in Bahrain and al-Jamri's column is a "voice for non-sectarian moderation".

== Bahraini uprising ==
=== Background ===
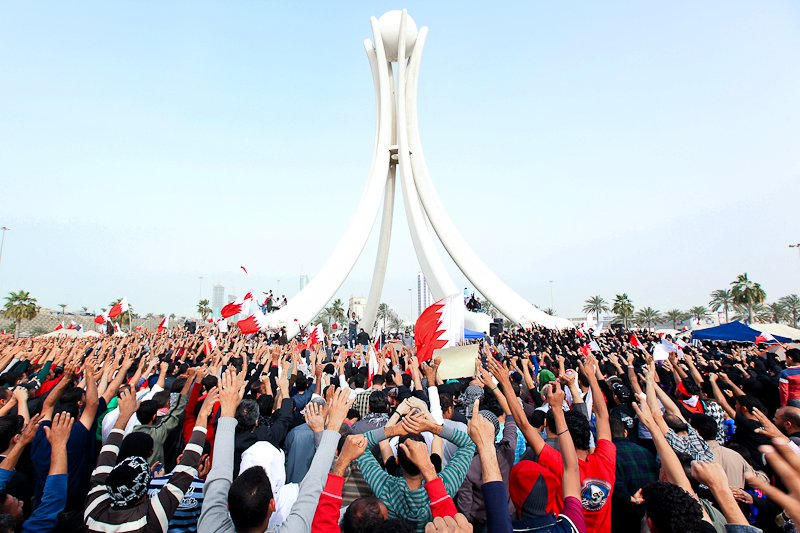
Protests at Pearl Roundabout in February 2011

Beginning in February 2011, Bahrain saw sustained pro-democracy protests, centered at Pearl Roundabout in the capital of Manama, as part of the wider Arab Spring. Authorities responded with a night raid on 17 February (later referred to by protesters as Bloody Thursday), which left four protesters dead and more than 300 injured. In March, martial law was declared and Saudi troops were called in. Despite the hard crackdown and official ban, the protests continued.

=== Role of al-Jamri and Al-Wasat ===
During the uprising, Al Wasat was a voice for "moderation and prudence" that urged compromise from both sides and its popularity reportedly increased by 30 percent. In his columns, al-Jamri criticized the government for its repression and protesters for blocking a main highway. Al-Jamri said he was involved in meditation efforts between the two sides of the conflict until 15 March after Saudi troops had entered Bahrain. He added that he refused to be hosted on Al-Manar and Al-Alam News Network, because "their rhetoric is not in accordance with Al-Wasat's". This however, did not spare Al-Wasat from the effects of the unrest as its printing facility was surrounded by youths who harassed employees since 12 March.

Three days later, the facility was attacked at 1am by a club-wielding-gang that "attack[ed] the touch screens and computers of the printing machine," said the head of Al-Wasat printing press. That day Al-Wasat was printed by another newspaper. Employees had to work from home as "hundreds of vigilantes encircled the area", they (employees) were harassed in checkpoints and authorities reportedly failed to protect them even after getting contacted. Al-Jamri reported receiving death threats via phone and getting intimidated by government informers. "One of our photographers had camera smashed into his head and needed hospitalization, several distributors were beaten, and one columnist disappeared for a month. But under all of these circumstances, we continued," al-Jamri said.

=== Suspension of Al-Wasat and resignation of al-Jamri ===
On 2 April, following a three-hour episode on Bahrain TV alleging it had published false and fabricated news and images in its 26 and 29 March editions, Al-Wasat was forced to close down and had its website blocked by the Information Affairs Authority (IAA). The state-run Bahrain News Agency accused it of "unethical" media coverage of the events of the uprising and the IAA released a 30-page report "detailing Al Wasat's alleged transgressions". The news and images turned out to be either from other countries or from previous events. The newspaper did not publish an edition on 3 April. Al-Jamri acknowledged that the reports identified in Bahrain TV show were false, but said he and his staff did not "knowingly [publish] false information".

The ban was lifted a day later after al-Jamri and two other top editors had resigned. Al-Jamri said his resignation was "needed to safeguard the newspaper and the livelihood of its staff." On 4 April, Al-Wasat resumed publishing under the supervision of two Iraqi editors. The two temporary editors were questioned in the National Security Agency and were deported along with their families after they had refused to confess against al-Jamri. Al-Jamri and the two editors who resigned were subsequently questioned and charged with "publishing fabricated news and made up stories... that may harm public safety and national interests."

Unlike other cases which were brought before a military court, their first trial session on 18 May was before the (civilian) High Criminal Court and was postponed to June. Al-Jamri said before a trial session on 19 June that the fabricated news articles were sent to Al-Wasat from a Saudi IP address and that they were not verified properly due to the previous attacks on Al-Wasat. "It was a setup. We were framed into it, and later on attacked, using – using it as a launching pad for closing down the newspaper," al-Jamri said in a press interview. "If a bank CEO wanted to steal, he wouldn't steal just 20 dollars, maybe he'd steal 2 million. The fabricated news were of the price of 20 dollars," he added.

Human Rights Watch (HRW) said the charges were politically motivated and asked authorities to drop them, allow al-Jamri back to his position and "cease their campaign to silence independent journalism". The advocacy group added that following al-Jamri's resignation, Al-Wasat's coverage of human rights violations decreased significantly. "Bahrain's rulers are showing they have no shame by muzzling the one media outlet that was widely regarded as the country's only independent news source," Joe Stork of HRW said. The Committee to Protect Journalists condemned the actions of Bahraini government and described them as "strong-arm tactics". The non-government organization added that its research supported claims by al-Jamri that the government was behind planting the false news. Mohammed al-Maskati of Bahrain Youth Society for Human Rights accused the Ministry of Interior of planting the fake stories. "They wanted him to quit, and the paper has totally changed," he added.

On 4 August, al-Jamri was reinstated back to his position by the board of directors. On 11 October, al-Jamri and his colleagues were found guilty by the court and fined US$2,650 each. Subsequently, al-Jamri received two international awards; the CPJ International Press Freedom Award in 2011 and the Next Century Foundation's Peace Through Media Award in 2012. In September 2011, Al-Wasat won the UNICEF regional award for electronic media and in May 2012, it was ranked top in the Media Credibility Index ahead of Al Jazeera, BBC, Agence France-Presse and more than a dozen other media outlets.

== Publications ==
Al-Jamri has written several books, mostly in Arabic. These include Memories of Childhood (2007), Interventions on Thought and Politics (2008),Concepts in Management and Leadership (2016), and Principled Leadership in Management and Development (2018) . The Memories of Childhood is a narrative of al-Jamri's childhood in Iraq, the experiences he had and the events he witnessed. He was motivated to write it by people's reactions following the death of his father and dedicated the book to his memory. The Interventions on Thought and Politics deals with political and ideological concepts in Europe and the Muslim world, and how Muslim countries can benefit from them in order to consolidate the political pluralism within the Islamic theme. Al-Jamri also writes a daily column in Al-Wasat and regular articles on politics and human rights for other publications such as Carnegie Endowment for International Peace.
