= Abduljalil Khalil =

Bahraini politician (born 1961)

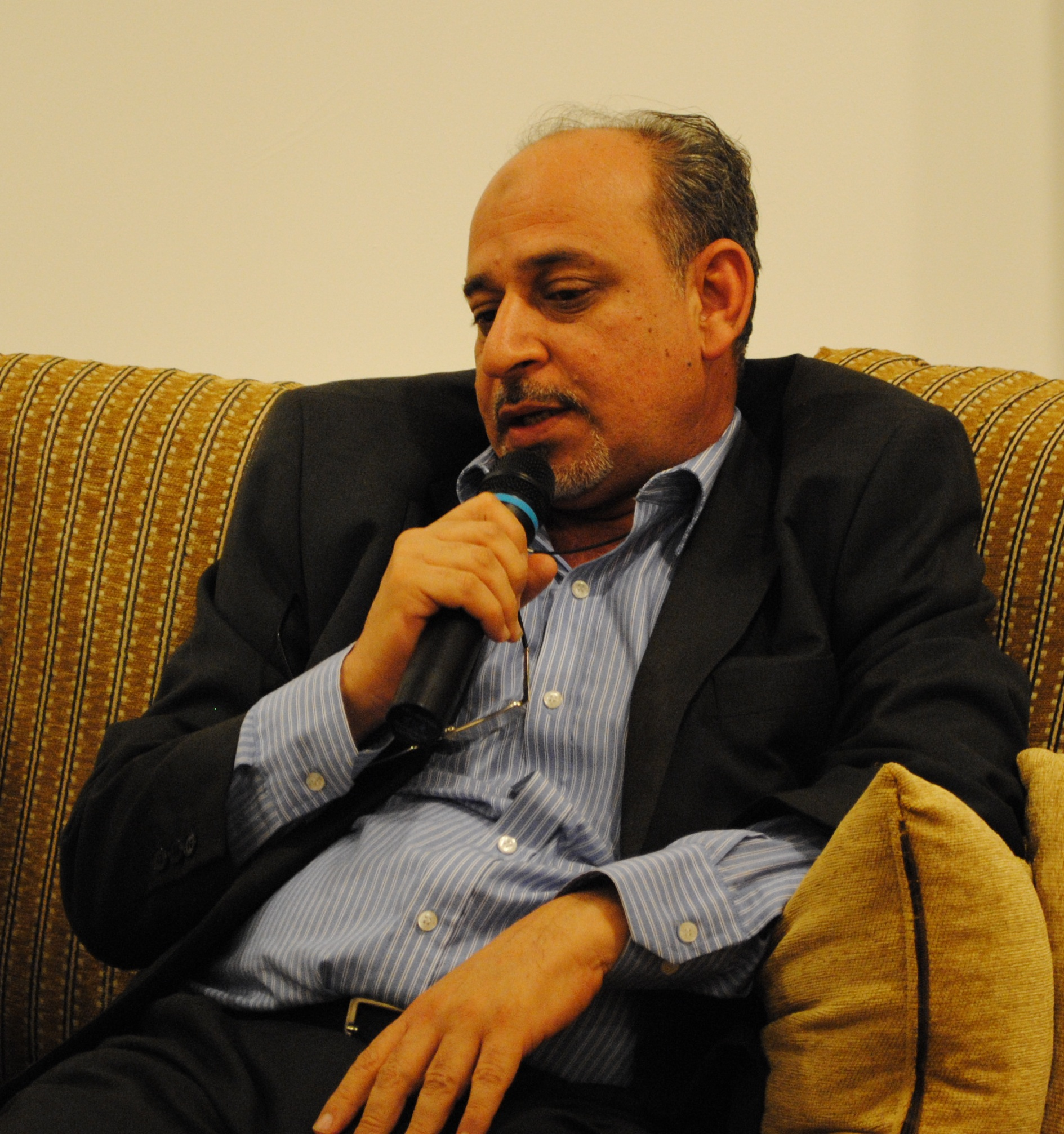
- Abduljalil Khalil in September 2012
- Born: Abduljalil Khalil Ibrahim Hassan; 14 December 1961 (age 63); Bahrain
- Education: MSc in Building Services Administration (Heriot-Watt University); BSc in Mechanical Engineering (King Saud University)
- Occupation: Politician
- Organization: Al Wefaq
- Spouse: Afaf al-Jamri
- Website: Blog; Twitter

Abduljalil Khalil Ibrahim Hassan (also Abdul Jalil; Arabic: عبدالجليل خليل إبراهيم حسن; born 14 December 1961) is a Bahraini politician. He is former Member of Parliament of Al Wefaq political party.

== Early life and career ==
Khalil was born in the village of Sanabis, Bahrain on 14 December 1961. He studied mechanical engineering at King Saud University earning his BSc in January 1986. In July 1999, he earned MSc building services administration from Heriot-Watt University. Between 1995 and 2006, he worked at AERMEC, advancing from a field services engineer in March 1995 to a project manager in August 1999 and finally to a general manager in September 2000. He writes regular opinion piece in Al Wasat local newspaper and is a board member of Bahrain Society of Engineers, the American Bahraini Friendship Society and al-Jamri foundation, "which seeks to foster Sunni-Shi'a dialogue." He also heads the Bahrain Society for University Students and is said to have "close associations with recent university graduates." A WikiLeaks cable described him as being known for his "intelligence, management, administrative [and oratory] skills."

Khalil is married to Afaf al-Jamri, a women's activist and writer. She is the daughter of Shia cleric Abdul Amir al-Jamri, sister to Mansoor al-Jamri, editor-in-chief of Al-Wasat and Mohammed Jameel, a former member of parliament. They have two sons and a daughter.

== Political life ==
In August 1988, Khalil was arrested in connection with opposition activities related to his father-in-law, with whom he had very strong relations. He was subsequently sentenced to seven years in prison. He was reportedly tortured during detention. He was pardoned by the Emir (now king) in 2000.

Khalil was a founding member of Al Wefaq political party in 2001. He holds a senior position in the party. In 2006, he was elected to the Council of Representatives, the lower house of the parliament as a representative of the Capital Governorate's 4th district. He headed the parliament's finance committee and led investigations into state properties. He was noted for his ability to cooperate with other blocs despite sectarian differences. He won by default in 2010, becoming the head of Al Wefaq's bloc. In February 2011, Khalil and 17 other Al Wefaq MPs (the largest bloc) submitted their resignations in protest against the government crackdown on Arab Spring-inspired protests.
