= Khalifa Ahmed Al Bin Ali =

Khalifa Ahmed Al Bin Ali (Arabic: خليفة بن أحمد آل بن علي) (1936–2006), was a Bahraini lawyer of the Al Bin Ali tribe from the early 1970s through the early 2000s.

== Biography ==
Khalifa Ahmed Al Bin Ali was born in the town of Hidd on Muharraq Island in the Kingdom of Bahrain in 1936. He graduated from Rabat University in Morocco and obtained an LL.B. He was a former lawyer since 1963. Nine years later, he was elected as a member of the Constitutional Assembly of Bahrain 1972-1973 that ratified the Constitution of the Kingdom of Bahrain ( State of Bahrain back then) also known as Constitution 73. He was also elected a member of the National Assembly of Bahrain 1973–1975, also known as Parliament 73, as well as serving as the vice-president of the National Assembly. In 1986, he was appointed by decree no. 5 of 1986 by the Cabinet affairs in the Kingdom of Bahrain (known as "State of Bahrain" back then) as a member in the Sunni Wakf department which was subject to the Ministry of Justice and Islamic Affairs. His period in the Sunni Wakf was from 1986 to 1992, which was headed back then by Shaikh Daij bin Hamad bin Abdulla Al-Khalifa. Khalifa Al-Binali was also a member of the financial committee as well as the rental committee in the Suni Wakf, in which he was an active member, and that resulted in him creating the contracts for the rental income of the Sunni Wakf. Later in late 1992, he was appointed by the Late Amir Shaikh Isa Bin Sulman Al-Khalifa as a member of the Consultative Council of Bahrain as well as being the Head of the Legal Committee during all three sessions: 1992–1996, 1996–2000, 2000–2002. In 2000, he was elected by the Amir of Bahrain as a member of the Supreme National Committee which was chosen by the Amir to prepare the National Action Charter of Bahrain, which was a document put forward by King Hamad ibn Isa Al Khalifah of Bahrain in 2001 in order to end the popular 1990s uprising and return the country to constitutional rule. It was accepted in a national referendum in 2001, in which 98.4% of the voters voted in favor of the document. In 2003, he was appointed by King of Bahrain Hamad bin Isa Al Khalifa as a member ( Judge) of the Constitutional Court for a period of six years.

== Expectations that did not occur ==
Some reliable sources assert that the Government of Bahrain expected Khalifa Ahmed Al-Binali to run as a candidate in the 2002 Bahrain Council of Representatives and eventually become the speaker of the Council of Representatives instead of Khalifa Al-Dhahrani due to his wide experience as a lawyer, one of the founders of the 1973 constitution, vice-president of parliament of 73, head of the legal committee during the Consultative Council of Bahrain 1992–2002, as well as being an active member of the Supreme National Committee for the National Charter of Bahrain (Al-Meethak), but due to his illness in early 2002 those expectations did not occur.

== Death ==
He died on 21 September 2006 and was buried in his hometown of Hidd on Muharraq island.

== See also ==
- Full text of the National Action Charter of Bahrain
- Constitution of Bahrain
- History of Bahrain
- National Assembly of Bahrain
- Consultative Council of Bahrain
