= Bani Jamra =

Bani Jamra بني جمرة
- Village
- Location in Bahrain
- Coordinates: 26°12′41″N 50°27′35″E
- Country: Bahrain
- Governorate: Northern Governorate

Bani Jamra (Arabic: بني جمرة) is a village in the north-west of Bahrain. It lies west of the capital Manama and east of the coastal village of Budaiya. It is administered under the Northern Governorate.

Before the discovery of oil in Bahrain, most of inhabitants were involved in farming, especially date palms. Bani Jamra is also famous as a center of traditional fabric weaving, a rapidly dying art.

== History ==
In J. G. Lorimer's Gazetteer of the Persian Gulf (1908), he writes that the village consisted of 50 huts occupied by the Baharna, who were mostly farmers and weavers. There were an estimated 1,500 palm trees in the village.

== Notable people ==
- Mullah Attiya al-Jamri, Bahraini poet
- Abdul Amir al-Jamri, Bahraini opposition leader
- Mansoor Al-Jamri, editor-in-chief of Al-Wasat
