= Reem Khalifa =

Bahraini writer & journalist (born 1974)

- ريم عبد الرحمن خليفة
- Born: Reem Abdul Rahman Khalifa; February 1974 (age 52); Kuwait
- Education: University of Westminster
- Occupation: Journalist
- Years active: 1997 to present
- Employer: Al-Wasat
- Spouse: Mansoor al-Jamri
- Children: 2 (son and daughter)

Reem Abdul Rahman Khalifa (Arabic: ريم خليفة, born February 1974, Kuwait) is a Bahraini writer, journalist, and human rights activist. She helped launch the Bahraini newspaper, Al-Wasat before moving on to work as a reporter for the Associated Press in Manama. Khalifa also co-founded the Migrant Workers’ Protection Society and the Bahrain Society against Domestic Violence.

Khalifa used to write a daily opinion column for Al-Wasat and a weekly column for the Qatarii newspaper, Al Raya. Today, she writes for several websites.

== Early life and education ==
Khalifa was born in Kuwait, studied in local schools, and continued her studies in Bahrain until she moved to the United Kingdom to complete her university education. She earned a Bachelor of Arts in International Relations from the Webster University London Branch in 1996, followed by a Master of Arts in Diplomatic Relations from the University of Westminster in London. By 2002, Khalifa held a Postgraduate Diploma in Written Journalism from the Thomson Foundation in Cardiff.

== Career ==
Khalifa's career began with an internship at Asharq Al-Awsat in London, where she worked for The Majalla and Hia magazines from October 1997 to April 1998. From September 1998 to February 2000, she served as local affairs editor for Al Ayam in Bahrain. Later, she freelanced as a writer and editor for Al-Wasat and became an official correspondent for the Associated Press in the capital, Manama. She moved to From March 2000 to April 2002, she was political editor for Al Khaleej, while also serving as Manama correspondent for the magazine Monte Carlo until mid-2003.

Khalifa co-founded the international news bureau at Al-Wasat in 2002, where she specializes in diplomatic coverage, investigative reporting, and interviews with prominent Arab and international politicians. She covered area conferences such as the Arab League and Gulf Cooperation Council for Bahraini, Arab, and international outlets. She also covered the Arab Spring, including the Bahraini uprising of 2011. She famously was quoted in international media describing the killing of protesters who stormed the Pearl Roundabout on Bahrain Bloody Thursday (February 17) as a “real massacre.” Facing a defamation suit from the government, she labeled the accusation “part of a systematic campaign led by the government to prosecute the independent press and public figures who covered the events in Bahrain.”
