= 1973 Constitution =

The 1973 Constitution or the Constitution of 1973 may refer to

- A Constitution of Bahrain
- The present Constitution of Pakistan
- An historical Constitution of the Philippines
