= Shia Islam in Bahrain =

Shia Muslims account for around 45% of Bahraini citizens with Sunni Muslims being the majority of 55%. Shias were previously the majority, being approximately 55% in 1979. However, the increased naturalization of Sunni migrants and persecution of Shia Muslims by the ruling Sunni Al Khalifa family led to an alteration in the demographics.

According to The Washington Institute for Near East Policy, the views of Shia and Sunni leaders in Bahrain are generally aligned with those of their counterparts in the Middle East. The most recent official estimate, published in 2011, indicated that Sunnis accounted for 51% of Bahraini citizens, while the Shias had declined to 49%.

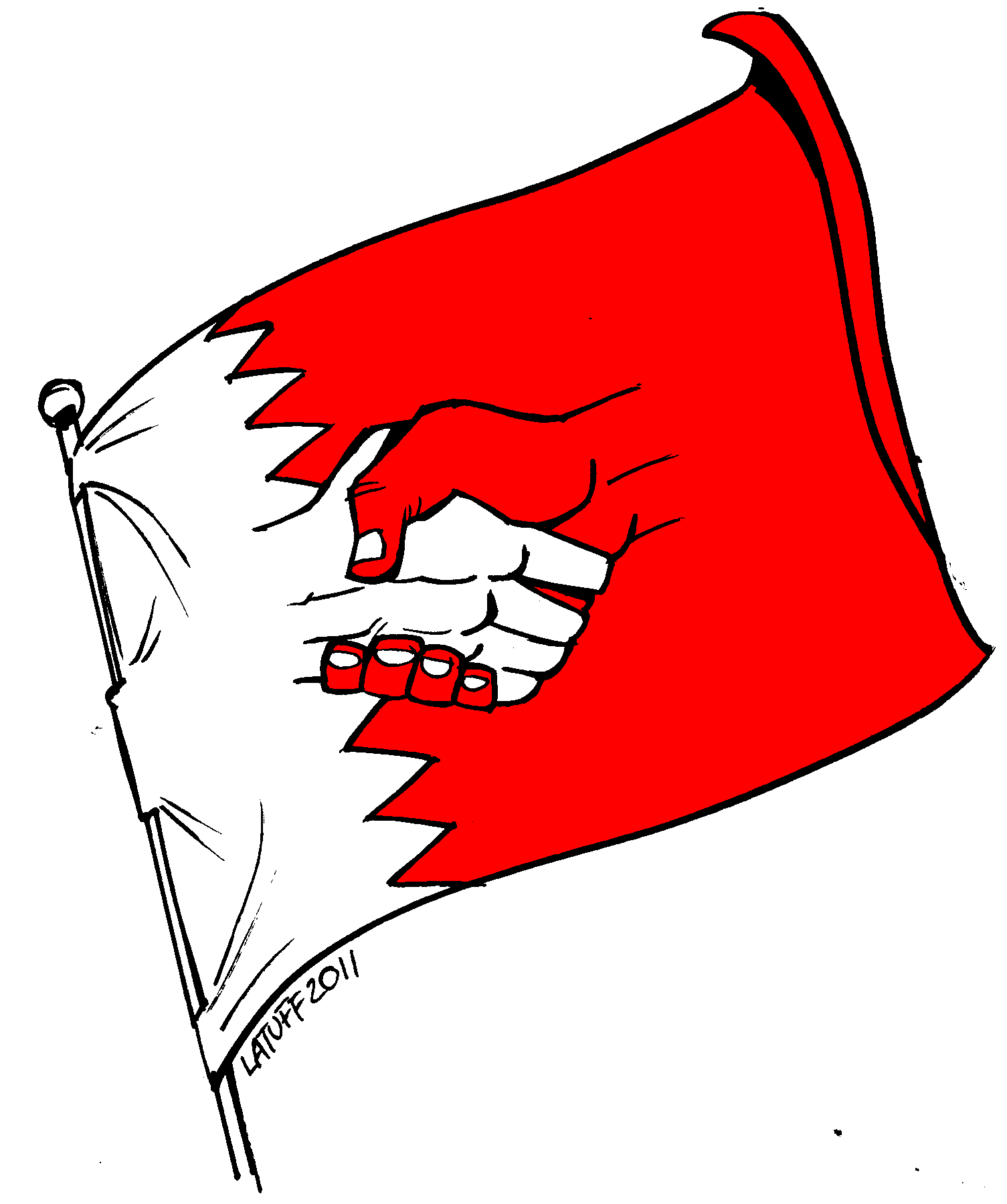
Sunnis and Shias United for Bahrain

== History ==
Bahrain’s longstanding historical ties with Persia significantly shaped the island’s Shia community, as Persian influence extended from the Achaemenid era into the Safavid period (1501–1722). During these centuries, Bahrain became an active center of Twelver scholarship, where Shia theologians produced influential works in fields such as jurisprudence, theology, and philosophy. The 1717 Omani invasion forced many prominent Shia ulama, including Yusuf bin Ahmed Al Bahrani, to flee, leading to the spread of Bahraini Shia networks abroad. Although the Al Khalifa dynasty assumed control of the island in 1783, Iranian claims persisted into the twentieth century, raising tensions both before and after the 1979 Iranian Revolution. The revolution itself had an “electrifying effect on the politics of Bahrain,” fueling domestic pressures among Shia communities who pushed for deeper political and economic reforms.

The Sunni Al Khalifa family arrived in Bahrain from Najd in 1783. The Shia people of Bahrain celebrated the victory of the Iranian Revolution and formed gatherings to support it. In 1979, Shias were 55% and they wanted to participate in determining their own destiny through protests against the Al Khalifa government. Al Wefaq, as part of the Shia society in Bahrain, follows two goals: opposition to the current government in Bahrain and change the structure of society to based on rule of the people. Established in 2001, it was founded by more than 100 Shia scholars such as Ali Salman, Saeid Shahabi, Abdul Amir al-Jamri and Sheikh Isa Ahmed Qassim, leader of Al Wefaq.

=== February 14 Youth Coalition ===
A 2011 estimate suggested that Shia Muslims comprised around 60% of the Muslim population in Bahrain. According to behavior of Al-Khalifa's government, Shia activists prompted on February 14, 2011. They named that day as the Day of Rage and asked the people to protest against al-Khalifa's behavior at that day. The Al-Khalifa came into contact with the protesters and from that day widespread wave of Al-Khalifa's actions against Shias has been performed, including the detention of women and men and children and their torture, the destruction of Shia mosques and cemeteries.

Shias are estimated to be around 45%, though faced persecution from the ruling Sunni royal family, the Al Khalifa.

== Society ==
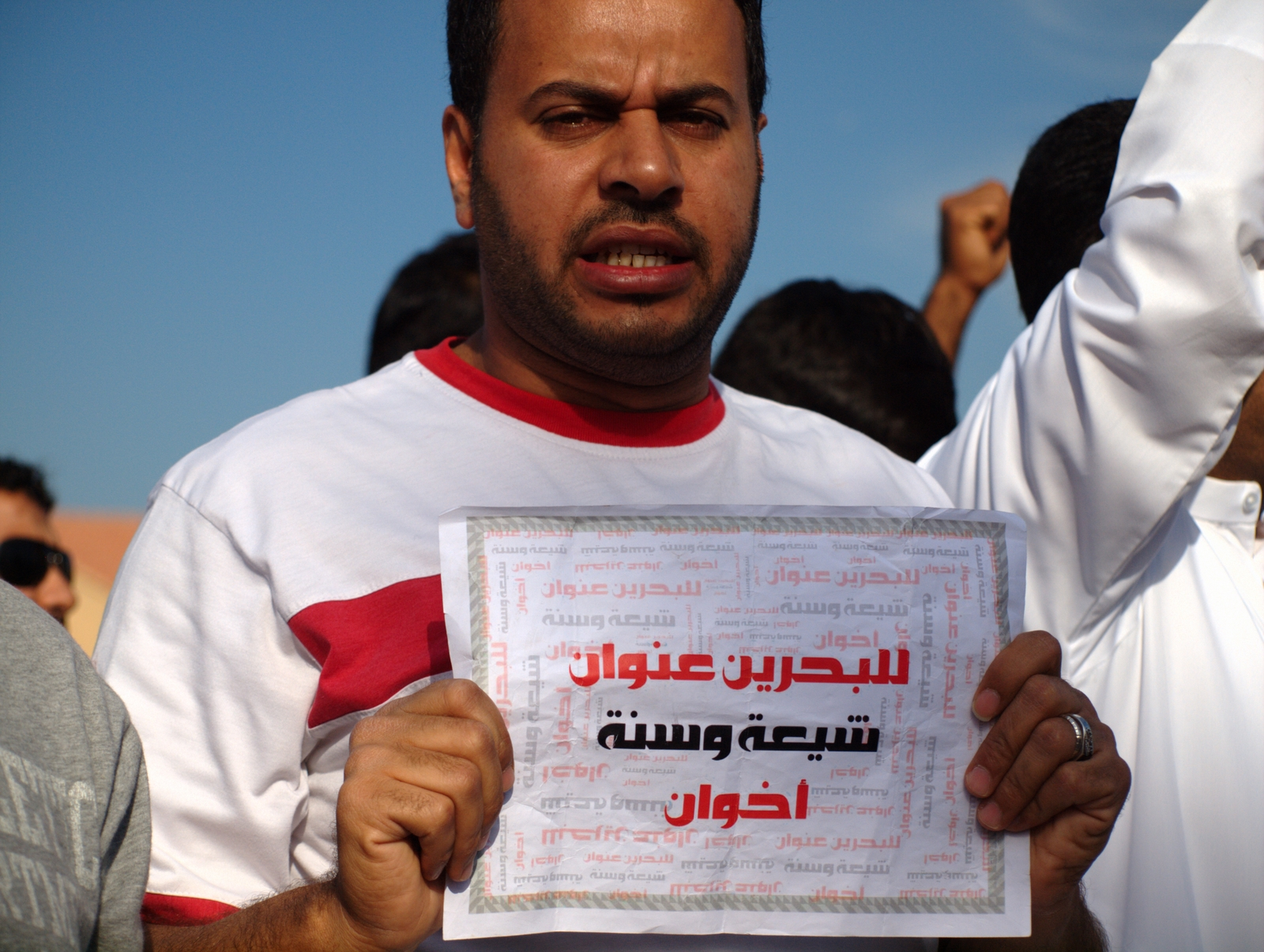
The majority of Sunni-Shia unity

There are various sects in Bahrain, such as Bahrani, Arab, Howala, Ajmi, Asians. On the other hand, dominant political and official system in Bahrain are governed by Sunni people.

According to the reports of The Guardian, when Āl Khalīfah family began to govern Bahrain, Shiites who have pieces of land, were changed to peasants. Now, High-ranking official positions belong to Sunnis and only few positions are ruled by Shiites. It is necessary to mention that in Bahrain Sunni is not synonymous with rich, nor Shia with poor, but on the whole the Shia majority faces worse economic circumstances.

In November 2026, Bahrain's High Criminal Court was due to issue its verdict in a mass trial involving 69 defendants, including 60 Shia clerics and nine other individuals, according to a joint statement by 20 human rights organisations published on 6 November. The defendants faced terrorism-related charges, including allegations of seeking to overthrow the country's constitutional order and promote the doctrine of Wilayat al-Faqih. Bahraini authorities accused the clerics of encouraging allegiance to Iran's supreme leader, while relatives and lawyers of the defendants disputed the accusations. The human rights organisations raised concerns about allegations of torture, coerced confessions and violations of the defendants' right to a fair trial.

== Shia scholars ==
Some of Bahrain's Shia scholars are listed as following:

Maitham Al Bahrani, Kamal al-Deen Maitham bin Ali bin Maitham al-Bahrani, commonly known as Sheikh Maitham Al Bahrani was a leading 13th Century Twelver Eastern Arabian theologian, author, and philosopher. Al Bahrani wrote on Twelver doctrine, affirmed free will, the infallibility of prophets and imams, the appointed imamate of `Ali, and the occultation of the Twelfth Imam. Yusuf al-Bahrani Yusuf ibn Ahmed al-Bahrani (1695–1772) (Arabic: يوسف البحراني) was a Bahraini theologian and a dominant person in the intellectual development of Twelver Shia Islam. Isa Qassim Ayatollah Sheikh Isa Ahmed Qassim (Arabic: آية الله الشيخ عيسى أحمد قاسم) is Bahrain's leading Shia cleric and a politician. He is the spiritual leader of Al Wefaq, Bahrain's biggest opposition society. He was the leader and the founders of Islamic Enlightenment institution.

== See also ==
- Ajam of Bahrain
- Baharna
- Beit Al Qur'an
- Muharram in Bahrain
- Rashid Al Marikhi
