= Hussain Al Baharna =

Bahraini lawyer, legal scholar, author and politician (1932–2025)

- حسين البحارنة
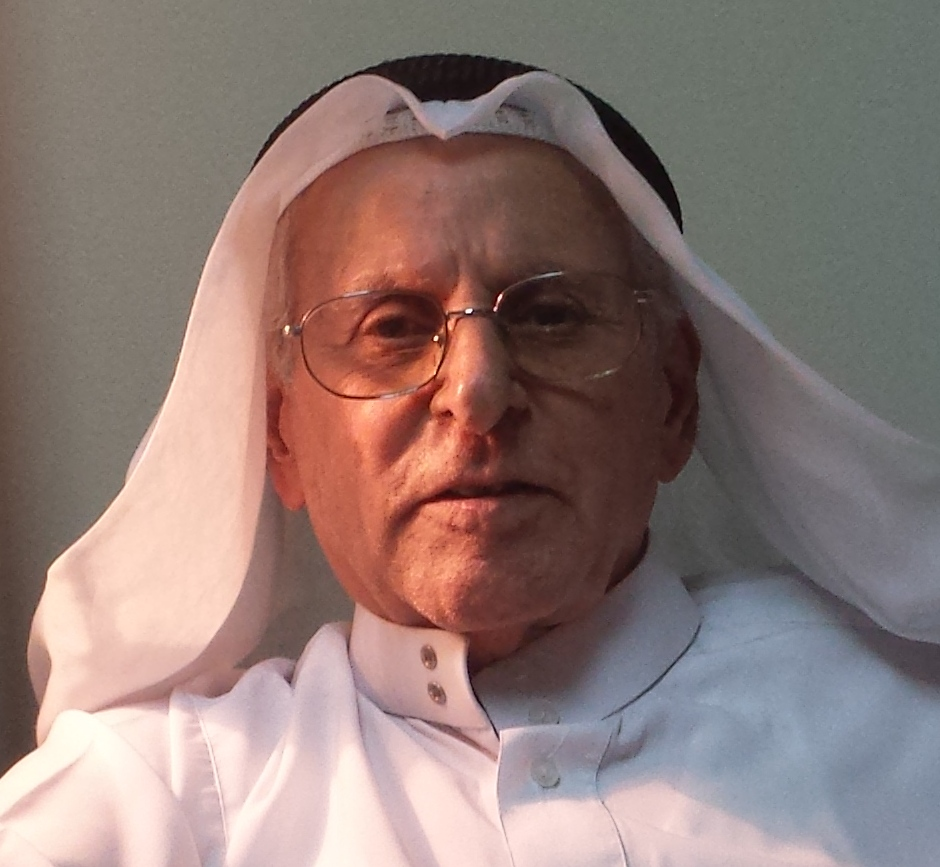
- Al Baharna in 2016
- Born: Hussain Mohammed Al Baharna; 5 December 1932; Bahrain
- Died: 29 June 2025 (aged 92)
- Education: PhD in Public International Law (University of Cambridge); Diploma of Hague Academy of International Law; Postgraduate Diploma in Law (University of London); Barrister-at-Law (Lincoln's Inn); Bachelor of Laws (University of Baghdad)
- Occupations: Politician; lawyer
- Years active: Legal Adviser for Kuwait's Ministry of Foreign Affairs (1962–64); Legal Adviser and Analyst for Aramco (1965–68); Legal Adviser for Bahrain's Department of Foreign Affairs (1969–70); President of Legal Committee in Bahrain's Council of State (1970–71); Bahrain's Minister of State for Legal Affairs (1971–95)
- Children: 5
- Awards: Arab Historian Medal (1986); State of Bahrain Medal of First Grade (1996); Shaikh Isa Bin Salman Medal of First Grade (2001)

Hussain Mohammed Al Baharna (Arabic: حسين محمد البحارنة; 5 December 1932 – 29 June 2025) was a Bahraini lawyer, legal scholar, author and onetime government minister who held a PhD in Public international law from the University of Cambridge and was a legal adviser and Minister of State for Legal Affairs for the Government of Bahrain for 26 years. During his tenure, he participated in writing the draft of Bahrain's first constitution in 1973. He also held several international positions and authored a number of books.

== Background ==
Al Baharna received a Bachelor of Laws from the Law College at the University of Baghdad in 1953. He then moved to London where he studied at Lincoln's Inn and became a Barrister-at-Law. In 1956, he received a Postgraduate Diploma in Law from the University of London. After that he left for The Hague, the Netherlands where he received a Diploma of the Hague Academy of International Law. Finally in 1961, he received a PhD in Public International Law from the University of Cambridge.

Al Baharna died on 29 June 2025, at the age of 92.

== Career ==
In the 1960s, Al Baharna was appointed a legal adviser in Kuwait's Ministry of Foreign Affairs (1962–64) and after that as Legal Adviser and Analyst for Aramco (1965–68). In 1969, he was appointed Legal Adviser for Bahrain's Department of Foreign Affairs, and a year later he was made President of the Legal Committee in Bahrain's Council of State. After Bahrain gained its independence from the United Kingdom in 1971, Al Baharna became the Minister of State for Legal Affairs in the first post-independence cabinet, a position which he held until mid-June 1995, when he was ordered to retire along with several other ministers.

During his period of tenure at government offices which lasted for about 26 years (1969–1995), Al Baharna participated in drafting the modern civil legislation of Bahrain. Most notably he was a member of the ministerial committee tasked with drafting the Constitution of 1973, which was the first such document in the History of Bahrain. He was also Bahrain's Agent and Counsel before the International Court of Justice in the territorial dispute case between Bahrain and Qatar.

In 1987, Al Baharna was elected as representative of Asia to the United Nations' International Law Commission. He was re-elected for four subsequent sessions in a row, serving continuously until 2006. In 1994, he was elected a board member of the International Council for Commercial Arbitration. Between 2003 and 2005, he served as member of the International Court of Arbitration (of the International Chamber of Commerce). He was also a member in numerous local, regional and international legal institutions and societies.

== Publications ==
Al Baharna authored a number of articles and books in Arabic and English, in which he discussed legal and historical topics about Bahrain and the world. Among his publications are the following books:

- The Legal Status of the Arabian Gulf States: A Study of Their Treaty Relations and Their International Problems (1968)
- The Gulf Cooperation Council: Its Legal and International Status (in Arabic, 1973)
- The Legal Status of Iraq's Claim to Sovereignty over Kuwait (in Arabic, 1991)
- British Extra Territorial Jurisdiction in the Gulf 1913–1971 (1998)
- Bahrain Between Two Constitutions (in Arabic, 2005)
- Political and Constitutional Developments of the Gulf States (in Arabic, 2005)
- The Bahrain Nationality Law and the State's Open-door Policy Regarding Naturalization of Foreigners (in Arabic, 2007)
- A Legal Study and Analysis of the Constitutional State of the Kingdom of Bahrain (in Arabic, 2008)
- Iran's Claim To Sovereignty Over Bahrain and the Resolution of the Anglo-Iranian Dispute Over Bahrain (in Arabic and English, 2008)

== See also ==
- Politics of Bahrain
