= Revolution of Dignity (disambiguation) =

The Revolution of Dignity was a 2014 revolution in Ukraine.

Revolution of Dignity or Uprising of Dignity may also refer to:

- 1990s uprising in Bahrain, or the uprising of dignity
- Syrian Revolution (2011), or the Syrian Revolution of Dignity
- Tunisian Revolution (2010–2011), or the Tunisian Revolution of Dignity
- Libyan civil war (2011), or the Libyan Revolution of Dignity
- 2017–2018 Iranian protests, or the Uprising of Dignity

== See also ==
- Friday of Dignity, part of the Syrian Revolution of 2011
