= State Security Law in Bahrain =

Security law of Bahrain

Following Bahrain's independence from the British in 1971, the government of Bahrain embarked on an extended period of political suppression under a 1974 State Security Law shortly after the adoption of the country's first formal Constitution in 1973. Overwhelming objections to state authority resulted in the forced dissolution of the National Assembly by Amir Isa bin Salman Al Khalifa and the suspension of the Constitution until 2001. The State Security Law of 1974 was a law used by the government of Bahrain to crush political unrest from 1974 until 2001. It was during this period that the worst human rights violations and torture were said to have taken place. The State Security Law contained measures permitting the government to arrest and imprison individuals without trial for a period of up to three years for crimes relating to state security. A Decree subsequent to the 1974 Act invoked the establishment of State Security Courts, adding to the conditions conducive to the practice of arbitrary arrest and torture. The deteriorating human rights situation in Bahrain was reported to have reached its height in the mid-1990s (see: 1990s uprising in Bahrain) when thousands of men, women and children were illegally detained, reports of torture and ill-treatment of detainees were documented, and trials fell short of international standards.

Reports from international human rights organizations like Human Rights Watch and Amnesty International reveal that throughout its implementation, the State Security Law facilitated the use of routine torture of political prisoners and perpetuated substantial human rights violations for nearly 25 years. In 2001, Bahrain's current Chief of state, King Hamad bin Isa Al Khalifa abolished the law and declared Bahrain a constitutional monarchy following a national referendum.

== Decree Law on State Security Measures ==
Issued at Rifaa' Palace on 7 Shawwal 1394 (22 October 1974):

=== Article 1 ===
If there is serious evidence that a person has perpetrated acts, delivered statements, exercised activities, or has been involved in contacts inside or outside the country, which are of a nature considered to be in violation of the internal or external security of the country, the religious and national interests of the State, its social or economic system; or considered to be an act of sedition that affects or can possibly affect the existing relations between the people and Government, between the various institutions of the State, between the classes of the people, or between those who work in corporations propagating subversive propaganda or disseminating atheistic principles; the Minister of Interior may order the arrest of that person, committing him to one of Bahrain's prisons, searching him, his residence and the place of his work, and may take any measure which he deems necessary for gathering evidence and completing investigations.

The period of detention may not exceed three years. Searches may only be made and the measures provided for in the first paragraph may only be taken upon judicial writ.

Anyone arrested under the provisions of the first paragraph may submit a complaint against the arrest order, after the expiry of three months from the date of its execution, to the Supreme Court of Appeal. The complaint is renewable at the end of every six months from the date of the decree rejecting the complaint.

=== Article 2 ===
The proceedings of the Court shall always be held in camera and shall only be attended by the prosecution, the complainant and his representative. The proceedings shall be held at the headquarters of the Supreme Court of Appeal. They may be held elsewhere within or outside Manama, if the Court deems it necessary for the maintenance of the security of the country or for considerations of public policy.

=== Article 3 ===
The court, without observing the procedures stipulated in the Law of Criminal Procedures, may lay down the procedures to be followed by it when it considers the complaints, taking the following into account:

1. It shall issue its judgment on the basis of the documents submitted by the prosecution and the complainant.
2. The arguments submitted to the Court, whether by the prosecution or by the defence, shall be in writing.
3. For the sake of evaluating the evidence and forming its opinion, the Court may require the prosecution to furnish additional reports from those who took part in gathering the evidence provided that this shall be limited to persons other than those whose names, residences and places of work are considered to be secret and are not permitted to be disclosed in the interests of the State.
4. It will be sufficient for the defence witnesses of the complainant to present depositions including information concerning the points which the complainant wishes the witnesses to clarify. The Court may refuse to request depositions from the defence witnesses of the complainant if it is of the opinion that the depositions required from them are irrelevant to the event in question. A decision on the complaint may not be postponed because of any delay by these witnesses in presenting their depositions.
5. The documents and reports furnished by the prosecution shall be delivered to it in a sealed envelope following the issuance of the Court's judgment. These may not be requested with regard to a new complaint unless there is something new that necessitates viewing them and this shall be permitted by an order of the Court.
6. Minutes of the proceedings shall be written in one copy. They may not be reproduced or photocopied and, together with the documents of the defence and prosecution as well as the depositions of witnesses, shall be confidential. Following the issuance of the judgment regarding the complaint, they shall be deposited in the cabinet of the Court after they are placed inside a sealed envelope stamped with the seal of the President of the Court which has considered the complaint. It shall be prohibited to open that envelope or to withdraw it from the cabinet except upon a decree by the Court when it is necessary to view it in connection with another complaint. In such a case, a verbatim record of the procedures followed shall be drawn up, in which the condition of the envelope shall be indicated. Then it shall be resealed according to the above-mentioned procedures and deposited in the cabinet after the complaint has been considered. The same procedures shall be followed with regard to every complaint.
7. The Minister of Interior shall be informed of the judgment of the Court as soon as it is pronounced, through a copy of the document containing the judgment.

=== Article 4 ===
If the arrested person does not submit a complaint according to the procedure laid down in Article one, the prosecution shall submit the documents to the competent court during the period fixed for submission of the complaint, requesting that the implementation of the detention order should continued.

=== Article 5 ===
The Minister of Interior may, at any time, order the release of a person in respect of whom an arrest order was previously issued in application of the provisions of this law. The detained person shall be released in any case on the last day of the three years referred to in Article one.

=== Article 6 ===
All persons who are committed to specified prisons in implementation of detention order issued pursuant to Public Security Order No.1 are considered to be detained under this law and the dates for the submission of complaints are applicable to them; they are entitled to submit such complaints from the date on which this law comes into effect.

=== Article 7 ===
The Public Security Law of 1965, the Declaration issued on the 22nd of April 1965 and Public Security Order No.1 are hereby repealed.

=== Article 8 ===
A new paragraph (3) shall be added to Article 79 of the Law of Criminal Procedures, the text of which is as follows:

For crimes detrimental to the security of the State, whether they originate inside the State or outside it, which are stipulated in the Penal Code, the detention order shall be for an unspecified period. The person whose detention has been ordered may submit a complaint against the detention to the authority issuing the warrant if one month has elapsed after the issuance of the warrant. The complaint is renewable one month after the decree rejecting the complaint has been issued.

=== Article 9 ===
The Minister of Interior shall implement this Law, which shall take effect from the date of its publication in the Official Gazette.

Signed by

Emir of The State of Bahrain (Isa bin Salman Al Khalifa);

Prime Minister (Khalifa bin Salman Al Khalifa);
Minister of Interior (Muhammed bin Khalifa Al Khalifa).

== History ==
The State of Bahrain gained full independence from the British in 1971 and was governed by the Amir, Isa bin Salman Al Khalifa. The Al Khalifa's were of a Sunni minority ruling over a predominantly Shia majority population. In 1972, the Amir issued a decree calling for the establishment of a Constitutional Assembly in charge of promulgating the country's first constitution. The 22-member body completed a constitution in June 1973, which called for the establishment of a 30-member elected National Assembly and national elections in November of that same year.

The political détente between the Al Khalifa family and the disparate forces of civil society unraveled just two years later. The role of the National Assembly was short-lived, and convened for only two sessions before it was forcibly dissolved by the Amir in 1975 for refusing to ratify the Decree Law on State Security Measures (State Security Law), which allowed the arrest and detention of up to three years without trial of anyone suspected of posing a threat through undefined “acts” or “statements” to Bahrain's internal or external security. When asked why the National Assembly had been disbanded, Minister of Information Muhammad Ibrahim al-Mutawa’a replied that “it hindered the government” and that it would be restored “once we feel that we need it, when it is suitable for our society and development.”

The State Security Law was implemented by force along with a decree that postponed elections of the National Assembly, suspended 40 constitutional articles pertaining to the National Assembly, and transferred legislative powers to the Amir and his Council of Ministers. Subsequently, no new elections were held for the National Assembly which remained dissolved for 27 years until 2001 when a new constitution was drafted under the auspices of the Amir's successor, and current King of Bahrain Hamad bin Isa Al Khalifa.

The Amir's unchecked authority by the National Assembly gave him liberty to appoint members of the Al Khalifa family to key political positions in the Bahraini government, including Prime Minister, and the ministers of Interior, Defense, Foreign Affairs and Justice. Political parties were illegal, and although the constitution guaranteed basic human rights, new decrees that undermined the authority of the constitution severely limited freedoms of speech, religion, press, rights to public and private assembly, and rights of persons deprived of liberty. The State Security Law along with Amiri Decree No. 7 of 1976 established a State Security Court where most due process protections were absent and violated human rights standards of the Universal Declaration of Human Rights, as well as domestic codes in Bahrain's own legislation, like its 1966 Code of Criminal Procedure.

== Revocation of political and civil liberties ==
The former government of Bahrain developed a pattern of systemic human rights violations against citizens who raised demands for the reinstitution of the national constitution and the reconvening of the National Assembly, both of which were abolished under the State Security Law. Arbitrary arrests, coerced “confessions” under duress, pre-trial detention, unfair trials, and legal introduction of capital law offences were widespread, especially towards the majority Shia population of Bahrain.

In 1976, the Bahraini government instituted a new penal code that nullified many of the civil liberties and political rights protected under the 1973 Constitution and effectively criminalized a wide range of nonviolent political activities. Over the subsequent two decades, more decrees followed that further undermined fundamental political and civil rights. Bahrain's citizens were prone to search and seizure, or incarceration without charge or trial for speaking out publicly in a manner that the government considered hostile or critical. All internal and external communications with Bahraini citizens were monitored, political parties and organizations were proscribed, freedom of assembly required authorization that was rarely given, and the state controlled the press by censorship of domestic political material or any mention of Bahrain's neighboring countries.

By the end of the 1970s the leftist and secularist national opposition had been crippled by waves of arrests and forced exile. The Iranian Revolution of 1979 incited an empowering and enthusiastic response amongst the Shia population, which manifested itself into oppositional organizations like the Islamic Front for the Liberation of Bahrain but also in a more generalized sense against a government with a strong sectarian animus with regard to its well-being and empowerment. In 1981, 73 people were arrested by the government on charges of plotting to overthrow the state with the support of Iran, and initiated an influx of accusations against citizens allegedly involved with international terrorist organizations or extremist groups tied to Iran's government. The Bahraini government consistently dismissed sectarian unrest as the work of Hezbollah militants instigated and supported by Iran. Members of Bahrain's Shia community were systematically targeted in peaceful protests and unprovoked gatherings like funeral processions. The brutality with which authorities sought to quell uprisings was characterized by the repeated use of live ammunition to disperse crowds, and the consequent killing of unarmed civilians.

Following the Gulf War in 1991, a climate of improved human rights allowed for several citizens in exile to return to Bahrain and at least twenty prisoners convicted for their involvement in Bahrain's alleged coup attempt were released. This period of acquiescence was short-lived as widespread discontent in the continued absence of political and civil rights persisted and the government remained idle. In January 1993, a petition requesting new dialogue on restoring democratic rights was signed by leading Sunni and Shia personalities and submitted to the Amir but was met with a negative response. Two months prior to this petition, the Amir called for the establishment of a Majlis al Shura (Upper House); a placebo democratic body whose 30 members were appointed by the government and had no legislative powers. The Council still exists today under Bahrain's executive branch, where members are appointed and play a more functional role as a parliamentary upper-house.

In December 1994, protestors took to the streets demanding the restoration of democratic rights and the reconvening of the National Assembly. The Bahraini government responded by ignoring the demands and stifled calls for political change through rampant human rights violations. Thousands of men, women and children (as young as nine and ten years of age) were detained in a ten-month period between December 1994 and October 1995 under arbitrary accusations under the State Security Law. At least 100 were subsequently charged and convicted to terms of imprisonment, and in one case death. Two prisoners died while in police custody. Police forces and riot police were deployed against protestors and used violent means to disperse crowds. By 1995, ten confirmed deaths of Bahraini nationals presented circumstances that suggest they may have been extrajudicially executed, and at least twenty Bahraini nationals were exiled or denied entry when trying to return to the country.

== Torture ==
Torture remained rife in Bahraini prisons under the State Security Law and was most often conducted in the initial phases of detention against persons undergoing interrogation. In addition to extracting “confessions” from suspects during these interrogations, torture was a method employed to obtain signatures from detainees to renounce political affiliations, desist from anti-government activities in the future, or force their cooperation with authorities by reporting activities of others, namely, political opponents. Statements from former political detainees indicate that common forms of torture included: physical beatings, psychological abuse, sexual molestation, threats against the detainee's family and friends, and insults and humiliation towards the detainee and the Shia faith.

The Bahraini government failed to release the names of individuals who were arrested or the locations where they were detained. The vast majority of these individuals were denied defense attorneys or access to family members during their detention, and were tried privately by the government's State Security Court, where most due process protections were absent. No efforts were made to investigate allegations of torture or the deaths of demonstrators for reform. The Bahraini government continued to deny human rights organizations like Amnesty International or Human Rights Watch entry to the country for official information-gathering trips to investigate allegations of torture and human rights abuses.

The Bahraini government continually denied that forces under its authority committed widespread violations of human rights, that it remained within the legal boundaries with regard to arrest and judicial procedures, and that detainees received fair trials and treatment while in custody. The government also denied that it sanctioned any form of torture or physical abuse in any manner. The government legitimized its strong-arm tactics by citing incidents of violence committed against security forces and acts of sabotage perpetrated by “extremist elements.” Bahrain's Ambassador to the United States in 1997 reaffirmed his government's position, noting that the human rights “allegations made against Bahrain originate[d] from a very small, but skillful group of fundamentalist zealots and extremists, who [were] connected to terrorists in Bahrain.” No evidence was produced by the government to support these statements or others proving foreign involvement in Bahrain's domestic affairs as the source of domestic tensions or as justification for the manner in which authorities handled political unrest. Furthermore, there is no evidence that persons responsible for condoning acts of torture were disciplined for those acts. The current government introduced an Amnesty Decree that prevents impunity for crimes committed under the former constitution. To date, no alleged perpetrator has been tried for torture or ill treatment even though the practice of torture in Bahrain during the 1980s and 1990s has been well documented.

== Death of the Amir and abolition of the State Security Law ==
Following the death of Sheikh Isa bin Salman Al Khalifa in 1999, his son, Sheikh Hamad bin Isa Al Khalifa ascended to the throne as Amir. Shortly after his succession, Sheikh Hamad embarked on a new era of democratic reform, and by November 2000, established a committee to draft a blueprint to transform Bahrain from a hereditary emirate to a constitutional monarchy within two years. A resulting "National Action Charter" was presented to the Bahraini public in the country's first comprehensive referendum vote since the dissolution of Parliament in 1974, where 98.4% of voters overwhelmingly endorsed the charter. On February 5, 2001, Sheikh Hamad issued a Decree of Amnesty that pardoned all political prisoners indicted for state security crimes whether they were detained, facing charges, or convicted either in Bahrain or while exiled abroad. The Amnesty Decree enabled all citizens involved in political and security cases during the security state era to return to Bahrain without having to face charges, resulting in the repatriation of hundreds to the country. On October 21, 2010, the Bahraini government reported that 43 Amnesty Decrees Laws have been issued since 2001 pardoning 2,639 convicts indicted for involvement in terror or state security cases. Following the implementation of the February 5 Amnesty Law, Sheikh Hamad officially abolished the State Security Law and State Security Courts that were implemented during his father's rule. One year later in February 2002 after the national referendum, Sheikh Hamad pronounced Bahrain a constitutional monarchy and changed his title from Amir to King.

== Reemergence of human rights violations and allegations of torture ==
In February 2010, Human Rights Watch hosted a news conference during the release of its report on recent allegations of torture in Bahrain. The report indicated that Bahrain had successfully ended the use of torture for a good part of the last decade but raised concerns over a recent lack of interest for the government to investigate newly documented cases of abuse. Since the release of this report, hundreds of young men and 23 more prominent citizens, including four Shia clerics were arrested just weeks before the country's parliamentary elections on charges of spreading false information, inciting violence, fomenting terrorism or plotting the government's overthrow. Independent observers reckon that the accusations of torture against those who have been arrested are credible and believe that the government is overreacting without a shred of evidence to support that the opposition is plotting to overthrow the current government. According to an August 2010 article featured in The Economist, “Rising sectarian tension, the government’s overreaction to the protests and the blatant harassment of opposition parties, particularly the main Shia-dominated one, are all tarnishing Bahrain’s reputation as a fledgling if limited democracy.”
