= 1973 Constitution of Bahrain =

First constitution of Bahrain

The Constitution of the State of Bahrain was the first constitution of Bahrain. It was in effect from December 1973 to August 1975.

== Background and drafting ==
On December 16, 1971, the day Bahrain formally became independent of the United Kingdom (Bahrain technically gained its independence earlier in the year, on August 15), Shaykh Isa ibn Salman announced that the country would have a constitutional form of government. Six months later, he issued a decree providing for the election of representatives to a Constituent Assembly, charged with drafting and ratifying a constitution. The assembly was to consist of twenty-two elected delegates plus twenty additional members, including eight delegates appointed by the emir and the twelve members at the time of the Council of Ministers. The election, which was held in December 1972, was the first national election in Bahrain's history. The electorate was restricted to native-born male citizens aged twenty years and older.

The relative openness of political debate permitted during the election campaign for the twenty-two contested Constituent Assembly seats encouraged individuals dissatisfied with the lack of democratic rights to demand more civil liberties. The primary focus of concern was the 1965 Law of Public Security, a series of three emiri decrees that authorized the ruler to maintain indefinitely a virtual state of emergency in order to protect national security from suspected foreign and domestic enemies. A group of mostly university-educated professionals, led by Abd al Aziz Shamlan, unsuccessfully petitioned the emir to rescind the law's harshest provisions, especially those pertaining to arrest and detention. They believed these measures had been used arbitrarily to silence dissent and peaceful opposition. Several women's groups also organized to protest the exclusion of women from the franchise. They presented a petition to the emir requesting support for extending voting rights to female citizens, but they failed to receive a positive response.

The Constituent Assembly was in session during most of 1973 drafting the constitution.

== The Constitution ==
The constitution, enacted by emiri decree in December 1973, contained 108 articles. It provided for an advisory legislative body, the National Assembly, consisting of thirty members elected for four-year terms, plus all the members of the Council of Ministers whose terms were not fixed, as ex officio members. The assembly was not empowered to initiate or enact legislation, but it was authorized to give advice and consent to laws proposed by the Council of Ministers. The assembly had the right to question individual ministers about policies and to withdraw confidence from any minister except the prime minister. The constitution stipulated that the emir could dissolve the assembly at his discretion, provided he made public the grounds for so doing. If the assembly were dissolved by decree, new elections had to take place within two months or the dissolution would be invalidated and the dismissed members reinstated.

== Election under the 1973 Constitution and suspension of the 1973 Constitution ==
The 1973 Bahraini general election was the only election held under the 1973 Constitution.

The emir dissolved the National Assembly in August 1975, citing its inability to cooperate with the government. Although the constitution stipulated that new elections had to take place within two months of a dissolution, this did not occur. One year later, in August 1976, Shaykh Isa ibn Salman announced that the National Assembly would remain dissolved indefinitely.

The country was governed under emergency laws from 1975 to 2002, when the 2002 Constitution of Bahrain was promulgated.
