= 1973 Bahraini general election =

- 12 December 1973

30 of the 44 seats in the National Assembly
- Turnout: 78.40%

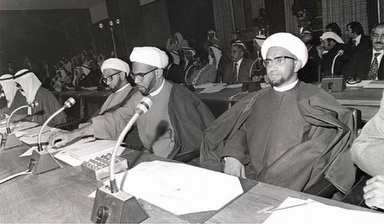
The religious block in Parliament, showing from right to left: Sheikh Abdul Amir al-Jamri, Abbas Al-Rayes and Ayatollah Isa Qassim

General elections were held in Bahrain for the first time on 12 December 1973. 30 of the 44 seats in the unicameral National Assembly were contested, the other 14 were ex officio. Out of the 24,883 registered voters—all of whom were male—19,509 cast a ballot, giving a voter turnout of 78%.

Two distinct political blocs amongst the elected members; the "People's Bloc" consisted of eight Shia and Sunni members elected from urban areas and associated with left-wing and nationalist organizations, including the Popular Front for the Liberation of Bahrain, the National Liberation Front – Bahrain or the Baathist movement. The 'Religious Bloc' was made up of six Shia members mostly from rural constituencies. The remaining members were independents with shifting positions.

== Electoral system ==
The elections were held under the 1973 constitution. The 44-seat National Assembly had thirty members elected by a franchise restricted to male citizens, with an additional 14 ministers of the royally-appointed government becoming ex officio members.

== Elected members ==
The elected members of the 1973 National Assembly were:

Constituency	Elected Member	Bloc	Votes	Position
1	Rasool Al-Jishi		759	
1	Khalid Ibrahim Al-Thawadi		691	
2	Abdulhadi Khalaf		711	
2	Hassan Al Jishi		582	President
3	Mohammed Salman Ahmed Hammad		288	
4	Mohammed Abdullah Harmas		304	
4	Mohsin Hameed Al-Marhoon	People's	221	
5	Ali Saleh Al-Saleh		468	
6	Hamad Abdullah Abul		311	
7	Ali Ebrahim Abdul Aal		207	
8	Abdullah Ali Al-Moawada		580	
8	Jassim Mohammed Murad		596	
9	Ali Qasim Rabea	People's	573	
9	Mohammed Jaber Al-Sabah	People's	341	
10	Isa Hassan Al-Thawadi		557	
10	Ibrahim Mohammed Hassan Fakhro		488	
11	Khalifa Ahmed Al Bin Ali		388	Vice-president
12	Abdullah Mansoor Isa		650	
13	Mustafa Mohammed Al-Qassab	Religious	665	
13	Alawi Makki Alsharakhat		633	
14	Abdullah Al-Shaikh Mohammed Al-Madani	Religious	771	Secretary
15	Isa Ahmed Qasim	Religious	1079	
15	Abdul Amir al-Jamri	Religious	817	
16	Abbas Mohammed Ali	Religious	324	
17	Yousif Salman Kamal		359	
18	Abdul Aziz Mansoor Al-Aali		631	
19	Hassan Ali Al-Mutawaj	Religious	585	
19	Salman Al shaikh Mohammed	Religious	495	
20	Ibrahim bin Salman al Khalifa		572	
20	Khalifa Al Dhahrani		250	

== Aftermath ==
In 1975, the National Assembly was dissolved by the then ruler Sheikh Isa bin Salman Al Khalifa because it refused to pass the government-sponsored State Security Law of 1974. Isa subsequently refused to allow the Assembly to meet again or hold elections during his lifetime. The next parliamentary elections were held in 2002 after a gap of 27 years. During that period, Bahrain was run by the royally-appointed government under emergency laws.
