= Adnan Al-Qattan =

Bahraini Islamist and Sunni Muslim scholar

Sheikh Adnan Al-Qattan
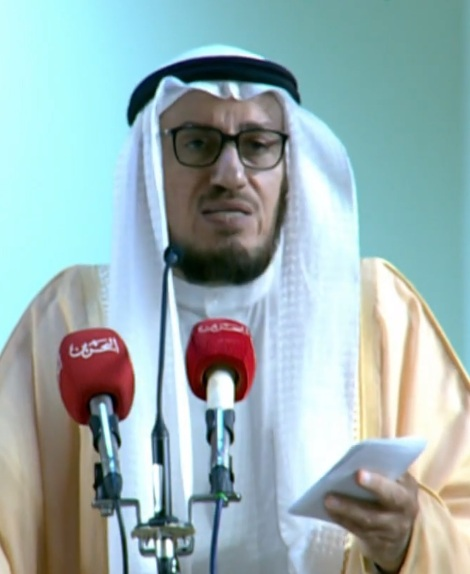
- Adnan al-Qattan as Imam, 14 May 2021

Personal life
- Born: Adnan bin Abdullah al-Qattan
- Occupation: Preacher, Judge

Religious life
- Religion: Sunni Islam
- Jurisprudence: Salafism

Adnan Abdullah al-Qattan (Arabic: عدنان عبدالله القطان) is the official imam and preacher of Al Fateh Grand Mosque in Bahrain and the head of the Bahraini delegation for the Hajj, taking care of the pilgrims and answering their needs.

== Education ==
Sheikh Adnan al-Qattan holds a master's degree in the Quran and Hadith from Umm al-Qura University in Mecca, and a bachelor's degree in Islamic law from the Islamic University in Medina.

== Views ==
Ever since the start of the Arab Spring, Adnan al-Qattan's rhetorics have been more oriented into politics and he has told the people protesting to "calm down and keep the stability of the country."

=== Bahrain ===
In April 2013, Sheikh Adnan al-Qattan called the participants of the Bahrain national dialogue to move away from the appeal of defamation and derogation.

=== Syria ===
Sheikh Adnan al-Qattan said that what is happening in Syria in this revolutionary period is one of the images of oppression and tyranny in the land. He stressed that the "duty of every Muslim who cares about the issue of his brothers in Syria is to share their concerns and sorrows, and be sad to what they suffered, and the greatest thing that can be provided to them is prayer until God raises the victims from this calamity and removes this sorrow". In another preach, the imam confirmed that the justice and freedom will surely come no matter how long-standing injustice will take place because "injustice does not last, and each oppressor has an end".

== Legal responsibilities ==
Sheikh Adnan al-Qattan is a legitimate major judge in the Court affiliated to the Ministry of Justice of the Kingdom of Bahrain. He contributed to the drafting of the Personal Status Law of the Ministry of Justice. In 2003, Sheikh Adnan al-Qattan told that the Sharia courts should immediately increase so as about the number of judges, and create an office of domestic reform along the lines of the Gulf Cooperation Council.

== Financial responsibilities ==
Sheikh Adnan Al-Qattan is a member of the Fatwa and Sharia board in many banks and financial institutions like Al Salam Bank, Bahrain Islamic Bank, Capivest Investment Bank, and Liquidity Management Center.

== Philanthropy ==
Sheikh Adnan al-Qattan is also Chairman of the Board of Trustees of the Royal Charity Organisation of the Kingdom of Bahrain where he collaborates with HM the King Hamad bin Isa Al Khalifa.

In 2011, the delegation from the Mission of the Kingdom of Bahrain for pilgrimage travelled to the city of Medina under Sheikh Adnan Al-Qattan as its head. Once there, the group visited the BMC hospital which is one of the best hospitals in the city. Within the visit to BMC Hospital, Sheikh Adnan al-Qattan met the Executive Director of the Hospital to sign a cooperation agreement in the advantage of bahraini pilgrims who can since then benefit from the medical treatment services of the hospital.

== See also ==
- Al Fateh Grand Mosque
- Abdullatif Al-Mahmood
