= 1996 Sitra attack =

1996 terrorist attack

- Location: Sitra, Bahrain
- Date: 14 March 1996
- Attack type: Firebombing
- Deaths: 7
- Injuries: unknown
- Perpetrator: Democratic Front for the Liberation of Palestine (alleged)

On 14 March 1996, a group of five armed terrorists threw Molotov cocktails into a restaurant in Sitra, Bahrain after pouring petrol there, killing seven Bangladeshi workers and destroying the restaurant while standing near the entrance and preventing people from escaping the fire.

== Aftermath ==
Bahrain's Prime Minister Sheikh Khalifa bin Salman al-Khalifa visited the scene after the attack. The Prime Minister ordered the victims' bodies to be repatriated to the Indian subcontinent as soon as possible and their families to be compensated. Seven people were arrested for the attack after several hundred people had been detained.

The attack was by far the most violent incident in Bahrain's modern history, which had recently been characterized by tension between the ruling Sunni Muslim family and Shiite Muslims, who form the majority of the population. In December 1994 demonstrations had degenerated into riots which targeted foreigners, particularly Pakistanis due to the large number of Pakistanis in Bahrain's security forces. Following a string of terror attacks in 1996, the Bahraini government later claimed that Iran was behind the terror campaign. In July, the State Security Court sentenced three Bahrainis to death for the attack.

The attack has been attributed to the Democratic Front for the Liberation of Palestine (DFLP) by academic Barry Rubin and the International Institute for Counter-Terrorism.
