= Isa Qasim =

Bahrani scholar and politician (born c. 1937)

Grand Ayatollah Isa Qasim
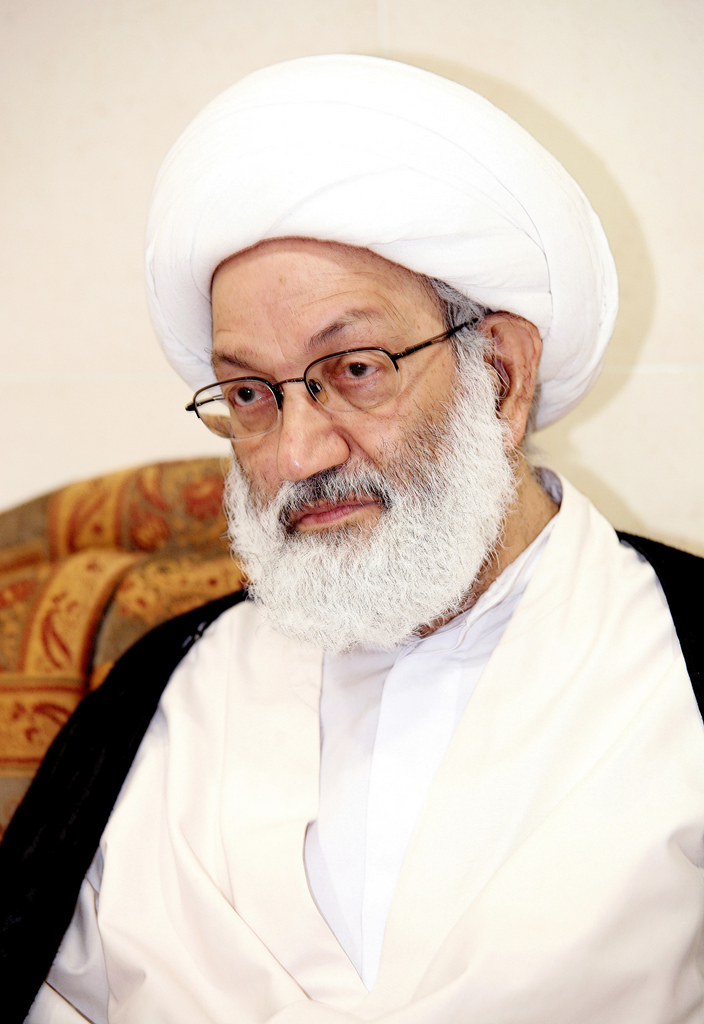
- Isa Qasim in 2007
- Born: Isa Ahmad Qasim; 1 January 1937 (age 89); Duraz, Bahrain
- Education: Qom Seminary
- Occupations: Religious leader, politician and former teacher
- Years active: 1961–2017
- Political party: Al Wefaq

Isa Ahmad Qasim (Note: Arabic: عيسى أحمد قاسم) (born 1 January 1937) is a Bahraini Shia Islamic cleric and political leader who is regarded as the country's most influential Shia figure. A Grand Ayatollah, Qasim is the spiritual leader of Al Wefaq, Bahrain's biggest opposition society and is also the founder and leader of the Islamic Enlightenment Institution.

Qasim has been a vocal critic of the Sunni-led Bahraini government and led opposition to King Hamad bin Isa Al Khalifa. Qasim participated in the 2011 Bahraini uprising and was stripped of his nationality in 2016. Qasim was sentenced to life in prison in 2026.

== Biography ==
Isa Qasim was born in 1937 to a fisherman in Duraz though some sources reported he was born either in 1940 or 1941. He attended Budaiya primary school where he was known for his intelligence and it was reported that he always scored the highest marks. After finishing primary school and with his brother's aid he moved to Manama's secondary school. After graduating he worked as a teacher in Budaiya primary school where he remained until 1962.

== Religious activity ==
=== Religious study in 1960s ===
During his academic study, Isa Qasim went to Noaim at night to study Islamic teachings under sheikh Abdul-Hussain Al-Heli (Died in 1957). In 1962, Qasim began studies at the Najaf Religious Institute in Iraq, where he studied under many Marja's including Mohammad Baqir al-Sadr. He remained in Al-Najaf for 4 years then returned to Bahrain where he worked as a teacher in Al-Khamis intermediate school for 2 years before returning to Al-Najaf. In Al-Najaf, he met with other Shia Bahraini scholars including: Sheikh Abdul Amir al-Jamri, Sheikh Abdulla Al-Guraifi, Sheikh Abdulla Al-Madani and Sheikh Abbas Al-Rayes. All of them were from the same generation and knew each other well even before going to Al-Najaf, due to being partners as students or teachers.

=== Religious study in 1990s ===
At the beginning of the 1990s, Isa Qasim traveled to Qum in Iran to continue his religious studies. He studied on the hands of some of the highest-ranking Marjas including: Ayatollah Sayed Mahmood al-Qashimi, Ayatollah Sayed Kadhem al-Haeri and Ayatollah Fadhel al-Lankarani. In March 2001, he finished his studies, gained the title of Ayatollah and returned to Bahrain on March 8, 2001.

=== Friday sermon ===
Isa Qasim has been leading Friday sermon in Duraz mosque since his return to Bahrain in 2001. Thousands of worshipers attend this sermon weekly.

== Political activity ==
=== 1970s elections ===
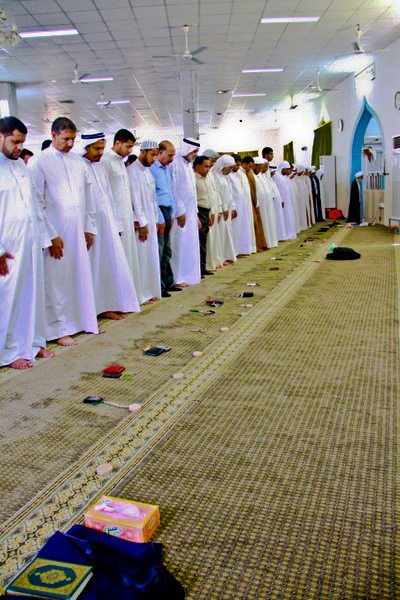
Isa Qasim leading Friday Sermon in Duraz on 25 March 2011.

In 1971, Isa Qasim was chosen by religious leaders to be a candidate for elections while he was still in Iraq. At first he refused and wanted to stay in Iraq to finish his studies and stay away from politics, but just four days before candidates registration was closed, his brother Mahdi traveled to Iraq and brought him back along with his wife and kids. In 1972, he was elected for the Constituent assembly where he had big influence in including parts of the Islamic sharia in the 1973 constitution.

=== Formation of the religious block ===
In 1972, a 'religious block' was formed which included Isa Qasim, Sheikh Abdul Amir al-Jamri, Sheikh Abdulla Al-Madani, Sheikh Abbas Al-Rayes, Suleiman Al-Mubarak and Hassan Al-Motawwaj. At first they were nine members, but later three of them joined the 'Independent middle' block. During elections the block adopted a wide program including: supporting the labor's union & demands, forbidding trade of Alcoholic drinks and separating men and women in higher education (like primary, intermediate and secondary schools). They also called for prohibiting male doctors from treating females (especially in pregnancy) as well as other demands that are part of the Islamic customs.

In 1973, Qasim was elected a member of Bahrain's parliament, the National Assembly of Bahrain, until the parliament was dissolved in August 1975. He gained 1079 votes making him the biggest winner in the fifteen constituency.

=== 1996 coup plot allegations ===
The Bahraini government alleged that Qasim was implicated in a coup plot in 1996. They accused him to be the head of an Iran-based group called Hizbullah Bahrain, who were said to be behind a conspiracy to overthrow the Bahraini government. After tortures, some of those convicted of the conspiracy “confessed to receiving financial help and military training from Iran and Lebanon”. This claim was described by Human Rights Watch as lacking any credibility. Their confessions were broadcast on Bahrain TV. Many Bahraini Shias denied that Isa Qasim was involved in any plot and claimed that the confessions were taken under torture.

=== Role in Al Wefaq ===
Isa Qasim is often referred to as the spiritual leader of Al Wefaq. However, he has no formal position within the party and has attained this status as a result of his religious seniority. Some see this as a way for Qasim to avoid “submitting his opinions to internal democratic debate so that he can retain the final decision without paying the price for it”. Qasim rarely makes his decisions in public.

=== Views on the 2026 Iran war ===
On May 15, 2026, Isa Qasim described Ali Khamenei as a capable leader who had helped preserve Muslim unity. He described the current war as a conflict between “ignorance” and “faith”, placing the United States and Zionism on the side of ignorance. He described Iran as an example of a just Islamic government and the Resistance Front as representing the side of faith. On May 23, 2026, Qasim criticized the US attack on Iran and the attempt to overthrow the Islamic Republic. He said that Iran had the right to defend itself against the attack and questioned whether it was fair to blame the Islamic Republic for defending itself.

Also, following the arrest and trial of 69 Bahraini Shiite clerics on charges of overthrowing the constitutional regime, promoting the Iranian theory of wilayat al-faqih, and maintaining ties with the Islamic Revolutionary Guard Corps, Sheikh Isa Qassem was also sentenced to life imprisonment in absentia by the Bahraini Supreme Criminal Court on November 16, 2026. In response to the ruling, he called it unjust and said that the people of Bahrain will never surrender to a government that is based on force and enslavement policies.

== Involvement in the Bahraini uprising (2011) ==
Throughout the Bahraini uprising (2011–present) Qasim has been a vocal critic of the government and has led the opposition to King Hamad bin Isa Al Khalifa. "Bahrain’s Sunni rulers have treated Shiite anti-government protesters seeking greater rights in the Gulf kingdom as enemies of state." He said on September 16 during Friday Sermon. "the politics of fear and the Sunni rulers’ refusal to reform has strengthened the resolve of Bahrain's Shiite majority. He added.

=== Deployment of Peninsula Shield Force ===
On 14 March, the Gulf Cooperation Council (GCC) agreed to deploy Peninsula Shield Force troops to Bahrain. Saudi Arabia deployed about 1,000 troops with armored support, and the United Arab Emirates deployed about 500 police officers. The forces crossed into Bahrain via the King Fahd Causeway. The purported reason of the intervention was to secure key installations. The opposition reacted strongly, calling it an "occupation".

In response to the deployment of the GCC troops in Bahrain. Isa Qasim, criticised al-Khalifa's claims that the mobilisation of GCC troops is a broader effort to ensure regional stability, rather than what Qasim considers to be Sunni entrenchment and a veiled challenge to Shia representation in the government. On 18 March he said the Peninsula Shield Force had "made a big mistake" and he "would have been proud" if it instead went "to help our brothers in Gaza".

== Loss of nationality ==
On 20 June 2016, a week after the government of Bahrain suspended the main Shia opposition party al-Wefaq, Isa Qasim was stripped of his Bahraini citizenship. An interior ministry statement accused Sheikh Isa Qasim of “using his position to serve foreign interests" and “promote sectarianism and violence". Announcing the move to strip him of his Bahraini citizenship, the interior ministry said the cleric had "adopted theocracy and stressed the absolute allegiance to the clergy". It added that he had been in continuous contact with "organisations and parties that are enemies of the kingdom". Bahrain's citizenship law allows for the cabinet to revoke the citizenship of anyone who "causes harm to the interests of the kingdom or behaves in a way inimical with the duty of loyalty to it". Due to persecution at the hands of the Sunni regime, in December 2018 he relocated to Iran.

=== Reaction ===
- After the decision was announced, several hundred Qasim supporters gathered outside his house in the mostly Shia village of Diraz, carrying posters and chanting religious slogans.
- Hussein Abdulla, executive director of campaign group Americans for Human Rights and Democracy in Bahrain, called the move to revoke his citizenship "an unprecedented low for the Bahraini authorities".
- Sayed Alwadaei, director of advocacy at the British-based campaign group Bahrain Institute for Rights and Democracy, said in a statement that the decision would "escalate tensions on the streets and may even lead to violence".
- Saudi Arabia's Council of Senior Scholars welcomed the actions taken by Bahrain.
- Hezbollah, the Lebanese Shia group, denounced the decision on its Al-Manar TV network, which called on Bahrainis to "express their indignation" and said the move against the cleric would have "grave consequences".
- Ali Larijani, Speaker of the Iranian parliament condemned the action, saying "this was an impolitic and quite an adventurous move by the Bahraini regime which assumed that by revoking the nationality of this prominent spiritual leader, it could lead the country's domestic political crisis toward tranquility" and "the Al-Khalifa regime must take a careful look at this historical record that clearly shows once a government starts threatening the influential figures of its nation with revocation of citizenship, it is taking its last breaths".
- In a statement published by Fars News Agency, Major-General Qasem Soleimani, commander of the Islamic Revolutionary Guard Corps Quds Force said: "The Al Khalifa [rulers of Bahrain] surely know their aggression against Sheikh Isa Qasim is a red line that crossing it would set Bahrain and the whole region on fire, and it would leave no choice for people but to resort to armed resistance."Al Khalifa will definitely pay the price for that and their blood-thirsty regime will be toppled."
- Spokesperson for the United States Department of State John Kirby said, "We are alarmed by the Government of Bahrain's decision to revoke the citizenship of prominent Shia cleric, Sheikh Isa Qasim" and "We remain deeply troubled by the Government of Bahrain's practice of withdrawing the nationality of its citizens arbitrarily, the overall precedent that this case could establish, and the risk that individuals may be rendered stateless".
- Human Rights Watch said the decision to strip the cleric of his citizenship "takes Bahrain into the darkest days" since the 2011 crackdown and "these actions should be met with serious consequences, not expressions of concern".
- The Supreme Leader of Iran, Ali Khamenei, said in a speech carried by state media, "This is blatant foolishness and insanity. When he still could address the Bahraini people, Sheikh Isa Qasim would advise against radical and armed actions" and "Attacking Sheikh Isa Qasim means removing all obstacles blocking heroic Bahraini youths from attacking the regime".

== Further persecution ==
On 16 July 2016, the head of public prosecution, Ahmed al-Dosari, said a Bahraini cleric would go on trial the next month on charges of “collecting funds illegally and money laundering.” Sources identified the cleric as Qasim. Regime controlled media last month reported an investigation was underway into a bank account of some $10 million in Qasim's name to “find the source of the funds and how they were being spent.”

== See also ==
- Abdul Amir al-Jamri
- Al Wefaq National Islamic Society
- Politics of Bahrain
- 1990s uprising in Bahrain
- Bahraini uprising (2011–present)
