= 1990s uprising in Bahrain =

1994–1999 uprising in Bahrain

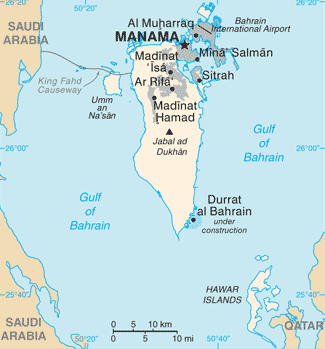
- A CIA WFB map of Bahrain.
- Date: December 17, 1994 – March 6, 1999
- Location: Bahrain
- Caused by: Dissolution of parliament
- Goals: Reinstatement of parliament
- Methods: Demonstrations; Civil resistance; Strikes
- Result: Democratic reforms; reinstatement of parliament

Parties
Leftist, Islamist, liberal political parties, and relatively small select militias: Islamic Front for the Liberation of Bahrain; Hezbollah – Bahrain	Government of Bahrain: Bahrain Defence Force; Special Security Force Command

Lead figures
Sheikh Abdul Amir Al-Jamri; Abdulwahab Hussain; Hasan Mushaima; Saeed al-Shehabi; Ali Salman; Abdullatif Al-Mahmood	Isa bin Salman Al Khalifa; Khalifa bin Salman Al Khalifa; Hamad bin Isa Al Khalifa; Ian Henderson

Casualties and losses
	1 soldier killed; 3+ police officers killed
- 40+ civilians killed (including one executed on charges of killing a soldier)

The 1990s uprising in Bahrain (Arabic: الانتفاضة التسعينية في البحرين) also known as the uprising of dignity (Arabic: انتفاضة الكرامة) was an uprising in Bahrain between 1994 and 1999 in which leftists, liberals and Islamists joined forces to demand democratic reforms. The uprising ended after Hamad bin Isa Al Khalifa became the Emir of Bahrain in 1999 and a referendum on 14–15 February 2001 massively supported the National Action Charter. The uprising resulted in the deaths of around 40 civilians and at least one Bahraini soldier.

== Background ==
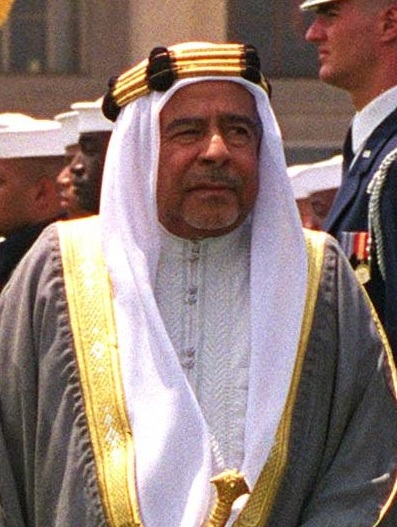
The Emir, Isa bin Salman Al Khalifa dissolved the parliament and suspended the constitution in 1975.

In 1971, Bahrain became independent from Britain and in 1973 the country had its first parliamentary election. However, two years later the constitution was suspended and the assembly dissolved by the Emir, Isa bin Salman al-Khalifa after it rejected the State Security Law. The act also known as "the precautionary law" was proposed by Ian Henderson. It gave police wide arresting powers and allowed individuals to be held in prison without trial or charge for up to three years for mere suspicion "that they might be a threat to the state". Starting in August 1975, widespread arrests were conducted including members of the dissolved parliament. The "ruthless system of repression" launched by Henderson lasted for over twenty five years. Repeated allegations of systematic torture, arbitrary arrests of thousands and assassinations made by opposition activists and human rights groups were denied by Henderson who said he "has never been involved in torture nor has he ever ordered his officers to torture those who have been arrested".

In 1992, a petition signed by 280 society leaders, including some of the dissolved parliament members called for the restoration of the national assembly. Initially, the government set up a thirty-member appointed "Shura council" assigned with "commenting" on government proposed legislation. Another petition the following month concluded that the newly formed council "does not replace the national assembly as a constitutional and legislative authority". A delegation of six members, half Sunnis and half Shias representing the petition organizers met with the Emir who told them Shura council "was all [they] could expect".

== Aims ==
Like other uprisings during the 1990s, the uprising's stated aims were for democratic reform, and it was considered as the first movement in the Arab world where leftists, liberals and Islamists joined forces on a common ground calling for restoration of the dissolved parliament and suspended constitution.

Although attempts were made to portray the uprising as a totalitarian coup aimed at imposing an Islamic fundamentalist ideology, the events and the moderate discourse of their leaders attracted support from many human rights organizations (such as Amnesty International, Human Rights Watch, Article 19, UN Human Rights Sub-Commission, etc.) as well as from members of parliament in the UK, France, USA and the EU. The final aim of the uprising was the reinstatement of the 1973 constitution and respect of human rights in Bahrain, while preserving plurality of opinions in society.

== Main events ==
The uprising began in June 1994, with a picket by unemployed people in front of the ministry of labour. Over 1,500 demonstrator tried to organize a sit-in front of Ministry of Labor protesting the increasing rate of unemployment which had reached 15 percent. Riot police dispersed them using tear gas. Similar incidents occurred in August and September. Another petition was launched, this time it was open to all citizens. Organizers said they collected over 20,000 signatures most of whom were Shia.

In November, hundreds of Shia protested against a charity marathon. The route of the marathon was through some Shia villages, who considered the female dressings offensive. Reportedly, some protesters threw stones on the marathon, which prompted security forces to conduct a number of arrests. The following month Ali Salman, a protest leader, was arrested after being accused of inciting the incident. The arrest sparked further protests and violence in Manama, Riffa and Sitra. Some protesters used Molotov cocktails to attack "police stations, banks and commercial properties". On the other hand, riot police used tear and rubber bullets, sometimes "fired at street level and from helicopters". It was also reported that police used live ammunition on some occasions.

By December, the number of detainees was between 500 and 600 according to the US Embassy. A number of opposition leaders, including Ali Salman were exiled in January 1995. Protests and arrests continued amid some government statements of releasing prisoners. In February the government said only 300 remain in prison, while activists said the number was as high as 2000. The level of violence and arrests increased again in March and April. Abdul Amir al-Jamri, the leader of the uprising was arrested on 1 April along with other protest leaders such as Abdulwahab Hussain and Hassan Mushaima.

One month after their arrest, the government started jail-house negotiations with opposition leaders. About twenty one-or-two-hour meetings were conducted in four months between activists one side and Henderson, his deputy; Adel Flaifel or Minister of Interior on the other side. An agreement named "the Initiative" was reached in which opposition leaders would calm people in exchange for releasing all of those not convicted in courts. The government reportedly agreed that at a later stage after establishment of security, it would start a political dialogue with opposition. Initially, protests paused, however they resumed after the government denied such an agreement existed.

In December 1995 and January 1996, two bombs exploded in a shopping mall and a hotel without causing any casualties. Opposition leaders were arrested. No charges were filed against them (as of May 2007). Bombings continued in the following months collecting the lives of eight people, including seven killed in the firebombing of a restaurant in Sitra. The number of deaths by this time reached twenty four, including several deaths while in police custody due to alleged torture as well as three security forces. In May, a protester was sentenced to death penalty for allegedly killing a policeman. During this period, arrests increased, especially among women and children.

In June, the government said it had detected a network called the "military wing of Hizb AllahBahrain". The government alleged it was backed by Iran and had caused the unrest. The claim that "Hizb Allah" existed in Bahrain was described by Human Rights Watch as lacking any credibility, however the report noted the influence of Iran during that period.

The uprising was characterized by extreme forms of suppression, riots, stoning and bomb attacks. Over forty people were killed, mostly by the security forces. Most of the events of the uprising took place in Shia villages and towns; there was a strong religious component in the violence. The rhetoric of the pro-government quarters attempted to stain the image of the uprising, but at the end, the situation had to improve following the longest ever uprising in the history of Bahrain.

== Hamad bin Isa Al Khalifa and the National Action Charter ==
The violence generally subsided after King Hamad bin Isa Al Khalifa carried out political reforms after he ascended to the throne in 1999. On 14 and 15 February 2001, the National Action Charter was overwhelmingly approved by Bahrainis, with 98.4% in favour.

== See also ==
- 2011 Bahraini uprising
- insurgency in Bahrain
- History of Bahrain
- Human rights in Bahrain
- Bahrain Freedom Movement
