= 1972 Bahraini Constituent Assembly election =

- 1 December 1972

22 of the 44 seats in the Constituent Assembly
- Registered: 22,363
- Turnout: 15,385 (88.5%)
	First party
Party	Nonpartisan
Seats won	22

Constituent Assembly elections were held in Bahrain on 1 December 1972. All candidates ran as independents. A total of 15,385 votes were cast (although not all constituencies were contested), giving a turnout of 88.5%. However, only 12.5% of the population—all of whom were male—were registered voters at the time.

The constituent assembly was charged with drafting and ratifying a constitution, following Bahrain's independence from Britain in 1971. The law drawn up by the government restricted the electorate to male citizens aged twenty years or over.

The assembly consisted of twenty-two delegates who were elected by the public, along with eight delegates appointed by the Amir, and the twelve members of the royally-appointed Council of Ministers in their ex-officio capacity. Mohammed Hasan Kamaluddin was the youngest member elected at the age of 31.

The constituent assembly and its election were regulated by Legislative Decrees No. 12 and 13 of 1972.

The Constituent Assembly drafted and ratified the 1973 Constitution of Bahrain.
