= Abdullatif Al-Mahmood =

Bahraini politician and doctor

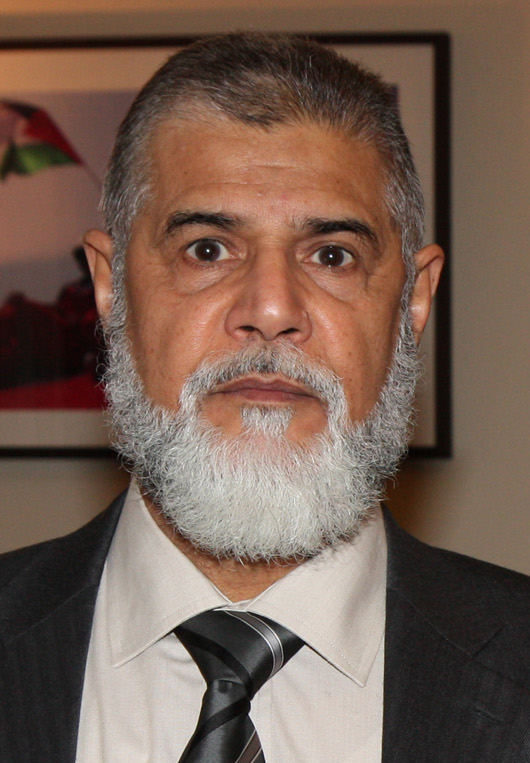
- Born: 8 May 1946 (age 80); Al-Hidd, Bahrain
- Occupation: Chairman of the Gathering of National Unity

Abdullatif Al-Mahmood (born May 8, 1946 in Hidd) is a Bahraini politician and doctor. He is of Sunni Arab origin.

He was a member of the Sunni opposition to the ruling Shiite Al Khalifa family in Bahrain. During the Arab Spring, he shifted his support to the ruling Al Khalifa family.

== Activism ==
In 1992, he signed on the uprising petition which had been demanding the return of Bahraini parliament deputy causing him to be detained for two weeks. Following his release, he withdrew from arguing that the petition had taken other goals. Afterwards, he disappeared from the political scene and worked as a doctor at the University of Bahrain.

== Return to politics ==
During the Bahraini protests that began on 2011, Abdullatif Al-Mahmood appeared as president of the pro-government Gathering of National Unity, led the Fateh Mosque assembly, and coordinated the Sunnis demands.

== See also ==
- Al Fateh Grand Mosque
- Adnan Al-Qattan
