= Constitution of Bahrain =

Bahraini Constitution

Overview
- Jurisdiction: Bahrain
- Ratified: 14 February 2002
- System: Unitary semi-constitutional monarchy

Government structure
- Branches: Three (Executive, Legislative and Judiciary)
- Head of state: King of Bahrain
- Chambers: National Assembly; Council of Representatives; Consultative Council
- Executive: Prime Minister of Bahrain; Cabinet of Bahrain
- Federalism: No
- Author: National Action Charter of Bahrain
- Signatories: Sheikh Hamad bin Isa Al Khalifa
- Supersedes: 1973 Constitution of Bahrain

Full text
- Constitution of the Kingdom of Bahrain (2002) at Wikisource

Bahrain has had two constitutions in its modern history. The first one was promulgated in 1973, and the second in 2002.

== 1973 Constitution ==
The constitution of 1973 was written shortly after Bahrain's independence from Britain in 1971. In 1972, the then ruler Shaikh Isa bin Salman Al Khalifa issued a decree providing for the election of a Constituent Assembly to draft and ratify a constitution. The electorate of the constituent assembly was native-born male citizens aged twenty years or older. The Constituent Assembly consisted of twenty-two elected delegates, plus the twelve members of the Council of Ministers and eight members directly appointed by Shaikh Isa.

The draft constitution provided for a unicameral legislature (the National Assembly) consisting of 44 members, 30 elected by "universal suffrage" (though franchise was restricted to males), plus 14 royally-appointed government ministers who were ex officio members. The constitution was enacted by decree in December 1973.

The 1973 Bahraini general election was the only election held under the 1973 Constitution, before it was abrogated by Shaikh Isa in 1975. The country was governed under emergency laws from 1975 to 2002.

== 2002 Constitution ==
After the death of the Emir Shaikh Isa bin Salman Al Khalifa in 1999, his throne was taken over by his son Shaikh Hamad bin Isa Al Khalifa. Seeking to bring an end to the 1990s uprising in Bahrain, he announced a new set of democratic reforms, including a promise to return to constitutional rule.

In 2001 Emir Hamad put forward the National Action Charter which would return the country to constitutional rule. However the opposition was opposed to the Charter's call for an amendment to the 1973 Constitution, changing the legislature from unicameral to bicameral. The Charter stated that "the legislature will consist of two chambers, namely one that is constituted through free, direct elections whose mandate will be to enact laws, and a second one that would have people with experience and expertise who would give advice as necessary." The opposition groups argued that this statement was too ambiguous, and remained opposed to the Charter. Also as part of the new Constitution the country was raised in status from an Emirate to a Kingdom.

Emir Hamad responded by holding a highly publicised meeting with the spiritual leaders of the Shia Islamist opposition. He signed a document clarifying that only the elected lower house of the parliament would have legislative power, while the appointed upper house would have a strictly advisory role. Upon this assurance, the main opposition groups accepted the Charter and called for a 'Yes' vote in the national referendum. The Charter was accepted in the 2001 referendum with 98.4% voting 'Yes' for it.

However, in 2002 Emir (now King) Hamad promulgated the 2002 Constitution, without any public consultation, in which both the elected and the royally-appointed chambers of parliament were given equal legislative powers, going back on his public promise of 2001. As a result, the parliamentary elections due to be held later that year were boycotted by four political societies; Al Wefaq, a Shia Islamist group, thought to be the most popular political society in the country, National Democratic Action, the largest Leftist political society, Islamic Action Society, a marginal Shia Islamist society, and the Nationalist Democratic Rally Society, a marginal Arab Nationalist society.

== Executive branch ==
According to Article 32 (b) of the 2002 Constitution, "executive authority is vested in the King together with the Council of Ministers and Ministers". The Council of Ministers (Cabinet) is appointed directly by the King (Article 33d). Previously under the Constitution of 1973, principal executive authority had been vested in the Emir until the state was declared a kingdom in 2002.

Bahrain has had two Prime Ministers since becoming independent, Khalifa bin Sulman al-Khalifa, the uncle of the reigning King Hamad bin Isa al-Khalifa, served in the position from 1970 until his death in 2020. Crown Prince Salman bin Hamad Al Khalifa assumed the position, following the death of his great-uncle. The Prime Minister is appointed by the King (or the Emir prior to 2002), and there is no requirement that they be a member of the nation's legislative body. During the term of Khalifa bin Salman Al Khalifa, the position of Prime Minister held significant influence, with Khalifa being placed in charge of the government and economy, while his brother, the Emir Isa bin Salman Al Khalifa, was primarily involved in diplomatic and ceremonial affairs. After the death of the Emir in 1999 and the accession of Hamad bin Isa Al Khalifa, the position lost some authority as Hamad divided power between the Prime Minister and his son, the Crown Prince Salman bin Hamad Al Khalifa, who would be appointed Prime Minister himself in 2020.

The King also has the power to appoint Deputy Prime Ministers. Historically, several Deputy Prime Ministers have served concurrently, and most have been members of the royal family. The first deputy prime ministers were appointed in November of 2002.

As of 2010, roughly half of the cabinet ministers have been selected from the Al Khalifa royal family, including the Minister of Defence, Minister of Interior, Minister of Foreign Affairs, Minister of Finance, and Minister of Justice and Islamic Affairs.

== Legislative branch ==
According to Article 32 (b) of the 2002 Constitution, "legislative authority is vested in the King and the National Assembly.

The National Assembly is bicameral with the lower house, the Chamber of Deputies, having 40 members elected in single-seat constituencies by universal suffrage for a four-year term. The upper house, the Shura Council, has 40 members appointed by the King of Bahrain. Among the members of the current Shura Council are representatives of Bahrain's Jewish and Christian communities as well as several women legislators.

The speaker of the National Assembly is from the appointed Shura Council.

All legislation must be passed by a majority in both the Chamber of Deputies and the Shura Council, and must be ratified by the King.

=== Political societies and elections ===
Political parties are illegal in Bahrain, de facto political parties operate and are known as 'political societies'

== Judicial branch ==
The Judiciary of Bahrain is divided into two branches: the Civil Law Courts and the Shari'a Law Courts. The Civil Law Courts deal with all commercial, civil, and criminal cases, as well disputes related to the personal status of non-Muslims. The Shari’a Law Courts have jurisdiction over all issues related to the personal status of Muslims.

Judges of the middle and lower courts are nominated by the Ministry of Justice and appointed by decree by the prime minister. The Supreme Judicial Council, chaired by the King, appoints the members of the Constitutional Court.

Many of the high-ranking judges in Bahrain are either members of the ruling family or non-Bahrainis (mainly Egyptians) with 2-year renewable contracts. To secure renewal of these contracts, judges may be prone to consider it necessary to take decisions not unfavourable to the wishes or interests of the Government.

== Administrative divisions ==
Bahrain is divided into four governorates for administrative purposes:

- Capital Governorate
- Muharraq Governorate
- Northern Governorate
- Southern Governorate

Each governorate has an appointed governor and an elected municipal council.

== See also ==
- National Action Charter of Bahrain
