= Mullah Attiya al-Jamri =

Bahraini khatib and poet (1899–1981)

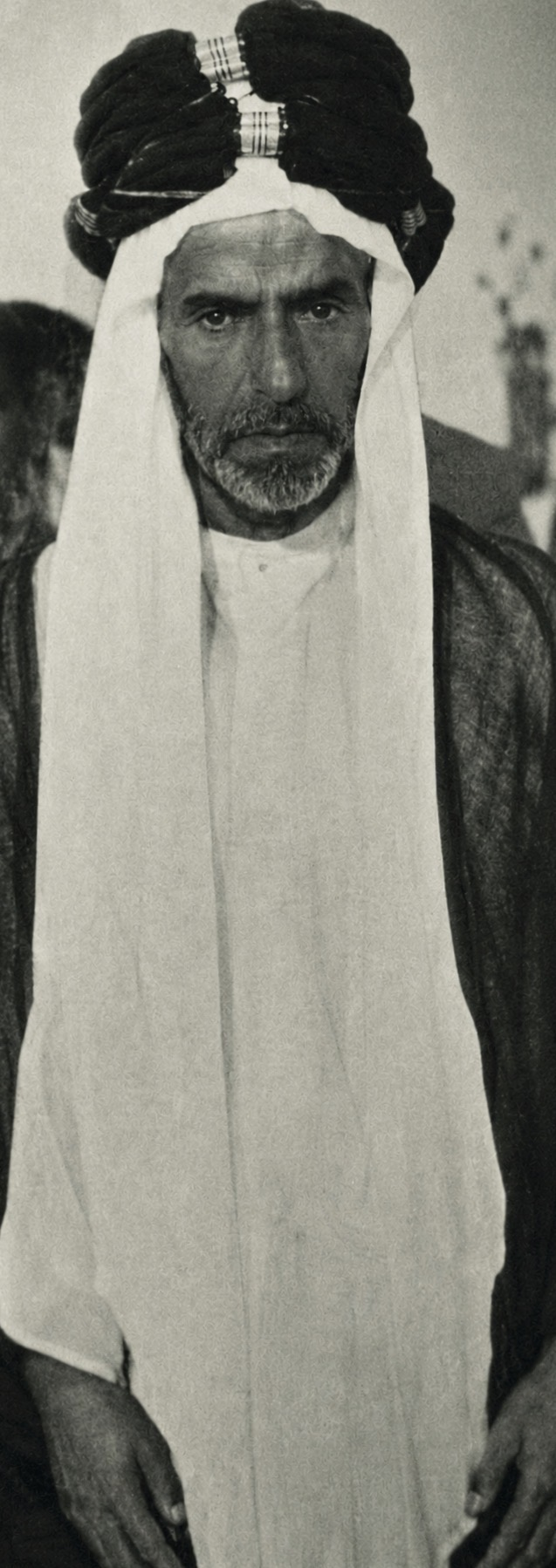
- Restored picture of Mullah Attiya al-Jamri.
- Born: c. 1899
- Died: 29 August 1981
- Occupations: khatib and poet
- Known for: poems

Mullah Attiya al-Jamri (Arabic: الملا عطية الجمري, c.1899 – 29 August 1981) was a Bahraini khatib and poet.

Researcher Clive Holes translated two of Al-Jamri's poems into books, one of which was distributed to 11,000 teachers from different schools in the UK which meant that the short story was read by over 330,000 students. Al-Jamri is well recognized in Bahrain, the Gulf and Iraq for his poems about Imam Hussain and for his unique methods of reading lamentation poems during the month of Muharram.
