= Al-Wasat (Bahraini newspaper) =

Arabic-language daily newspaper

- Al-Wasat logo
- Type: Daily newspaper
- Format: Broadsheet
- Founder: Mansoor Al-Jamri
- Publisher: Dar Al-Wasat for Publishing and Distribution BSC (c)
- Editor-in-chief: Mansoor Al-Jamri
- Founded: 7 September 2002
- Ceased publication: 4 June 2017
- Political alignment: Independent
- Language: Arabic
- Headquarters: Manama, Bahrain
- Circulation: 30,000
- Website: alwasatnews.com

Al-Wasat (Arabic: الوسط), also Alwasat, was an Arabic-language daily newspaper in Manama, Bahrain. Al-Wasat was generally regarded as the only independent newspaper in Bahrain. The newspaper ran for 15 years, during which it provided reporting unique to Bahrain.

The government of Bahrain forcibly closed the newspaper on 4th June 2017, in a move which Amnesty International termed an "all-out campaign to end independent reporting".

== History and profile ==
Al-Wasat was established in 2002. The newspaper was established after the early reforms adopted by King Hamad bin Isa. Allowing a key oppositional figure to establish this newspaper was seen as a key event in the opening up of society. Before Al-Wasat was established, Bahrain had only two Arabic newspapers, Akhbar Al Khaleej and Al Ayam, both of which were viewed as extremely pro-government. Its founders are Mansoor Al-Jamri and leading personalities from the Bahraini private sector. Al-Jamri was the editor-in-chief. He was temporarily forced out of his position between 3 April 2011 until 4 August 2011 during a government crackdown on journalists and the press during the Arab Spring.

Al-Wasat was the most popular newspaper in Bahrain and was generally regarded as the only daily that does not take a loyalist stand to the Bahraini government. It was the first Bahraini newspaper to reflect opposing viewpoints.

The paper was ranked as the top newspaper in terms of circulation and impact in the kingdom of Bahrain by the Pan-Arab Research Center in its survey in 2012. The paper was ranked of the top of index of credibility by the "Media Credibility Index" issued by Next Century Foundation in London on 5 May 2012. The paper's online version was the 15th most visited website for 2010 in the MENA region.

== Awards ==
Mansoor Al-Jamri is recipient of the CPJ International Press Freedom Awards in 2011 and the International Media Peace Award 2012.

In addition, the newspaper won several awards, including a European Award on 8 December 2011, MENA photojournalism award, UNICEF regional award for electronic media on 28 September 2011, the 15th strongest MENA newspaper on the Internet according to Forbes Middle East on 27 October 2010, Arab Journalism Award on 13 May 2010, Bahrain's electronic media, and Award on 13 March 2009.

Al Wasat was ranked top of the "Media Credibility Index" issued by the Next Century Foundation in May 2012. The paper was identified by the Pan-Arab Research Centre (PARC) in 2012 as the most widely read newspaper in Bahrain. Its editor-in-chief, Mansoor Al-Jamri also received the International Media Peace Award in London on 5 May 2012.

== Controversy ==
On 15 March 2011, the newspaper's printing office was attacked by mobs carrying knives and clubs. This came after recent 2011 Bahraini protests as some pro-government supporters attacked Al Wasat's oppositional views on recent events. The attack happened in the early hours of Tuesday morning after days of harassment of staff and journalists by some pro-government supporters.

Following a talk show on Bahrain television on 2 April 2011, which allegedly accused fabrications by the newspaper in its reporting of 2011 protests in Bahrain, Al-Wasat was suspended for one day and put under investigation by Bahrain's Information Affairs Authority. Al Wasat newspaper was accused of using old footage and articles when reporting on current events following the Bahraini protests. The Associated Press reported on 3 April that Al Wasat did not publish, following a message on state TV that the Information Ministry had ordered the paper to shut down. According to the state-run Bahrain News Agency, government officials again accused Al-Wasat of "unethical" coverage.

The day after the suspension, the board of directors of the paper announced they had accepted the resignation of Mansoor Al-Jamri as editor in chief, and Nouwehed as managing editor and head of local news (Aqeel Mirza). The new editor in chief would be Obaidaly AlObaidaly, a columnist for the paper. The newspaper restarted on 4 April 2011.

Al Jamri spoke to the Financial Times following these events and contended that allegations against his newspaper were part of a "sustained campaign" against this specific publication. He explained that there is a possibility of a double agent that was planted in the newspaper to spread fabrications. Bahrain's Information Affairs Authority filed a legal case based on Bahrain's law regarding press, printing and publishing. The General Prosecution summoned Mansoor Al Jamri, managing editor Walid Nouwehed and head of local news Aqeel Mirza for questioning. They were charged with publishing fabricated stories which "harmed public safety and national interests". Prosecutor General Ali bin Fadhl Al Bouainain indicated that they would stand trial when investigations have been completed.

Al Jamri explained in an interview with Al-Hurra Satellite that on 3 April 2011, an official ordered the newspaper's board to dismiss the editor-in-chief and key staff, two non-Bahraini staff were forcibly deported on 4 April 2011 and a detailed a series of official intimidation to the newspaper.

Karim Fakhrawi, one of the founders of Al Wasat, was detained on 3 April 2011 and according to the BICI report he died under torture on 12 April 2011.

The public announcement indicated that Fakhrawi died of kidney failure, but according to the committee to Protect Journalists, pictures showed bruises on his body.

On 4 August 2011, the board of directors reinstated Mansoor Al-Jamri back as editor-in-chief of the newspaper. The investors' general meeting held on 7 August 2011 reaffirmed the strategic direction of Al Wasat newspaper.

In June 2017 the newspaper was banned by the Bahraini government on accusations that it "sows division".

== See also ==
- List of newspapers in Bahrain
