= National Assembly (Bahrain) =

Legislative body of Bahrain

National Assembly المجلس الوطني البحريني al-Majlis al-watani

Type
- Type: Bicameral
- Houses: Consultative Council; Council of Representatives

Leadership
- Chairman of the Consultative Council: Salim bin Rashid Al-Khalifa since 15 December 2008
- Speaker of the Council of Representatives: Ahmed bin Salman Al-Musallam since 12 December 2022

Structure
- Seats: 80; 40 in the Consultative Council; 40 Representatives
- Consultative Council political groups: Independent (40)
- Council of Representatives political groups: Independent (40)

Elections
- Consultative Council voting system: Appointed by the King
- Council of Representatives voting system: Two-round system
- Last Council of Representatives election: 12 November 2022

Meeting place
- Manama

Website
- www.shura.bh/en/

The National Assembly (Arabic: المجلس الوطني البحريني, romanized: al-Majlis al-watani) is the bicameral legislative body of Bahrain. It consists of the 40 elected members of the Council of Representatives (the lower house) and the 40 royally-appointed members of the Consultative Council (the upper house). The joint session of the National Assembly is chaired by the Speaker of the Council of Representatives, or by the Speaker of the Consultative Council if the former is absent.

== National Assembly under the 1973 constitution ==
Under the 1973 Constitution (Article 43), the National Assembly was a single chamber parliament consisting of forty members elected by "universal suffrage". However, the then Amir, Shaikh Isa ibn Salman Al Khalifah decreed that women would not be considered as "universal suffrage" and were not allowed to vote in the 1973 parliamentary elections.

== History of the National Assembly of Bahrain ==
The first ever National Assembly in Bahrain was elected in 1973 under the statutes of the first constitution which was promulgated of that same year. In 1975, the Assembly was dissolved by the then Emir Shaikh Isa ibn Salman al-Khalifa because it refused to pass the government sponsored State Security Law of 1974. The Emir subsequently did not allow the Assembly to meet again or hold elections during his lifetime.

After the death of Isa ibn Salman al-Khalifa in 1999, his son Shaikh Hamad ibn Isa al-Khalifah, the new ruler of Bahrain promulgated the Constitution of 2002. That same year elections were held for the Council of Representatives and he appointed the members for the Consultative Council, forming the first National Assembly since 1975.

== See also ==
- Council of Representatives of Bahrain
- Consultative Council of Bahrain
- History of Bahrain
- Politics of Bahrain
- Constitution of Bahrain
- List of legislatures by country
