= National Action Charter of Bahrain =

Document approved in 2001 via referendum

25 February 2001
- Outcome: Nn

Results
Choice	Votes	%
Yes	191,790	98.41%
No	3,098	1.59%
Valid votes	194,888	99.30%
Invalid or blank votes	1,374	0.70%
Total votes	196,262	100.00%
Registered voters/turnout	217,579	90.2%

The National Action Charter of Bahrain (Arabic: ميثاق العمل الوطني في البحرين) is a document put forward by King Hamad ibn Isa Al Khalifah of Bahrain in 2001 in order to end the popular 1990s uprising and return the country to constitutional rule. It was approved in a national referendum in 2001, in which 98.4% of the voters voted in favor of the document.

== Referendum ==
The referendum took place on 14 and 15 February. Bahraini nationals over the age of 21 were eligible to vote. Voter turnout was 90.2%, with 98.41% voting in favour. With a total population of 620,500, around 35% voted in the referendum.

=== Results ===
Choice	Votes	%
For	191,790	98.41
Against	3,098	1.59
Total	194,888	100.00
Valid votes	194,888	99.30
Invalid/blank votes	1,374	0.70
Total votes	196,262	100.00
Registered voters/turnout	217,579	90.20
