= Outline of Bahrain =

Country in West Asia

The Flag of Bahrain

The Coat of arms of Bahrain

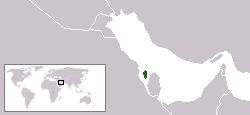
The location of Bahrain

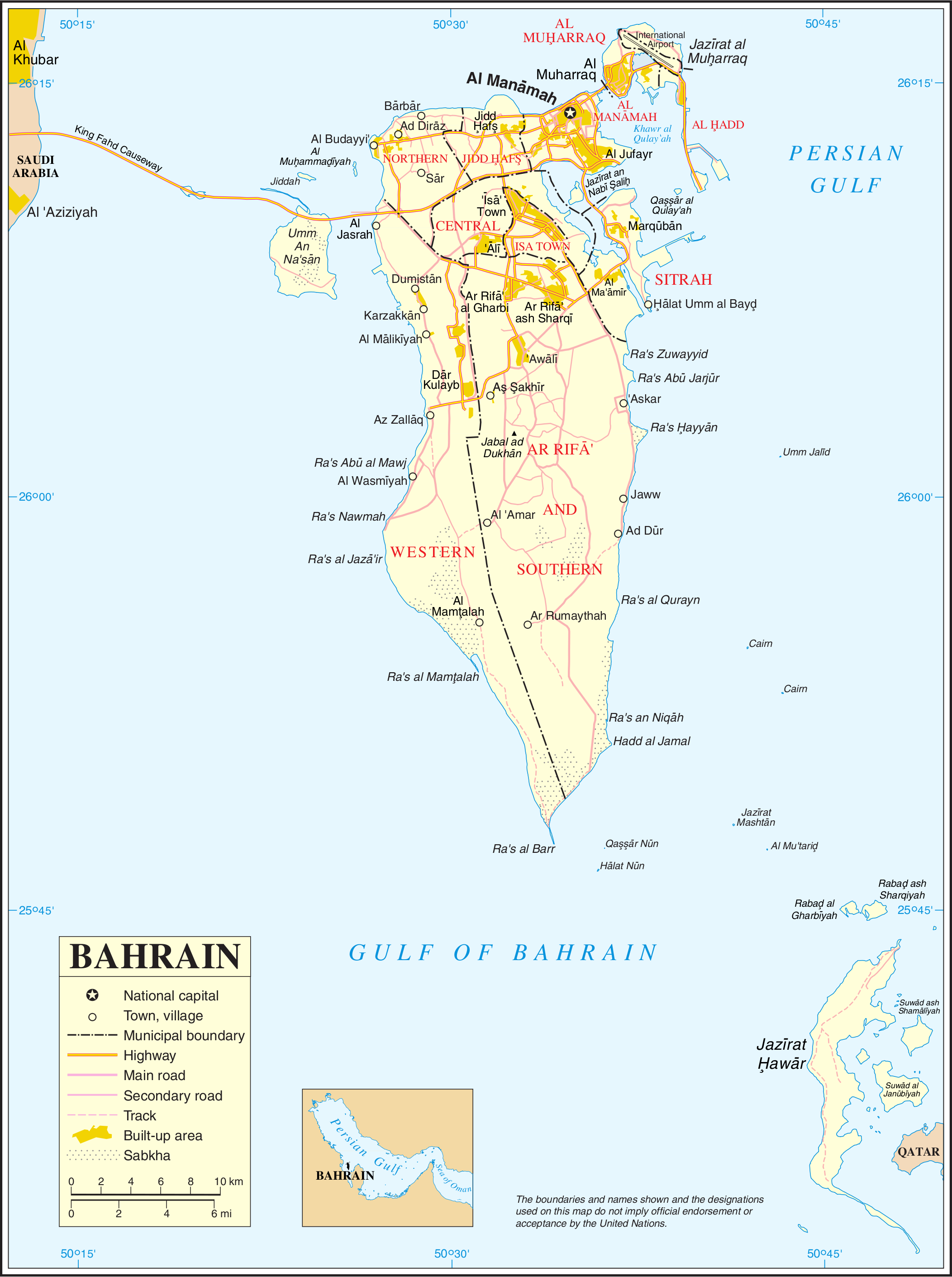
An enlargeable map of the Kingdom of Bahrain

The following outline is provided as an overview of and topical guide to Bahrain:

Bahrain, officially the Kingdom of Bahrain, is an island country in the eastern part of Arabian Peninsula in West Asia. Situated near the western shore of the Persian Gulf, the country comprises a small archipelago of 33 natural islands and an additional 50 artificial islands, centered on Bahrain Island, which makes up around 80 percent of the country's landmass. Bahrain is situated between Qatar and the northeastern coast of Saudi Arabia, to which it is connected by the King Fahd Causeway. The population is 1,588,670 as of 2024, of whom 739,736 (46.6% of the population) are Bahraini nationals, and 848,934 are expatriates (53.4% of the population). Bahrain spans some 760 square kilometres (290 sq mi) and is the third-smallest nation in Asia after Maldives and Singapore. The capital and largest city is Manama.

== General reference ==
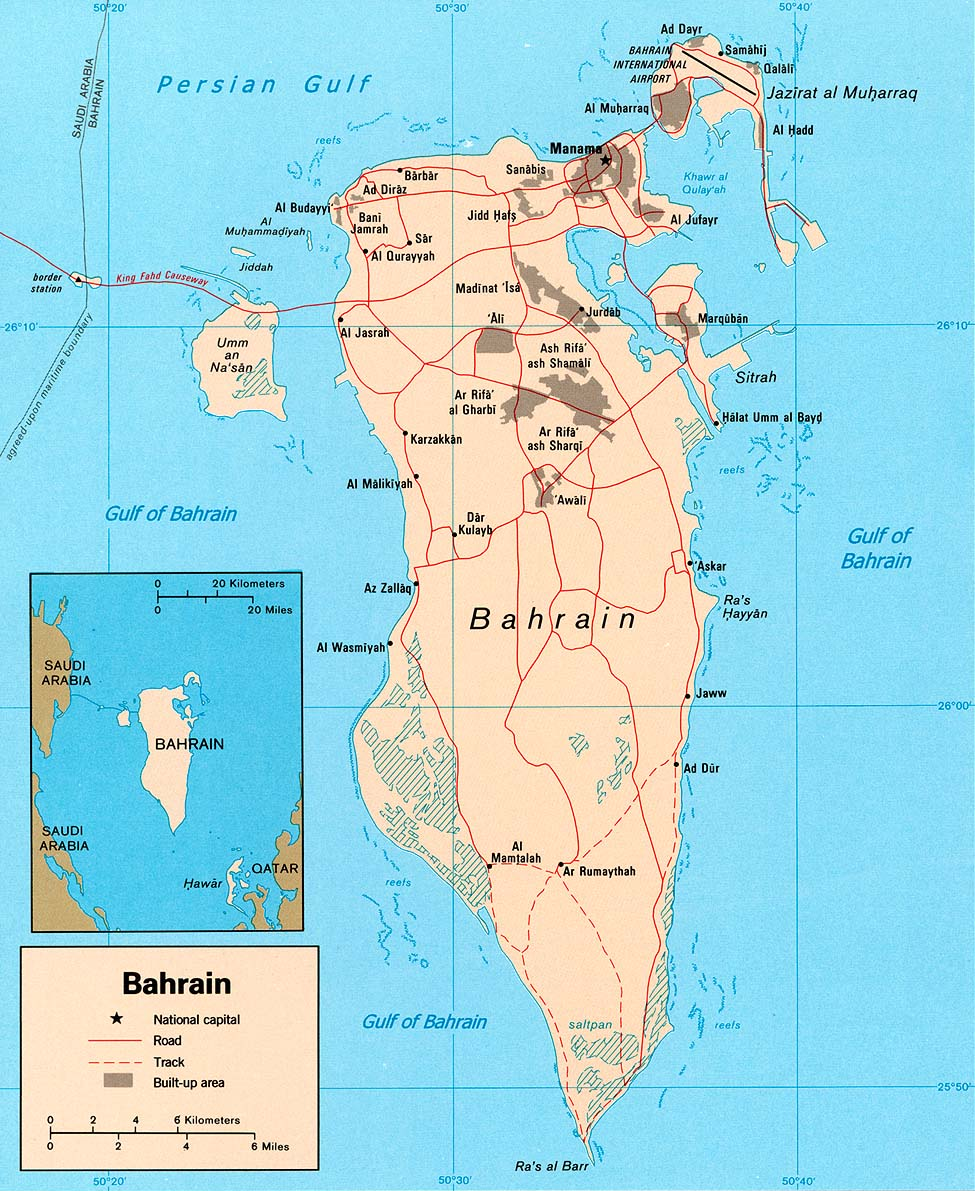
An enlargeable map of Bahrain

- Pronunciation:
- Common English country name: Bahrain
- Official English country name: The Kingdom of Bahrain
- Common endonym(s):
- Official endonym(s):
- Adjectival(s): Bahraini
- Demonym(s):
- Etymology: Name of Bahrain
- International rankings of Bahrain
- ISO country codes: BH, BHR, 048
- ISO region codes: See ISO 3166-2:BH
- Internet country code top-level domain: .bh

== Geography of Bahrain ==
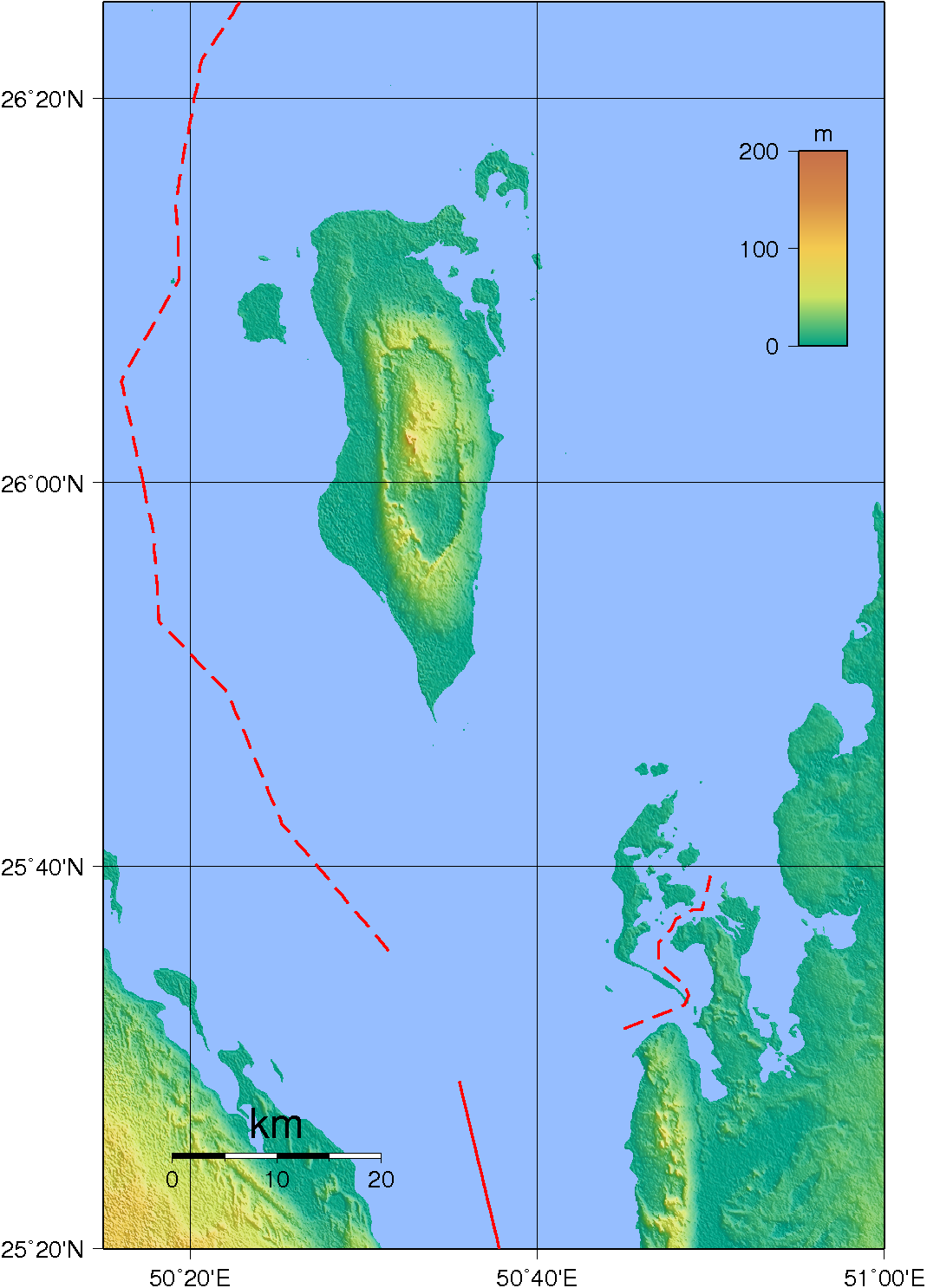
A topographic map of Bahrain

- Bahrain is: an island country
- Location:
  - Northern Hemisphere and Eastern Hemisphere
  - Indian Ocean
    - Arabian Gulf
  - Eurasia
    - Asia
      - Southwest Asia
  - Middle East
    - Gulf of Bahrain
  - Time zone: UTC+03
  - Extreme points of Bahrain
    - High: Jabal ad Dukhan 122 m (400 ft)
    - Low: Arabian Gulf 0 m
  - Land boundaries: none
  - Coastline: 161 km
- Population of Bahrain: 1,046,814(2007) - 154th most populous country
- Area of Bahrain: 665 square kilometres (257 sq mi) - 189th largest country
- Atlas of Bahrain

=== Environment of Bahrain ===
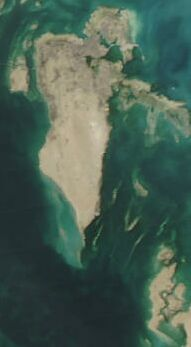
A satellite image of Bahrain

- Climate of Bahrain
- Renewable energy in Bahrain
- Geology of Bahrain
- Protected areas of Bahrain
  - Biosphere reserves in Bahrain
  - National parks of Bahrain
- Wildlife of Bahrain
  - Fauna of Bahrain
    - Birds of Bahrain
    - Mammals of Bahrain

==== Natural geographic features of Bahrain ====
- Beaches in Bahrain
- Gulf of Bahrain
- Hills in Bahrain
  - Mountain of Smoke
- Islands of Bahrain
  - Amwaj Islands
  - Hawar Islands
- Rivers of Bahrain
- World Heritage Sites in Bahrain
  - Bahrain Pearling Trail
  - Qal'at al-Bahrain – was the capital of the Dilmun, one of the most important ancient civilizations of the region. It contains the richest remains inventoried of this civilization, which was hitherto only known from written Sumerian references.

=== Regions of Bahrain ===
Former regions of Bahrain

- Western Region, Bahrain
- Al Wusta Region (Bahrain)
- Ash Shamaliyah Region

==== Administrative divisions of Bahrain ====
Map

Governorates of Bahrain

- Capital
- Muharraq
- Northern
- Southern

===== Cities in Bahrain =====
- List of cities in Bahrain
  - A'ali
  - Arad
  - Budaiya
  - Busaiteen
  - Ad-Dawr
  - Hamad Town
  - Al Hidd
  - Isa Town
  - Jidhafs
  - Madinat 'Isa
  - Malkiya
  - Manama
  - Al Muharraq
  - Riffa
- Former municipalities of Bahrain

=== Demography of Bahrain ===
Demographics of Bahrain

== Government and politics of Bahrain ==
Politics of Bahrain

- Form of government: constitutional monarchy
- Capital of Bahrain: Manama
- Elections in Bahrain
- Political parties in Bahrain
- 1981 failed coup d'état in Bahrain
- 1990s Uprising in Bahrain
- Adel Mouwda
- Al-Menbar Islamic Society
- Al Muntada
- Al Wefaq
- Alees Samaan
- Ali Ahmed
- Ali Mattar
- Ali Salman
- Asalah
- Bahrain Centre for Human Rights
- Bahrain Freedom Movement
- Bahrain Human Rights Society
- Bahrain Human Rights Watch Society
- Bahrain national dialogue
- Bahraini opposition
- Bandargate scandal
- Boycott Batelco
- Constitution of Bahrain
- Consultative Council of Bahrain
- Council of Representatives of Bahrain
- Economists Bloc
- Faisal Fulad
- Gay rights in Bahrain
- Islamic Front for the Liberation of Bahrain
- Jassim Al Saeedi
- Majeed Karimi
- Khalifa Al Dhahrani
- Lulwa Al Awadhi
- Mohammed Khalid
- National Action Charter of Bahrain
- National Assembly of Bahrain
- National Justice Movement
- Supreme Council for Women
- Women's political rights in Bahrain
- Workers Trade Union Law

=== Liberalism in Bahrain ===
- Al Muntada
- Sawsan Al Sha'er
- Haya Rashed Al-Khalifa
- Bahrain Human Rights Watch Society
- Economists Bloc
- We Have A Right
- Women's political rights in Bahrain

=== Political parties in Bahrain ===
- List of political parties in Bahrain
- Al Meethaq
- Al-Menbar Islamic Society
- Al Wefaq
- Asalah
- Baath Party
- Democratic Bloc
- Democratic Progressive Tribune - Bahrain
- Islamic Action Society
- National Action Charter Society
- National Democratic Action
- National Liberation Front - Bahrain
- Nationalist Democratic Rally Society

=== Bahraini politicians ===
- Adel Mouwda
- Ahmad Al-Thawadi
- Salman bin Hamad bin Isa Al Khalifa
- Alees Samaan
- Ali Ahmed
- Ali Mattar
- Ali Salman
- Tawfeeq Ahmed Almansoor
- Faisal Fulad
- Jassim Al Saeedi
- Khalid ibn Ahmad Al Khalifah
- Khalifa Al Dhahrani
- Lulwa Al Awadhi
- Mohammed Khalid
- Muhammad ibn Mubarak ibn Hamad Al Khalifah
- Nada Haffadh
- Khalifah ibn Sulman Al Khalifah

=== Branches of government ===
Government of Bahrain

==== Executive branch of the government of Bahrain ====
- Head of state: King of Bahrain, Hamad bin Isa Al Khalifa
- Head of government: Prime Minister of Bahrain, Salman bin Hamad Al Khalifa (Crown Prince)
- Cabinet of Bahrain

==== Legislative branch of the government of Bahrain ====
- Parliament of Bahrain (bicameral)
  - Upper house: Consultative Council of Bahrain
  - Lower house: Council of Representatives of Bahrain

==== Judicial branch of the government of Bahrain ====
Court system of Bahrain

- Supreme Court of Bahrain

=== Foreign relations of Bahrain ===
- Foreign relations of Bahrain
  - Diplomatic missions in Bahrain
    - List of Ambassadors from the United Kingdom to Bahrain
    - United States Ambassador to Bahrain
  - Diplomatic missions of Bahrain
  - Forum for the Future (Bahrain 2005)
  - Major non-NATO ally

==== Bahraini diplomats ====
- Haya Rashed Al-Khalifa

==== International organization membership ====
The Kingdom of Bahrain is a member of:

- Arab Bank for Economic Development in Africa (ABEDA)
- Arab Fund for Economic and Social Development (AFESD)
- Arab Monetary Fund (AMF)
- Cooperation Council for the Arab States of the Gulf (GCC)
- Food and Agriculture Organization (FAO)
- Group of 77 (G77)
- International Bank for Reconstruction and Development (IBRD)
- International Chamber of Commerce (ICC)
- International Civil Aviation Organization (ICAO)
- International Criminal Court (ICCt) (signatory)
- International Criminal Police Organization (Interpol)
- International Development Association (IDA)
- International Federation of Red Cross and Red Crescent Societies (IFRCS)
- International Finance Corporation (IFC)
- International Hydrographic Organization (IHO)
- International Labour Organization (ILO)
- International Maritime Organization (IMO)
- International Mobile Satellite Organization (IMSO)
- International Monetary Fund (IMF)
- International Olympic Committee (IOC)
- International Organization for Migration (IOM) (observer)
- International Organization for Standardization (ISO)
- International Red Cross and Red Crescent Movement (ICRM)
- International Telecommunication Union (ITU)
- International Telecommunications Satellite Organization (ITSO)
- International Trade Union Confederation (ITUC)
- Inter-Parliamentary Union (IPU)
- Islamic Development Bank (IDB)
- League of Arab States (LAS)
- Multilateral Investment Guarantee Agency (MIGA)
- Nonaligned Movement (NAM)
- Organisation for the Prohibition of Chemical Weapons (OPCW)
- Organization of Arab Petroleum Exporting Countries (OAPEC)
- Organisation of Islamic Cooperation (OIC)
- Permanent Court of Arbitration (PCA)
- United Nations (UN)
- United Nations Conference on Trade and Development (UNCTAD)
- United Nations Educational, Scientific, and Cultural Organization (UNESCO)
- United Nations Industrial Development Organization (UNIDO)
- Universal Postal Union (UPU)
- World Customs Organization (WCO)
- World Federation of Trade Unions (WFTU)
- World Health Organization (WHO)
- World Intellectual Property Organization (WIPO)
- World Meteorological Organization (WMO)
- World Tourism Organization (UNWTO)
- World Trade Organization (WTO)

=== Law and order in Bahrain ===
Law of Bahrain

- Constitution of Bahrain
- Crime in Bahrain
  - Human Trafficking in Bahrain
  - Slavery in Bahrain
- Human rights in Bahrain
  - LGBTQ rights in Bahrain
  - Women's rights in Bahrain
  - Freedom of religion in Bahrain
  - Workers Trade Union Law
  - State Security Law in Bahrain
- Al Muntada
- Faisal Fulad
- Human rights organizations in Bahrain
  - Bahrain Centre for Human Rights
  - Bahrain Human Rights Society
  - Bahrain Human Rights Watch Society
- Lulwa Al Awadhi
- Supreme Council for Women
- We Have A Right
- Women's political rights in Bahrain

==== Torture in Bahrain ====
- Torture in Bahrain
- Adel Flaifel
- Ian Henderson (Britain)
- Royal Decree 56 of 2002

Law enforcement in Bahrain

- Prisons in Bahrain
- Public Security Forces
  - Special Security Force Command

=== Military of Bahrain ===
- Command
  - Commander-in-chief: King Hamad ibn Isa Al Khalifa
    - Ministry of Defence of Bahrain
- Forces
  - Army of Bahrain
  - Navy of Bahrain
  - Air Force of Bahrain
  - Royal Guard
  - Royal Medical Services
- Military history of Bahrain
- Military ranks of Bahrain

=== Local government in Bahrain ===
Local government in Bahrain

== History of Bahrain ==
- History of Bahrain (1783–1971)
- 1981 failed coup d'état in Bahrain
- 1990s Uprising in Bahrain
- Arad Fort
- Awal
- Bab Al Bahrain
- Baharna
- Bahrain Independence Day
- Barbar temple
- Charles Belgrave
- Dilmun
- First Oil Well, Bahrain
- Former municipalities of Bahrain
- Forum for the Future (Bahrain 2005)
- Hamad ibn Isa Al Khalifa (1872-1942)
- Isa ibn Ali Al Khalifa
- Al Muharraq
- National Action Charter of Bahrain
- National Liberation Front - Bahrain
- Qal'at al-Bahrain
- Qarmatians
- Riffa Fort
- Salman ibn Hamad Al Khalifa (1895-1961)

=== Archaeological sites in Bahrain ===
- Archaeological sites in Bahrain
  - Barbar temple
  - Dilmun Burial Mounds
  - Qal'at al-Bahrain
  - Riffa Fort

=== Disasters in Bahrain ===
- 2006 Bahrain ferry disaster

== Culture of Bahrain ==
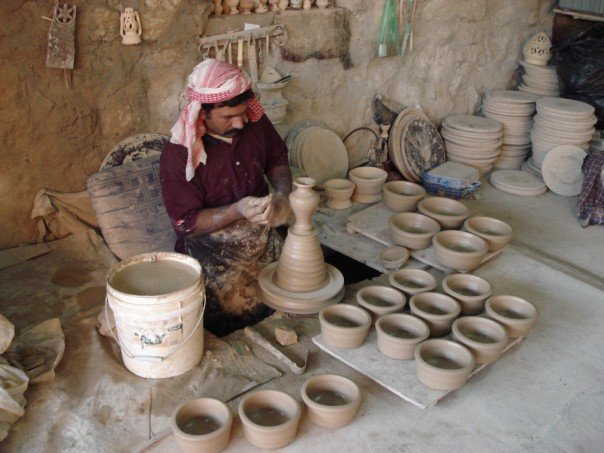
An artisan making pottery using the traditional mud and water mixture on a revolving wheel.

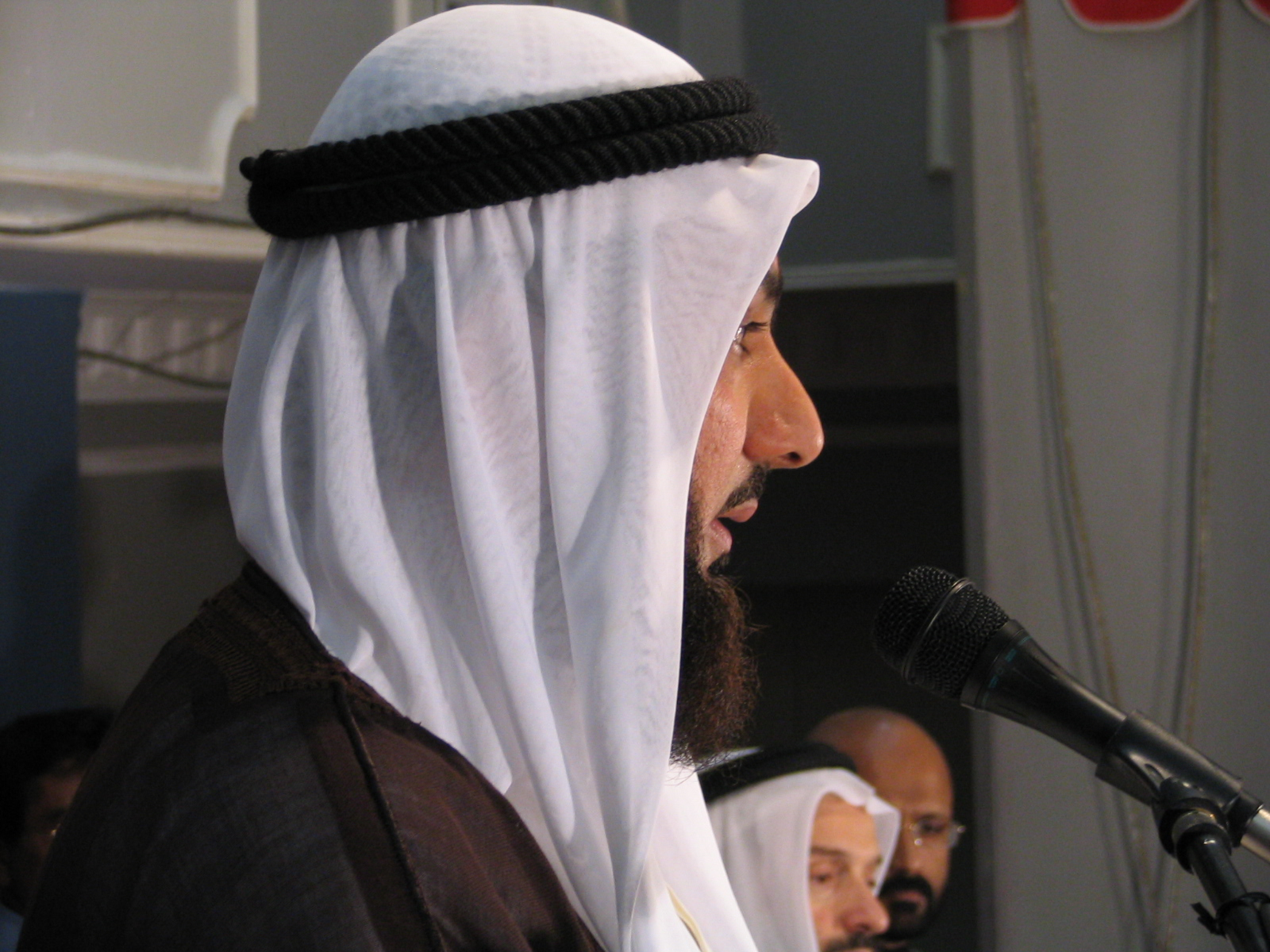
Bahraini man wearing the ghutra and agal

- Architecture of Bahrain
  - Forts in Bahrain
    - Arad Fort
    - Qal'at al-Bahrain
    - Riffa Fort
  - Tallest structures in Bahrain
- Art in Bahrain
  - Cinema of Bahrain
  - Literature of Bahrain
    - Bahraini poetry
    - Bahraini poets
      - Ali Al Shargawi
      - Ebrahim Al-Arrayedh
      - Ali Al Jallawi
      - Tarafa
      - Mohammed Hasan Kamaluddin
  - Music of Bahrain
    - Ali Bahar
    - Fijiri
    - Sawt
  - National Theatre of Bahrain
- Cuisine of Bahrain
- Festivals in Bahrain
- Holidays in Bahrain
  - Bahrain Independence Day
- Languages of Bahrain
  - Bahrani Arabic
  - Gulf Arabic
- Media of Bahrain
  - Censorship in Bahrain
  - Newspapers in Bahrain
  - Bahrain Radio and Television Corporation
  - Radio in Bahrain
  - Television in Bahrain
- Museums in Bahrain
  - Bahrain National Museum
  - Beit Al Qur'an
- National symbols of Bahrain
  - Coat of arms of Bahrain
  - Flag of Bahrain
  - National anthem of Bahrain
- People of Bahrain
  - Bahrani people
  - Ethnic, cultural and religious groups of Bahrain
- Prostitution in Bahrain
- Public holidays in Bahrain
- Religion in Bahrain
  - Buddhism in Bahrain
  - Christianity in Bahrain
    - Roman Catholicism in Bahrain
  - Hinduism in Bahrain
  - Islam in Bahrain
    - Mosques in Bahrain
  - Judaism in Bahrain
- Scouting in Bahrain
  - Boy Scouts of Bahrain
  - The Girl Guides Association of Bahrain

=== Bahraini people ===
- List of Bahrainis

==== Bahraini families ====
===== Al Khalifa =====
- Haya Rashed Al-Khalifa
- Hamad ibn Isa Al Khalifa (1872-1942)
- Hamad ibn Isa Al Khalifah
- Isa ibn Ali Al Khalifa
- Isa ibn Salman Al Khalifah
- Khalid ibn Ahmad Al Khalifah
- Faisal ibn Hamad Al Khalifah
- Khalifah ibn Sulman Al Khalifah
- Meriam Al-Khalifa
- Muhammad ibn Mubarak ibn Hamad Al Khalifah
- Salman bin Hamad bin Isa Al Khalifa
- Salman ibn Hamad Al Khalifa (1895-1961)

===== Bahraini activists =====
- Faisal Fulad
- Adel Flaifel

===== Bahraini actors =====
- Zainab Al Askari

===== Bahraini journalists =====
- Mansoor al-Jamri

===== Bahraini lawyers =====
- Haya Rashed Al-Khalifa

===== Bahraini musicians =====
- Mohammed Haddad

====== Bahraini singers ======
Bahraini female singers

- Hala Al Turk
- Hind (singer)

Bahraini male singers

- Ali Bahar
- Rashed Al-Majed
- Salem Allan
- Khaled El Sheikh
- Ala Ghawas

===== Bahraini pirates =====
- Rahmah bin Jabir al-Jalahimah

===== Bahraini prisoners and detainees =====
- Juma Mohammed Abdul Latif Al Dossary
- Salman Ebrahim Mohamed Ali Al Khalifa
- Essa Al Murbati
- Abdulla Majid Al Naimi

=== Sport in Bahrain ===
==== Bahraini Clubs ====
- Al-Ahli
- Al-Najma
- Bahrain Club
- Busaiteen Club
- Manama Club
- Muharraq Club
- Riffa
- Sitra Club

==== Cricket in Bahrain ====
- Bahraini cricket team

==== Football in Bahrain ====
- Bahrain Football Association
- Bahrain national football team
- Bahraini Premier League

==== Bahrain Grand Prix ====
- Bahrain Grand Prix
  - 2004 Bahrain Grand Prix
  - 2005 Bahrain Grand Prix
  - 2006 Bahrain Grand Prix
  - 2007 Bahrain Grand Prix
  - 2008 Bahrain Grand Prix
  - 2009 Bahrain Grand Prix
  - 2010 Bahrain Grand Prix
  - 2011 Bahrain Grand Prix
  - 2012 Bahrain Grand Prix
- Bahrain International Circuit

==== Bahrain at the Olympics ====
- Bahrain at the Olympics
  - Bahrain at the 1984 Summer Olympics
  - Bahrain at the 1988 Summer Olympics
  - Bahrain at the 1992 Summer Olympics
  - Bahrain at the 1996 Summer Olympics
  - Bahrain at the 2000 Summer Olympics
  - Bahrain at the 2004 Summer Olympics
  - Bahrain at the 2008 Summer Olympics
  - Bahrain at the 2012 Summer Olympics

==== Bahraini sportspeople ====
===== Bahraini footballers =====
- Salman Ghuloom
- A'ala Hubail
- Talal Yousef

===== Bahraini athletes =====
- Belal Mansoor Ali
- Maryam Yusuf Jamal
- Mushir Salem Jawher (until 2007)
- Yusuf Saad Kamel
- Aadam Ismaeel Khamis
- Rashid Ramzi
- Moustafa Ahmed Shebto
- Tareq Mubarak Taher

==== Sports venues in Bahrain ====
- Bahrain International Circuit
- Bahrain National Stadium

===== Football venues in Bahrain =====
- Al Ahli Stadium (Bahrain)
- Al Muharraq Stadium
- Bahrain National Stadium
- Madinat 'Isa Stadium

== Economy and infrastructure of Bahrain ==
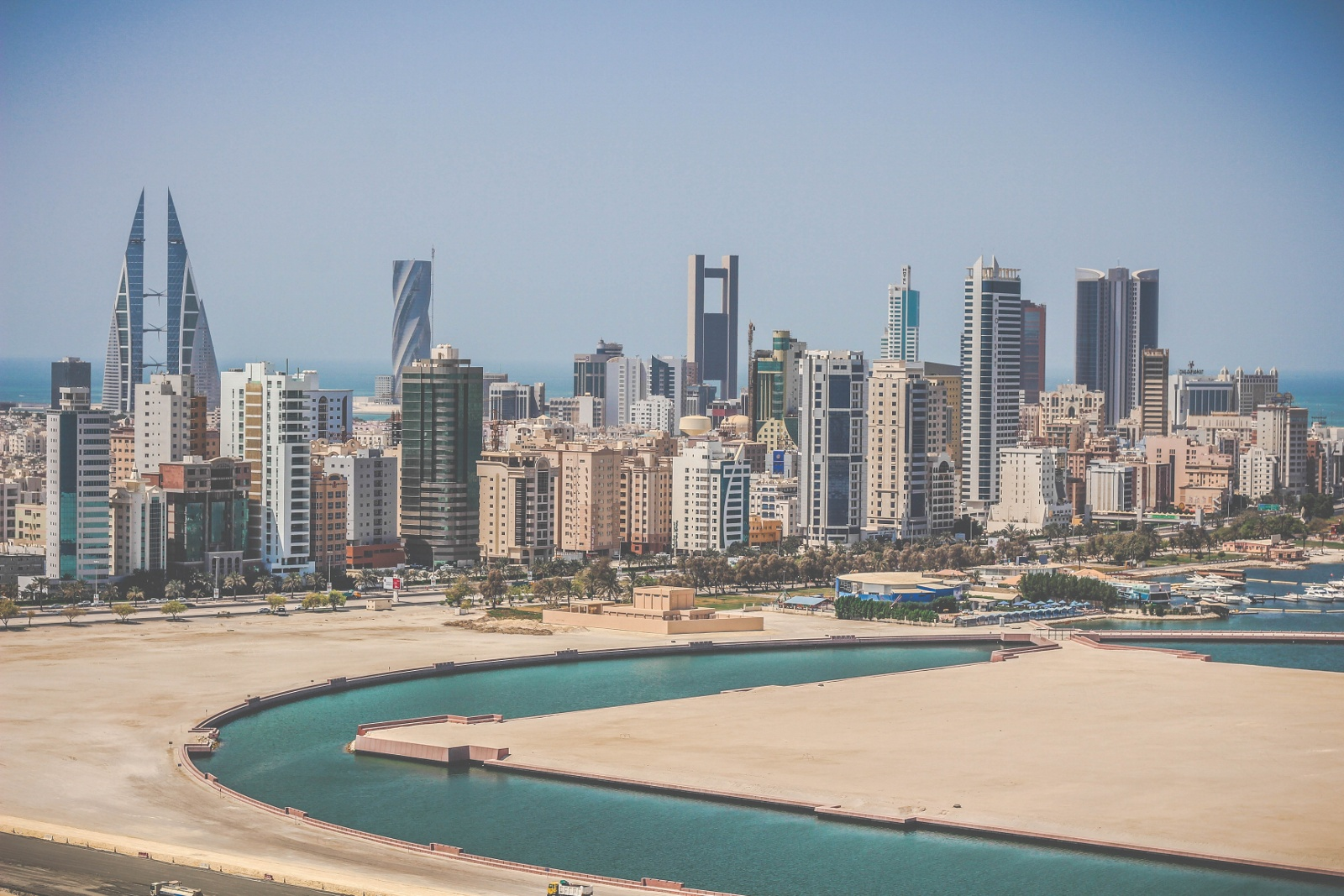
Skyline of Manama

- Economic rank, by nominal GDP (2007): 96th (ninety-sixth)
- US-Bahrain Free Trade Agreement
- Agriculture in Bahrain
- Banking in Bahrain
  - Bahraini dinar
  - Bahrain Stock Exchange
  - Banks of Bahrain
    - Bank ABC
    - Bank of Bahrain and Kuwait
    - HSBC Bank Middle East
    - Kuwait Finance House
    - National Bank of Bahrain
- Communications in Bahrain
  - Internet in Bahrain
    - .bh
  - Telephone numbers in Bahrain
  - Bahrain Radio and Television Corporation
  - Batelco
- Companies of Bahrain
  - Al Muntazah
  - ABC Islamic Bank
  - Bapco Bahrain
  - Batelco
  - Bahrain Petroleum Company
  - Gulf Traveller
  - Gulf Petrochemical Industries Company
  - Western Gulf Advisory
- Currency of Bahrain: Dinar
  - ISO 4217: BHD
- Energy in Bahrain
  - Energy in Bahrain
  - Oil industry in Bahrain
- Healthcare in Bahrain
  - List of hospitals in Bahrain
    - Salmaniya Medical Complex
    - Gulf Diabetes Specialist Center
    - American Mission Hospital
- Science and technology in Bahrain
  - Bahrain Centre for Studies and Research
- Tourism in Bahrain
  - Visitors Attraction
    - Arad Fort
    - Bab Al Bahrain
    - Bahrain Grand Prix
    - Barbar temple
    - Dilmun Burial Mounds
    - First Oil Well, Bahrain
    - Qal'at al-Bahrain
    - Riffa Fort
  - Visa policy of Bahrain
  - World Heritage Sites in Bahrain: 1
    - Qal'at al-Bahrain – was the capital of the Dilmun, one of the most important ancient civilizations of the region. It contains the richest remains inventoried of this civilization, which was hitherto only known from written Sumerian references.

=== Trade unions of Bahrain ===
- Bahrain Workers' Union
- General Federation of Workers Trade Unions in Bahrain

=== Transport in Bahrain ===
- Transport in Bahrain
  - Air transport in Bahrain
    - Airports in Bahrain
      - Bahrain International Airport
    - Airlines of Bahrain
      - DHL International
      - Gulf Air
      - Gulf Traveller
  - Rail transport in Bahrain
    - Bahrain light rail network
  - Road system in Bahrain
    - Roads in Bahrain
    - Bridges in Bahrain
      - King Fahd Causeway
      - Qatar–Bahrain Causeway

== Education in Bahrain ==
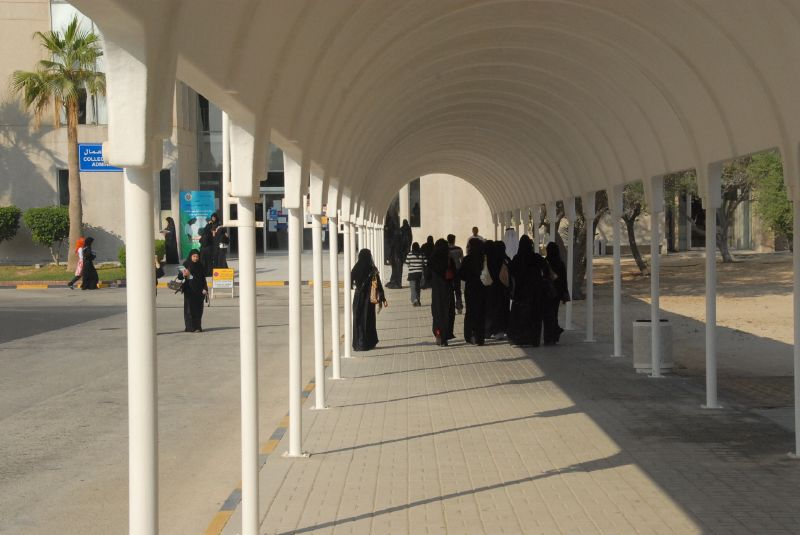
Female students at the University of Bahrain dressed in traditional garb

List of School in Bahrain

- Abdul Rahman Kanoo International School
- Bahrain Bayan School
- British School of Bahrain
- Ibn Al Hytham Islamic School
- Sacred Heart School
- St Christopher's School

List of universities in Bahrain

- Arabian Gulf University
- Bahrain Polytechnic
- College of Health and Sport Sciences
- University of Bahrain
- Arab Open University
- Royal University for Women
- University of Technology Bahrain
- University College of Bahrain

== See also ==
Bahrain

- Index of Bahrain-related articles
- List of international rankings
- Outline of Asia
