= Scouting and Guiding in Bahrain =

Scouting and Guiding Organizations in Bahrain

The Scout and Guide movement in Bahrain is served by

- The Girl Guides Association of Bahrain, member of the World Association of Girl Guides and Girl Scouts
- Boy Scouts of Bahrain, member of the World Organization of the Scout Movement

== Boy Scouts of America Scouting units in Bahrain ==
There are American Boy Scouts in Manama, linked to the Direct Service branch of the Boy Scouts of America, which supports units around the world. The troop's membership generally is drawn from Americans and occasionally foreign nationals attending Bahrain School.

The Bahrain School also sponsors a Cub Pack for younger boys. In addition to the Bahrain School Cub Scout Pack, there is another BSA Cub Scout unit (Pack 820) that meets on the western side of the island that is unaffiliated with any school. The majority of the membership is American, British, and Filipino. Membership in Pack 820 is open to all nationalities and religions, however the boy must have a working proficiency in English and be a non-Bahraini. Bahraini boys are required to join the local Bahrain Scouts. This information is current as of May 2016. As of 2017, the main BSA troop is Troop 826, part of the BSA Tranzatlantic Council. Troop 826 accepts people of all cultures.

== British Scouting Overseas - Bahrain Scout Groups ==
British Scouting has had a long history of Scouting in the Middle East. In Bahrain, British Scouting organisations have operated from at least the early 1950s with multiple Groups operating previously at different locations.

British Scouting Overseas exists to support families around the world where, due to cultural or language barriers (and the fact that people from the UK living overseas may frequently move around), it is not always possible for young people from the UK to join local Scout Groups in the country where they reside. Importantly, existing members of the UK Scout Association who wish to continue their involvement with the Movement while living here in Bahrain can do so if they wish.

The 1st Bahrain Scout Group, which is to be attached to St Christopher's School, can be attended by scouts of all nationalities.

The 1st Bahrain scout group has availability for children up to the age of 18 and is categorized into squirrels, beavers, cubs, scouts and explorers
