= GGAB =

GGAB may refer to:

- GGAB, The Girl Guides Association of Barbados
- GGAB, The Girl Guides Association of Bahrain
- Governor-General of Antigua and Barbuda
