= Ahmed Mohammed Al Amer =

Bahraini politician

- أحمد محمد العامر

Member of the Council of Representatives
- Incumbent
- Assumed office 2018
- Monarch: Hamad bin Isa Al Khalifa
- Prime Minister: Khalifa bin Salman Al Khalifa, Salman, Crown Prince of Bahrain
- Preceded by: Khalid Al-Shaer
- Parliamentary group: independent
- Constituency: 1st Constituency of the Southern Governorate

Personal details
- Born: Ahmed Mohammed Ahmed Saad Al Amer; 1977 (age 48–49)
- Occupation: banker

Ahmed Mohammed Ahmed Saad Al Amer (Arabic: أحمد محمد أحمد سعد العامر, born 1977 (age 48–49)) is a Bahraini politician, banker, and trade unionist. He was sworn into the Council of Representatives on December 12, 2018, representing the First District in the Southern Governorate.

== Biography ==
Al Amer earned a master's degree in management with a major in marketing. He worked as a senior manager at Ithmaar Bank and has been on the board of the Bahrain Bankers Syndicate. Additionally, he belongs to the General Federation of Workers Trade Unions in Bahrain.

In the 2014 Bahraini general election, he ran for the First District in the Southern Governorate. With 984 votes for 18.15% in the first round, he did not make the runoff.

In the 2018 Bahraini general election, he ran again for the same constituency, this time winning 1,602 votes for 28.46% in the first round on November 24, necessitating a second round on December 2. In this round, Al Amer defeated his opponent Nasreen Maarouf by winning 2,871 votes for 56.92%.
