= 2000s in Bahrain =

In the 2000s in Bahrain the government instituted political reforms and relaxed economic controls.

== Accession of Hamad ibn Isa Al Khalifa ==
In 1999 Shaikh Hamad ibn Isa Al Khalifa became Emir after the death of his father, Shaikh Isa bin Salman Al Khalifa, and carried out wide-ranging social and political reforms, described by Amnesty International as representing a "historic period for human rights". King Hamad ended the political repression that had defined the 1990s by scrapping security laws, releasing all political prisoners, instituting elections, giving women the vote and promising a return to constitutional rule. The move brought an end to political violence that was part of the 1990s uprising in Bahrain, but did not initially bring about a reconciliation between the government and most of the opposition groups.

The invitation to Bahrain's former exiles to return home revitalised the Kingdom's politics. Exiled leaders included a number of London-based Islamists including Dr Majid Al Alawi who became Minister of Labour, Dr Mansur Al Jamri who became editor of the new opposition daily, Al Wasat, and Sheikh Ali Salman who became head of the newly established Shia Islamist Al Wefaq, Bahrain's largest political group. Former Leftist dissidents formed the National Democratic Action, the Communist Democratic Bloc, and the Bahrain Human Rights Society. Leftists were also involved in the new trade union movement, although they faced competition from Islamists for control of several unions.

Following the political liberalization Bahrain negotiated a Free Trade Agreement with the United States in 2004. The country participated in military action against the Taliban in 2001 with its ships patrolling the Arabian Sea searching for vessels, but opposed the invasion of Iraq. Relations improved with neighbouring Qatar after the border dispute over the Hawar Islands was resolved by the International Court of Justice in The Hague in 2001. The two countries sought to build the Qatar-Bahrain Friendship Bridge to link the countries across the Persian Gulf, which would have had been the longest fixed link bridge in the world when completed, however with the 2017–19 Qatar diplomatic crisis imposed by Bahrain, Saudi Arabia, United Arab Emirates, and Egypt, the plan was dismissed.

== 2001: National Action Charter ==
In 2001 Hamad put forward the National Action Charter which would return the country to constitutional rule. However the opposition was opposed to the Charter's call for an amendment to the 1973 Constitution, changing the legislature from unicameral to bicameral. The Charter stated that "the legislature will consist of two chambers, namely one that is constituted through free, direct elections whose mandate will be to enact laws, and a second one that would have people with experience and expertise who would give advice as necessary." The opposition groups deemed this statement to be too ambiguous, and remained opposed to the Charter.

Hamad responded by holding a highly publicized meeting with the spiritual leaders of the Shia Islamist opposition. He signed a document clarifying that only the elected lower house of the parliament would have legislative power, while the appointed upper house would have a strictly advisory role. Upon this assurance, the main opposition groups accepted the Charter and called for a 'Yes' vote in the national referendum. The Charter was accepted in the 2001 referendum with 98.4% voting 'Yes' for it.

== 2002: new constitution ==
However, in 2002 Hamad promulgated the 2002 Constitution in which both the elected and the royally-appointed chambers of parliament were given equal legislative powers, going back on his public promise of 2001. As a result, the parliamentary elections due to be held later that year were boycotted by a group of four political societies; Al Wefaq, a Shia Islamist group, thought to be the most popular political society in the country, National Democratic Action, the largest Leftist political society, Islamic Action Society, a marginal Shia Islamist society, and the Nationalist Democratic Rally Society, a marginal Arab Nationalist society.

Between 2002 and 2006, the four boycotting societies continued their demand for discussions on constitutional reforms. By 2006 these four party opposition indicated that it would participate in the parliamentary elections, but retain their demand for constitutional reform at the top of their agenda.

== Bahraini uprising ==
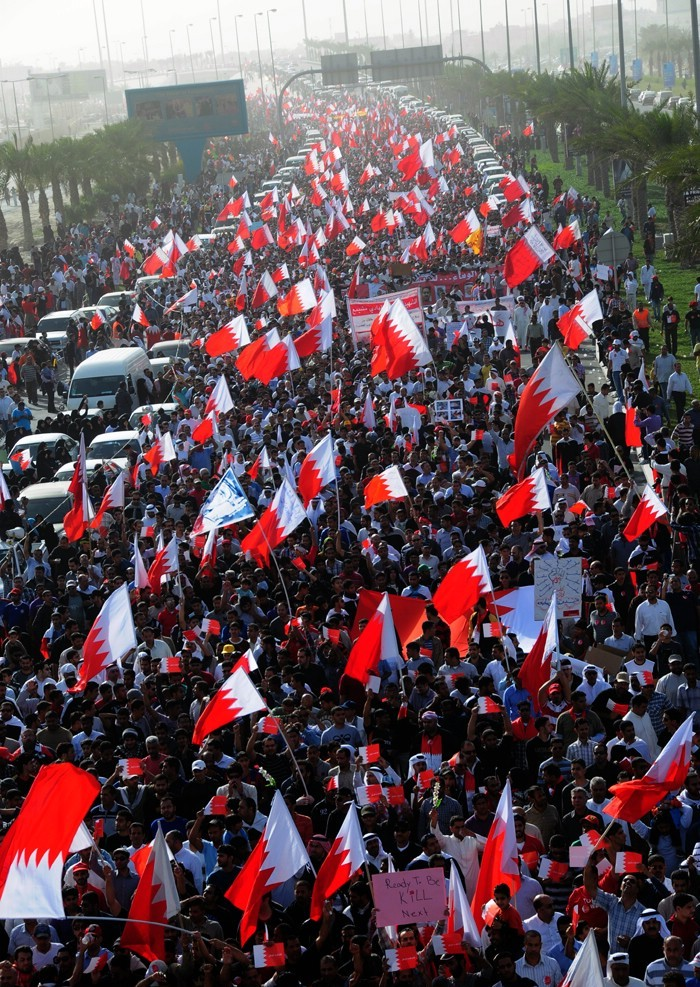
Over 100,000 of Bahrainis taking part in the "March of Loyalty to Martyrs", honoring political dissidents killed by security forces, on 22 February.

The protests in Bahrain started on 14 February, and were initially aimed at achieving greater political freedom and respect for human rights; they were not intended to directly threaten the monarchy. Lingering frustration among the Shiite majority with being ruled by the Sunni government was a major root cause, but the protests in Tunisia and Egypt are cited as the inspiration for the demonstrations. The protests were largely peaceful until a pre-dawn raid by police on 17 February to clear protestors from Pearl Roundabout in Manama, in which police killed four protesters. Following the raid, some protesters began to expand their aims to a call for the end of the monarchy. On 18 February army forces opened fire on protesters when they tried to reenter the roundabout, fatally wounding one. The following day protesters reoccupied Pearl Roundabout after the government ordered troops and police to withdraw. Subsequent days saw large demonstrations; on 21 February a pro-government Gathering of National Unity drew tens of thousands, whilst on 22 February the number of protestors at the Pearl Roundabout peaked at over 150,000 after more than 100,000 protesters marched there. On 14 March, Saudi-led GCC forces were requested by the government and entered the country, which the opposition called an "occupation".

King Hamad bin Isa Al Khalifa declared a three-month state of emergency on 15 March and asked the military to reassert its control as clashes spread across the country. On 16 March, armed soldiers and riot police cleared the protesters' camp in the Pearl Roundabout, in which 3 policemen and 3 protesters were reportedly killed. Later, on 18 March, the government tore down Pearl Roundabout monument. After the lifting of emergency law on 1 June, several large rallies were staged by the opposition parties. Smaller-scale protests and clashes outside of the capital have continued to occur almost daily. On 9 March 2012 over 100,000 protested in what the opposition called "the biggest march in our history".

The police response has been described as a "brutal" crackdown on peaceful and unarmed protestors, including doctors and bloggers. The police carried out midnight house raids in Shia neighbourhoods, beatings at checkpoints, and denial of medical care in a "campaign of intimidation". More than 2,929 people have been arrested, and at least five people died due to torture while in police custody. On 23 November 2011 the Bahrain Independent Commission of Inquiry released its report on its investigation of the events, finding that the government had systematically tortured prisoners and committed other human rights violations. It also rejected the government's claims that the protests were instigated by Iran. Although the report found that systematic torture had stopped, the Bahraini government has refused entry to several international human rights groups and news organizations, and delayed a visit by a UN inspector. More than 80 people had died since the start of the uprising.
