= Lulwa Al Awadhi =

Bahraini women's rights advocate

Lulwa Al Awadhi is a leading Bahraini women's rights advocate and the Secretary General of the Supreme Council for Women, the main women's organisation in Bahrain. She holds the rank of 'honorary cabinet minister', which she was given in 2002 when the Council was established as part of the opening of civil society in the small Gulf Kingdom. She has been at the forefront of the Council's campaign to get parliament to introduce a Personal Status Law to protect women's rights in issues of divorce and inheritance. This has led her to clash with Islamists who have promised 'blood on the streets' if women are given such rights. She has been one of the few political leaders in Bahrain to challenge Islamists directly, saying that they are not respecting women's rights and instead of engaging in debating are personalising confrontations. However, she has been careful to keep debate on the proposed law within religious terms, telling the Gulf News: "I was the first Bahraini woman and lawyer to realise that in the seventies there was a difference between religious rulings and what is being implemented."

She has been key in drawing up the Supreme Council's strategy to assist female candidates contest 2006's election. Since 2002 women have had the right to vote and contest parliamentary and local elections, and Al Awardhi has urged women to fully utilise their rights: "Women must be able to identify all relevant provisions in the Constitution and the means to exercise their political rights."

Al Awadhi's background is in Law, and along with Haya Rashed Al Khalifa (who subsequently went on to become the President of the United Nations General Assembly) she became one of the first two practising female lawyers in the 1970s.

== See also ==
- List of first women lawyers and judges in Asia

== See also ==
- Women's Political Rights in Bahrain
- Politics of Bahrain
