= Sawsan al-Sha'er =

Bahraini journalist

- سوسن الشاعر
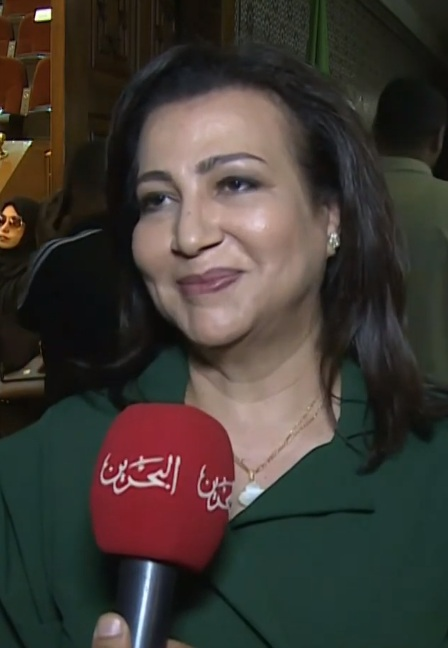
- Sawsan al-Sha'ir talks to Bahrain TV, 9 May 2018
- Born: July 15, 1956 (age 69)
- Education: Bachelor of Arts
- Alma mater: Beirut Arab University Department of History
- Occupations: journalist, TV presenter
- Organization: Al Muntada
- Known for: column and TV show كلمة أخيرة ("One Last Word")
- Spouse: Ismail Akbari
- Children: Bassam Al-Benhamed

Sawsan al-Sha'er (Arabic: سوسن الشاعر; born July 12, 1956) is a journalist and author. She is a columnist with Al-Watan newspaper, having joined the staff there from the pro-government Al-Ayam.

al-Sha'er is known for her liberal opinions and has been a critic of religious "extremism". al-Sha'er has debated religious clerics and criticized their opinions. This has brought her into confrontation with Bahrain's Islamist politicians, such as Ali Salman and Adel Mouwda. She has accused those who back suicide bombers in Iraq of trying to "lead Bahrain to hell".

While a supporter of King Hamad's political liberalization, al-Sha'er has criticised the government for failing to meet its reform commitments and for the performance of individual ministers. On 26 February 2006, in Al-Watan, she criticized the Minister of Housing, Fahmi al-Jowder, for what she deemed his "ludicrous praise reminiscent of the Saddam Hussain coterie."

== Education ==
She holds a Bachelor of Arts in Literature from Beirut Arab University's Department of History.

== Career ==
From 1989 to 2005, she worked for Al-Ayam, but since 2005 she has worked for Al-Watan. Her column there is كلمة أخيرة (“One Last Word”). She has also worked for several other Gulf, including Al-Watan (Kuwait), Al Yaum in Saudi Arabia, and Al-Watan (Qatar).

In 2005, she began hosting a TV show based on the column, likewise entitled “One Last Word.”

She volunteers for several local organizations, including the Bahraini Society for Child Development, the Mercy Center for the Care of People with Severe Mental Retardation, the Consumer Protection Association, the Bahrain Journalists’ Association, and the Bahrain Society Forum.

The Bahraini government ordered a Bahraini Al-Watan article she wrote to be withdrawn over allegations she made that the Iranian Shia lobby controlled the state of Kuwait.

In 2015, a dispute with the Minister of Information of Bahrain led “One Last Word” to be suspended, but this was overridden by King Hamad bin Isa Al Khalifa ordering immediate resumption of its broadcast.

== Awards ==
- Bahrain National Merit Award, 1993
- Creative Pioneer Award from Al-Muharraq SC, 1996
- Best Social Television Program Award, 1996
- Best Talk Show Award from the 2007 Cairo International Film Festival
- National Service Award, First Class, 2009
- Best Journalist Award at Creativity Awards of the Arab Media Forum, 2009

== Publications ==
- البحرين قصة الصراع السياسي 1904 – 1956 (“Bahrain: History of Political Conflict 1904—1956”), co-written with Muhammad Abdulqadir al-Jassim (2000)
- كلمة اخيرة (“One Last Word”), collected articles (2007)
