= Al Muntada =

Al Muntada (or The Forum) is a Bahrain society set up by academics, journalists and businessmen to promote liberalism in the Kingdom.

It was established in 2001 to provide a place for liberals to debate how they could meet the challenge of religious extremist domination of political life, which has been a consequence of Bahrain's democratization process; Shia and Sunni extremists have been the best organized and most popular political parties and have quickly filled the new political space opened by reforms.

Al Muntada has since met monthly to debate the most recent political issues. It is chaired by Adel Fakhro, the vice chairman is Gulf News columnist and South Asian specialist, Dr Abdullah Al Madani, and other leading members include journalist Sawsan Al Sha’er and Dr Ahmad Juma, the head of Al Meethaq.

The major challenge facing Bahraini liberals is their small number, while Islamist parties such as Asalah and Al Wefaq are mass organisations. Al Muntada does not pretend to have the same scale of support, but has sought to hold meetings to address issues of interest to a growing portion of the population. Because of the number of liberals, the group has not sought to become another political party but tries to use the new political space in civil society to influence opinion and policy.

In an Arab region where deference to religious figures is the norm, Al Muntada is unapologetically secular, giving voice to liberals’ aspirations and concerns. Its spokesmen have condemned the "dark forces" inside the parliament that want to "promote the same ideology of the Taliban".

Traditionally Bahrain's liberals had looked to the government to be their protector, and in some ways the government has signaled its intention to safeguard personal freedoms in the new political framework by appointing sixteen members of the liberal Al Meethaq party to the Consultative Council, Bahrain's appointed upper chamber of parliament, to counter the dominance of Islamists in the lower chamber. However, liberals have expressed the strongest concern after the government has signaled that it would avoid confrontation with Islamist MPs over issues such as the sale of alcohol during Ramadan, and other personal freedoms.

Among the initiatives launched by Al Muntada is a campaign to protect personal freedoms, We Have A Right, with affiliate organisations, Bahrain Youth Society, National Liberal Thought Society, Bahrain Women's Society, National Action Charity Society, the Future Forum Society and the Alumni Club, spearheading the task force. The group has criticised legislative proposals put forward by Ali Mattar MP for the introduction of Sharia Law. Dr Abdullah Al Madani told the Gulf Daily News "Could you have ever imagined in your lives that someone in Bahrain could ever propose a law to cut off hands?"

Within the elected Chamber of Deputies Al Muntada is known to be close to the Economists Bloc and to a lesser extent, the Democratic Bloc.

Islamists have responded to the challenge posed by Al Muntada by ignoring it initially and then seeking to portray it as pro-government, pro-American and elitist.
