= Politics of Bahrain =

Politics of Bahrain takes place in an authoritarian system of government where the ruling House of Khalifa heads an absolute monarchy. The government is appointed by the King of Bahrain, King Hamad bin Isa Al Khalifa. The head of the government since 2020 is Crown Prince Salman bin Hamad Al Khalifa, who became Prime Minister following the death of Khalifa bin Salman Al Khalifa, and who also serves as Deputy Commander of the Bahrain Defence Force.

After the Arab Spring, the monarchy substantially cracked down on political freedoms and civil liberties in Bahrain.

== Political background ==
=== Isa bin Salman Al Khalifa ===
Bahrain gained independence from the United Kingdom in 1971, with Sheikh Isa bin Salman Al Khalifa as its ruler. In 1972, Isa issued a decree for the election of a Constituent Assembly to draft and ratify a constitution. The electorate of the constituent assembly was native-born male citizens aged twenty years or older. The Constituent Assembly consisted of 22 elected delegates, plus the 12 members of the Council of Ministers and 8 members directly appointed by the Emir. All elected candidates ran as independents.

The draft constitution enshrined the hereditary leadership on the Al Khalifa family and provided for a unicameral legislature (the National Assembly) consisting of 44 members, 30 elected by native-born male citizens, plus 14 royally-appointed government ministers who were ex officio members. The constitution was enacted by decree in December 1973.

A general election was also held in December 1973, the only election held under the 1973 Constitution. Two distinct political blocs formed amongst the 30 elected members. The "People's Bloc" consisted of eight Shia and Sunni members elected from urban areas and associated with left-wing and nationalist organizations, including the Popular Front for the Liberation of Bahrain, the National Liberation Front – Bahrain or the Baathist movement. The "Religious Bloc" was made up of six Shia members mostly from rural constituencies. The remaining members were independents with shifting positions. The National Assembly found itself without legislative powers, but closer to a public forum where petitions were heard and government legislation and policies were presented, debated and criticized, though elected members of the assembly sought to gain legislative powers. The government did not acquiesce and the Emir continued to issue laws by decree and in 1974 a proposed security law sparked a political crisis between certain members of the Assembly and the government. The security laws would have granted state authorities extraordinary powers to arrest and detain suspects deemed to threaten national security. A bloc formed within the National Assembly opposed to the security laws and the manner in which the government imposed the law. The crisis came to a head in August 1975 when Isa dissolved the National Assembly, and the country continued to be governed under emergency laws until 2002.

Following the 1979 Islamic revolution in Iran in 1981, the Bahraini Shia population orchestrated a failed coup attempt under the auspices of a front organisation, the Islamic Front for the Liberation of Bahrain. The coup would have installed a Shia cleric exiled in Iran, Hujjatu l-Islām Hādī al-Mudarrisī, as supreme leader heading a theocratic government. In December 1994, a group of youths threw stones at female runners for running bare-legged during an international marathon. The resulting clash with police soon grew into civil unrest.

A popular uprising occurred between 1994 and 2000 in which leftists, liberals and Islamists joined forces. The event resulted in approximately forty deaths.

=== Hamad bin Isa Al Khalifa ===
The repression ended after Hamad bin Isa Al Khalifa became the Emir of Bahrain in 1999. He instituted elections for parliament, gave women the right to vote, and released all political prisoners. A referendum on 14–15 February 2001 massively supported the National Action Charter, which was adopted on 14 February 2002.

An elected representative body was not reintroduced until the rule of Sheikh Isa's son, Sheikh Hamad bin Isa Al Khalifa, who succeeded as head of state in 1999, and initiated wide-ranging political reforms scrapping the restrictive state security laws, giving women the right to vote, freeing all political prisoners and holding parliamentary elections. The first poll was the 2002 Bahraini general election, with MPs serving four‑year terms; the second parliamentary election was the 2006 Bahraini general election.

The Kingdom of Bahrain has been ruled by HM King Hamad bin Isa since 1999. The Al Khalifa family has ruled Bahrain since the late 1700s. The current ruler Hamad bin Isa became the Emir of Bahrain in 1999. In 2002, he declared Bahrain a kingdom and installed the king.

The reforms were based on the National Action Charter, a package of political changes that was endorsed by the people of Bahrain on 14 February 2001, in a popular referendum that saw a 98.4% vote in favour. Among other issues, the referendum paved the way for national elections and for the country to become a constitutional monarchy, changing the country's official name from the State of Bahrain to the Kingdom of Bahrain (a change which took effect in February 2002). Parliamentary elections took place on 26 October 2002 with the new legislature, the National Assembly, beginning work the following month.

The opposition led by Islamic parties boycotted the 2002 election in protest at the bicameral nature of the parliament, because the appointed upper chamber, the Shura Council, has the power to veto legislation. Shura members have responded by pointing out that an appointed upper chamber is a feature of long-established democracies such as the United Kingdom (where the upper chamber has the power to delay, but no power to veto legislation) and Canada.

However, the principle behind the Al Wefaq's boycott, that only elected MPs should have the right to legislate, was undermined when, in response to proposed changes to the family law to give women more rights, Al Wefaq stated that no one except religious leaders had the authority to amend the law because MPs could 'misinterpret the word of God.'

Democratisation has greatly enhanced clerical influence, through the ability of religious leaders to deliver the votes of their congregations to candidates. Sheikh Abdullah Al Ghraifi, the deputy head of the Islamic Scholars Council, gave a clear warning of the clerics' intent: "We have at our disposition 150,000 votes that we will forward to the MPs, and I hope that they understand this message clearly." Over the showdown with the government and women's rights activists on the introduction of stronger legal rights for women, clerics have taken a lead in mobilising the opposition and threatened to instruct their supporters to vote against MPs that support women's rights.

The opening up of politics has seen big gains for both Shī´a and Sunnī Islamic parties in elections, which has given them a parliamentary platform to pursue their policies. This has meant that what is termed "morality issues" have moved further up the political agenda with parties launching campaigns to impose bans on female mannequins displaying lingerie in shop windows, sorcery and the hanging of underwear on washing lines. Analysts of democratisation in the Middle East cite the Islamic parties' references to respect for human rights in their justification for these programmes as evidence that these groups can serve as a progressive force in the region.

The near-total dominance of religious parties in elections has given new prominence to clerics within the political system, with the most senior Shia religious leader, Sheikh Isa Qassim, playing an extremely important role. According to one academic paper, "In fact, it seems that few decisions can be arrived at in Al Wefaq – and in the whole country, for that matter – without prior consultation with Isa Qassim, ranging from questions with regard to the planned codification of the personal status law to participate in elections". In 2007, Al Wefaq-backed parliamentary investigations were credited with forcing the government to remove ministers who had frequently clashed with MPs: the Minister of Health, Dr Nada Haffadh and the Minister of Information, Dr Mohammed Abdul Gaffar.

Bahraini liberals have responded to the growing power of religious parties by organising themselves to campaign through civil society to defend basic personal freedoms from being legislated away. In November 2005, al Muntada, a grouping of liberal academics, launched "We Have A Right", a campaign to explain to the public why personal freedoms matter and why they need to be defended.

Both Sunnī and Shī´a Islamic parties suffered a setback in March 2006 when twenty municipal councillors, most of whom represented religious parties, went missing in Bangkok on an unscheduled stopover when returning from a conference in Malaysia. After the missing councillors eventually arrived in Bahrain they defended their Bangkok stay, telling journalists it was a "fact-finding mission", explaining: "We benefited a lot from the trip to Thailand because we saw how they managed their transport, landscaping and roads."

Women's political rights in Bahrain saw an important step forward when women were granted the right to vote and stand in national elections for the first time in the 2002 election. However, no women were elected to office in that year's polls and instead Shī´a and Sunnī Islamic parties dominated the election, collectively winning a majority of seats. In response to the failure of women candidates, six were appointed to the Shura Council, which also includes representatives of the Kingdom's indigenous Jewish and Christian communities. The country's first female cabinet minister was appointed in 2004 when Dr. Nada Haffadh became Minister of Health, while the quasi-governmental women's group, the Supreme Council for Women, trained female candidates to take part in the 2006 general election.

The King created the Supreme Judicial Council in 2000 to regulate the country's courts and institutionalize the separation of the administrative and judicial branches of government. The King is the head of the council.

On 11–12 November 2005, Bahrain hosted the Forum for the Future bringing together leaders from the Middle East and G8 countries to discuss political and economic reform in the region.

Shia and Sunni Islamic parties have both criticised the government over the composition of the appointed Shura Council, after it was given a strongly liberal majority, with Al Meethaq being the biggest group in the chamber. Critics allege that the government is seeking to use the Shura Council as a liberal bulwark to prevent clerical domination of politics.

Dominated by Islamic and tribal MPs, liberals have criticised the lower house for trying to impose a restrictive social agenda and curtailing freedoms. Those MPs who do not have an Islamic ideological agenda have been criticised for tending to approach politics not as a way of promoting principles, but as a means of securing government jobs and investment in their constituencies. The only voices that regularly speak in favour of human rights and democratic values in the lower house are the former communists of the Democratic Bloc and the secular Economists Bloc.

Antigovernment factions state that the five municipal councils elected in 2002 do not have enough powers. Councillors of Islamic parties have repeatedly complained that their policies are being frustrated by lack of cooperation from central government. This has encouraged councillors to use at times innovative methods to push forward their policies. In January 2006, Dr Salah Al Jowler, an Asalah councillor in Muharraq discussed how the municipality would enforce a decree that would stipulate that all new buildings be fitted with one-way windows so that passersby would be unable to see residents within their homes (after concerns were raised about peeping toms). Dr Al Jowder explained that the municipalities would enforce the measure by using their control over the electricity supply: "We can't stop someone from building if they do not promise to install one-way windows. But we can make them put in one-way windows if they want permission to install electricity."

In October 2005, Al Wefaq and the former Maoist National Democratic Action agreed to register under the new Political Societies Law, but continue to object to it because it prevented parties from receiving foreign funding. The move has been widely seen as indicating that the two parties will take part in the 2006 general election, particularly as they have faced considerable pressure from party members to participate. Once the law took effect, Al Wefaq reversed its previous opposition and described it as a 'big milestone for Bahrain'.

To revitalise the Left before the September 2006 general election, leading lawyer, Abdullah Hashem launched the National Justice Movement in March 2006. While Bahrain's liberals have sought to use the opening of civil society to campaign against the domination of Islamic parties in politics, with a campaign to protect personal freedoms, We Have A Right, led by the civic group, Al Muntada.

Bahrain's five governorates are administered by the Minister of State for Municipalities and the Environment in conjunction with each Governorate's Governor. A complex system of courts, based on diverse legal sources, including Sunni and Shi'a Sharia (religious law), tribal law, and other civil codes and regulation, was created with the help of British advisers in the early twentieth century. This judiciary administers the legal code and reviews laws to ensure their constitutionality.

Major protests occurred in 2011, coincident with protests in many other countries in the Arab world. The protesters selected 14 February as a day of protest to coincide with the 10th anniversary of the National Action Charter.

== National security ==
=== External threats ===
Though juxtaposed between much larger neighbours, the tiny island Kingdom of Bahrain does not face any immediate threats from foreign nations. Likewise, it is not currently involved in any international disputes. In the recent past, however, relations between Bahrain and two other Arabian Gulf states – Iran and Qatar – were less than amicable. The government of Bahrain has made a concerted effort to improve relations with both. Relations with Iran were initially strained over Bahrain's 1981 discovery of an Iranian-sponsored plot to stage a coup. Bahrain's suspicion that Iran had also instigated domestic political unrest in the 1990s fueled the tension. Bahrain's recent efforts to improve relations with Iran include encouraging trade between the respective nations, as well as promoting maritime security cooperation. Hostile relations between Bahrain and Qatar stemmed from a longstanding territorial dispute. On March 16, 2001, an International Court of Justice (ICJ) ruling facilitated a peaceful settlement of the matter. The ICJ granted sovereignty over the Hawar Islands and Qit' at Jaradah to Bahrain and sovereignty over Zubarah (part of the Qatar Peninsula), Janan Island and Fasht ad Dibal to Qatar.

=== Insurgencies ===
The government of Bahrain does not face any immediate threats from individuals or organizations that seek to undermine its sovereignty. In the past, however, it has been forced to contend with political uprisings. The government foiled an attempted coup in 1981. The disaffection of Bahrain's Shi’a majority precipitated a series of violent incidents in the 1990s. Legislative reforms aimed at addressing the estranged population's underlying grievances initially held the violence in check. In 1996 tensions resurfaced, however, and a number of hotel and restaurant bombings resulted in numerous casualties. The government subsequently arrested over 1,000 individuals for their alleged participation in the incidents and proceeded to hold them without trial.

Shaikh Hamad bin Isa Al Khalifa assumed the throne in March 1999 upon the death of his father, Shaikh Isa bin Salman Al Khalifa, the ruler of Bahrain since 1961. He continued to implement democratic reforms, including the transformation of Bahrain from a hereditary emirate to a constitutional monarchy, and in so doing changed his status from emir to king. He also pardoned all political prisoners and detainees, including those who had been arrested for their unsubstantiated participation in the 1996 bombings as well as abolishing the State Security Law and the State Security Court, which had permitted the government to detain individuals without trial for up to 3 years.

In February 2011 a series of protests by the Shia majority began which became the Bahraini uprising.

=== Terrorism ===
The government of Bahrain has actively cooperated with the international community in general and the United States in particular to combat global terrorism. Basing and extensive overflight clearances that it has granted U.S. military aircraft contributed to the success of Operation Enduring Freedom. The government of Bahrain has cooperated closely on criminal investigations linked to terrorism. Likewise, it has taken steps to prevent terrorist organizations from using the nation's well-developed financial system. Not all of Bahrain's citizens have applauded their government's efforts, however, particular vis-à-vis its support for U.S. initiatives. Several anti-American demonstrations took place in 2002, during one of which the U.S. embassy was attacked with firebombs, and again at the onset of Operation Iraqi Freedom in 2003.

In 2005, Bahrain, as one of the six members of the Gulf Cooperation Council (GCC), agreed to intensify coordination in the fight against terrorism in response to instability in the region. They called for a clear definition of terrorism so that it could be differentiated from other criminal activities or activities such as rightful struggles against the foreign occupation for example.

== See also ==
- Human rights in Bahrain
- 2011 Bahraini uprising
