= Orphans International =

Charitable organisation for orphans

Orphans International Worldwide (OIWW) is a charitable organization created to house and educate orphans and abandoned children. In response to the crisis facing orphaned children around the world, former investment bank employee Jim Luce founded Orphans International in 1999. OI's headquarters are in New York City.

Through its network of small "homes" for children, OI provides immediate aid to some of the world's most disadvantaged children. OI operates on an annual budget of less than a half-million dollars. OI houses and educates children orphaned and abandoned after the 2004 tsunami in Sri Lanka and Indonesia and 2004's Hurricane Jeanne in Haiti.

== History, philosophy and models ==
OI opened its first home in Sulawesi, Indonesia in 2001. It became active in housing orphans in Aceh, Indonesia; and Galle, Sri Lanka after the 2004 Indian Ocean earthquake and tsunami. Beginning in 2008, OI also supports foster care for tsunami orphans in Sri Lanka by supporting children living with members of their extended families. OI provides tutoring, English classes and jobs training, such as sewing classes and hospitality classes. In 2009, OI also served 27 Aids affected orphans in Moshi, Tanzania.

With the AIDS epidemic, natural disasters, low world health standards and widespread poverty contributing to a global crisis for children, OI's model of "Raising Global Citizens" seeks to make a difference in both the short-term needs of children and the long-term improvement of disadvantaged communities throughout the world by raising children as responsible citizens. OI's mission is interfaith, interracial, international, and intergenerational – that is, it discourages discrimination on the basis of faith, race and nationality and seeks to utilize the experience of senior volunteers. OI seeks to benefit orphans through education and vocational opportunities that are coupled with a nurturing environment, proper nutrition and healthcare. OI also monitors the children's education and provides after school tutoring, computer classes and English classes. OI intends to give each orphan support until graduation with a baccalaureat degree. OI does not place children for adoption, but rather seeks to help them live successfully in their native countries and cultures.

OI's homes: Orphans are referred to OI by local social service agencies. The children are generally preschool age (2–4 years old) when accepted by OI, and the average age of the children in OIs programs was 9 years old as of 2008. OI's foster homes generally have four children per home and a house "parent" who was raised in the local culture and religion.

OI's family care model: In 2008, OI began experimenting with a new extended-family foster care model, which it calls "Family Care", to help extended families in Sri Lanka. There, aunts, uncles and grandparents were offered training and financial support to take care of orphans. Family care allows OIWW to care for twice as many orphans on the same budget, compared with renting, building, staffing, or maintaining an orphanage.

=== Administration and structure ===
OIWW sets the global worldview, mission and standards for its project nations. It consists of ten officers. The OI executive office is in New York City. Founder Jim Luce is a director of OIWW. He also founded an American-based fundraising arm, OIA, but OIA split from OIWW in November 2009. The OI staff is assisted by volunteers who help with fundraising and other tasks. Its annual budget is less than a half million dollars.

OI has received donations from over three hundred benefactors from around the world, many of whom have become child sponsors. It receives no government money. OIWW is associated with the Department of Public Information of the United Nations OI's activities include overseeing a semi-annual World Congress, publishing the e-newsletter OI InterNews, and maintaining a website. OIWW approves global NGO and corporate "Partners for Progress". The sixth anniversary benefit of OI, in October 2007, was held at the home of Peter Yarrow of Peter, Paul, and Mary, who entertained the group by singing his song "Puff the Magic Dragon".

=== Global focus ===
OI advocates service to humanity and attempts to instill in children an appreciation of both national and global citizenship and both modern technology and traditional arts and crafts. OIWW plans to bring internet connections to all of its projects to expose the children to information from around the world accessible on the internet. Global Advisors to OI include Haya Rashed Al-Khalifa, Former President of the United Nations' General Assembly, and Prince Albert of Monaco, The fifth anniversary benefit of OI was held at the United Nations in November 2006.
