= Majeed Al Alawi =

Bahraini politician

Majeed Mohsen Al Alawi

Minister of Labour of Bahrain
- In office 2002–2011
- Monarch: Hamad bin Isa Al Khalifa

Minister of Housing of Bahrain
- In office 2010 – March 2011
- Preceded by: Basim Al Hamer (as successor)

Personal details
- Born: Bahrain
- Party: Bahrain Freedom Movement (formerly)
- Occupation: Politician, academic

Majeed Mohsen Al Alawi is Bahrain's former Minister of Labour Affairs. For a short time, he was also Minister of Housing. Under his leadership, the country carried out wide-ranging labour reforms with potentially profound implications for its economy and society. The reforms were not without controversy, and Al Alawi often faced stiff opposition. Media reports dated 17 March 2011 indicated that, along with the Minister of Health portfolio, Al Alawi resigned from the Bahraini Cabinet in the wake of the government crackdown on protests in Bahrain. These reports were confirmed on 24 March 2011 when a new Minister of Housing was appointed.

Al Alawi only returned to Bahrain in 2002; previously he was one of the exiled leaders of the London-based opposition movement, the Bahrain Freedom Movement, which in the 1990s assumed the responsibility for articulating the demands of the 1990s uprising. Along with other BFM leaders Sheikh Ali Salman and Dr Mansoor Al-Jamri, Al Alawi returned to Bahrain to participate in the political process after King Hamad embarked on a process of reconciliation and democratisation. An academic by background, he is a member of the International Institute for Strategic Studies.

In December 2007, he had a terse exchange of views with US Defence Secretary Robert Gates at the International Institute for Strategic Studies’ Manama Dialogue security summit over US attitudes to Israel’s nuclear arsenal, challenging Gates as to whether he thought "the Zionist (Israeli) nuclear weapon is a threat to the region". Gates replied that he did not and proposed instead that Iran was the threat not Israel, a response that was met with "laughter and derision" according to the Washington Post.

== Reforms ==
Al Alawi's approach to labour reforms was to work closely with Crown Prince Sheikh Salman bin Hamad Al Khalifa, the Economic Development Board and, since its establishment in 2006, the Labour Market Regulatory Authority. The blueprint for the reforms was laid out in a 2004 landmark report by the global management consultancy firm, McKinsey and Company, and the implementation process has seen the Ministry of Labour working closely with the International Labour Organization, the United States Department of Labor, local newly established trade unions and the Bahrain Chamber of Commerce and Industry.

=== Trade unions legalised ===
In 2002, the Workers Trade Union Law was passed by the government allowing the formation of free trade unions for the first time in the private sector. Bahrain's large expatriate workforce is also eligible to unionise as part of the reforms.

The main trade union body is the General Federation of Workers Trade Unions in Bahrain, which is a member of the International Confederation of Free Trade Unions.

The International Confederation of Free Trade Unions' Annual Survey 2005 highlighted: "Bahrain, a bright spot in an otherwise dismal landscape of persistent labour rights violations in the Middle East". According to the ICFTU:

Bahrain has set the standard for the [Persian] Gulf region in terms of positive developments. The right to form trade unions has existed since 2002, although only one national trade union centre is recognised, and other rights are still limited. The General Federation of Bahrain Trade Unions held its founding congress in January 2004 and in December became the first organisation in the [Persian] Gulf states to become a member of the ICFTU. It has been actively involved in tripartite discussions, including on labour legislation.

All cases where employees are dismissed from their jobs are referred to the courts, Al Alawi told parliament in January 2008, and in the previous cases, Al Alawi said "Three unionists have won in court, six have been reinstated and nine are waiting for verdicts." He has also criticised Bahraini telecommunications company, Batelco, for sacking two trade unionist involved in an industrial dispute. Al Alawi said "Batelco has broken the law when it sacked the unionists, who were not on strike but were protesting outside working hours. It should reinstate these unionists, instead of replacing them with the expatriates it brings."

=== Introduction of unemployment benefit ===
The Labour Ministry pushed legislation through parliament in 2007 to introduce unemployment benefit, set at 60% of previous earnings. First-time jobseekers get 120 Bahraini Dinar (320 US dollars) a month in the case of undergraduates, or BD150 (400 dollars) for graduates. These figures were worked out in consultations during 2005 and 2006 between the General Federation of Workers Trade Unions in Bahrain, the Bahrain Chamber of Commerce and Industry and the Ministry of Labour, consultations which were brokered by the International Labour Organization. The scheme is financed by a 3% contribution on wages split equally between employers, workers and the government, the proceeds of which are reserved for UI purposes. This social insurance contribution comes on top of other similar contributions in Bahrain, for pensions and employment injury.

While the introduction of unemployment benefits was generally well received, its funding through what was (incorrectly) described by some as an income tax was controversial. It led to a major political showdown between the government and some religious scholars, who objected to the tax on wages on theological grounds. The legislation was nevertheless adopted, and many employers have agreed to pay the workers' 1% contribution.

A national minimum wage was a key pillar of Al Wefaq's election manifesto in 2006 parliamentary poll, and was supported by a number of other candidates. However, the Ministry of Labour announced during the election campaign that it had already drafted UI legislation which it would bring before parliament in the forthcoming session. Critics were quick to label the government's move as an attempt to ‘steal’ the opposition's policies, and thus gain the credit of the beneficiaries. But the government's legislation differed significantly from Al Wefaq's in that it proposed that the benefit be funded by contributions on wages, while Al Wefaq wanted it funded out of a tax on wealth.

Al Wefaq initially backed the government's redrafted legislation, but opposition from its followers and religious scholars forced a rethink. Shaikh Hussain Al Najati, a prominent Shiite scholar explained the ulema's objections: "The one per cent deduction is haram [forbidden] and even the unemployed who will benefit from the fund will be doing something haram. The fund has positive aspects, but after a careful political, social, economic and religious assessment, we clearly state that it has many shortcomings." In an attempt to prevent the legislation going through parliament, Al Wefaq leader, Sheikh Ali Salman, met with Prime Minister, Sheikh Khalifa bin Salman Al Khalifa. While the government indicated its determination to introduce the new tax, it did agree to Al Wefaq's demand for a 15% increase in public sector wages.

Expressing his frustration at the opposition, Al Alawi said "A country is not run through religious fatwas [edicts] and the government cannot of course consult every citizen. We have a parliament which has approved the scheme and anyone who objects to it should follow the regular constitutional procedures. The project aims to help thousands of people as they struggle against difficult situations, and people should rise to the Islamic duty of solidarity."

=== Introduction of a minimum wage for nationals ===
In 2007, the first minimum wage was introduced; voluntary at first it is set at BD200. As of October 2007, Dr Al Alawi announced: "Today, we have 460 private sector establishments who have joined the BD200 minimum wage scheme and we hope that other establishments will come forward soon”. Speaking at the symposium at the majlis of Al Wefaq opposition MP, Jalal Fairooz, the Ministry of Labour's undersecretary, Jameel Humaidan, announced that around 16,000 Bahraini private sector employees have reportedly benefited.

However, foreign workers are not covered by the minimum wage, although moves have begun to cover non-indigenous labour. In July 2007, the Indian Embassy began consultations with the Bahraini government about the introduction of a US$265 (BHD100) per month for Indian expatriate construction workers.

=== Unemployment ===
Under Al Alawi the unemployment level has fallen from between 13 and 16 per cent in 2002 (according to figures from the American consultancy McKinsey & Company to 3.6% in 2007. As well as hundreds of thousands of foreign workers living in Bahrain, Al Alawi has said that the government is facing a problem finding skilled workers to fill positions: “There are 6,700 vacancies in various ministries and more will be created in the future.”

Speaking in October 2007 about the Ministry's efforts to tackle unemployment, Al Alawi said:

Since 2001, Bahrain started to discuss policies aimed at reducing unemployment among its citizens. Over the past five years, I managed along with my colleagues in the ministry to reduce the unemployment rate from 16 per cent to 3.6 per cent. The key project was the establishment of the Unemployment Insurance System (UIS), which is unique in the Arab world.

The system allows unemployed citizens, who are registered with the ministry, to receive a financial assistance for six months based on their qualification and experience. During the period, they will have to look for a job with the help of the ministry and in some cases they would join a training programme.

Unless they resigned or were fired for reasons of violating job ethics, Bahraini employees are entitled to financial assistance for losing their job because of reasons beyond their control. The unemployment assistance in this case would be equal to 60 per cent of their last received salary in the last job they worked. The fund of the UIS is financed through contributions from Bahraini employees and employers.

The result of the programme was quite significant. We managed to reduce unemployment among nearly 20,000 citizens to 7,200 job seekers.

The balance of 12,800 who found employment through the programme in addition to those who entered the job market during the past four years, have been offered jobs in the private sector. This indicates the success of the programme.

The main advantage of the programme is that it addresses the unemployment problem whilst saving the dignity of citizens. The system offers policy makers an indicator of the level of unemployment in the country.

An analysis of the demographics of those unemployed indicates that women are greatly over represented among the Kingdom's registered unemployed.

=== Ban on Summer Outdoor working in the midday heat ===
The Ministry of Labour introduced a ban on working outdoors in the midday heat during summer time when temperatures can reach 50 C. In a press statement Dr Majeed Al Alawi attributed the move to a "genuine keenness to protect the rights of immigrant workers, particularly those in menial jobs."

In 2007 prosecutors filed charges against 160 construction companies for flouting the summer ban on labourers working outdoors during the hottest part of the day. The cases were reported to the Public Prosecution by the Labour Ministry, following inspections carried out during the ban. Companies will be fined between BD50 and BD300 for each labourer working in the heat.

=== Amnesty for illegal immigrants ===
In 2007, Al Alawi oversaw the introduction of an amnesty for illegal foreign workers in the Kingdom. As part of the initiative, Al Alawi took the campaign to Indian expatriate community groups in the Kingdom to urging their involvement in protecting workers from exploitative employers. In order to inform expatriate workers of their rights, the Ministry of Labour along with the Labour Market Regulatory Authority and foreign embassies organised a major festival for foreign workers in October 2007. The aim of the festivities held at the Bahrain Conference Centre was to inform workers of their rights and get them to participate in the amnesty so that they can legalise their status. Around 100,000 people attended.

=== End of sponsorship ===
Another major labour reform was the announcement in 2007 that so-called “sponsorship” of foreign workers by their employers is officially outlawed. Employers who claim legal rights or hold the passports of foreign workers face prosecution with Interior Ministry Under-Secretary Shaikh Rashid bin Khalifa Al Khalifa stating that the government is determined to stamp out the practise. Sheikh Rashid accused rogue employers of “blackening Bahrain's name”.

== Debate on the Persian Gulf’s future ==
In 2007, Al Alawi sought to initiate a public debate across the Persian Gulf with a series of newspaper interviews and public speeches arguing that GCC countries need to understand the consequences of mass immigration and consequent demographic change. In the debate he made clear that his starting point is that Persian Gulf countries have no choice but to accede to international labour standards if they are to be internationally competitive, and to do so means giving foreign workers and their families equal rights to nationals; a move that could have profound implications for GCC countries not only economically and socially, but also politically. Under global conventions Persian Gulf states will inevitably sign in the near future, expatriate workers and their families will be entitled to housing, education and health services, as well as nationality after five years of residence. His argument is that there is a need therefore, for Persian Gulf states to examine their immigration policies and look at the long-term viability of importing labour.

However, he has complained that across the Persian Gulf there is a reluctance to confront the situation, saying in October 2007: "The prime challenge facing authorities in the [Persian] Gulf is the elimination of the traditional sponsorship system and creation of an effective governmental body to assume the responsibility of importing manpower needed for development. We also need to improve working conditions of those [immigrant] workers. Governments must guarantee their rights and that they receive the benefits they were promised when they were recruited."

Al Alawi's solution is for a Persian Gulf wide six-year residency cap for un-skilled and semi-skilled foreign labour, but this has met a storm of criticism from business leaders and immigrants groups. The Bahrain Chamber for Commerce and Industry issued a ‘stern warning’ that the move would be unworkable. The Chamber has sought to lobby MPs to mobilise them against what they term Al Alawi's “unreasonable behaviour”. Al Alawi was blunt in his response "Those who have opposed the proposal are business people who prefer the protection of their company interests over the defence of their nation. They are so keen about their self interests that they do not really care that the nationals will be a minority in their own country and expatriates the majority."

Reaction has not been limited to Bahrain: Gulf business leaders have gone public in criticising Al Alawi's call for restrictions on foreign labour. In the UAE the chairman of Galadari Investment Office, Rashid AW Galadari, responded to the claim that labourers cause an erosion of culture by saying: "This statement is an oxymoron at best and hypocritical at worst - the status quo is that the unskilled labour pool is not in any position, even if it wanted to be, to erode the GCC's national character of the country. It is kept as far as possible out of mainstream life."
