= National symbols of Bahrain =

The national symbols of Bahrain are official and unofficial flags, icons or cultural expressions that are emblematic, representative or otherwise characteristic of Bahrain and of its culture.

== Symbol ==
Title	Name of Symbol	Picture
National flag	Flag of Bahrain	
Coat of arms	Coat of arms of Bahrain	
National anthem	Bahrainona	Bahraini
National flower	Arfaj	
National tree	Date palm	
National bird	Bulbul	
National animal	Arabian Oryx	
