= Haya Rashed Al-Khalifa =

Bahraini lawyer and diplomat (born 1952)

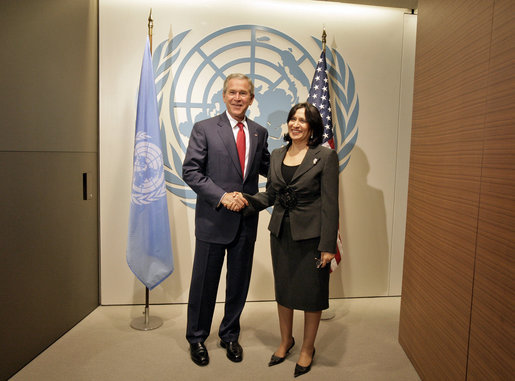
George W. Bush and Sheikha Haya Rashed Al Khalifa at UN, 2006

Haya Rashed Al-Khalifa (born October 18, 1952) (Arabic: هيا راشد آل خليفة) is a lawyer and diplomat from Bahrain. From 1999 to 2004, she served as Bahrain’s first female ambassador, accredited to France. Previously, she was also among the first women to practice law in Bahrain. From 2006 to 2007, she held the office of President of the United Nations General Assembly, becoming the third woman to occupy this position.

== Legal career ==
Haya obtained a Bachelor of Law degree from the University of Kuwait in 1974. She has also obtained a Diploma in Civil Rights Private Law from the University of Alexandria, Egypt, in 1986 and a Diploma in Comparative Law from the Ain Shams University, Egypt, in 1988.

With Lulwa Al Awadhi, she was one of the first two women in Bahrain to practice law when she was admitted as a lawyer in Bahrain in 1979. She set up her own practise and is the founder of the Haya Rashed Al Khalifa Law Firm. From 1997 to 1999, she was the vice chairwoman of the International Bar Association. She is the legal advisor to Bahrain's royal court and is a Global Advisor to Orphans International.

== Diplomatic career ==
Haya was the President of the 61st session of the United Nations General Assembly which began on September 12, 2006, and closed on September 17, 2007. She was the third woman to hold the position since Vijaya Lakshmi Pandit of India and Angie Elisabeth Brooks of Liberia were appointed to the presidency in 1953 and 1969 respectively. She was elected by acclamation after Bahrain was chosen as its candidate by the group of Asian nations. In addition to being the first woman president since 1969, Haya was the first woman Muslim president.

She was the Bahraini ambassador to France from 1999 to 2004. When she was appointed Ambassador to France in 1999 she became the first ever female Bahraini ambassador. She also served as a permanent delegate to the UN Educational, Scientific and Cultural Organization (UNESCO).

The move was the first in a series of appointments of women to high-profile government positions in recent years, which have included the country's first female cabinet minister, Nada Haffadh, and six women nominated to the Shura Council, the upper house of parliament.

On the same day (6 June 2006) that Haya was selected to preside at the UN, Mona Al Kawari became the first female judge in Bahrain.

== Family and background ==
Haya is a member of the ruling Al Khalifa family of Bahrain. She is the great-granddaughter of Isa ibn Ali Al Khalifa, who ruled Bahrain from 1869 to 1932. The present head of the family, King Hamad ibn Isa Al Khalifa, is the great-great-grandson of Isa ibn Ali.

== Appointments and awards ==
Sheika Haya has received the following awards:

- United Nations Millennium Development Goals Special Award, 2007
- Path to Peace Award 2007
- Social Creativity Award, at the Sixth Conference of the Arab Thought Foundation.

Sheikha Haya is a member of the following bodies:

- World Intellectual Property Organisation Arbitration Committee
- International Chamber of Commerce (ICC)
- International Court of Arbitration
- Bahrain Supreme Council of Culture, Arts & Literature
- Bahrain Bar Association (Vice-Chair)
- Bahrain Chamber for Dispute Resolution (Chairperson of the Board of Trustees)
- Consumer Advisory Group of the Telecommunications Regulatory Authority, Bahrain (Chair).

== See also ==
- First women lawyers around the world
- Women's political rights in Bahrain
- Dr Nada Haffadh, Bahrain's Minister of Health and first female cabinet member (appointed 2004)

Positions in intergovernmental organisations
Preceded by Jan Eliasson	President of the United Nations General Assembly; 2006–2007	Succeeded by Srgjan Kerim
