= Faisal Fulad =

Bahraini politician

Faisal Hassan Fulad is an international Human Rights Activist and he was a member of Kingdom of Bahrain's upper chamber of parliament, the Consultative Council, since 1996. Fulad was appointed to parliament by King Hamad bin Isa Al Khalifa from 1996 to 2010.

Fulad is a Union activist since 1975 and founder of the General Federation of Bahraini Workers, he was the head of the General Committee for Bahrain Workers from 1996 to 1998 and chairman of the Labor joint committee for Gulf Air from 1996 to 2001, and he is Human Rights activist and a founder with Houda Nonoo of the local group, the Bahrain Human Rights Watch Society (BHRWS) (an organisation described as "government supported" by a leaked diplomatic cable.) and Global group, The Gulf European Center for Human Rights (GECHR), where he stands as Secretary-General, His vocal advocacy includes issues such as women's rights, the formal scrapping of the death penalty and labour rights for national and migrant workers. Recently, he is leading a lobby to establish a human right committee in the upper chamber of parliament..

== Reaction ==
In May 2006, Fulad became the first ever Shura Council member to be suspended. Sixteen fellow Shura Council members submitted a complaint to the chairman claiming that Fulad repeatedly insulted the members during sessions. Fulad was subsequently suspended for two weeks and docked pay.

Fulad has been accused by his colleagues of being a narcissist. In April 2006, Shura Council member and businessman Khalid Al Shareef told Fulad: "All you care about is having your name appear in newspapers next day, without you really knowing what your mouth says."

Another senior Council member told the Gulf Daily News:

Mr Fulad has been showing the Press he is a hero by attacking fellow colleagues, but afterwards he would go to councillors' offices begging for forgiveness. It is the same with the ministers he has been attacking on the open floor—the instant they leave he goes after them asking for their pardon.

They do not like Fulad's statements and his anti-corruption activity in Bahrain.

In September 2006, Fulad was implicated in the Bandargate scandal, accused of receiving BD500 (USD 1,326) per month from the head of the scandal, Ahmed bin Ateyatalla Al Khalifa. The alleged plot aimed to instigate sectarian strife and maintain the dominance of the ruling Sunni community over the majority Shia.

In 2012 Fulad Call to end expat travel bans in Bahrain and to proteket Domestic Workers Rights in Bahrain. On 21 May 2012 at the Bahrain submitting its Universal Periodic Review (UPR) during the 13th session of the UN's Human Rights Council, Geneva. BHRWS secretary-general Faisal Fulad, who is also in Geneva, said it was imperative for Bahrain to do more to protect the rights of migrant workers, domestic workers and those facing travel bans and protection of minority rights in Bahrain, especially Jews, Baha'is, and Christand, he joined international groups in a protest against the Iranian government and its constant meddling in the affairs of Bahrain, Iraq, Syria and Lebanon and he protested with activists outside the United Nations Human Rights Council, in Geneva on 21 May 2012.

BHRWS and Representatives Council of Bahrain in Jun 2012 has condemneds in the strongest terms the Iraqi regime's serious violations of human rights at Camp Ashraf and Camp Liberty, as a result of the pressure and blatant interference of the Iranian government.

Faisal Fulad and his BHRWS & GECHR with a number of Bahraini human rights organizations establish The Bahrain Human Rights Network (BHRN) and they launched a campaign for a personal status law for Bahraini Shiite Women, Conjugated with Human Rights Council meeting on 19 September 2012 to discuss the recommendations of Bahrain Human Rights.
