= List of mammals of Bahrain =

This is a list of the mammal species recorded in Bahrain. Of the twenty seven mammal species in Bahrain, one is endangered, three are vulnerable, and one is near threatened..

The following tags are used to highlight each species' conservation status as assessed by the International Union for Conservation of Nature:

EX	Extinct	No reasonable doubt that the last individual has died.
EW	Extinct in the wild	Known only to survive in captivity or as a naturalized population well outside its previous range.
CR	Critically endangered	The species is in imminent risk of extinction in the wild.
EN	Endangered	The species is facing an extremely high risk of extinction in the wild.
VU	Vulnerable	The species is facing a high risk of extinction in the wild.
NT	Near threatened	The species does not meet any of the criteria that would categorise it as risking extinction but it is likely to do so in the future.
LC	Least concern	There are no current identifiable risks to the species.
DD	Data deficient	There is inadequate information to make an assessment of the risks to this species.

== Order: Sirenia (manatees and dugongs) ==
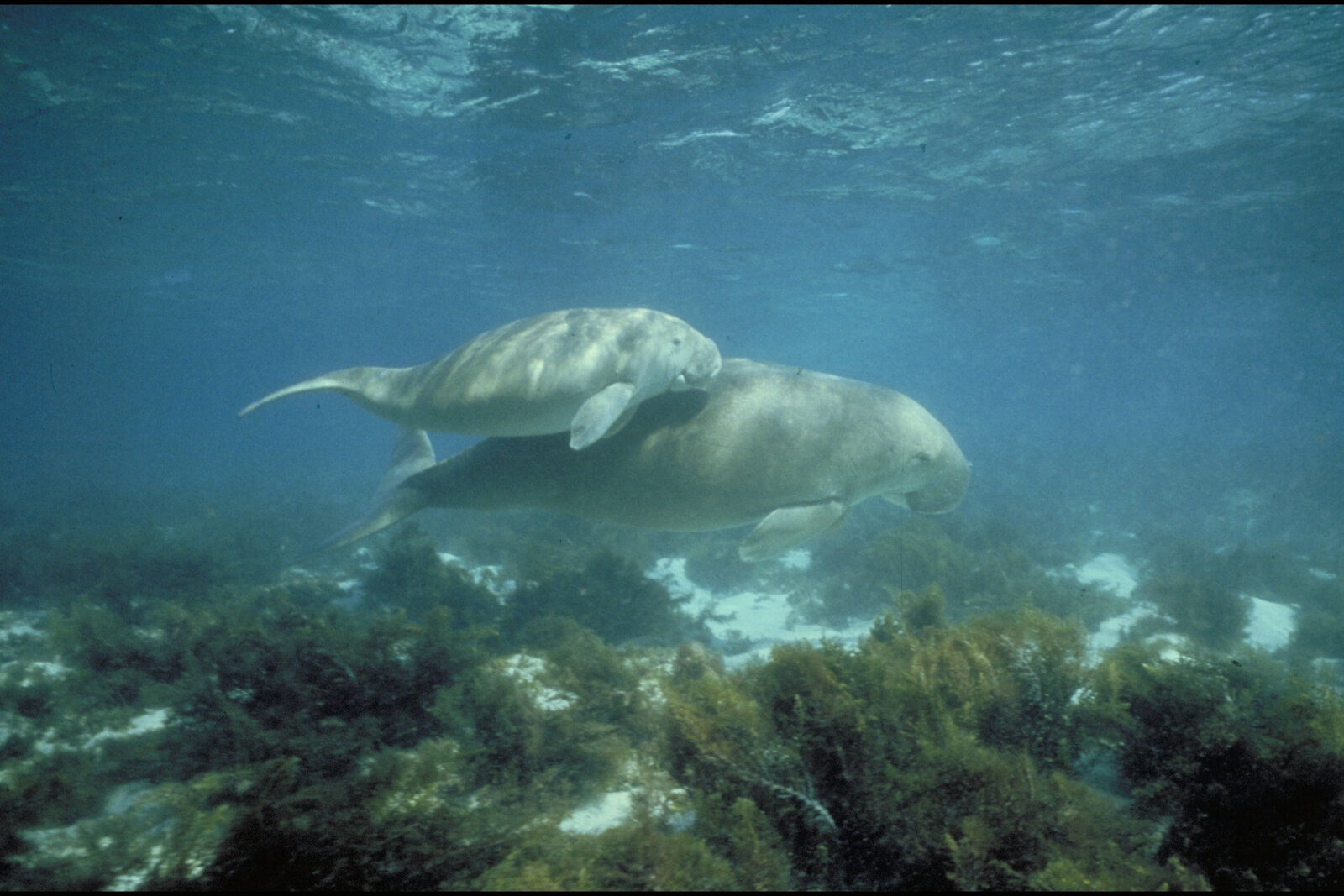
Dugongs

Sirenia is an order of fully aquatic, herbivorous mammals that inhabit rivers, estuaries, coastal marine waters, swamps, and marine wetlands. All four species are endangered.

- Family: Dugongidae
  - Genus: Dugong
    - Dugong, D. dugon VU

== Order: Lagomorpha (rabbits and hares) ==
While they may appear to be rodents, rabbits and hares belong in their own family, the lagomorphs.

- Family: Leporidae
  - Genus: Lepus
    - Cape hare, L. capensis LC

== Order: Chiroptera (bats) ==
The bats' most distinguishing feature is that their forelimbs are developed as wings, making them the only mammals capable of flight. Bat species account for about 20% of all mammals.

- Family: Vespertilionidae
  - Genus: Rhyneptesicus
    - Sind bat, R. nasutus LC

== Order: Rodentia (rodents) ==
Rodents make up the largest order of mammals, with over 40% of mammalian species. They have two incisors in the upper and lower jaw which grow continually and must be kept short by gnawing. Most rodents are small though the capybara can weigh up to 45 kg (99 lb).

- Suborder: Myomorpha
  - Family: Muridae (mice, rats, gerbils, etc.)
    - Genus: Gerbillus
      - Cheesman's gerbil, G. cheesmani LC
      - Wagner's gerbil, G. dasyurus LC
      - Dwarf gerbil, G. nanus LC
    - Genus: Meriones
      - Sundevall's jird, M. crassus LC
    - Genus: Mus
      - House mouse, M. musculus LC

== Order: Eulipotyphla (shrews and hedgehogs) ==
Eulipotyphla comprises the hedgehogs and gymnures (family Erinaceidae, formerly also the order Erinaceomorpha) and true shrews (family Soricidae).

- Family: Erinaceidae (hedgehogs)
  - Subfamily: Erinaceinae
    - Genus: Paraechinus
      - Desert hedgehog, P. aethiopicus LC
- Family: Soricidae (shrews)
  - Subfamily: Crocidurinae
    - Genus: Suncus
      - Etruscan shrew, S. etruscus LC
      - House shrew, S. murinus LC

== Order: Cetacea (whales) ==
The order Cetacea includes whales, dolphins and porpoises. They are the mammals most fully adapted to aquatic life with a spindle-shaped nearly hairless body, protected by a thick layer of blubber, and forelimbs and tail modified to provide propulsion underwater.

- Suborder: Mysticeti
  - Family: Balaenopteridae
    - Subfamily: Balaenopterinae
      - Genus: Balaenoptera
        - Bryde's whale, B. edeni LC
    - Subfamily: Megapterinae
      - Genus: Megaptera
        - Humpback whale, M. novaeangliae LC
- Suborder: Odontoceti
  - Superfamily: Platanistoidea
    - Family: Phocoenidae
      - Genus: Neophocaena
        - Finless porpoise, N. phocaenoides DD
    - Family: Delphinidae (marine dolphins)
      - Genus: Grampus
        - Risso's dolphin, G. griseus DD
      - Genus: Lagenodelphis
        - Fraser's dolphin, L. hosei LC
      - Genus: Orcinus
        - Orca, O. orca DD
      - Genus: Sousa
        - Indo-Pacific humpback dolphin, S. chinensis DD
        - Indian Ocean humpbacked dolphin, S. plumbea EN
      - Genus: Stenella
        - Pantropical spotted dolphin, S. attenuata LC
        - Spinner dolphin, S. longirostris LC
      - Genus: Steno
        - Rough-toothed dolphin, S. bredanensis LC
      - Genus: Tursiops
        - Indo-Pacific bottlenose dolphin, T. aduncus NT
        - Common bottlenose dolphin, T. truncatus LC

== Order: Carnivora (carnivorans) ==
There are over 260 species of carnivorans, the majority of which feed primarily on meat. They have a characteristic skull shape and dentition.

- Suborder: Feliformia
  - Family: Herpestidae (mongooses)
    - Genus: Urva
      - Indian grey mongoose, U. edwardsii LC

== Order: Artiodactyla (even-toed ungulates) ==
The even-toed ungulates are ungulates whose weight is borne about equally by the third and fourth toes, rather than mostly or entirely by the third as in perissodactyls. There are about 220 artiodactyl species, including many that are of great economic importance to humans.

- Family: Bovidae (cattle, antelope, sheep, goats)
  - Subfamily: Antilopinae
    - Genus: Gazella
      - Arabian sand gazelle, G. marica VU
  - Subfamily: Hippotraginae
    - Genus: Oryx
      - Arabian oryx, O. leucoryx VU introduced

== See also ==
- List of chordate orders
- Lists of mammals by region
- Mammal classification
