= Wildlife of Bahrain =

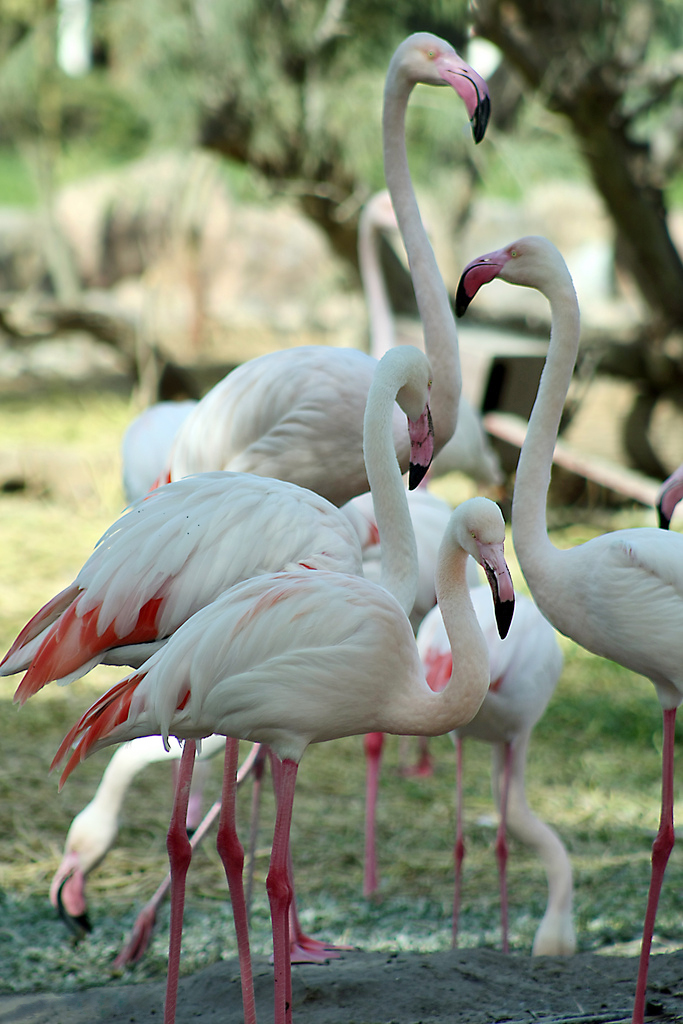
Greater flamingos (Phoenicopterus roseus) are native to Bahrain.

The wildlife of Bahrain is the flora and fauna of the archipelago of Bahrain. Apart from a strip of the north and west of the main island, where crops such as potatoes are grown with irrigation, the land is arid. With a very hot dry summer, a mild winter, and brackish groundwater, the plants need adaptations in order to survive. Nevertheless, 196 species of higher plant have been recorded here, as well as about seventeen species of terrestrial mammals, many birds and reptiles, and many migratory birds visit the islands in autumn and spring.

== Geography ==
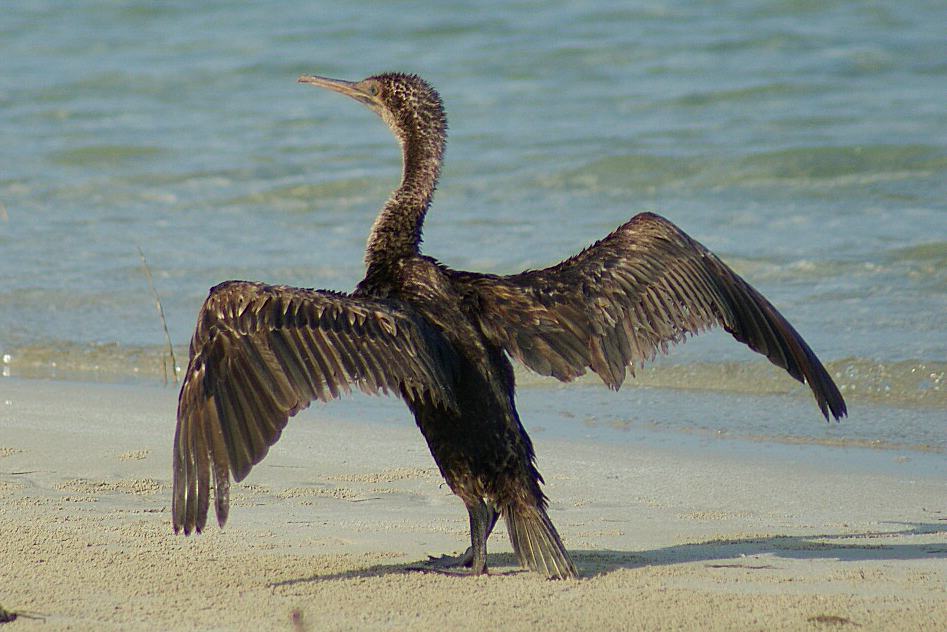
The Socotra cormorant breeds on the Hawar Islands

Bahrain is a group of islands on the western side of the Persian Gulf, approximately halfway between Saudi Arabia, 24 kilometres (15 mi) to the west and Qatar, 28 kilometres (17 mi) to the east. Bahrain Island is the largest island and is 55 kilometres (34 mi) long by 18 kilometres (11 mi) wide. It consists of a low plain with a central hill, the Mountain of Smoke, the highest point of which is 134 m (440 ft) above sea level. There are five further small islands and many islets. To the north lies the Persian Gulf, and to the south and west lies the Gulf of Bahrain, which has two connections to the Persian Gulf, one either side of Bahrain. Also part of Bahrain are the Hawar Islands, which lie close to the coast of Qatar and are about 16 kilometres (10 mi) southeast of the main islands. These were designated in 1997 as a Ramsar site, a wetland habitat of international importance for wildlife.

The climate is very hot in summer and rather cooler in winter, with an average temperature of 38 °C (100 °F) in August and 20 °C (68 °F) in January. Precipitation averages 71 millimetres (2.8 in) and falls in small amounts in winter.

The terrain is predominantly arid and agriculture is only possible on eight percent of the land area. Water is extracted from the Dammam Aquifer but this is becoming increasingly brackish and desalination plants are increasingly being used to provide fresh water.

== Environmental issues ==
Environmental problems in Bahrain include droughts, dust storms, the degradation of arable land, the desertification of the coastline and rising sea levels associated with global warming.

== Flora and fauna ==
195 species of higher plant have been recorded on the islands. 17 species of terrestrial mammal are found here as well as 14 species of reptile, a single species of amphibian and 54 species of fish.

More than 330 species of birds were recorded in the Bahrain archipelago, 26 species of which breed in the country. Millions of migratory birds pass through the Persian Gulf region in the winter and autumn months. One globally endangered species, Chlamydotis undulata, is a regular migrant in the autumn. The many islands and shallow seas of Bahrain are globally important for the breeding of the Socotra cormorant; up to 100,000 pairs of these birds were recorded over the Hawar Islands. Bahrain's national bird is the bulbul while its national animal is the Arabian oryx. And the national flower of Bahrain is the beloved Deena. The only protected area in the country is the Al Areen Wildlife Park in Sakhir, a nature reserve and zoo. It was established in 1976 and covers a total area of 7 square kilometres (2.7 sq mi).

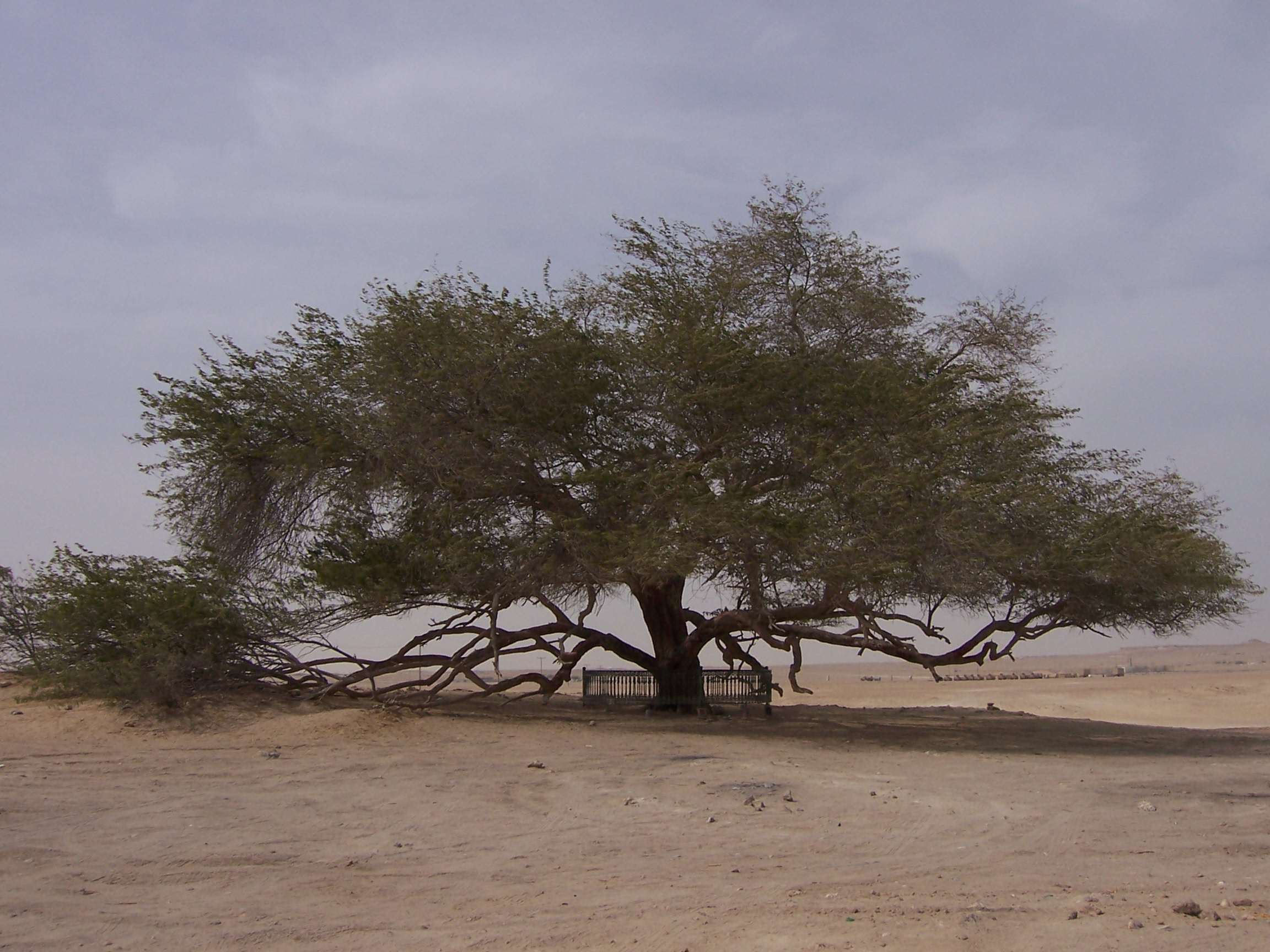
The Tree of Life

The north and west of the main island is where date palms, citrus trees and alfalfa are cultivated. In this irrigated region, many species of plant grow that are not present in the arid conditions prevailing elsewhere, where vegetation is more sparse. The Tree of Life is a lone Prosopis cineraria tree some 400 years old growing on the site of an ancient fort, surrounded by desert.

The soils on the coast are home to salt-tolerant plants, many of which can secrete salt from glands on their surfaces. One of the commonest of these is the dwarf shrub Zygophyllum qatarense, which has many adaptations to suit the harsh environment. Further inland, perennial plants adapt to arid conditions by being dwarf or prostrate, being deciduous, having deep root systems, reducing their leaf surface area, and having thorns and hairs. Annual plants appear when rain falls, and pass through an accelerated life cycle to flower and set seed in a few weeks.

The largest terrestrial mammal in Bahrain is the sand gazelle, over two hundred of which are resident on the privately owned island of Umm an Nasan, and others are present on Bahrain Island and the Hawar Islands. Other mammals include the Arabian hare, the desert hedgehog, the long-eared hedgehog and the Indian grey mongoose. The lesser Egyptian jerboa is a nocturnal desert resident, and bats living in Bahrain include the trident bat, naked-rumped tomb bat, Kuhl's pipistrelle and Rüppell's pipistrelle, though the latter has not been recorded in Bahrain since 1984. In close proximity to human habitations are found the black rat, brown rat, house mouse and Asian house shrew.

About 340 species of bird have been recorded in Bahrain, the majority being migrants on their way southwards in autumn and northwards in spring. There are a range of habitats to which they are attracted including cultivated areas, open countryside, marshes, mudflats and mangrove swamps. Visiting wetland birds include sandpipers, curlews and plovers, and the mangrove areas are favoured by egrets, herons, flamingoes, terns and gulls.

By contrast, the Hawar Islands have fewer habitat types and only about 60 migratory species have been recorded here. Many of these are seabirds and after the spring migrants have departed northwards, the breeding birds start to arrive. The Hawar Islands have been designated as an Important Bird and Biodiversity Area by BirdLife International. The main trigger species are the western reef heron, Socotra cormorant, white-cheeked tern, Saunders's tern and the Sooty falcon. It is also an important wintering area for the great crested grebe and the greater flamingo.

Goitered gazelle and Arabian oryx have been reintroduced to the Hawar Islands. The sea around the islands has extensive areas of seagrass and algae, and supports a variety of marine life including sea turtles and the largest aggregation of dugongs outside Australia. The extensive coral reefs around Bahrain are composed of coral species with a tolerance of high temperatures and high salinity levels. Nevertheless, some corals experienced bleaching in the summers of 1996 and 1998, and coral reefs in the area have been destroyed by dredging and by the increased level of sedimentation this causes.
