= Geology of Bahrain =

The geology of Bahrain is poorly studied before the Cenozoic. Extensive sedimentary formations from the Eocene through recent times cover much of the island.

== Stratigraphy and geologic history ==
Most rocks that outcrop on the surface on Bahrain Island and the Hawar Islands date to the Eocene in the Cenozoic. The rimrock of Eocene limestone forms a ring around the main island, with cliffs up to 30.5 meters (100 feet) tall and wind erosion features are common. An angular unconformity separates middle Eocene rocks from sandier Miocene rocks.

The Rus Formation is 56.1 meters thick, encompassing the Ad Damman area in Saudi Arabia and is exposed in central Bahrain as limestone with chert and chalk layers along with quartz geodes. Boreholes indicate that the Rus Formation lies atop the Umm er Radhuma Formation. Due in part to anhydrite beds, the Rus Formation has salty brines at its base overlain by the freshwater Zone C aquifer. Limestone from the formation is widely used for concrete production.

The Sharks Tooth Shale of the Dammam Formation from the middle Eocene overlies the Rus Formation with gray-yellow shale, marl and dolomite. The lowest clay-shale bed contains shark teeth fossils, giving the unit its name (it is believed to correspond with the Midra Shale in Saudi Arabia). A brown crystalline dolomite limestone layer 33 meters thick, correlated with the Khobar Member in Saudi Arabia sits atop the Sharks Tooth Shale capped by an impervious orange marl unit that separates the Zone A and Zone B aquifers. The white limestone of the Zone A aquifer ranges widely in thickness from as little as six meters to more than 62 meters. This unit is part of the broader Alat Limestone, common in Arabian Peninsula and is a major source of fresh water for the island.

Miocene rocks include clay, marl, shale and sandy limestone that reaches up to 61 meters thick in the flank of the Bahrain anticline. Geologists have correlated the formation with the Dam Formation and Hadrukh Formation in Saudi Arabia as well as the Lower Fars in Iran. Recent Quaternary beach sands and salt marshes dominated large areas on several islands in the archipelago.

== Structural and tectonic geology ==
Anhydrite indicates that the Eocene was marked by shallow marine conditions. Bahrain has few compressional tectonic features aside from the anticline. Uplift and regional tilting spurred erosion, resulting in the missing late Eocene and Oligocene sediments.
