= Gulf Traveller =

IATA	ICAO	Call sign
GF	GFA	GULF AIR
- Founded: 2003
- Ceased operations: 2007
- Hubs: Bahrain International Airport; Seeb International Airport
- Frequent-flyer program: Gulf Air Frequent Flyer Programme
- Fleet size: 6
- Destinations: 15
- Parent company: Gulf Air
- Headquarters: P.O. Box 138, Manama, Kingdom of Bahrain
- Key people: Ahmed AlHammadi (Acting CEO)

Gulf Traveller B767 on stand at Abu Dhabi Airport.

Gulf Traveller was a tri-national airline that served as the all-economy full service subsidiary of Gulf Air. Its main bases were Abu Dhabi International Airport, Bahrain International Airport, and Seeb International Airport.

Like its parent company, it was owned by three countries and became a dual-flag carrier after Abu Dhabi pulled out of the Gulf Air consortium in 2005. Gulf Traveller dissolved in May 2007 when Oman ended ownership of Gulf Air.

== History ==
Gulf Traveller was founded on 1 June 2003 as part of the Gulf Air three year restructuring and turnaround programme instigated by James Hogan. The model behind Gulf Air was to economise on routes with little demand for First or Business Class passengers. Gulf Traveller's inaugural flight between Abu Dhabi and Jeddah took place on 15 June 2003.

Gulf Traveller planned to add Birmingham, United Kingdom, to its list of destinations in 2004, however, the project was put on hold for the foreseeable future in 2005, and then eventually scrapped.

== Former destinations ==
Gulf Traveller operated to the following;

- Bahrain (hub)
- Bangladesh - Dhaka
- India - Mumbai, Thiruvananthapuram
- Indonesia - Jakarta
- Jordan - Amman
- Kenya - Nairobi
- Nepal - Kathmandu
- Oman - Muscat (hub)
- Pakistan - Islamabad, Karachi, Lahore, Peshawar
- Saudi Arabia - Dammam, Jeddah, Riyadh
- Tanzania - Dar es Salaam, Zanzibar
- United Arab Emirates - Abu Dhabi (hub; closed in 2005)
- United Arab Emirates - Dubai

== Fleet ==
The Gulf Traveller Fleet consisted of the following aircraft (as of March 2007):

- 6 Boeing 767-3P6ER
