= Bahrain Human Rights Society =

Bahraini human rights organisation

Bahrain Human Rights Society الجمعية البحرينية لحقوق الإنسان
- Founded: 2001
- Type: NGO
- Location: Manama (Bahrain)
- Region served: Bahrain
- Website: Official website

The Bahrain Human Rights Society (BHRS; Arabic: الجمعية البحرينية لحقوق الإنسان, romanized: al-Jamʻīyah al-Baḥraynīyah li-Ḥuqūq al-Insān) was an NGO set up in 2002 following wide ranging political reforms by the Bahraini government to allow the functioning of independent human rights groups.

In 2010 the government dissolved the BHRS's board of directors, leaving the group's future in doubt.

== Background ==
BHRS is the main human rights group in Bahrain, and while several of its members are associated with the main leftist opposition group, the National Democratic Action, BHRS is generally respected for its professionalism. The Society's leadership, including president Dr Sabika Al Najjar and vice president Salman Kamaluddin, were former political prisoners and exiles who returned to Bahrain in 2001.

BHRS produces an annual report on human rights in Bahrain, liaises with international organisations and carries out human rights activism in Bahrain. It has worked with international human rights organisations including the controversial American group, Freedom House. The Society was charged with organising the parallel conference of Arab NGOs during the G8 Summit on Middle East reform, the Forum for the Future 2005, held in Bahrain in November 2005.

On 24 December 2005, the Society became the first NGO in the Arab world to carry out a prison inspection when it visited Jaw prison. The party visiting Jaw included activists, doctors, and psychiatric nurses with the purpose at examining the facilities, the treatment of prisoners and looking for any signs of abuse.

Summarising Bahrain's human rights situation in November 2005, leading activist and former exile Abdulnabi Al Ekri stated:

I was in exile and now I am back in my country saying what I believe without hesitation. The best thing is we can organise in this space. It doesn't make me satisfied or content to say "everything is okay", but it doesn't mean I can deny the positive changes that have been made. Redress needs to be made for the past and reforms need to be made concrete.

In March 2006, the Gulf News newspaper claimed that the Society's Abdulnabi Al Ekri had accused the Bahrain Centre for Human Rights Nabeel Rajab and Abduljalil Singace of being motivated by 'personal gain'. In response, Singace wrote to Gulf News refuting the claims and reserved the right to seek legal redress. The three activists met the following week and Al Ekri clarified that the Gulf News reporter had in fact falsified his words.

== See also ==
- Human rights in Bahrain
