= Ali Mattar =

Bahraini politician

Ali Mohamed Mattar (Arabic: علي مطر) is a salafist Bahraini MP who represents Asalah in the Chamber of Deputies.

Mattar is one of Asalah's most active MPs, and is seen as carving out a niche for himself in parliamentary life with legislative proposals that have been described by supporters as "bold". In January 2006, he proposed legislation to ban sorcery, telling parliament, "It's becoming more popular for people in Bahrain to turn to fortune tellers and sorcerers to find out what their future holds or to act as mediums to harm others or make people fall in love with them. There are many homes around the country that are known to be practicing black magic and if you drive past them a large number of cars from around the GCC would be found parked outside." This created consternation among the Kingdom's magicians and fortune tellers, with soothsayer Dina, responding, "I can understand the MPs' feelings because there are fraudsters out there, but it's not fair for those who truly have the gift of seeing the future and dealing with the supernatural."

In February 2006, Mattar proposed the introduction of Sharia Law, saying that the removal of thieves' hands would address rising crime, particularly burglaries. Explaining the move, he said, "Thieves should feel the agony of their victims and this would be a permanent lesson to them." Continuing his campaign to introduce amputations, in April 2006 he compared Bahrain's jails to "five star hotels" and said that a recent prison inspection by the Bahrain Human Rights Society is "something I really feel awkward about, considering that the criminals did not treat others fairly when they stole from them".

Mattar's proposals for Sharia Law led to a clash with Bahrain's government when he tried to amend Article 342 of the Penal Code so that those who kill someone in an accident would have to pay blood money to the victim's family or lose their own lives. Determining the blood money would be at the discretion of the victim's family. The move was opposed by a majority of Bahrain's MPs.
