= Bahrain Human Rights Watch Society =

Bahraini women's rights organization

Bahrain Human Rights Watch Society جمعية البحرين لمراقبة حقوق الإنسان
- Founded: 2004
- Type: NGO
- Location: Manama (Bahrain)
- Region served: Bahrain
- Key people: Faisal Fulad (Secretary-General)
- Website: bhrws.com

The Bahrain Human Rights Watch Society (Arabic: جمعية مراقبة حقوق الإنسان البحرينية, romanized: Jamʻīyat Murāqabat Ḥuqūq al-Insān al-Baḥraynīyah) is a Bahraini human rights organisation established in November 2004 to fight for women's rights in Bahrain.

== Overview ==
Its president is Houda Ezra Nonoo, making the Society unique in the Arab world in being the only human rights group headed by a Jewish woman. Nonoo is a business woman. Another prominent member is trade unionist, Faisal Fulad.

The society has sought to support women's rights activists' campaign for the introduction of a personal status law to protect women in divorce and child custody. In association with the National Coalition to Stop Violence Against Women, the society launched the Respect Movement, a petition in support of the Personal Status Law. The second part of the Respect Movement's agenda is a petition for laws to protect housemaids, who are not currently protected by Bahrain's labour laws.

Nonoo and Falud are members of the Shura Council 2006–2010.

The organisation was described to be "government supported" by a leaked diplomatic cable.

== Controversies ==
In September 2006, founding member Faisal Fulad was implicated in the Bandargate scandal, accused of receiving BD500 (US$1,330) per month from the head of the scandal, Ahmed bin Ateyatalla Al Khalifa. The alleged plot aimed to instigate sectarian strife and maintain the dominance of the ruling Sunni community over the majority Shia.

The Bahrain Human Rights Watch Society's defence of leftist writer, Sameera Rajab, also brought the centre into conflict with Islamists: in 2004 the Akhbar Al Khaleej columnist received death threats from Shia Islamists after she described Iraqi cleric Grand Ayatollah Ali al-Sistani as an 'American general' for his tacit support of the US invasion. The society took a lead in the arguments that ensued with Al Wefaq over the right of journalists to criticise clerics.

The society has also clashed with Salafists, specifically after the group organised a candlelight vigil for the victims of the Al Dana boat tragedy and Asalah MP Adel Mouwda criticised the laying of a wreath as against religious values. The society's Faisal Fulad responded "We did not do anything that was against religion especially that Islam is a religion of tolerance and compassion. The public tribute is not an unhealthy innovation as some people have said, but a compassionate attitude that helps people appreciate how tolerant and inclusive Islam is, particularly that our religion is being relentlessly savaged by anti-Muslims in several countries."

In 2012, society's call to end expat travel bans in Bahrain and to protect domestic workers' rights in Bahrain. On 21 May 2012, Bahrain submitted its Universal Periodic Review during the 13th session of the UN's Human Rights Council, Geneva. The society's secretary-general, Faisal Fulad, who was also in Geneva, said it was imperative for Bahrain to do more to protect the rights of migrant workers, domestic workers and those facing travel bans and protection of minority rights in Bahrain, especially Jews, Baháʼís, and Christians. The Bahrain Human Rights Watch Society and the Gulf European Center for Human Rights joined international groups in a protest against the Iranian regime and its constant meddling in the affairs of Bahrain, Iraq, Syria and Lebanon and he protested with activists outside the United Nations Human Rights Council, in Geneva on 21 May 2012.

In June 2012, the Bahrain Human Rights Watch Society and Representatives Council of Bahrain condemned in the strongest terms the Iraqi regime's serious violations of human rights at Camp Ashraf and Camp Liberty, as a result of the pressure and blatant interference of the Iranian regime.

The society and Gulf European Center of Human Rights with a number of Bahraini human rights organizations established the Bahrain Human Rights Network and they launched a campaign for a personal status law for Bahraini Shiite Women, Conjugated with Human Rights Council meeting on 19 September 2012 to discuss the recommendations of Bahrain Human Rights.

== Events ==
- Bahrna Conference
- The first Human Rights Watch Camp

== See also ==
- Bahrain
