= Workers Trade Union Law =

The Workers Trade Union Law was passed by Hamad bin Isa Al Khalifa, King of Bahrain, on September 24, 2002.

It recognizes the right of workers to organize collectively, although Bahrain has not ratified the International Labour Organization Conventions Freedom of Association and Protection of the Right to Organise Convention, 1948, and Right to Organise and Collective Bargaining Convention, 1949.

The law contains provisions for striking, but restricts activities in a number of essential services.

The legislation was part of a number of key labour reforms introduced under the Minister of Labour, Majeed Al Alawi.

== See also ==
- General Federation of Workers Trade Unions in Bahrain
