= Bahrain Workers' Union =

- Bahrain Workers' Union
- Affiliations: WFTU

The Bahrain Workers' Union is a trade union in Bahrain. It is affiliated with the World Federation of Trade Unions, but the International Centre for Trade Union Rights notes that the union does not appear to have any real presence in the country.
