= Forum for the Future (Bahrain 2005) =

The Forum for the Future in Bahrain on 11–12 November 2005 brought together, by suggestion of the prime minister of Spain, José Luis Rodríguez Zapatero, the leaders of states of the Middle East, industrialised countries of the Group of Eight (G8) and other partners to promote political, economic and social reform in the region. Delegates at the conference included US secretary of state, Condoleezza Rice, British foreign secretary Jack Straw, French foreign minister Philippe Douste-Blazy and Arab League Secretary General, Amr Moussa. The forum members discussed an agenda to promote the values of human dignity, democracy, economic opportunity, and social justice.

The forum also served as a venue for the region's businesses and civil society groups to express their goals and ideas for reform to their governments.

Speaking on 5 November, US State Department spokesman Sean McCormack previewed Ms Rice's agenda "In Bahrain, she will attend the Forum for the Future, part of our ongoing efforts to empower people in the region as they seek to reform and improve their lives and better their futures. A big part of the Forum for the Future is to serve as a mechanism to create a stable lasting mechanism where civil society groups from across the region can come together".

As the host the Kingdom of Bahrain co-chaired the forum with the current president of the G8, the United Kingdom. The forum focused on how information technology can promote political development and economic growth in the region.

The G8 Broader Middle East and North Africa Initiative (BMENA) was launched at the Sea Island Summit hosted by the United States in 2004. The Bahrain meeting was the second Forum for the Future after the first was convened in Rabat, Morocco on December 11, 2004.

== Participants ==
Bahrain, as forum host, invited the following participants:

BMENA region: Afghanistan, Algeria, Egypt, Iran, Iraq, Jordan, Kuwait, Lebanon, Libya, Mauritania, Morocco, Oman, Pakistan, Palestinian Authority, Qatar, Saudi Arabia, Syria, Tunisia, Turkey, United Arab Emirates, Yemen and Sudan.

G-8: Canada, France, Germany, Italy, Japan, Russia, United Kingdom and United States of America.

Partners: Spain and Denmark

Organisations: African Development Bank, Arab Fund for Economic and Social Development, Arab Monetary Fund, Asian Investment Bank, European Commission, European Council, European Investment Bank, Gulf Cooperation Council, International Finance Corporation, International Monetary Fund, Islamic Development Bank, Maghreb Arab Union, World Bank.

== See also ==
- Bahrain
- Politics of Bahrain
- Women's political rights in Bahrain
- Bahrain Centre for Human Rights
