= Boy Scouts of Bahrain =

National Scouting organization of Bahrain

- جمعية كشافة البحرين
- Country: Bahrain
- Founded: 1953; 73 years ago
- Membership: 3,270
- Affiliation: World Organization of the Scout Movement
- Website scoutbh.com

The Boy Scouts of Bahrain (Arabic: جمعية كشافة البحرين) is the national Scouting organization of Bahrain. It was founded in 1953, and became a member of the World Organization of the Scout Movement in 1970. The Boy Scouts of Bahrain has 3,270 members as of 2021.

The small Bahraini Scout organization often participates in cooperative events with neighboring Kuwait and Qatar. Scouts are involved in community service such as cleaning polluted areas and spraying insecticides, giving blood and helping to organize blood donor services, assistance at sports events and taking charge of first aid at schools.

historic membership badge of British Scout Groups which have existed since the 1930s in Bahrain

== Program and sections ==
- Al-Ashbal (Cub Scouts)-8 to 12
- Al-fetian (Boy Scouts)-12 to 14
- Al-Matakadem (Rovers)-14 to 18

There is also a section for handicapped Scouts.

The Scout Motto is Kun Musta'idan or كن مستعداً, translated as Be Prepared in Arabic. The noun for a single Scout is Kashaf or كشاف in Arabic.

== See also ==
- The Girl Guides Association of Bahrain
