= Al Meethaq =

Liberal political party in Bahrain

Al-Meethaq (Arabic: جمعية ميثاق العمل الوطني, romanized: Jamʿiyya Mīṯāq al-ʿAmal al-Waṭaniyy; lit. 'National Action Charter Society') is a liberal political party in Bahrain. It was founded by Sunni and Shi'a businessmen from well-known families in 2002.

It won no seats in the 2002 or 2006 general elections. Sixteen of its members were appointed by the King of Bahrain in 2002 to the wholly appointed Consultative Council of Bahrain which co-legislates with the elected Council of Representatives of Bahrain.

With other liberal groups, al-Meethaq has established the Al-Muntada activist group which campaigns for personal freedoms.

The party's leader is Ahmad Juma, who is culture editor of the newspaper Al Ayam.

== Bahraini uprising ==
On 16 February 2011, the third day of the Bahraini uprising, al-Meethaq said that it was unconstitutional to ask for devolution of power and establishment of an elected government. "The repeated statements by Ali Salman, head of Al Wefaq, about devolution of power and an elected government are completely flawed", the party's statement said.

== See also ==
- List of political parties in Bahrain
