= Economists Bloc =

The Economists Bloc (Arabic: كتلة الاقتصاديون) is a liberal political party in Bahrain which was represented by three MPs in the 2002-2006 parliament, but lost all its seats in the 2006 general election.

The party was the most consistent advocate of human rights, democratisation and free market economics in parliament. Because the main challenge to liberal values comes from Islamists, the party often found itself in a de facto alliance with the former communists of the Democratic Bloc (another party that lost all its seats in the 2006 election).

While generally supportive of the government, it has not been uncritically so. The party campaigned for compensation for victims of past human rights abuses, with the party's President Jassim Abdula'al MP forwarding a motion to parliamentary speaker, Khalifa Al Dhahrani. Abdula'al said that the national interest required closing the human rights file for good, between the leadership, the government and those affected.

Another prominent member is lawyer Fareed Ghazi MP, who is also an activist with the Al Muntada liberal think tank. Fareed Ghazi has urged liberals against imposing their will on a conservative public, adding that it was not the right approach politically and morally. "We should find a common ground with the conservative element rather than just sit on a high horse and tell them that our way is the right way," he said.

== See also ==
- List of political parties in Bahrain
