= We Have a Right =

We Have A Right (Arabic: لنا الحق, romanized: Lana alhaqu) is a political campaign launched to protect personal freedoms in Bahrain by the society of liberal intellectuals, Al Muntada, on 22 November 2005.

The aim of the We Have A Right campaign is to counter the threat to civil liberties posed by religious extremist parties that dominate the political space opened up by the extensive reforms of King Hamad bin Isa Al Khalifa since 1999. Both Sunni and Shia Islamist parties have used their new freedom to operate to try to curtail individual rights by seeking to pass legislation to force gender segregation at the University of Bahrain, ban consumption of alcohol and introduce Sharia Law.

According to an Al Muntada spokesman, We Have A Right was launched "to decry threats to Bahrain's civil society and individual freedom by waves of extremism, fanaticism, intolerance and intellectual terrorism." Adel Fakhro, the chairman of the Al Muntada, said at the first meeting: “What we fear is that the Bahraini citizen would lose his right to live in peace in a tolerant society in which every individual would respect the other.”

Bahraini liberals have argued that the principle of respect for personal freedoms is a guarantee of social stability, a favourable business environment, employment opportunities as well as protection from fanaticism.

The liberal societies behind We Have A Right have been criticised for their failure to gain the support of left wing parties, National Democratic Action and Nationalist Democratic Rally Society; both parties support the objectives but have felt that Al Muntada was too close to the government. Opponents of the campaign have suggested that it is mainly concerned with the right to consume alcohol and sought to portray it as ‘unIslamic’, dubbing it 'We have a right...to drink alcohol'.
