= General Federation of Workers Trade Unions in Bahrain =

Bahraini trade union federation

GFWTUB
- General Federation of Workers Trade Unions in Bahrain
- الاتحاد العام لنقابات عمال البحرين
- Founded: 2002
- Location: Bahrain
- Affiliations: International Trade Union Confederation
- Website: www.gfbtu.org/main

The General Federation of Workers Trade Unions in Bahrain(Formerly known as the General Committee for Bahrain Workers) (Arabic: الاتحاد العام لنقابات عمال البحرين) (GFWTUB) is a national trade union federation in Bahrain. It was established in 2002, by the Workers Trade Union Law granting workers the right to organize collectively.

The General Federation of Workers Trade Unions in Bahrain represents 80 unions and 25,000 members. To date, there have been 57 trade unions in Bahrain, of which 6 are in the public sector.

It is an affiliate of both the International Trade Union Confederation and the International Confederation of Arab Trade Unions.

== History ==
The establishment of the Federation was part of a number of key labour reforms introduced under the Minister of Labour, Majeed Al Alawi.

The International Confederation of Free Trade Unions' Annual Survey 2005 highlighted: "Bahrain, a bright spot in an otherwise dismal landscape of persistent labour rights violations in the Middle East". According to the ICFTU:

Bahrain has set the standard for the Gulf region in terms of positive developments. The right to form trade unions has existed since 2002, although only one national trade union centre is recognised, and other rights are still limited. The General Federation of Bahrain Trade Unions held its founding congress in January 2004 and in December became the first organisation in the Gulf States to become a member of the ICFTU. It has been actively involved in tripartite discussions, including on labour legislation.

In October 2006, King Hamad signed a law banning the sacking of employees engaged in trade union activities. Under an amended law, the courts must reinstate a sacked worker and award them compensation if it is proved that they were sanctioned for such activities.

The King's move followed criticism by the ICTFU of the sacking in July 2005 of Gulf Air's trade union head shortly after his election.

In 2012, the General Secretary of the General Federation of Bahrain Trade Unions (GFBTU), Said S. Salman Jaddar Al Mahfoodh, received the 2012 George Meany-Lane Kirkland Human Rights Award on behalf of their respective labor movements. He released the following statement: “This award does not only belong to the GBFTU, but first and foremost, it belongs to the more than 4,000 Bahraini workers and unionists who have been suffering from unjust firings and the consequences of expressing their opinions. It also belongs to the Bahraini people, who are still struggling for freedom, democracy and social justice.”

== Split in the General Federation of Workers Trade Unions in Bahrain ==
In 2012, a split in the labor movement in Bahrain following civil unrest resulted in the establishment of the Bahrain Labour Union Free Federation. The president of the Bahrain Labour Union Free Federation criticized the GFWTUB for being too political and "not being related to labour anymore." However, this split was criticized by labour experts and trade unionists in the GFWTUB as a move to weaken the Bahraini labor movement, noting that several of the 12 unions representing workers at major companies in Bahrain have alleged ties to the royal family.

Newspapers reported employers punishing employees who sought to unionize at work under the GFBTU umbrella. Additionally, there were reports that some workers were pressured to form unions under the government-supervised federation.

In 2019, the Bahrain Labour Union Free Federation that seceded from the General Federation of Workers Trade Unions in Bahrain disunited after the withdrawal of four affiliated trade unions.

== Work on the protection of migrant workers ==
The General Federation of Bahrain Trade Unions has conducted a survey in 2020 to assess the impact of the COVID-19 pandemic on migrant workers in Bahrain.

The General Federation of Workers Trade Unions in Bahrain has signed a memorandum of understanding with the International Domestic Workers Federation (IDWF) in 2019.
