= The Girl Guides Association of Bahrain =

National Guiding organization of Bahrain

- Country: Bahrain
- Founded: 1970
- Membership: 1,556
- Affiliation: World Association of Girl Guides and Girl Scouts

The Girl Guides Association of Bahrain (Arabic: الإتحاد البحريني للفتيات المرشدات) (GGAB) is the national Guiding organization of Bahrain. Guiding was introduced to Bahrain in 1970 and the association became a member of the World Association of Girl Guides and Girl Scouts (WAGGGS) in 1981. The girls-only organization has 1,556 members (as of 2003).

The Girl Guide emblem incorporates elements of the flag of Bahrain.

== Program ==
The association is divided into four sections:

- Brownie - ages 7 to 11
- Guides - ages 12 to 15
- Senior Guides - ages 16 to 18
- Ranger Guides - ages 18 to 23

== See also ==
- Boy Scouts of Bahrain
