= Nada Haffadh =

Bahraini politician

Nada Haffadh was Bahrain's first female cabinet minister when she was appointed Minister of Health in 2004, serving in the position until September 2007. Previously she served in Bahrain's upper house of parliament, the Consultative Council.

== Biography ==
Haffadh studied Medicine in Egypt and at the Royal College of Surgeons in Ireland before returning to Bahrain to practise, working for the Health Ministry both as a doctor and in administration. Haffadh was appointed to lead the Ministry after the previous incumbent failed to force through government reforms opposed by doctors.

Haffadh was replaced in a cabinet reshuffle in September 2007 as the government sought to placate critics in the Islamist-dominated parliament and removed ministers who had clashed with MPs. Haffadh had originally tendered her resignation in April 2007 following the formation of a parliamentary commission to investigate the work of the Health Ministry. The commission (members of which included Mohammed Khalid and Jassim Al Saeedi) was given impetus after an audit of Bahrain's health services by the Canadian Council for Health Accreditation found that some ministry staff were avoiding basic safety instructions. However, Haffadh received the backing of the Bahrain Medical Society, which opposed the parliamentary investigation, and believed that it was politically motivated, with a BMS official saying: "The probe committee is not investigating the ministry's irregularities and shortcomings. Instead, it is targeting the minister. Her efforts to improve things are praiseworthy and any offence against her is unacceptable to us."

A member of Bahrain's Shia sect, she has been an active campaigner for women's rights with Bahrain's Supreme Council for Women.
