= 2011 Bahrain Grand Prix =

Cancelled round of the 2011 Formula One season

Race details
- Date: Planned for 13 March 2011
- Official name: 2011 Formula 1 Gulf Air Bahrain Grand Prix
- Location: Bahrain International Circuit, Sakhir, Bahrain
- Course: Permanent racing facility
- Course length: 5.412 km (3.37 miles)
- Scheduled distance: 57 laps, 308.238 km (191.530 miles)

The 2011 Bahrain Grand Prix (officially the 2011 Formula 1 Gulf Air Bahrain Grand Prix) was scheduled to be the opening round of the 2011 Formula One World Championship. Planned to be held on 13 March 2011 at the Bahrain International Circuit in Sakhir, Bahrain, it was postponed on 21 February 2011 due to civil unrest. On 3 June, it was announced that the race would be held on 30 October, which would have made it the 17th of 20 Grands Prix held during 2011. Following controversy over the reinstatement of the race, organisers of the Grand Prix abandoned their bid to host a race in 2011.

== Postponement ==
On 14 February 2011 (later to be known as the Day of Rage), civil unrest broke out in Bahrain as part of a series of protests across North Africa and the Middle East. As a result of the unrest, medical staff due to attend the practice session for that weekend's Bahrain GP2 Asia Series race were redeployed to hospitals in Manama, forcing the cancellation of the Thursday practice session. Later that day, it was announced that the whole weekend would be cancelled at the request of the local motoring federation.

Chief executive of the Bahrain International Circuit Prince Salman bin Hamad Al Khalifa, who was also the crown prince of Bahrain, stated that "[his] focus ... is on delivering another successful event in the form of the Bahrain Grand Prix." Bernie Ecclestone, CEO of Formula One Management and Formula One Administration, stated that he hoped that talks with Al Khalifa would ease his fears that the event might be cancelled. Vice President of the Bahrain Centre for Human Rights, Nabeel Rajab said that it would be hard to bring a quick end to the protests. Ecclestone stated that "If its [the protests] not quietened down by Wednesday [23 February], I think we will have to cancel probably." Protesters were quoted stating that "the only reason" the Crown Prince was willing to talk with the protestors was for the sake of holding the race.

On 21 February 2011, Prince Salman postponed the race due to the ongoing protests. A pre-season test scheduled at the Bahrain International Circuit from 3–6 March was also delayed and moved to the Circuit de Barcelona-Catalunya, in Spain. The organisers were later given until 1 May to decide whether they want to proceed with the race at a later date.

== Provisional reinstatement and cancellation ==
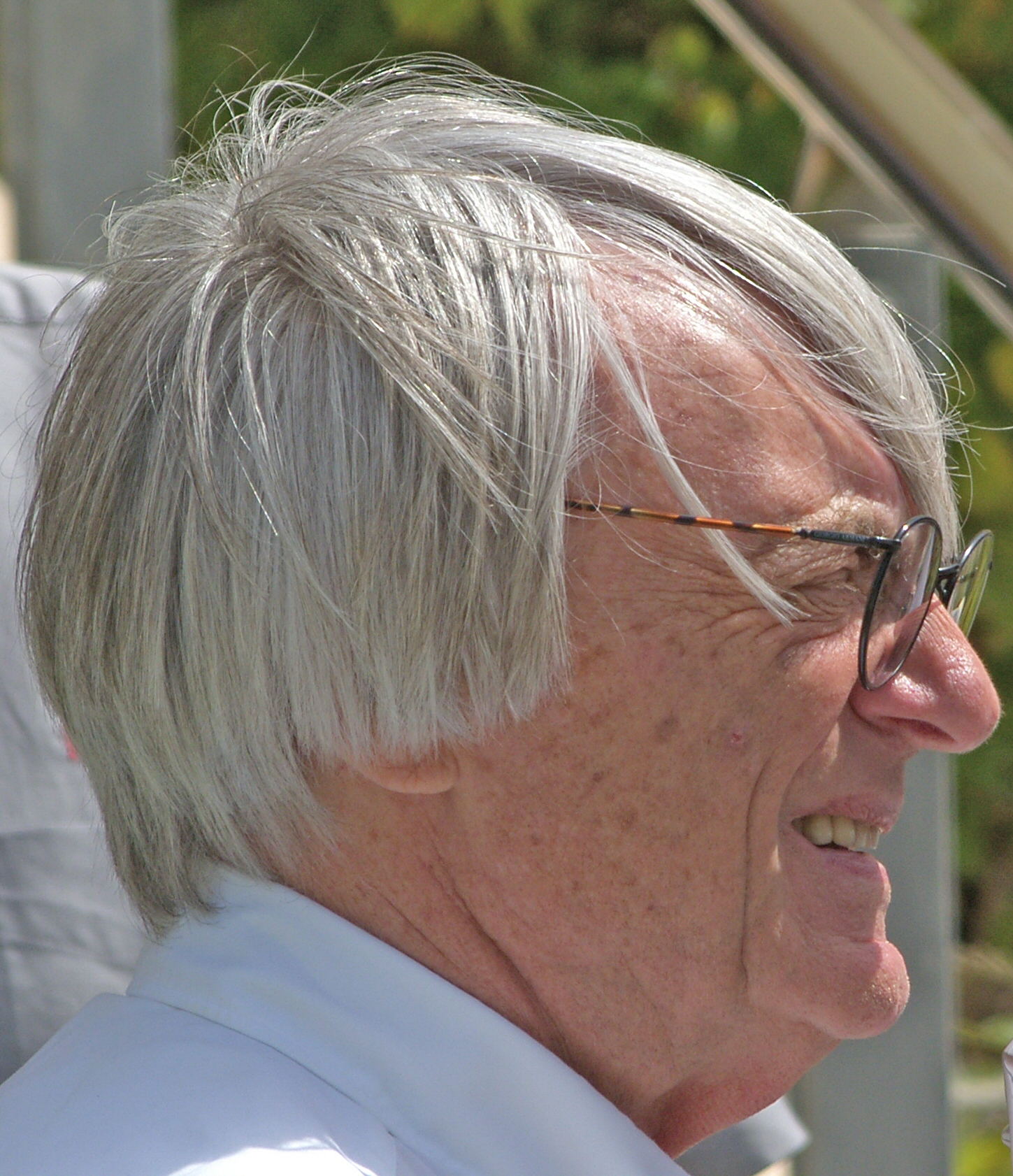
Bernie Ecclestone at the 2006 Bahrain Grand Prix

In April 2011, the race organisers released a statement stating that "normal life has returned to Bahrain" and that they were hopeful that they could host the race later in the year. On 2 May 2011, Bernie Ecclestone extended the deadline on rescheduling the race to 3 June.

At a meeting of the World Motor Sport Council (WMSC) on 3 June, FIA members unanimously voted to reinstate the Bahrain Grand Prix to the calendar on the planned date of 30 October, with the Indian Grand Prix moved from that date to 11 December. The decision was controversial, with Mercedes team principal Ross Brawn stating that a December finale was unacceptable, while human rights interest groups and activists criticised the FIA for the reinstatement in light of the ongoing political upheaval in the country. Red Bull Racing driver Mark Webber expressed his concerns over the human rights conditions and stated that he would have hoped for the sport to have taken a firmer stance on the affair. Several other drivers expressed a willingness to race on the condition that their safety could be guaranteed amid reports that widespread protests were being planned for the day of the race.

A petition to boycott the race received 300,000 signatories. In response to this, FIA president Jean Todt promised that the sport's governing body would monitor the situation in Bahrain carefully, leaving open the possibility of a cancellation should the country deteriorate ahead of the race, while commercial rights holder Bernie Ecclestone called for a second vote to take place, restoring the Indian Grand Prix to its original October date and moving the Bahrain Grand Prix back to the season finale in December. According to former FIA president Max Mosley, the rescheduling of the race would require the unanimous agreement of the teams. It had been reported that the Formula One Teams Association (FOTA) was opposed to rescheduling the race to 30 October on logistical grounds, but were willing to discuss an end-of-season berth for the race instead.

On 8 June, Ecclestone stated that he felt the race would not go ahead because the FIA had overlooked article 66 of the Sporting Code, which states that "no amendments can be made to the arrangements for a championship after entries open without the agreement of all competitors." The FIA later asked Ecclestone to submit a new calendar proposal after they were informed by FOTA that holding the Bahrain Grand Prix on 30 October was "impractical". On 9 June, organisers for the Bahrain Grand Prix officially abandoned their bid to return to the calendar.

== See also ==
- 2012 Bahrain Grand Prix protests
- Background of the 2011 Bahraini uprising
- Bahrain Grand Prix
- Politics and sports
- Timeline of the 2011 Bahraini uprising
- 2026 Bahrain Grand Prix, whose original April date in Bahrain was called off due to the 2026 Iran war before the race was relocated to Malaysia

Previous race: N/A	FIA Formula One World Championship; 2011 season	Next race: N/A
Previous race: 2010 Bahrain Grand Prix	Bahrain Grand Prix	Next race: 2012 Bahrain Grand Prix
