= 2010 Bahrain Grand Prix =

Race 1 of 19 in the 2010 Formula One World Championship
← Previous race	Next race →

Race details
- Date: 14 March 2010
- Official name: 2010 Formula 1 Gulf Air Bahrain Grand Prix
- Location: Bahrain International Circuit; Sakhir, Bahrain
- Course: Permanent racing facility
- Course length: 6.299 km (3.914 miles)
- Distance: 49 laps, 308.405 km (191.634 miles)
- Weather: Sunny
- Attendance: 100,000 (Weekend)

Pole position
Driver	(Germany) Sebastian Vettel	Red Bull-Renault
- Time: 1:54.101

Fastest lap
Driver	(Spain) Fernando Alonso	Ferrari
- Time: 1:58.287 on lap 45 (lap record)

Podium
First	(Spain) Fernando Alonso	Ferrari
Second	(Brazil) Felipe Massa	Ferrari
Third	(United Kingdom) Lewis Hamilton	McLaren-Mercedes

The 2010 Bahrain Grand Prix (formally the 2010 Formula 1 Gulf Air Bahrain Grand Prix) was a Formula One motor race held on 14 March 2010 at the Bahrain International Circuit, Sakhir, Bahrain. It was the seventh Bahrain Grand Prix and the opening round of the 2010 Formula One season. It was the first time since 2006 that Bahrain had hosted the opening round and the race took place on a lengthened layout of the track.

The race was won by Fernando Alonso, his first as a Ferrari driver and his first F1 victory overall since the 2008 Japanese Grand Prix. His new teammate, Felipe Massa ensured a good start to the year for the team by finishing second. McLaren driver Lewis Hamilton completed the podium by finishing in third position.

All of the race had been led by polesitter and Red Bull driver Sebastian Vettel, until lap 34 when a power issue forced him to concede the lead to Alonso. This meant that he was eventually overtaken by Massa and Hamilton too, meaning that he finished in fourth place. Vettel's teammate, Mark Webber qualified sixth before finishing the race in eighth place. Michael Schumacher's first race of his return to Formula One for the Mercedes team resulted in him finishing sixth, one place behind teammate Nico Rosberg. Reigning world champion Jenson Button completed his first race for the McLaren team by finishing seventh. It was also the Grand Prix debut of Nico Hülkenberg, who finished fourteenth for his team Williams.

The three new teams—Lotus, Hispania and Virgin—did not have a very successful debut race. Their six cars occupied the last six places in qualifying, and only one, the Lotus of Heikki Kovalainen, finished the race, although Jarno Trulli's Lotus was also classified in last place. As a consequence of the race, Fernando Alonso and Ferrari led their respective championships with maximum points. The race was also the first since the 1993 Australian Grand Prix not to feature refuelling during in-race pit stops, the first Grand Prix weekend since the 1997 Australian Grand Prix to have 24 initial entries and the first Grand Prix to have more than 22 starting drivers since the 1995 Japanese Grand Prix. The extended 'Endurance Layout' of the Bahrain International Circuit proved unpopular with drivers and teams and as of 2025 has never been used by the series again.

== Report ==
=== Background ===
The race saw the debut of three new teams: Hispania, Virgin and the new Malaysian-owned Lotus (not a direct descendant to Team Lotus, even though it is part owned by the same company which at present owns Lotus Cars), as well as the return of Mercedes after Daimler AG's take over of Brawn GP after the end of the 2009 season, and of Sauber, having competed as BMW the previous year. New drivers Nico Hülkenberg, Karun Chandhok, Bruno Senna, Lucas di Grassi and Vitaly Petrov also take part in their maiden races. Hülkenberg joined Williams, Petrov joined Renault and di Grassi became part of the Virgin team, while Hispania had an all-rookie line-up of Senna and Chandhok. Petrov became Russia's first ever Formula One World Championship driver; Chandhok became India's second following Narain Karthikeyan; Senna is a nephew of the legendary three-time Formula One world champion Ayrton Senna.

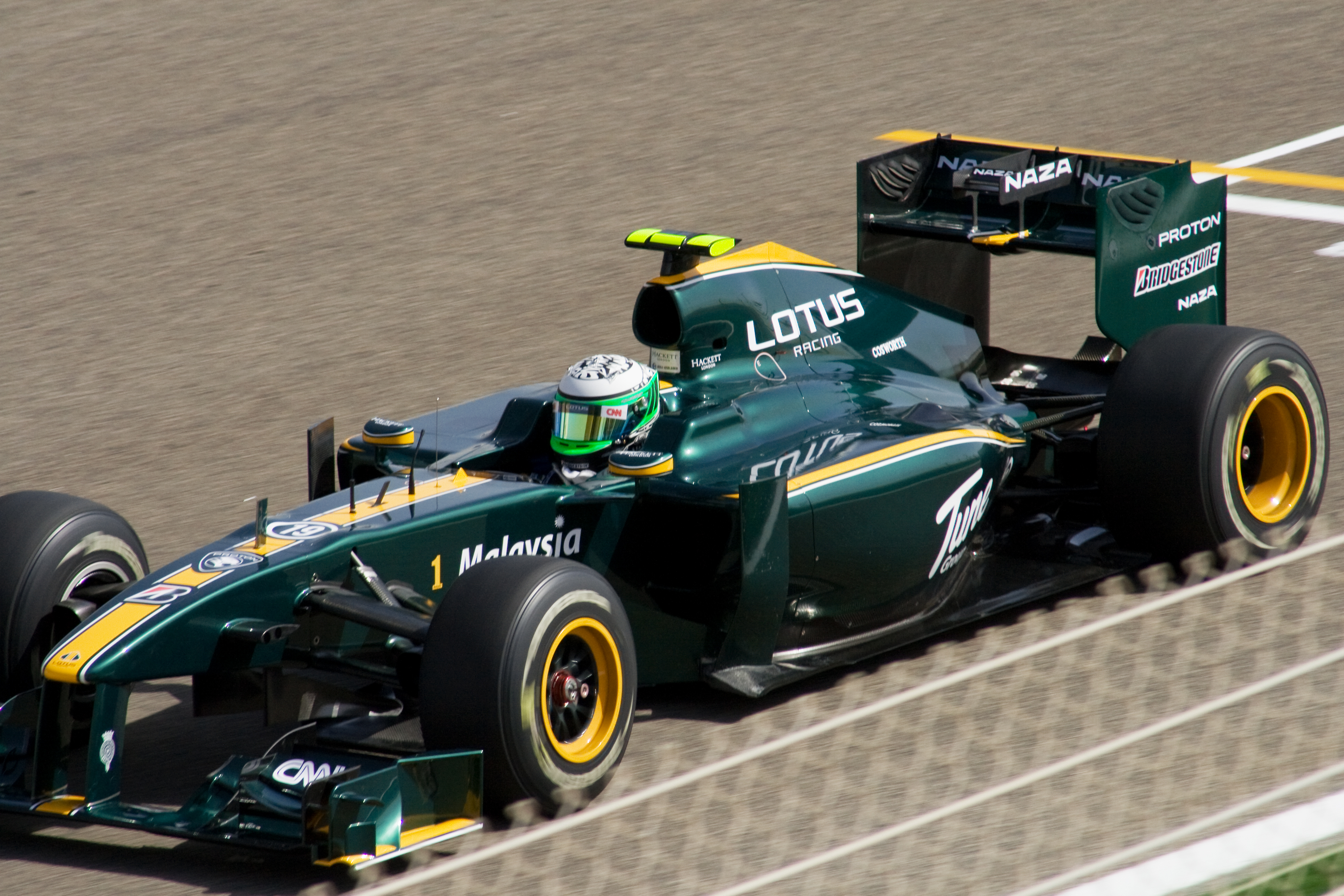
Lotus Racing was one of three new teams to debut in Bahrain.

2009 World Drivers' Champion Jenson Button made his debut for McLaren after changing teams from 2009 Constructors' Champion team Brawn in November 2009. Seven-time World Champion Michael Schumacher made his return to Formula One with Mercedes, Felipe Massa returned for Ferrari after his head injury at the 2009 Hungarian Grand Prix, and Timo Glock returned with the Virgin team following his accident at the 2009 Japanese Grand Prix.

All the previous winners of the event were present: Jenson Button won the 2009 Bahrain Grand Prix, with the Ferrari pair of Fernando Alonso and Felipe Massa both being two-time winners at this circuit. Schumacher won the first event in 2004.

The race also saw a return to the banning of refueling of the cars during the race, a practice which had been allowed since the 1994 Formula One season. Additionally a new points scoring system to decide the World Drivers' Championship was implemented, the most radical revamp of the system since the formation of the World Championship in 1950. The 10-8-6-5-4-3-2-1 system used from 2003 to 2009 was replaced by a new system which awards points to the top ten finishers on a 25-18-15-12-10-8-6-4-2-1 basis.

At 24 drivers and cars, this was the first time more than 22 cars had started Grand Prix since the 1995 Japanese Grand Prix (which also had 24 starters) and the largest event entry list since the 1997 Australian Grand Prix weekend where 24 cars were entered (but only 21 cars started that race).

The race was also the first to feature a revised stewards' panel under new FIA regulations, featuring a former Formula One driver. The driver in Bahrain was four-time World Champion Alain Prost.

=== Practice and qualifying ===
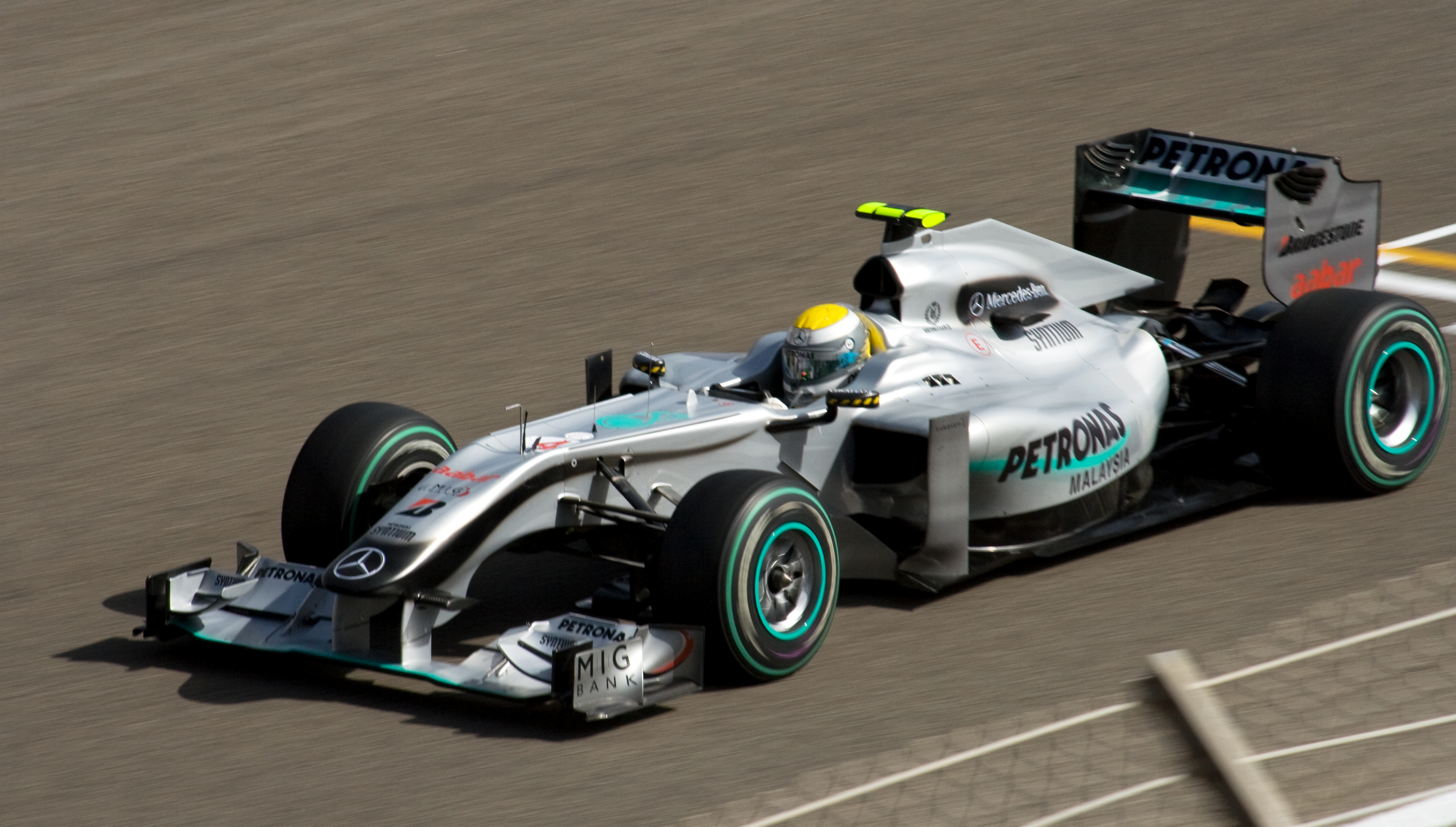
Nico Rosberg set the fastest time in the second free practice session for Mercedes.

Adrian Sutil set the fastest time for the Force India team in the first session of free practice on Friday morning. Fernando Alonso (Ferrari) was second, ahead of Robert Kubica (Renault), Felipe Massa in the other Ferrari, and the two McLaren drivers, Jenson Button and Lewis Hamilton. On his return to Formula One, Michael Schumacher set the tenth-fastest time for Mercedes, two positions behind teammate Nico Rosberg. Of the new teams, both Lotus drivers and Timo Glock set times, but Lucas di Grassi did not complete a full lap in the second Virgin car. The Hispania team was still completing its two chassis when the session started, but Bruno Senna was able to complete two installation laps before it ended.

In session 2 of free practice, Nico Rosberg set the fastest time, with Hamilton in second and Schumacher came third. Senna was struggling to match the pace of the fastest GP2 Asia Series drivers, but eventually did so, four seconds off the pace of the Virgins.

In the Saturday free practice session, Alonso in the Ferrari set the fastest time of 1:54.099, 0.269 seconds faster than Nico Rosberg in the Mercedes. Hispania's Karun Chandhok failed to participate in the practice session due to a hydraulic problem. Elsewhere, the Virgin of Glock lost its left-front wheel in the middle of the session, with the problem being attributed to an under-torqued airgun.

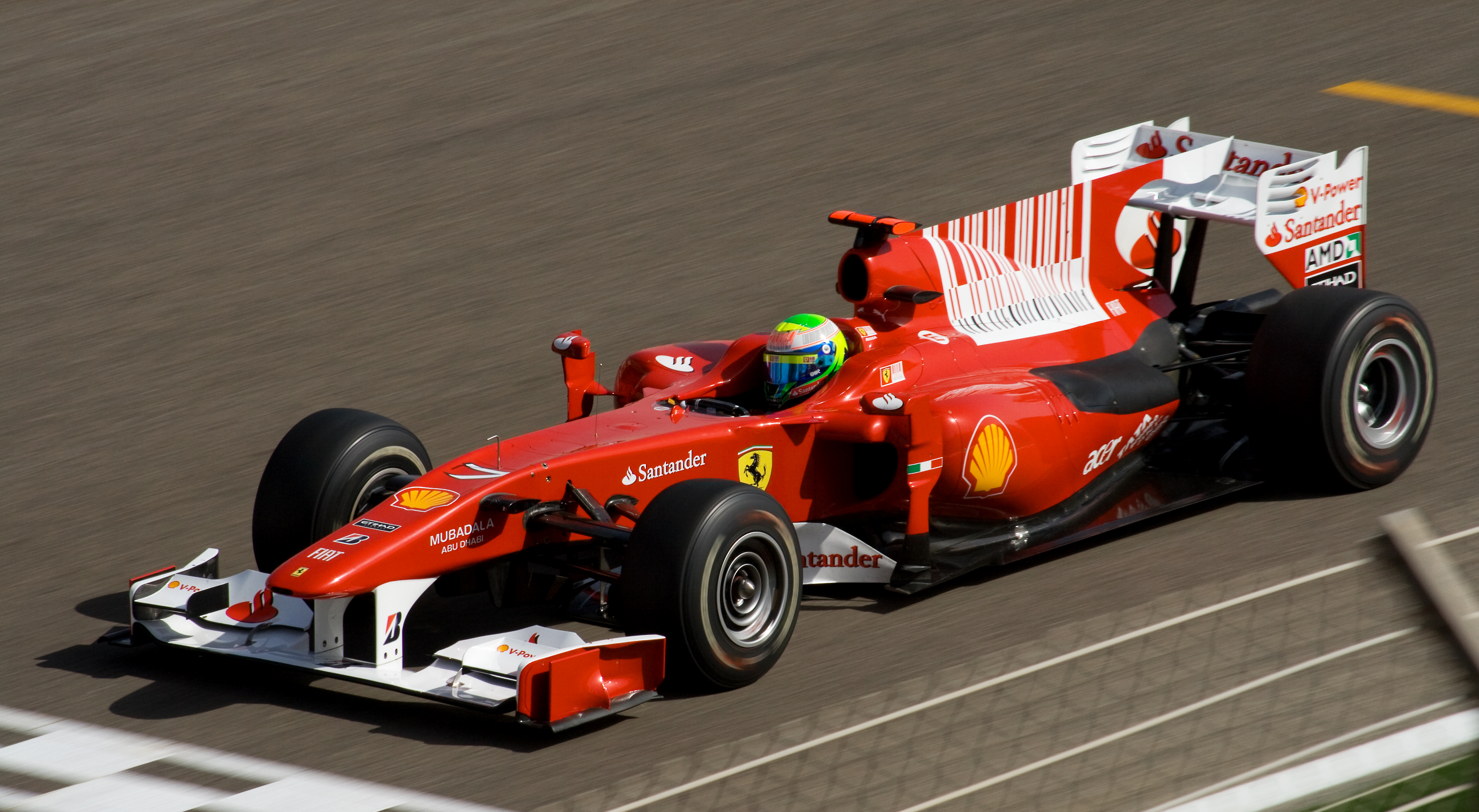
Felipe Massa qualified second for Ferrari, behind polesitter Sebastian Vettel.

The first qualifying session saw the six drivers from the three new teams eliminated, with Timo Glock – the fastest of the newcomers – 2.7 seconds adrift of Jaime Alguersuari in eighteenth and the only driver from the established teams to be eliminated. Despite a crippling hydraulics problem that saw him unable to take part in any of the free practice sessions, Hispania's Karun Chandhok was able to qualify in 24th and last place with a lap time ten seconds slower than the fastest driver, Ferrari's Fernando Alonso.

Reigning World Champion Jenson Button narrowly avoided elimination in the second qualifying period, pushing former Brawn GP teammate Rubens Barrichello out of the top ten and into elimination. Barrichello's Williams teammate Nico Hülkenberg was also eliminated, as were both Saubers of Pedro de la Rosa and Kamui Kobayashi, the second Toro Rosso of Sébastien Buemi, Force India's Vitantonio Liuzzi and rookie driver Vitaly Petrov in the Renault.

Red Bull's Sebastian Vettel took pole late in the third session, edging out the Ferraris of Massa and Alonso, with 2008 World Champion Lewis Hamilton in fourth. Mercedes's Nico Rosberg and seven-time World Champion Michael Schumacher were fifth and seventh respectively, with Sebastian Vettel's Red Bull teammate Mark Webber splitting them. Jenson Button could only manage eighth place, while ninth and tenth were taken by Robert Kubica and Adrian Sutil in the remaining Renault and Force India.

=== Race ===
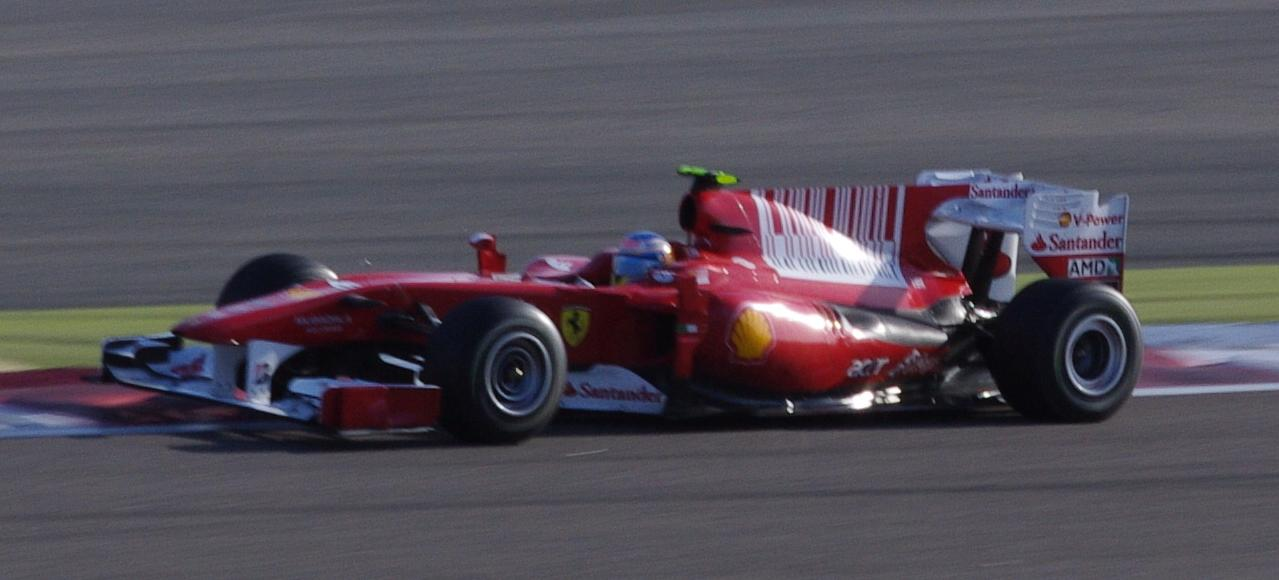
Fernando Alonso won on the occasion of his first race for the Ferrari team.

The first corner of the first lap saw Mark Webber's engine release copious amounts of oil smoke, triggering a sequence of events that saw Adrian Sutil and Robert Kubica spin around and fall to the back of the field. The first lap was otherwise clean, with Sebastian Vettel quickly converting his pole position into the race lead. Fernando Alonso got past teammate Felipe Massa, to get second, and both Mercedes drivers also gained a place, with Nico Rosberg fourth ahead of Lewis Hamilton, and Michael Schumacher beating Mark Webber to sixth spot. There was little position-changing otherwise, with Vitaly Petrov in the second Renault the biggest mover, up to eleventh from seventeenth on the grid.

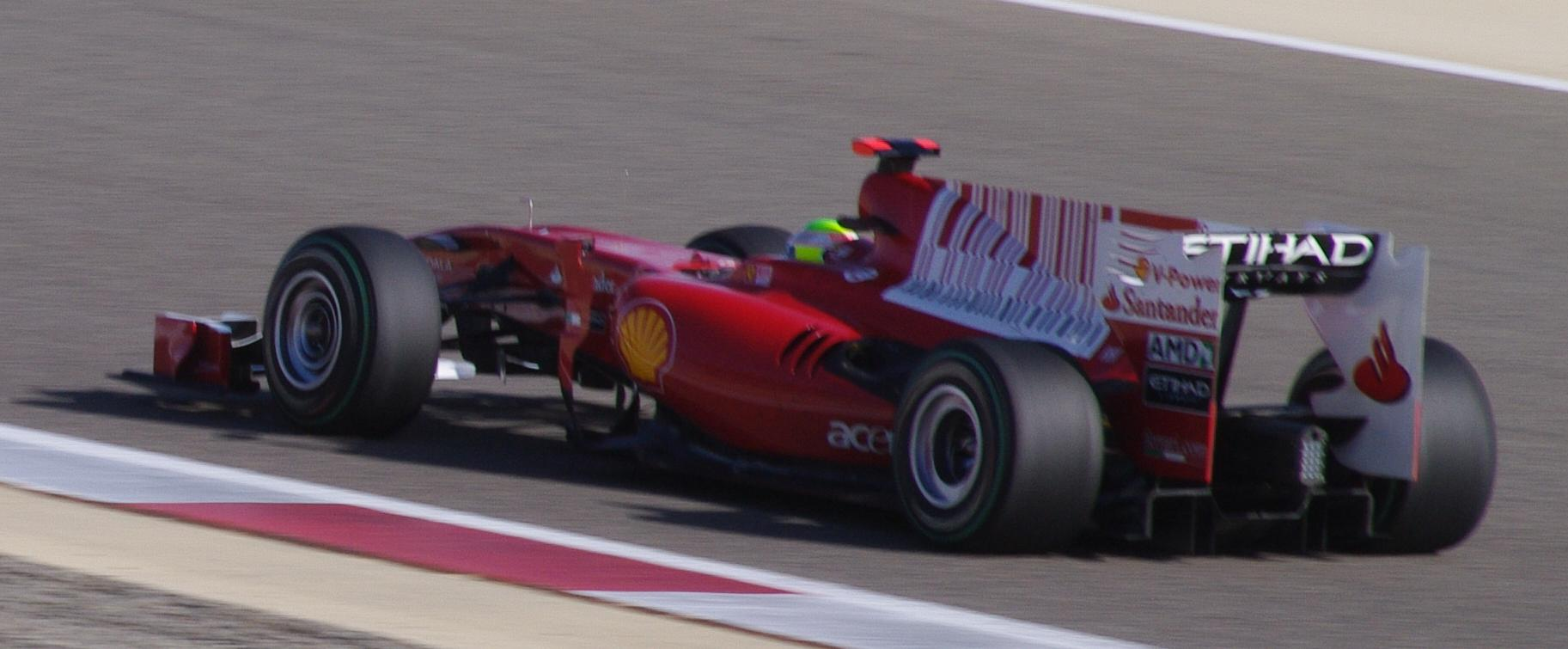
Massa, in his first race back after his accident in Hungary in 2009, finished second behind new teammate Alonso to score Ferrari their first 1-2 finish since the 2008 French Grand Prix.

It was a race of attrition, with the first major incident of the race being the retirement of Hispania's Karun Chandhok, who, after just a handful of laps in qualifying, hit a bump he did not know existed and retired with a damaged front wing. Virgin Racing's Lucas di Grassi joined him on the sidelines shortly thereafter when his Virgin VR-01's hydraulics — a chronic problem throughout the off-season — gave up. Fellow rookie Nico Hülkenberg was lucky to avoid a similar fate to Chandhok when he missed a corner on the run down to turn seventeen and skipped over the circuit. Sauber's Kamui Kobayashi fell victim to hydraulic failure, and was joined a lap later by Petrov who damaged his front-right suspension when he hit a kerb too hard; at the time of his retirement, Petrov had been the highest-placed rookie and had been racing Rubens Barrichello for tenth place and the final championship point on offer. Renault later clarified the issue as being an unanticipated mechanical fault on both cars that was traced back to Petrov's preference for a lower ride height than teammate Kubica who went unscathed. Timo Glock in the second Virgin also retired after losing third and fifth gears, while Bruno Senna's debut for Hispania ended when his engine overheated at the end of the main straight. The six drivers retired during the first seventeen laps. At the front, Vettel and the two Ferraris quickly pulled out a sizeable gap to the rest of the field.

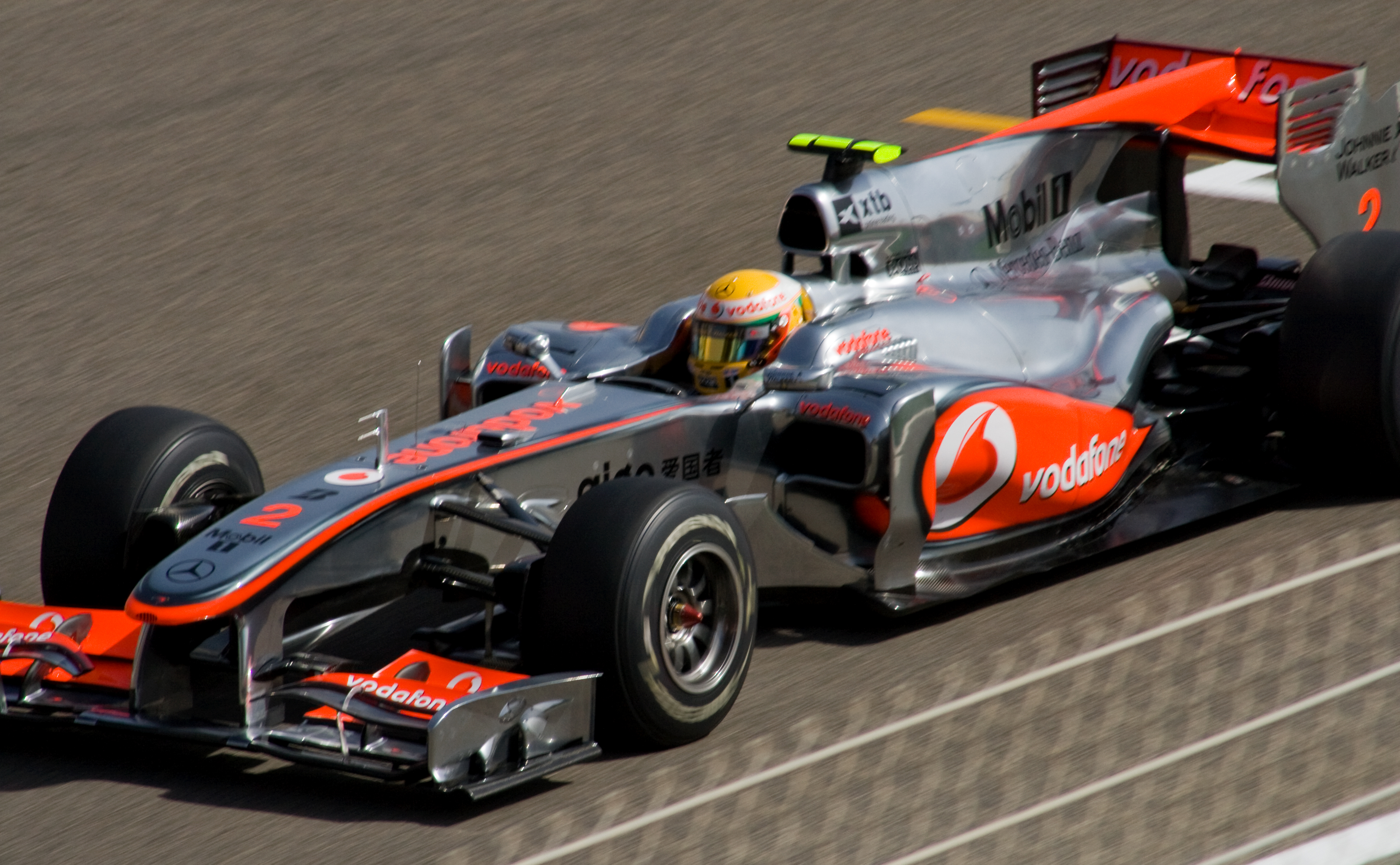
Lewis Hamilton finished behind the two Ferrari drivers in third position.

The first round of pit stops also proved to be the only round of stops, with Vettel stretching out enough of a lead to prevent the Ferraris from leap-frogging them. Elsewhere, good work from the McLaren crew allowed both their drivers to gain a place in the stops; Hamilton on Rosberg, and Jenson Button on Webber. The list of retirements grew on lap 23 when Pedro de la Rosa in the second BMW Sauber was also struck by a hydraulic issue.

Vettel continued to lead comfortably, two seconds ahead of Alonso and a further three ahead of Massa. However, he began to noticeably slow down during the latter part of the race due to a problem that was later identified within the team as a problem with a spark plug, and was quickly passed by the two Ferraris and Hamilton, and spent the rest of the race trying to hold Rosberg at bay. Alonso went on to win the race, joining Juan Manuel Fangio, Giancarlo Baghetti, Mario Andretti, Nigel Mansell and Kimi Räikkönen as the only men to win their first Grand Prix in a Ferrari. Massa finished second on his return to full-time racing after his injury at the 2009 Hungarian Grand Prix. Hamilton completed the podium, while Vettel successfully fended Rosberg off long enough to salvage fourth. Schumacher followed his teammate home for sixth, with Button seventh, Webber eighth, Vitantonio Liuzzi placing ninth and Barrichello claiming the final point on offer. Kubica recovered from his first-corner spin to claim eleventh while Sébastien Buemi and Jarno Trulli also retired; Buemi's Toro Rosso was struck by electrical issues, while Trulli added his name to the growing list of drivers taken down by hydraulics issues. As they each retired having completed 46 laps, they were classified as finishers as they completed ninety percent of the winner's race distance. Heikki Kovalainen finished fifteenth in the second Lotus, meaning that Lotus became the only entrant of the new teams to have a car finish the race.

=== Post-race ===
There was criticism after the race of the "new" Formula One, with it being echoed by Formula One personalities. McLaren team boss Martin Whitmarsh stated that the F1 community had to "work together to improve it." Former driver and BBC pundit David Coulthard said that two pitstops could be made mandatory as it "would also mean more potential for mistakes (and, by extension, spectator interest) in the pits." Coulthard was critical also of changes made by former FIA president Max Mosley, as the changes were made during his time in charge.

One person to disagree with the criticism, though, was Alain Prost, who said that "after a few races, I am sure the good drivers, the top drivers, will like it [the new format]."

The new section of the circuit used by Formula One for the first time also drew criticism from both drivers and fans alike, with most claiming the added corners offered little in the way of passing opportunities. For the next Bahrain Grand Prix in 2012, Formula One would revert to using the original Grand Prix Circuit.

== Classification ==
=== Qualifying ===
Pos	No	Driver	Constructor	Part 1	Part 2	Part 3	Grid
1	5	(Germany) Sebastian Vettel	Red Bull-Renault	1:55.029	1:53.883	1:54.101	1
2	7	(Brazil) Felipe Massa	Ferrari	1:55.313	1:54.331	1:54.242	2
3	8	(Spain) Fernando Alonso	Ferrari	1:54.612	1:54.172	1:54.608	3
4	2	(United Kingdom) Lewis Hamilton	McLaren-Mercedes	1:55.341	1:54.707	1:55.217	4
5	4	(Germany) Nico Rosberg	Mercedes	1:55.463	1:54.682	1:55.241	5
6	6	(Australia) Mark Webber	Red Bull-Renault	1:55.298	1:54.318	1:55.284	6
7	3	(Germany) Michael Schumacher	Mercedes	1:55.593	1:55.105	1:55.524	7
8	1	(United Kingdom) Jenson Button	McLaren-Mercedes	1:55.715	1:55.168	1:55.672	8
9	11	(Poland) Robert Kubica	Renault	1:55.511	1:54.963	1:55.885	9
10	14	(Germany) Adrian Sutil	Force India-Mercedes	1:55.213	1:54.996	1:56.309	10
11	9	(Brazil) Rubens Barrichello	Williams-Cosworth	1:55.969	1:55.330		11
12	15	(Italy) Vitantonio Liuzzi	Force India-Mercedes	1:55.628	1:55.623		12
13	10	(Germany) Nico Hülkenberg	Williams-Cosworth	1:56.375	1:55.857		13
14	22	(Spain) Pedro de la Rosa	BMW Sauber-Ferrari	1:56.428	1:56.237		14
15	16	(Switzerland) Sébastien Buemi	Toro Rosso-Ferrari	1:56.189	1:56.265		15
16	23	(Japan) Kamui Kobayashi	BMW Sauber-Ferrari	1:56.541	1:56.270		16
17	12	(Russia) Vitaly Petrov	Renault	1:56.167	1:56.619		17
18	17	(Spain) Jaime Alguersuari	Toro Rosso-Ferrari	1:57.071			18
19	24	(Germany) Timo Glock	Virgin-Cosworth	1:59.728			19
20	18	(Italy) Jarno Trulli	Lotus-Cosworth	1:59.852			20
21	19	(Finland) Heikki Kovalainen	Lotus-Cosworth	2:00.313			21
22	25	(Brazil) Lucas di Grassi	Virgin-Cosworth	2:00.587			22
23	21	(Brazil) Bruno Senna	HRT-Cosworth	2:03.240			PL
24	20	(India) Karun Chandhok	HRT-Cosworth	2:04.904			PL

=== Race ===
Pos	No	Driver	Constructor	Laps	Time/Retired	Grid	Points
1	8	(Spain) Fernando Alonso	Ferrari	49	1:39:20.396	3	25
2	7	(Brazil) Felipe Massa	Ferrari	49	+16.099	2	18
3	2	(United Kingdom) Lewis Hamilton	McLaren-Mercedes	49	+23.182	4	15
4	5	(Germany) Sebastian Vettel	Red Bull-Renault	49	+38.799	1	12
5	4	(Germany) Nico Rosberg	Mercedes	49	+40.213	5	10
6	3	(Germany) Michael Schumacher	Mercedes	49	+44.163	7	8
7	1	(United Kingdom) Jenson Button	McLaren-Mercedes	49	+45.280	8	6
8	6	(Australia) Mark Webber	Red Bull-Renault	49	+46.360	6	4
9	15	(Italy) Vitantonio Liuzzi	Force India-Mercedes	49	+53.008	12	2
10	9	(Brazil) Rubens Barrichello	Williams-Cosworth	49	+1:02.489	11	1
11	11	(Poland) Robert Kubica	Renault	49	+1:09.093	9	
12	14	(Germany) Adrian Sutil	Force India-Mercedes	49	+1:22.958	10	
13	17	(Spain) Jaime Alguersuari	Toro Rosso-Ferrari	49	+1:32.656	18	
14	10	(Germany) Nico Hülkenberg	Williams-Cosworth	48	+1 Lap	13	
15	19	(Finland) Heikki Kovalainen	Lotus-Cosworth	47	+2 Laps	21	
16^{1}	16	(Switzerland) Sébastien Buemi	Toro Rosso-Ferrari	46	Electrical	15	
17^{1}	18	(Italy) Jarno Trulli	Lotus-Cosworth	46	Hydraulics	20	
Ret	22	(Spain) Pedro de la Rosa	BMW Sauber-Ferrari	28	Hydraulics	14	
Ret	21	(Brazil) Bruno Senna	HRT-Cosworth	17	Airbox	PL	
Ret	24	(Germany) Timo Glock	Virgin-Cosworth	16	Gearbox	19	
Ret	12	(Russia) Vitaly Petrov	Renault	13	Suspension	17	
Ret	23	(Japan) Kamui Kobayashi	BMW Sauber-Ferrari	11	Hydraulics	16	
Ret	25	(Brazil) Lucas di Grassi	Virgin-Cosworth	2	Hydraulics	22	
Ret	20	(India) Karun Chandhok	HRT-Cosworth	1	Accident/Spun off	PL	

Notes:

1. – Both Sébastien Buemi and Jarno Trulli were classified as they had completed 90% of the winner's race distance.

== Championship standings after the race ==
Drivers' Championship standings

Pos	Driver	Points
1	(Spain) Fernando Alonso	25
2	(Brazil) Felipe Massa	18
3	(United Kingdom) Lewis Hamilton	15
4	(Germany) Sebastian Vettel	12
5	(Germany) Nico Rosberg	10

Constructors' Championship standings

Pos	Constructor	Points
1	(Italy) Ferrari	43
2	(United Kingdom) McLaren-Mercedes	21
3	(Germany) Mercedes	18
4	(Austria) Red Bull-Renault	16
5	Force India-Mercedes	2

- Note: Only the top five positions are included for both sets of standings.

== See also ==
- 2010 Bahrain International Circuit GP2 Asia Series round (March)

Previous race: 2009 Abu Dhabi Grand Prix	FIA Formula One World Championship; 2010 season	Next race: 2010 Australian Grand Prix
Previous race: 2009 Bahrain Grand Prix	Bahrain Grand Prix	Next race: 2012 Bahrain Grand Prix; 2011 edition cancelled
