= Bahrain Grand Prix =

Motorsport event

- Sepang International Circuit (2026)

Race information
- Number of times held: 22
- First held: 2004
- Most wins (drivers): (United Kingdom) Lewis Hamilton (5)
- Most wins (constructors): (Italy) Ferrari (7)
- Circuit length: 5.543 km (3.444 miles)
- Race length: 310.417 km (192.884 miles)
- Laps: 56

Last race (2026)

Pole position
- (Netherlands) Max Verstappen; Red Bull Racing-Red Bull Ford; 1:35.130

Podium
- 1. (Netherlands) M. Verstappen; Red Bull Racing-Red Bull Ford; 1:47:14.808; 2. (Italy) K. Antonelli; Mercedes; +2.307; 3. (United Kingdom) L. Hamilton; Ferrari; +4.919

Fastest lap
- (Netherlands) Max Verstappen; Red Bull Racing-Red Bull Ford; 1:38.220

The Bahrain Grand Prix (Arabic: جائزة البحرين الكبرى), officially known as the Gulf Air Bahrain Grand Prix for sponsorship reasons and ran as the Gulf Air Bahrain Grand Prix in Malaysia in 2026, is a Formula One motor racing event held in Bahrain. The inaugural race took place at the Bahrain International Circuit on 4 April 2004, and was initially held as a daytime race. The 2026 race was held at Sepang International Circuit in Malaysia.

The event has variously been the second, third, or fourth round of the F1 calendar. In 2006, it replaced the Australian Grand Prix as the season opener, as the latter was delayed to avoid clashing with the Commonwealth Games. Bahrain held the opening race in 2010 as well, when the longer 6.299 km (3.914 mi) “Endurance Circuit” was used to mark Formula One’s diamond jubilee. In 2021, the Grand Prix opened the season once more after the cancellation of the 2021 Australian Grand Prix due to the COVID-19 pandemic. In 2025, however, the Australian Grand Prix reclaimed the opening slot as part of Formula One’s regionalisation strategy, and Bahrain was scheduled as the fourth race of the season. Bahrain was set to remain in that slot for 2026, but was postponed and instead held in October. Bahrain is set to return as an opening race for 2027.

It was the first Formula One Grand Prix held in the Middle East and was awarded the FIA’s prize for “Best Organised Grand Prix”. In 2014, to commemorate the tenth anniversary of the event, the Bahrain Grand Prix was held under floodlights at night. It became F1’s second night race, after the Singapore Grand Prix’s debut in 2008. Lewis Hamilton won the inaugural night edition, and the race has remained a night event ever since.

The Bahrain Grand Prix has been widely criticised by human rights groups, who labeled it as an example of sportswashing, and has been affected by nearby conflicts. The 2011 Bahrain Grand Prix, scheduled for 13 March, was cancelled on 21 February amid widespread protests during the 2011 Bahraini uprising. Drivers, including former World Champion Damon Hill and Mark Webber, voiced opposition to the race. In 2012, human rights activists again called for cancellation of the race over reports of abuses by the authorities. Despite safety concerns raised by team personnel, the race went ahead on 22 April. The 2026 Bahrain Grand Prix was also originally cancelled, one month before it was due to take place, due to risks imposed by the 2026 Iran war. In July 2026, it was reinstated and relocated to the Sepang International Circuit in Malaysia in the opening weekend of October.

== History ==
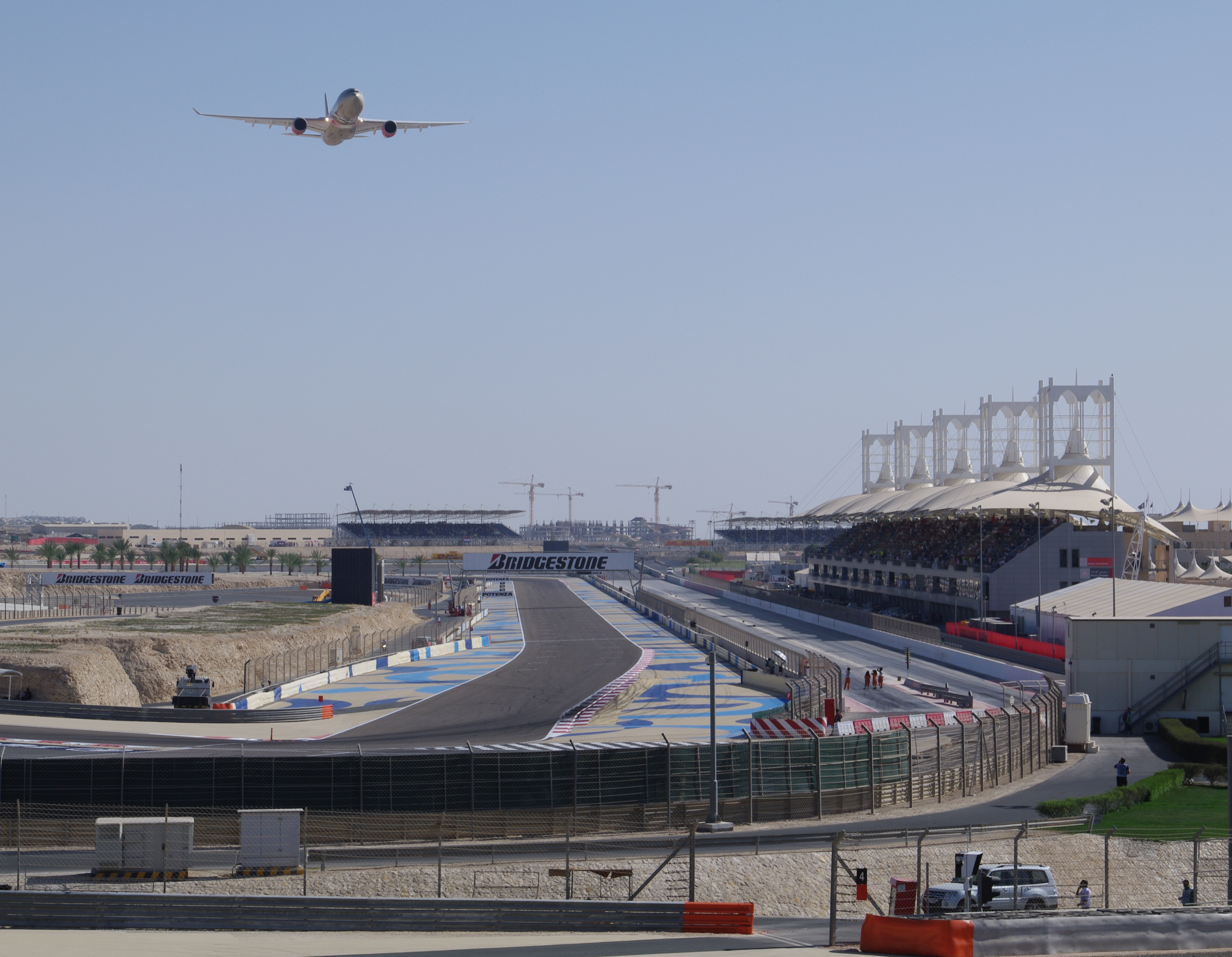
The Bahrain International Circuit in 2010

Construction of the Bahrain International Circuit at Sakhir began in 2002. Bahrain secured the rights to host Formula One after competing against Egypt, Lebanon, and the United Arab Emirates, all of which had also bid to host a race.

Endurance circuit, used in 2010

In 2010, the race utilized the extended “Endurance Circuit” layout, which increased the lap length to 6.299 km (3.914 mi). Plans to revert to the original “Grand Prix Circuit” layout were confirmed for the later-cancelled 2011 Bahrain Grand Prix, and it has been used since the event returned in 2012.

=== 2011 cancellation ===
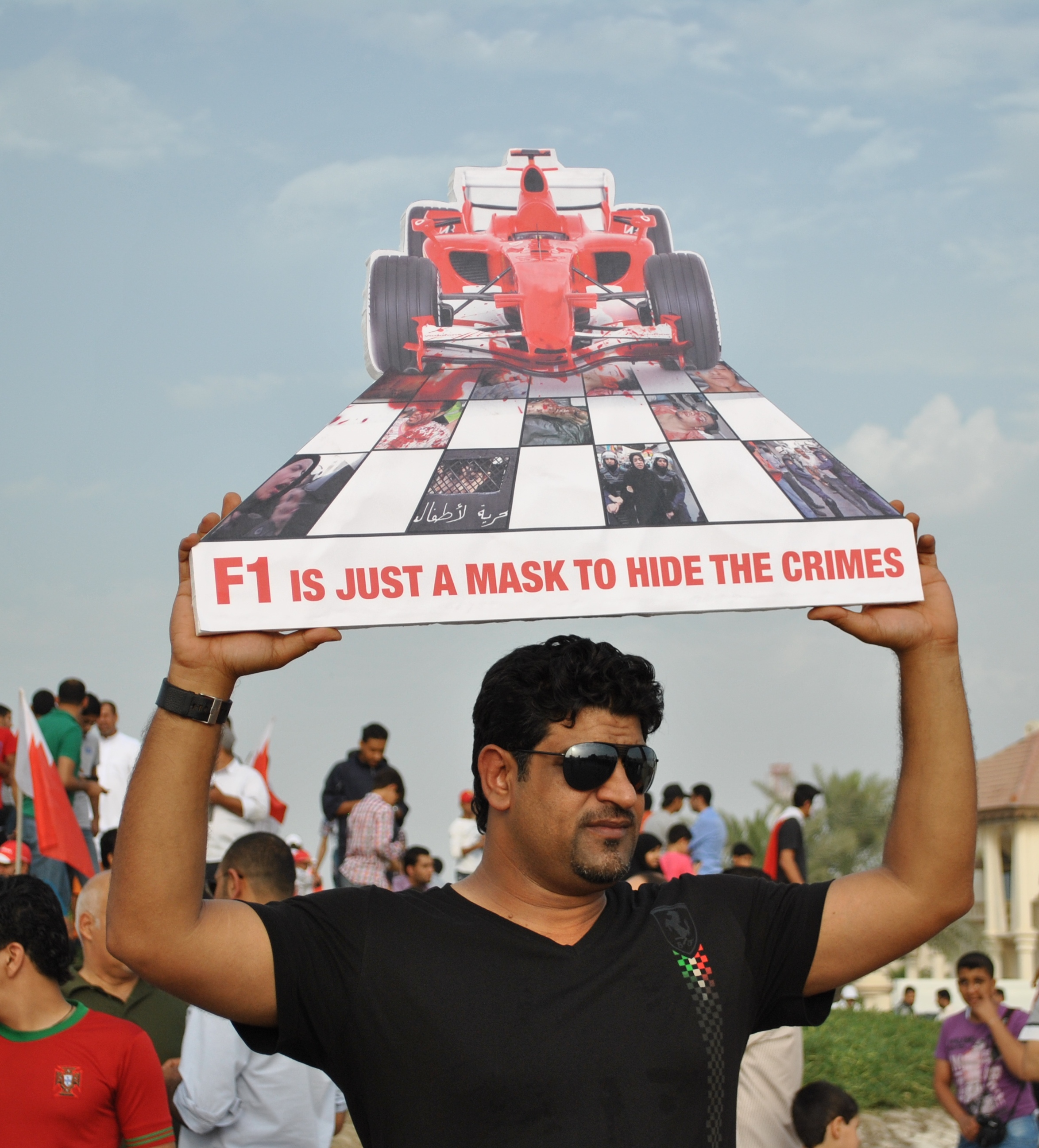
A demonstrator protesting against the race

On 21 February 2011, it was announced that the Bahrain Grand Prix scheduled for 13 March was cancelled due to the 2011 Bahraini protests. On 3 June, the FIA rescheduled the race for 30 October. The former world champion Damon Hill urged Formula One not to reinstate the event, warning that if it went ahead, “we will forever have the blight of association with repressive methods to achieve order”. Bernie Ecclestone told the BBC, “Hopefully there’ll be peace and quiet, and we can return in the future, but of course it’s not on. The schedule cannot be rescheduled without the agreement of the participants – they’re the facts”. A week after announcing the rescheduling, Formula One cancelled the race altogether.

=== 2020 postponement ===
In response to the COVID-19 pandemic, organisers announced that no spectators would be permitted at the race scheduled for 22 March 2020. Two weeks before the event, it was indefinitely postponed. It was later rescheduled for 29 November and became one of two races hosted at the Bahrain International Circuit across consecutive weekends, with the second race held on the outer layout and named the Sakhir Grand Prix.

In February 2022, the Bahrain Grand Prix contract was extended through to 2036.

=== 2026 postponement and relocation to Malaysia ===
The 2026 Bahrain Grand Prix was originally cancelled due to the 2026 Iran war, which rendered Bahrain and the neighbouring Saudi Arabia unsafe to host Formula One Grands Prix. As both races were held early in the season, replacement Grands Prix could not be scheduled at that time.

By July, arrangements were made with the Malaysian Ministry of Youth and Sports to host the Bahrain Grand Prix at the Sepang International Circuit, which formerly hosted the Malaysian Grand Prix between 1999 and 2017, in a slot following the Azerbaijan Grand Prix and before the Singapore Grand Prix. The event was run under the name Gulf Air Bahrain Grand Prix in Malaysia as the Bahraini government remains the primary financial promoter.

== Characteristics ==
The Bahrain International Circuit is known for its large run-off areas. While these have been criticised for failing to penalise mistakes, they help prevent sand from blowing onto the track. The circuit is widely regarded as one of the safest in Formula One.

Although alcohol is legal in Bahrain, podium celebrations use a non-alcoholic rosewater drink called Waard instead of champagne.

== Controversies ==
Since the global media attention in 2011 and 2012, human rights groups have continued to report abuses and arrests linked to F1 protests. Photographer Ahmed Humaidan was among about 30 people jailed for roles in the 2012 demonstrations, while activist Najah Ahmed Yousif was imprisoned and physically and sexually abused after criticising the Bahrain Grand Prix on social media. Rights organisations have criticised Formula One Group and Fédération Internationale de l'Automobile for failing to uphold their own Statement of Commitment to Respect for Human Rights, arguing that by ignoring political crackdowns, F1 is complicit in the suffering of dissidents. In 2018, after sustained pressure, F1 said it was “concerned” for Yousif, but there has been no known follow-up.

A coalition of human rights groups, led by the Bahrain Institute for Rights and Democracy, claims that the Bahrain Grand Prix has become a focal point for protests and abuse committed by security forces. They also accuse F1 of providing invaluable PR for Bahrain’s government and of helping normalise human rights violations. In letters to Lewis Hamilton, three political prisoners praised his stance on human rights and urged him to raise awareness of their plight. The event has been widely cited as an example of sportswashing.

Human rights activists called for the cancellation of the 2012 Bahrain Grand Prix, held on 22 April, citing ongoing excessive force by authorities and reports of torture in detention. The activist Salah Abbas Habib was killed during a demonstration on the eve of the Grand Prix, and the photojournalist Ahmed Ismael Hassan al-Samadi was fatally shot while covering an anti-Grand Prix protest.

On 9 April 2012, The Guardian reported that a senior team member, speaking anonymously, said his view was representative, “The Formula One teams want the sport’s governing body to cancel – or at least postpone – the Bahrain Grand Prix … I feel very uncomfortable about going to Bahrain. If I’m brutally frank, the only way they can pull this race off without incident is to have a complete military lockdown there. And I think that would be unacceptable, both for F1 and for Bahrain. But I don’t see any other way they can do it”.

On 21 April 2012, the group Anonymous launched “Operation Bahrain,” threatening cyberattacks if the race continued. Hours later, hackers took down the website f1-racers.net with a distributed denial-of-service attack. Despite the protests, the Grand Prix was held as scheduled.

Bahrain hosted two races in November 2020, but the decision drew criticism from human rights groups and from seven-time world champion Lewis Hamilton. Hamilton urged F1 to “face its responsibilities” and address human rights issues in host countries. A consortium of organisations led by the Bahrain Institute for Rights and Democracy wrote to the F1 CEO Chase Carey, warning that the race had again become a focal point for protests and abuses by Bahraini security forces. The Bahraini government denied allegations of sportswashing.

On 27 October 2022, F1 was served with a legal complaint from the Bahrain Institute for Rights and Democracy and two Bahraini torture survivors, Najah Yusuf and Hajer Mansoor, alleging it ignored human rights violations when it announced in February that the Bahrain Grand Prix would remain on the calendar until 2036. The claim, filed through the UK National Contact Point (NCP), accused them of breaching guidelines set by the Organisation for Economic Co-operation and Development.

== Winners ==
=== By year ===
Year	Driver	Constructor	Circuit	Report
2004	(Germany) Michael Schumacher	Ferrari	Sakhir	Report
2005	(Spain) Fernando Alonso	Renault	Sakhir	Report
2006	(Spain) Fernando Alonso	Renault	Sakhir	Report
2007	(Brazil) Felipe Massa	Ferrari	Sakhir	Report
2008	(Brazil) Felipe Massa	Ferrari	Sakhir	Report
2009	(United Kingdom) Jenson Button	Brawn-Mercedes	Sakhir	Report
2010	(Spain) Fernando Alonso	Ferrari	Sakhir	Report
2011	Cancelled due to the 2011 Bahraini uprising			Report
2012	(Germany) Sebastian Vettel	Red Bull-Renault	Sakhir	Report
2013	(Germany) Sebastian Vettel	Red Bull-Renault	Sakhir	Report
2014	(United Kingdom) Lewis Hamilton	Mercedes	Sakhir	Report
2015	(United Kingdom) Lewis Hamilton	Mercedes	Sakhir	Report
2016	(Germany) Nico Rosberg	Mercedes	Sakhir	Report
2017	(Germany) Sebastian Vettel	Ferrari	Sakhir	Report
2018	(Germany) Sebastian Vettel	Ferrari	Sakhir	Report
2019	(United Kingdom) Lewis Hamilton	Mercedes	Sakhir	Report
2020	(United Kingdom) Lewis Hamilton	Mercedes	Sakhir	Report
2021	(United Kingdom) Lewis Hamilton	Mercedes	Sakhir	Report
2022	(Monaco) Charles Leclerc	Ferrari	Sakhir	Report
2023	(Netherlands) Max Verstappen	Red Bull-Honda RBPT	Sakhir	Report
2024	(Netherlands) Max Verstappen	Red Bull-Honda RBPT	Sakhir	Report
2025	(Australia) Oscar Piastri	McLaren-Mercedes	Sakhir	Report
2026	(Netherlands) Max Verstappen	Red Bull-Red Bull Ford	Sepang	Report

=== Repeat winners (drivers) ===
Drivers in bold are competing in the Formula One championship in 2026.

Wins	Driver	Years won
5	(United Kingdom) **Lewis Hamilton**	2014, 2015, 2019, 2020, 2021
4	(Germany) Sebastian Vettel	2012, 2013, 2017, 2018
3	(Spain) **Fernando Alonso**	2005, 2006, 2010
3	(Netherlands) **Max Verstappen**	2023, 2024, 2026
2	(Brazil) Felipe Massa	2007, 2008

=== Repeat winners (constructors) ===
Teams in bold are competing in the Formula One championship in 2026.

Wins	Constructor	Years won
7	(Italy) **Ferrari**	2004, 2007, 2008, 2010, 2017, 2018, 2022
6	(Germany) **Mercedes**	2014, 2015, 2016, 2019, 2020, 2021
5	(Austria) **Red Bull**	2012, 2013, 2023, 2024, 2026
2	(France) Renault	2005, 2006

=== Repeat winners (engine manufacturers) ===
Manufacturers in bold are competing in the Formula One championship in 2026.

Wins	Manufacturer	Years won
8	(Germany) **Mercedes**	2009, 2014, 2015, 2016, 2019, 2020, 2021, 2025
7	(Italy) **Ferrari**	2004, 2007, 2008, 2010, 2017, 2018, 2022
4	(France) Renault	2005, 2006, 2012, 2013
2	(Japan) Honda RBPT	2023, 2024

== Track layouts ==
Sakhir Grand Prix Circuit (2004)

Sakhir Grand Prix Circuit (2005–2009, 2012–2025)

Sakhir Endurance Circuit (2010)

Sepang International Circuit (2026)

== See also ==
- 2020 Sakhir Grand Prix, which was ran on the Outer Circuit configuration
- Tourism in Bahrain
