= 2019 Bahrain Grand Prix =

Second round of the 2019 Formula One season

Race 2 of 21 in the 2019 Formula One World Championship
← Previous race	Next race →

Race details
- Date: 31 March 2019
- Official name: Formula 1 Gulf Air Bahrain Grand Prix 2019
- Location: Bahrain International Circuit; Sakhir, Bahrain
- Course: Permanent racing facility
- Course length: 5.412 km (3.362 miles)
- Distance: 57 laps, 308.238 km (191.530 miles)
- Weather: Clear
- Attendance: 97,000

Pole position
Driver	(Monaco) Charles Leclerc	Ferrari
- Time: 1:27.866

Fastest lap
Driver	(Monaco) Charles Leclerc	Ferrari
- Time: 1:33.411 on lap 38

Podium
First	(United Kingdom) Lewis Hamilton	Mercedes
Second	(Finland) Valtteri Bottas	Mercedes
Third	(Monaco) Charles Leclerc	Ferrari

The 2019 Bahrain Grand Prix (officially known as the Formula 1 Gulf Air Bahrain Grand Prix 2019) was a Formula One motor race that took place on 31 March 2019 at the Bahrain International Circuit in Sakhir, Bahrain. The race was the second round of the 2019 FIA Formula One World Championship and marked the 15th time that the Bahrain Grand Prix had been run as a round of the Formula One World Championship.

== Background ==
=== Championship standings before the race ===
Heading into the Grand Prix, Valtteri Bottas led the World Drivers' Championship by 8 points over teammate Lewis Hamilton. Their team, Mercedes, was holding a 22-point lead over Ferrari in the World Constructors' Championships.

=== Entrants ===
The drivers and teams were the same as the season entry list with no additional stand in drivers for either the race or practice.

The main title sponsor of Ferrari, Mission Winnow, returned from this race, after it was not used by the Scuderia at the previous race in Australia for legal reasons.

=== DRS ===
Before the race, it was announced that an extra drag reduction system (DRS) zone would be added to the circuit. In addition to the DRS zones between turns 15 and 1 and between turns 10 and 11 an extra DRS zone was added between turns 3 and 4. This change was expected to increase the number of overtakes and promote more pit stops during the race.

== Free practice ==
The first practice session happened without major incident and ended with a Ferrari one-two with Charles Leclerc leading Sebastian Vettel with Leclerc comfortably beating the next fastest constructor by nearly one second. The second and third practice sessions also ended with a comfortable Ferrari one-two although it was Leclerc who was leading Vettel in third practice.

== Qualifying ==
Charles Leclerc got his first pole position of his Formula 1 career in the 2019 Bahrain Grand Prix Weekend with his Ferrari teammate Sebastian Vettel in second with a time 0.3 seconds slower. After Ferrari looked substantially ahead of Mercedes in free practice, Mercedes did manage to close the gap to the Italian team, but still qualified on the second row for the race on Sunday, with Lewis Hamilton ahead of teammate Valtteri Bottas. Max Verstappen was 0.5 seconds adrift from Valtteri Bottas in 4th place with Kevin Magnussen only 0.005 seconds slower than the Dutchman. Carlos Sainz Jr. split the two Haas cars in 7th and Kimi Räikkönen continuing his longest streak of Q3's in Formula 1, qualifying ninth just ahead of Lando Norris’ McLaren in 10th.

Pierre Gasly missed out on Q3 once again in Bahrain in the Red Bull, qualifying 13th behind Daniel Ricciardo in 11th and Alexander Albon in 12th, Sergio Pérez qualified 14th, 0.3 seconds quicker than Daniil Kvyat in 15th in his Toro Rosso.

Nico Hülkenberg (Renault) was the shock exit in Q1 in 17th place behind Antonio Giovinazzi’s Alfa Romeo and ahead of Lance Stroll, who qualified 18th. Williams once again qualify on the back row, the lead Williams George Russell 1.5 seconds away from Stroll and Robert Kubica qualified in last place with a 1:31.799 compared to the fastest time of 1:28.495.

=== Qualifying classification ===
Pos.	No.	Driver	Constructor	Qualifying times			Final grid
Pos.	No.	Driver	Constructor	Q1	Q2	Q3	Final grid
1	16	(Monaco) Charles Leclerc	Ferrari	1:28.495	1:28.046	1:27.866	1
2	5	(Germany) Sebastian Vettel	Ferrari	1:28.733	1:28.356	1:28.160	2
3	44	(United Kingdom) Lewis Hamilton	Mercedes	1:29.262	1:28.578	1:28.190	3
4	77	(Finland) Valtteri Bottas	Mercedes	1:29.498	1:28.830	1:28.256	4
5	33	(Netherlands) Max Verstappen	Red Bull Racing-Honda	1:29.579	1:29.109	1:28.752	5
6	20	(Denmark) Kevin Magnussen	Haas-Ferrari	1:29.532	1:29.017	1:28.757	6
7	55	(Spain) Carlos Sainz Jr.	McLaren-Renault	1:29.528	1:29.055	1:28.813	7
8	8	(France) Romain Grosjean	Haas-Ferrari	1:29.688	1:29.249	1:29.015	11^{1}
9	7	(Finland) Kimi Räikkönen	Alfa Romeo Racing-Ferrari	1:29.959	1:29.471	1:29.022	8
10	4	(United Kingdom) Lando Norris	McLaren-Renault	1:29.381	1:29.258	1:29.043	9
11	3	(Australia) Daniel Ricciardo	Renault	1:29.859	1:29.488	N/A	10
12	23	(Thailand) Alexander Albon	Scuderia Toro Rosso-Honda	1:29.514	1:29.513	N/A	12
13	10	(France) Pierre Gasly	Red Bull Racing-Honda	1:29.900	1:29.526	N/A	13
14	11	(Mexico) Sergio Pérez	Racing Point-BWT Mercedes	1:29.893	1:29.756	N/A	14
15	26	(Russia) Daniil Kvyat	Scuderia Toro Rosso-Honda	1:29.876	1:29.854	N/A	15
16	99	(Italy) Antonio Giovinazzi	Alfa Romeo Racing-Ferrari	1:30.026	N/A	N/A	16
17	27	(Germany) Nico Hülkenberg	Renault	1:30.034	N/A	N/A	17
18	18	(Canada) Lance Stroll	Racing Point-BWT Mercedes	1:30.217	N/A	N/A	18
19	63	(United Kingdom) George Russell	Williams-Mercedes	1:31.759	N/A	N/A	19
20	88	(Poland) Robert Kubica	Williams-Mercedes	1:31.799	N/A	N/A	20
107% time: 1:34.689

Notes

- ^1 – Romain Grosjean was given a three place grid penalty for impeding Lando Norris during qualifying.

== Race ==
Charles Leclerc started from pole position but lost two positions to his teammate Sebastian Vettel and the Mercedes of Valtteri Bottas, who managed to get ahead of his teammate Lewis Hamilton in the first corner. Romain Grosjean and Lance Stroll tangled on the first lap with Stroll hitting Grosjean, giving the Haas damage.

By the end of the first lap, Leclerc was on Bottas' tail and passed the Finn into turn 1 on lap 2, which also allowed Lewis Hamilton to take third place from Bottas. On lap 4, Carlos Sainz Jr. attacked Max Verstappen on the outside in turn 4 but the two collided, giving Sainz a puncture. On lap 6, Charles Leclerc overtook Vettel for the lead of the race into turn 1 and began to pull away quickly. Antonio Giovinazzi sent Daniil Kvyat into a spin at turn 11.

Hamilton was catching Vettel throughout the race and eventually caught up to him on lap 38, making a move around the outside at turn 4. Vettel went into a spin on corner exit, saying he got surprised and lost the rear of the car. In the process he flat-spotted his tires, causing severe vibration leading to a front wing failure. Pitting to replace the front wing dropped him to 9th place. The Renaults were running 6th and 7th and made contact while battling for position into turn 1, with Daniel Ricciardo left with front wing damage.

On lap 46, Leclerc was cruising in the lead but then reported an engine issue and slowed significantly, lapping several seconds slower than his immediate rivals, and getting unlapped by cars he previously lapped. It was later revealed that one of his engine cylinders had stopped working. On lap 48 he was caught by Hamilton, who took the lead. On lap 54 Leclerc was passed by Bottas, dropping him to 3rd with Verstappen closing rapidly. However, with four laps remaining, the two Renaults retired with mechanical issues and brought out the safety car, which stayed out until the end of the race. As a result, Leclerc managed to hold on to 3rd place and claimed his first ever podium in Formula 1, the first Formula One World Championship podium for a Monégasque driver since Louis Chiron finished third at the 1950 Monaco Grand Prix. Leclerc also had the fastest lap of the race, giving him and Ferrari one extra point for their respective championships.

=== Race classification ===
Pos.	No.	Driver	Constructor	Laps	Time/Retired	Grid	Points
1	44	(United Kingdom) Lewis Hamilton	Mercedes	57	1:34:21.295	3	25
2	77	(Finland) Valtteri Bottas	Mercedes	57	+2.980	4	18
3	16	(Monaco) Charles Leclerc	Ferrari	57	+6.131	1	16^{1}
4	33	(Netherlands) Max Verstappen	Red Bull Racing-Honda	57	+6.408	5	12
5	5	(Germany) Sebastian Vettel	Ferrari	57	+36.068	2	10
6	4	(United Kingdom) Lando Norris	McLaren-Renault	57	+45.754	9	8
7	7	(Finland) Kimi Räikkönen	Alfa Romeo Racing-Ferrari	57	+47.470	8	6
8	10	(France) Pierre Gasly	Red Bull Racing-Honda	57	+58.094	13	4
9	23	(Thailand) Alexander Albon	Scuderia Toro Rosso-Honda	57	+1:02.697	12	2
10	11	(Mexico) Sergio Pérez	Racing Point-BWT Mercedes	57	+1:03.696	14	1
11	99	(Italy) Antonio Giovinazzi	Alfa Romeo Racing-Ferrari	57	+1:04.599	16	
12	26	(Russia) Daniil Kvyat	Scuderia Toro Rosso-Honda	56	+1 lap	15	
13	20	(Denmark) Kevin Magnussen	Haas-Ferrari	56	+1 lap	6	
14	18	(Canada) Lance Stroll	Racing Point-BWT Mercedes	56	+1 lap	18	
15	63	(United Kingdom) George Russell	Williams-Mercedes	56	+1 lap	19	
16	88	(Poland) Robert Kubica	Williams-Mercedes	55	+2 laps	20	
17^{2}	27	(Germany) Nico Hülkenberg	Renault	53	Power unit	17	
18^{2}	3	(Australia) Daniel Ricciardo	Renault	53	Power loss	10	
19^{2}	55	(Spain) Carlos Sainz Jr.	McLaren-Renault	53	Gearbox	7	
Ret	8	(France) Romain Grosjean	Haas-Ferrari	16	Collision damage	11	
Fastest lap: (Monaco) Charles Leclerc (Ferrari) – 1:33.411 (lap 38)

Notes

- ^1 – Includes one point for the fastest lap.
- ^2 – Nico Hülkenberg, Daniel Ricciardo and Carlos Sainz Jr. were classified as they completed more than 90% race distance.

== Championship standings after the race ==
Drivers' Championship standings

	Pos.	Driver	Points
	1	(Finland) Valtteri Bottas	44
	2	(United Kingdom) Lewis Hamilton	43
	3	(Netherlands) Max Verstappen	27
1	4	(Monaco) Charles Leclerc	26
1	5	(Germany) Sebastian Vettel	22

Constructors' Championship standings

	Pos.	Constructor	Points
	1	(Germany) Mercedes	87
	2	(Italy) Ferrari	48
	3	(Austria) Red Bull Racing-Honda	31
2	4	(Switzerland) Alfa Romeo Racing-Ferrari	10
4	5	(United Kingdom) McLaren-Renault	8

- Note: Only the top five positions are included for both sets of standings.

== See also ==
- 2019 Sakhir Formula 2 round

Previous race: 2019 Australian Grand Prix	FIA Formula One World Championship; 2019 season	Next race: 2019 Chinese Grand Prix
Previous race: 2018 Bahrain Grand Prix	Bahrain Grand Prix	Next race: 2020 Bahrain Grand Prix
