= 2012 Bahrain Grand Prix =

Race 4 of 20 in the 2012 Formula One World Championship
← Previous race	Next race →

Race details
- Date: 22 April 2012
- Official name: 2012 Formula 1 Gulf Air Bahrain Grand Prix
- Location: Bahrain International Circuit; Sakhir, Bahrain
- Course: Permanent racing facility
- Course length: 5.412 km (3.363 miles)
- Distance: 57 laps, 308.238 km (191.530 miles)
- Weather: Sunny and hot Air Temp 27 °C (81 °F) Track Temp 33 °C (91 °F) dropping to 29 °C (84 °F)
- Attendance: 70,000 (Weekend)

Pole position
Driver	(Germany) Sebastian Vettel	Red Bull-Renault
- Time: 1:32.422

Fastest lap
Driver	(Germany) Sebastian Vettel	Red Bull-Renault
- Time: 1:36.379 on lap 41

Podium
First	(Germany) Sebastian Vettel	Red Bull-Renault
Second	(Finland) Kimi Räikkönen	Lotus-Renault
Third	(France) Romain Grosjean	Lotus-Renault

The 2012 Bahrain Grand Prix (formally known as the 2012 Formula 1 Gulf Air Bahrain Grand Prix) was a Formula One motor race held on 22 April 2012 at the Bahrain International Circuit in Sakhir, Bahrain. It was the first time Formula One returned to Bahrain after the 2011 race was cancelled due to ongoing anti-government protests. The race, the eighth running of the Bahrain Grand Prix, was contested over 57 laps and was the fourth round of the 2012 Formula One season.

Sebastian Vettel started the race from pole position, leading into the first corner and for the majority of the race en route to victory. He was not without pressure though, as the Lotus of Kimi Räikkönen climbed the field, having started in eleventh place, and challenged for the lead before finishing second. Räikkönen's teammate Romain Grosjean took the first podium finish of his career by finishing third, after having a strong start and quickly moving into second place by overtaking Lewis Hamilton and Mark Webber. Räikkönen passed Grosjean for second place roughly halfway through the race, being on a better tyre strategy. Hamilton started on the front row, but pitstop errors and degrading tyres left him eighth; his McLaren teammate, Jenson Button, retired with two laps remaining.

The decision to hold the race despite ongoing protests and violence has been described as "controversial" by Al Jazeera English, CNN, AFP and Sky News. The Independent named it "one of the most controversial in the history of the sport".

== Report ==
=== Background ===
After using the "endurance circuit" in 2010, the series reverted to using the "Grand Prix" configuration for the 2012 race.

As the 2011 race was cancelled, the teams arrived in Bahrain with no data on how the Pirelli tyres introduced for the 2011 season would behave at the Sakhir circuit. Furthermore, Pirelli revised their tyre compounds for the 2012 season, and with the races in Australia, Malaysia and China being run in cool or wet conditions, there was no data available on how the 2012-specification Pirelli tyres would performance in the hot and dry conditions expected in Bahrain. The teams were supplied with the medium and soft compounds, the same selection that had been provided at the previous race in Shanghai. Red Bull Racing driver Mark Webber predicted that the teams who understood the behaviour of the tyres first would be the most successful in the race. Mercedes driver Nico Rosberg – who won his first race in China one week prior to the race – supported this prediction, suggesting that understanding tyre behaviour would be a recurring theme throughout the season, and critical to the championship. Pirelli motorsport director Paul Hembery predicted that teams would experience a high rate of tyre degradation, and that sand on the circuit surface could cause graining on the tyres.

Similarly, the Drag Reduction System (DRS) was introduced for the 2011 season, and consequently had never been used at the Bahrain International Circuit in a race. Race officials elected to place it on the start-finish straight to allow for overtaking into the first corner complex. The DRS detection point was positioned 108 metres (354 ft) from the apex to Turn 14, with the activation point located 270 metres (890 ft) after the final corner, creating a DRS zone of 820 metres (0.51 mi).

Williams driver Pastor Maldonado was given a five-place grid penalty for a gearbox change when the team discovered an undiagnosed fault in his gearbox and they were forced to replace it. Under Formula One regulations, a gearbox must be used for five consecutive events (including the race, qualifying session and third practice session for each event). An unscheduled gearbox change results in an automatic five-place grid penalty, applied after the qualifying session. Maldonado became the fourth driver of the 2012 season to receive a gearbox penalty, after Sergio Pérez, Kimi Räikkönen and Lewis Hamilton all made similar changes in Australia, Malaysia and China.

Valtteri Bottas replaced Bruno Senna at Williams for the first practice session. It was Bottas' third session, of a scheduled fifteen, driving Senna's car. Bottas was the only reserve driver to take part in a practice session.

=== Free practice ===
The first ninety-minute practice session began with the drivers performing installation laps, returning to pit lane before setting a lap time so as to work on the car setup. The majority of drivers completed the session using the harder "prime" tyres, while several teams – including Ferrari and Lotus – used the session to test new aerodynamic configurations to their front and rear wings. The surface of the circuit was visibly sandy, owing to a lack of use in the two years prior to the event. Force India's Nico Hülkenberg was the first driver to record a lap time, twenty minutes into the session. Romain Grosjean moved to the top of the timing sheets as the majority of drivers began to emerge from the pit lane for timed runs, though the difference between Grosjean's time and Hülkenberg's was negligible. Kimi Räikkönen and Sebastian Vettel both improved upon the fastest times, but by the time every driver had recorded a timed lap, it was Lewis Hamilton who posted the fastest time. Hamilton's time of 1:33.572 went unchallenged for the remainder of the session. Vettel was second-fastest, three-tenths behind the McLaren driver, while Paul di Resta in the second Force India was third, having switched to the softer "option" tyres in the last ten minutes.

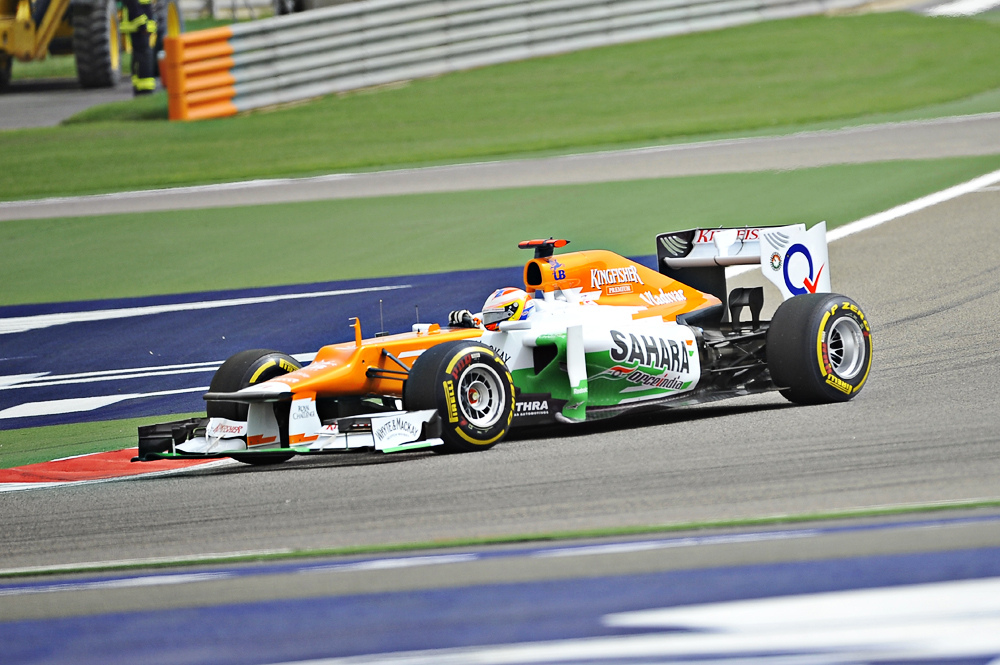
Force India chose not to take part in the second free practice session.

With Force India electing not to take part in the second session over security concerns, twenty-two cars took to the circuit for Friday's second ninety-minute practice session. A GP2 practice session between the first and second Formula One sessions meant that some of the sand on the surface of the circuit was cleaned up, and teams began their first runs on the softer option compound of tyres. Narain Karthikeyan was the first driver out, setting a lap time of 1:41.710 almost straight away. Several other drivers, including Jean-Éric Vergne, Vitaly Petrov, Pastor Maldonado, Timo Glock and Daniel Ricciardo also emerged, setting lap times within the first five minutes of the session starting. After the initial rush of the first fifteen minutes, Jenson Button emerged as the fastest man on the circuit before being surpassed by Mark Webber moments later. Michael Schumacher, Sebastian Vettel, Nico Rosberg all led the field by the halfway point, but it was Rosberg who led the way into the final ten minutes of the session when all twenty-two cars were out on the circuit together. Rosberg's time of 1:32.816 was enough to see him through to the end of the session in front, four-tenths of a second faster than Webber, with Vettel third. After finishing in front in the first session, Lewis Hamilton was fourth, while Bruno Senna – back in his car after being replaced by Bottas in the first session – ended the session in eighteenth, behind the Caterham of Heikki Kovalainen and narrowly ahead of Marussia driver Timo Glock.

The third and final practice session took place on Saturday morning, three hours before qualifying, and sixty minutes in length. A localised sandstorm nearby meant that the air around the circuit was dusty, but a westerly wind pushed the dusty cloud away from the circuit as the session wore on. Jean-Éric Vergne was the first driver to leave the pits, leading a group of fourteen, but they returned to the lane immediately; with the cars being switched to race specification the night before, further installation laps were needed. Paul di Resta was the first driver to record a lap time, a 1:41.356, set ten minutes into the session. He was followed closely by teammate Nico Hülkenberg, with both drivers following an extensive testing program, having missed the second free practice session; after one hour, they had completed forty-three laps between them. Nico Rosberg once again finished the session fastest with a time of 1:33.254. Vettel and Webber were second and third, with Hamilton fourth.

=== Qualifying ===
Formula One qualifying uses a three-stage "knockout" system. Qualifying takes place over the course of one hour, broken up into three periods known as Q1, Q2 and Q3. Q1 is twenty minutes long, and sees all twenty-four drivers take part. At the end of the twenty-minute session, the seven slowest drivers are eliminated, filling positions eighteen to twenty-four on the grid. After a short break, the drivers' times are reset and the second session – Q2 – begins. Q2 is fifteen minutes long, and is contested by the remaining seventeen drivers. After the fifteen-minute session has passed, the slowest seven drivers are once again eliminated, filling positions eleven to seventeen on the grid. This leaves the ten fastest drivers to contest the final qualifying period, Q3. Q3 is ten minutes long, and sets positions one through to ten on the grid. Drivers who contest Q3 must start the race on the set of tyres that they recorded their fastest lap time with. Drivers who are eliminated in Q1 and Q2 are free to start the race on any set of tyres they choose. Any relevant penalties from the previous race or current race weekend are applied after the completion of the three qualifying periods.

In order to take part in the race, a driver must set a time within 107% of the fastest lap time in Q1. For example, if the fastest time in Q1 is one minute, forty seconds, then a driver must set a time faster than one minute and forty-seven seconds to qualify for the race.

==== Q1 ====
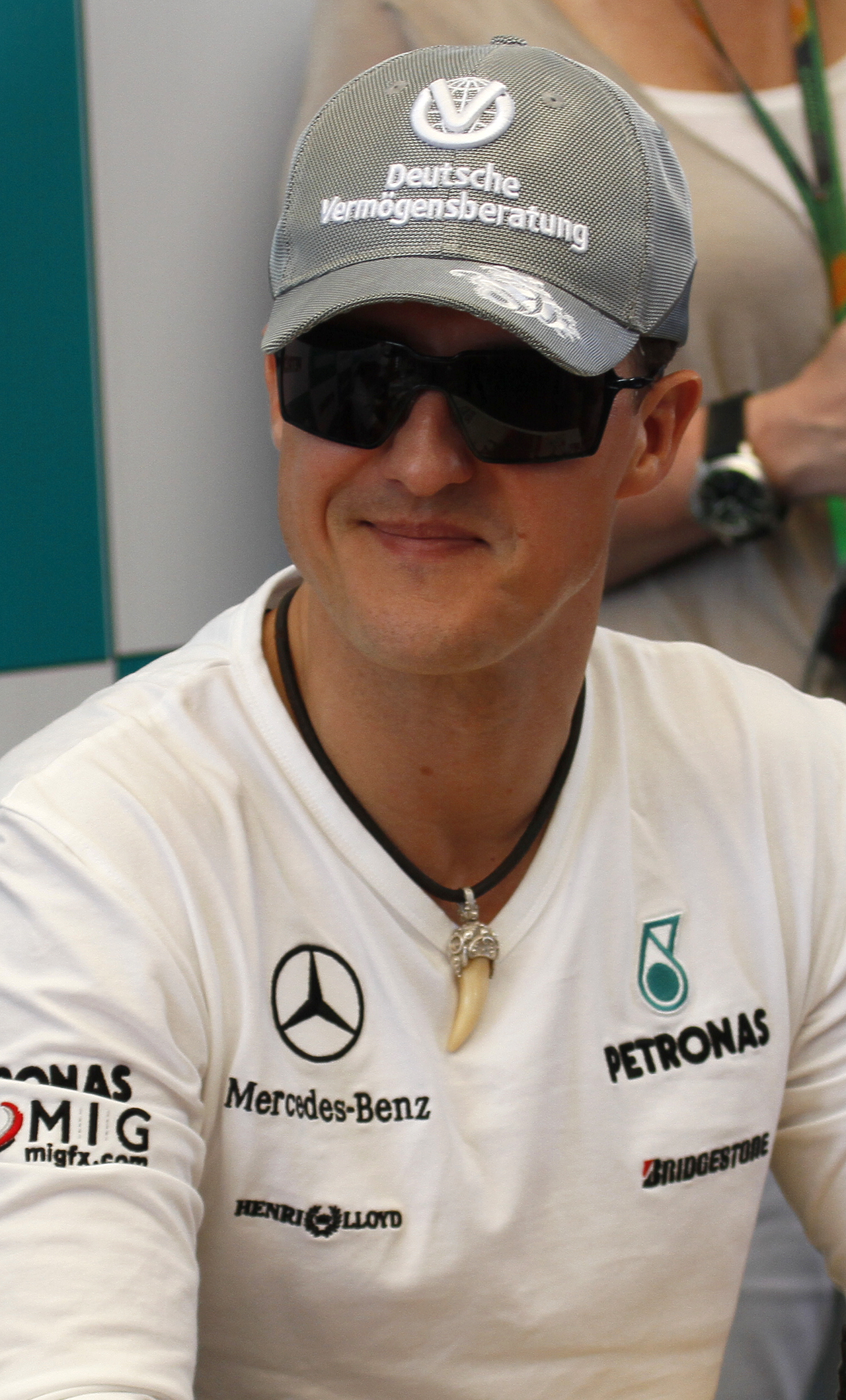
Michael Schumacher was eliminated at the end of Q1.

Qualifying started at 1400 local time, with the track surface measuring 43 °C (109 °F) and a headwind down the main straight.

The first period saw two distinct, informal phases. Most drivers recorded a "banker" lap on the harder prime tyres, so as to have a benchmark time to their name. Some drivers, most notably Fernando Alonso, chose to set their first lap on the softer option tyres so as to preserve an extra set of tyres for the race given the high rate of degradation. The session ran for the full twenty minutes without interruption, though Nico Rosberg ran wide at Turn 5 and passed through a gravel trap, while Kimi Räikkönen was observed violently hitting a kerb.

Toro Rosso driver Jean-Éric Vergne spent most of the period facing the threat of elimination, even though he was as high up the order as sixth at one point, after putting on the softer tyres. However, as the second phase of the session began, the drivers switched to the softer tyres and the order changed rapidly. Vergne fell back down the order and was ultimately eliminated. It was the third consecutive Grand Prix in which he was eliminated in Q1. He was later cited by the stewards for missing the weighbridge at the end of the qualifying period. Michael Schumacher was hampered by a problem with the DRS flap in his rear wing, and a late lap from Caterham's Heikki Kovalainen saw Schumacher eliminated and Kovalainen advance through to Q2. It was just the second time that Kovalainen and his team had qualified in Q2 while running in dry conditions (the other being the 2011 Spanish Grand Prix). Kovalainen's teammate, Vitaly Petrov, was eliminated after his final lap was not enough to replicate Kovalainen's feat.

Also eliminated were the Marussias for Timo Glock and Charles Pic. Pic finished twenty-first, out-qualifying teammate Glock for the first time in his career. Glock set an early time on the harder compound tyres, but a mistake on his flying lap with the softer compound meant that he qualified twenty-third of twenty-four cars. The HRTs of Pedro de la Rosa and Narain Karthikeyan finished in twenty-second and twenty-fourth; both were inside the 107% margin (1:40.380), but they were still four seconds off the pace of Sergio Pérez, the fastest man in Q1.

==== Q2 ====
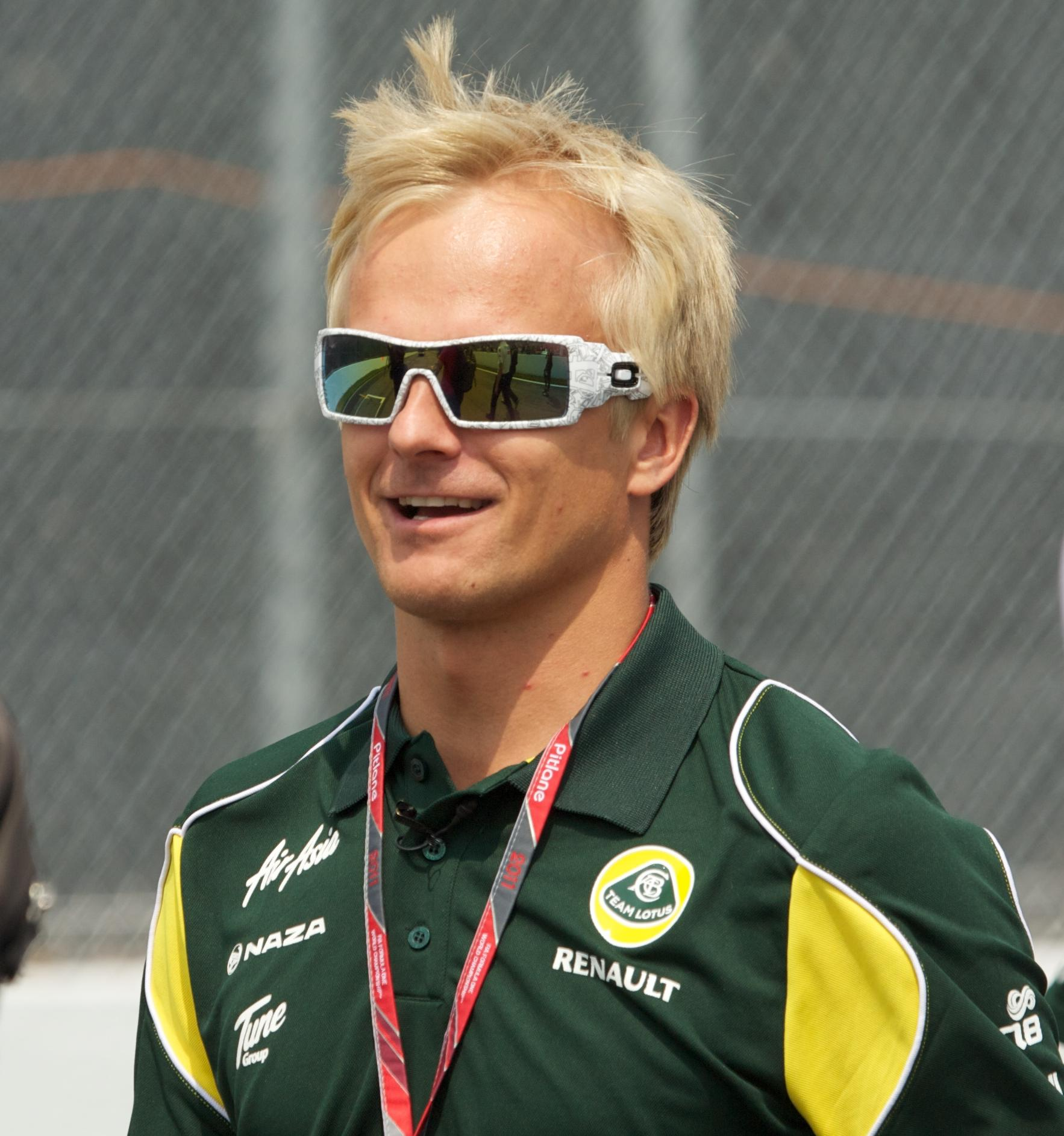
Heikki Kovalainen qualified sixteenth, the first time he reached Q2 in the 2012 season.

The seventeen remaining drivers went straight out onto the softer tyres for Q2, with Lewis Hamilton and Nico Rosberg quickly establishing themselves at the top of the timing charts. As the session wore on, the track became "faster"; more rubber from the tyres was laid down on the racing line – the shortest, fastest and most ideal way through a corner – allowing the drivers to find more grip, and therefore more speed, producing a faster lap time.

Late in the session Kimi Räikkönen, the 2007 world champion, was eliminated by teammate Romain Grosjean. Räikkönen's first lap time initially looked to be enough to see him through to Q3, but Grosjean's final lap was quick enough to see the 2011 GP2 Series champion through to the third and final period for the fourth time in as many races; conversely, Felipe Massa missed the Q3 cut-off for the fourth race in succession.

Like Räikkönen, Sauber's Kamui Kobayashi was also a victim of his teammate's final flying lap; having set the fastest lap time in Q1, Sergio Pérez progressed to Q3. Paul di Resta also advanced to Q3 despite missing the second free practice session, though teammate Nico Hülkenberg was not quick enough and missed the cut-off. Meanwhile, Bruno Senna's final lap was marked by sector times that suggested he would also advance to Q3, but a mistake at Turn 13 cost him dearly, and he had to settle for fifteenth overall.

Heikki Kovalainen only nominated to set a single lap time at the end of the period. Unable to challenge the other teams in terms of raw pace, Kovalainen finished the period in sixteenth after Pastor Maldonado was stricken by a KERS issue, and failed to set a lap time. This left him seventeenth overall; with his five-place penalty for an unscheduled gearbox change, he would start the race in twenty-second.

==== Q3 ====
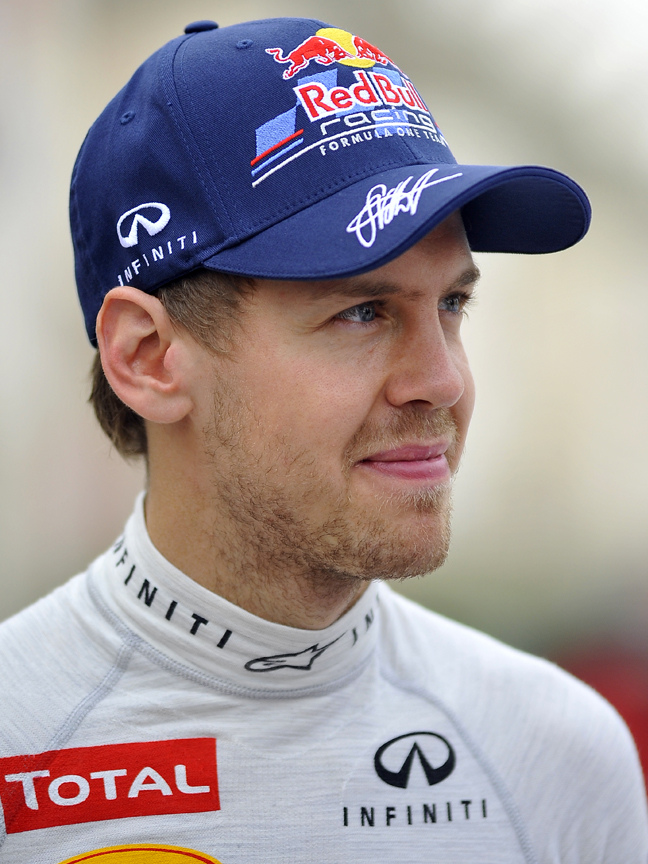
Sebastian Vettel qualified on pole position for the first time in 2012.

Eight different teams were represented in the final qualifying period. The McLarens of Hamilton and Button, and the Red Bulls of Vettel and Webber each set two times during the period; of the remaining six, four set a lap time. Fernando Alonso and Paul di Resta elected not to complete timed laps. Having used all three sets of the soft tyres allocated to them for the qualifying session, they had no fresh sets of tyres left over and decided to preserve their tyres for the race. Alonso took to the circuit for a sighting lap, automatically giving him a higher grid position than any driver who remained in the pits. As a result, Alonso and di Resta qualified ninth and tenth overall. However, as they had not set times, they would be free to start the race on whatever set of tyres they chose to.

Sebastian Vettel qualified on pole position, his and his team's first since the 2011 Brazilian Grand Prix. Vettel's lap time of 1:32.422 was just two-tenths of a second faster than his Q2 time of 1:32.474, which he recorded at the 2009, the last time Formula One used the "Grand Prix" configuration of the Bahrain circuit; prior to the ban on refuelling introduced for the 2010 season, cars were required completed Q3 with a full tank of fuel. This led to a trend in which the fastest time of the weekend was set in Q2 as drivers were allowed to set lap times with as little fuel in the car possible. Although Jarno Trulli qualified on pole for the 2009 race, Vettel's Q2 time was a second faster. With the ban on refuelling in place since 2010, drivers are now able to complete Q3 in a low-fuel configuration, making Vettel's time a more-appropriate benchmark for comparison purposes.

By the end of the session, just half of a second covered the top five runners. Vettel led Lewis Hamilton, with Mark Webber in third. Webber's first timed lap was marked by an incident at Turn 10 where he locked the front wheel up, dragging it across the surface of the circuit, and costing him time. Jenson Button finished fourth, once again out-qualified by teammate Hamilton. Nico Rosberg, who qualified on pole in Shanghai one week previously, was fifth. Daniel Ricciardo and Romain Grosjean finished sixth and seventh, with both drivers only completing one timed lap. Ricciardo was just one-tenth of a second ahead of Grosjean, and one-tenth behind Rosberg. Initial speculation at the start of the period suggested that Sergio Pérez would not set a lap time, but the Mexican driver took to the circuit and finished eighth overall.

==== Post-qualifying ====
Pastor Maldonado's grid penalty meant that he would start the race in twenty-second position. Michael Schumacher was also given a gearbox penalty, demoting him to twenty-second position. By virtue of this, Maldonado was promoted to twenty-first position.

Jean-Éric Vergne was given a reprimand by the stewards for missing the weighbridge after qualifying.

Shortly after qualifying ended, speculation in the media suggested that Force India had received no coverage during the broadcast as punishment for withdrawing from the second free practice session. The speculation began after Sky Sports commentator Martin Brundle remarked that the cameras had not shown Paul di Resta's final lap in Q2, which saw him enter the final qualifying period. The team refused to be drawn into debate over the speculation, though di Resta commented that "I saw my car". Bernie Ecclestone explained the team's lack of coverage as the television director wanting to concentrate on the pole sitter "rather than somebody who was going to be tenth".

=== Race ===
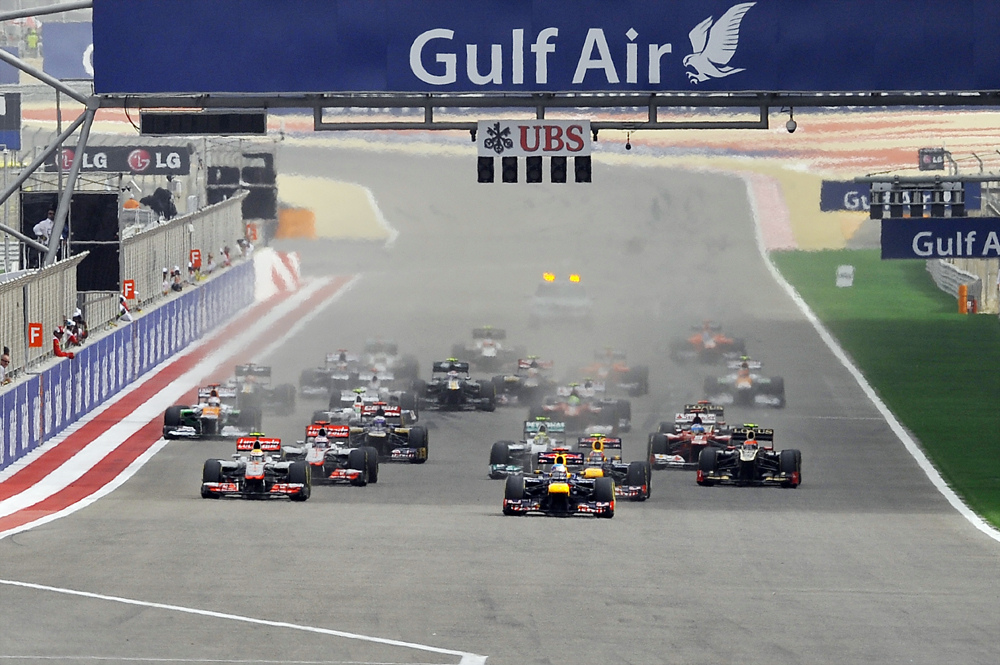
Vettel led from pole position into the first corner

The race was the first of 10 (including all the European races and Singapore) this season to begin at 12:00 UTC (15:00 local) in a much more European friendly viewing time. It started under warm cloudy conditions with an ambient temperature of 27 °C (81 °F) and a track temperature of 32 °C (90 °F). Since Fernando Alonso and Paul di Resta did not set a time in Q3 they, along with the 14 drivers behind them, could start on either the soft 'option' tyre or the medium 'prime' tyre. All but Kamui Kobayashi opted to start on the soft compound yellow banded tyre.

As the red lights went out it was the drivers on the 'clean' driving line of the grid that mostly got the better start, especially towards the front half of the grid. The top three drivers from qualifying all held their position as Sebastian Vettel led into the first corner. Mark Webber did not have KERS for the first lap and lost any opportunity to gain on Lewis Hamilton in second. Romain Grosjean, Alonso and Kimi Räikkönen all made great starts compared to the drivers on the dirty (and presumably sandy) side of the grid while Australian Daniel Ricciardo, who started from his best ever qualifying position (6th), made a terrible start as the big name teams overtook him and left him 11th after the first corner. Jenson Button slipped to 6th by turn one, Bruno Senna was up to 10th from 15th while his teammate Pastor Maldonado was 15th after lap 1 following his gearbox penalty which forced him to start from 21st position. The end of lap one saw the drivers move into single file while at the front Vettel led by more than two seconds. Heikki Kovalainen pitted after the first lap as he punctured his left rear tyre in an incident not clearly shown on television; there appeared to be some contact near turn 10 where Ricciardo hit Kovalainen perhaps puncturing his tyre while Ricciardo lost some bodywork from the car resulting in a damaged front wing.

On the start of lap 3 Felipe Massa made a move down the inside of Räikkönen for 7th. They were side by side through turn 1 and 2 when Räikkönen yielded the position. At the start of lap 4, Grosjean was the first to use the DRS successfully on Webber when he took 3rd place with ease through turn 1. During the fifth lap, Räikkönen re-took 7th as Massa went deep into turn 4 and this resulted in Räikkönen gaining better traction through the 'S' turns (turns 5–7) squeezing Massa behind him. In the early stages it was Romain Grosjean who had fast race pace and on lap 7 he again overtook using DRS, this time Hamilton was his victim. Lotus teammate Räikkönen was also putting in comparatively quick lap times and overtook Button around the outside prior to turn 4. Further down the field, Maldonado in the Williams was overtaken by a DRS assisted Toro Rosso's Jean-Éric Vergne only to grab Vergne's slipstream and retake the position while Vergne still had his DRS wing open.

Lap 8 confirmed that Ricciardo had damaged his front wing when he pitted to switch to the medium tyre and swap his damaged front wing for a new one. Button complained on the radio about his rear tyres losing performance while the Lotus looked very strong as Räikkönen again put the DRS to good use and claimed Alonso on the 9th lap for 5th position. Button, Massa and Nico Rosberg all pitted together with Button coming out into 'clean air' however Rosberg and Massa rejoined behind a Marussia. The next lap saw Hamilton, Webber, and Alonso all pit together in that order but Hamilton had a problem with the left rear and was stopped for nearly ten seconds forcing a slow pit time of 28.341 seconds, dropping him behind Alonso, Button and Rosberg. Compounding Hamilton's problems, on the straight before turn 4 Rosberg desperately forced Hamilton wide and off-road but could not hold Hamilton back from taking the position. The incident was to be looked at after the race. Replays showed Hamilton's disappointment as he shook his head while waiting to be released.

The leader, Vettel, pitted and left the Paul di Resta (who had not yet pitted) in the lead – the first time a Force India has led a lap since the 2009 Belgian Grand Prix when Giancarlo Fisichella was driving for them. By lap 15 all the cars had made at least one stop. At this stage, Vettel led the Lotus cars followed by teammate Webber and the Button-led McLarens. Alonso, Rosberg, Massa and Pérez rounded out the top 10 while 7 time world champion Michael Schumacher was in 13th – still clawing his way back into points contention.

Lap 21 saw Räikkönen and Rosberg the only drivers in the top 9 on the soft compound after both saving a set during qualifying. During the same lap, Maldonando used DRS to put a move on Pérez, however went deep and the two duelled to turn 4 when di Resta who was behind them pounced through the inside as they battled each wide of the apex. Crucially, Räikkönen on softs had caught his teammate and was right behind him but was not able to overtake him, even with the DRS. It appeared the Lotus' were equally matched and Räikkönen was starting to lose grip from either following the dirty air of his teammate or his tyres were hitting the 'cliff' (performance-wise) or both. Eventually Räikkönen passed his teammate using the DRS but "was it too late?" the commentators questioned.

Lap 23 saw Webber, Alonso and Hamilton all pit again and yet again Hamilton had a problem with his left rear leaving him stationary for a mammoth 12.2 seconds while his pit time hit 30.622 seconds. Hamilton had an identical problem from the first pit stop with his left rear wheel nut not working properly. For the second time in the race Rosberg forced someone wide and off-road in the straight before turn 4, this time Alonso was his victim. Alonso was very vocal on the radio on Rosberg's actions which saw the stewards again decide to look at the incident after the race and not during it. Lap 25 saw Maldonado behind the duelling Rosberg and Alonso obtain a left rear puncture which sent him into a 360-degree spin and forced him to retire.

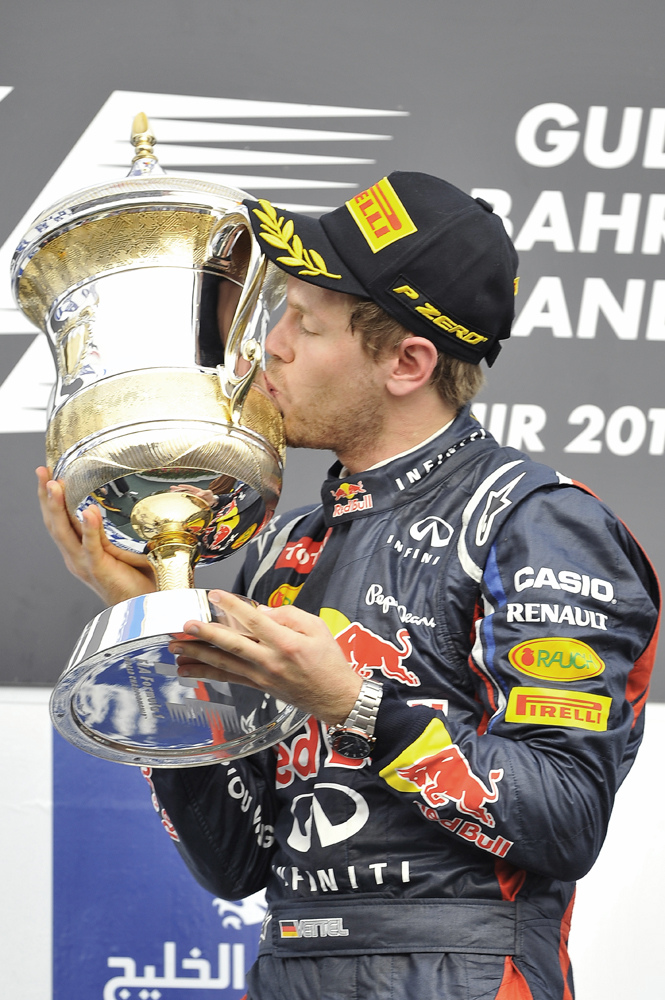
Vettel crossed the line in first place to take his first victory of the season

Lap 31 saw Vettel lead from the two Lotus cars and Webber. By this stage it was clear that di Resta was on a two-stop strategy along with Sauber's Kobayshi. Räikkönen also started to catch leader Vettel and was within the DRS zone on lap 33. Vettel was told on his radio to dig deep and find some pace to defend with. Räikkönen moved ever closer to Vettel and on lap 36 attempted an overtake down the inside but then under braking switched to the outside unsuccessfully. Vettel was told "push to pass" meaning he was able to use his maximum 18,000rpm down the main straight to defend against Räikkönen and his DRS. Presumably Vettel had been shifting gear at under the permitted 18,000rpm limit in a bid to save fuel, as consequently Vettel stopped right after the completion of the race at the pit exit.

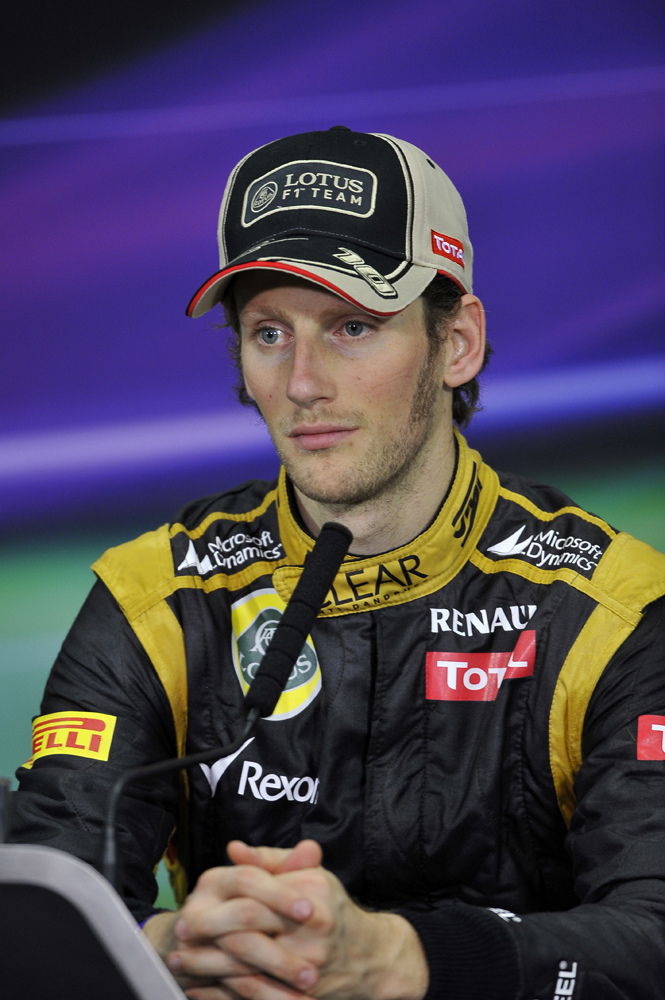
Romain Grosjean finished third to take his first podium in F1

Lap 39 saw Hamilton set the fastest lap at the time from 10th position. It also saw the last round of pit stops from leader Vettel, Räikkönen and Red Bull driver Webber. Backmarkers were now starting to be lapped, some for the second occasion of the race. After the pit stops, where both Vettel and Räikkönen both chose medium tyres, the gap that between them was under a second was out to more than three seconds. All of the top 10 were now on the preferred medium compound.

Räikkönen was told on lap 46 that they expect to catch Vettel at the end because of Vettel's predicted higher tyre degradation. Kobayshi was in 11th on a two-stop strategy but was lapping nearly two-seconds slower than his rivals and thus pitted for a third time on lap 50. Räikkönen briefly fought back to trail the leader by less than three seconds, but then slipped back to the previous three-second plus margin. Rosberg caught di Resta in 5th as the Scotsman started to lose tyre performance. A desperate di Resta was told via team radio to use a double KERS boost on the start/finish straight, meaning to use his remaining KERS out of the final corner and also to use his new KERS that gets reset when crossing the start/finish line. Finally, the Mercedes of Rosberg managed to pass the Force India and quickly pushed ahead. Di Resta, now in 6th, now found himself under pressure from Button after losing four seconds in three laps. Amazingly lucky for di Resta, just as Button was in the DRS zone and would most likely pass the Scotsman, Button developed a left rear puncture and pitted immediately leaving di Resta in 6th place and Button out of points contention in 12th.

Senna retired with three laps to go making it a double retirement for the Williams team. Nico Rosberg had a broken exhaust for some time but was told not worry by the team during lap 56. On the same lap Button had a worrying sound come from his McLaren-Mercedes engine and was forced to retire from the race. Going into the final lap, the double world champion led with Räikkönen, Grosjean and Webber a cut above the other drivers. Crossing the line Vettel claimed his 17th victory starting from pole position and his 22nd overall. It was also the first win for both Vettel and Red Bull for the 2012 season. His engineer told him to stop at the pit exit instead of completing a victory lap most likely due to low fuel. The two Lotus cars were next to cross the line with Räikkönen (2nd) achieving his first podium since the 2009 Italian Grand Prix where he drove for Scuderia Ferrari. Romain Grosjean finished third which was his best ever result in Formula One, surpassing his previous best of 6th place from last round. With his podium, Grosjean was also the first Frenchman to reach podium in almost 14 years (Jean Alesi in 1998 was the last time it occurred). Red Bull teammate Mark Webber finished 4th for the fourth consecutive time this season leaving him as clearly the most consistent driver of the 2012 championship so far.

Some 55 seconds from the lead was Nico Rosberg who was lucky not to get penalised by the stewards for dangerous driving. Di Resta managed to hold off the Ferrari of Alonso by less than 0.3 of a second and made his two-stop strategy work effectively to claim 6th place and equal his best ever Formula One result (2011 Singapore Grand Prix). Alonso later said that it was a "shame that I was missing one more straight to get past Di Resta in the end". Hamilton, who lost around fifteen seconds through wasted pit stop time, was a disappointing 8th; while behind him Felipe Massa picked up his first points of the year by finishing 9th. Further back was Schumacher who did well to claim the final point after starting from the 22nd grid position. Both Sauber and Scuderia Toro Rosso lacked race pace and were out of the points meanwhile at the back the Caterham F1 team performed the best of the bottom three teams.

In four races the 2012 Formula One championship has had four different points leaders and four different winners, highlighting the unpredictability of this year's field.

As a consequence of the race, Vettel took the lead in the Drivers' Championship from Hamilton. He became the fourth driver to top the standings from four races, and also the fourth race winner. Hamilton remained second, four points behind Vettel, whilst Webber jumped in front of Button to move into third with his fourth consecutive fourth place. Webber was just one point behind Hamilton, and Button was only five points behind him; with Alonso in fifth. The Constructors' Championship was now led by Red Bull, who also took the lead from McLaren (who were now nine points behind them). Lotus moved up from sixth to third in the standings after their first podium. Ferrari fell to fourth whilst Mercedes remained fifth.

== Support events ==
The event took place between 20 and 22 April where throughout the weekend there was a range of support events. Taking part in the 2012 Formula 1 Gulf Air Bahrain Grand Prix program was the first round of the 2012 Porsche Supercup season (2 races); the second round of the 2012 GP2 Series (1 feature race, 1 sprint race); and the WGA Supercars ME Championship (two 7 lap races).

== Classification ==
=== Qualifying ===
Pos.	No.	Driver	Constructor	Part 1	Part 2	Part 3	Grid
1	1	(Germany) Sebastian Vettel	Red Bull-Renault	1:34.308	1:33.527	1:32.422	1
2	4	(United Kingdom) Lewis Hamilton	McLaren-Mercedes	1:34.813	1:33.209	1:32.520	2
3	2	(Australia) Mark Webber	Red Bull-Renault	1:34.015	1:33.311	1:32.637	3
4	3	(United Kingdom) Jenson Button	McLaren-Mercedes	1:34.792	1:33.416	1:32.711	4
5	8	(Germany) Nico Rosberg	Mercedes	1:34.588	1:33.219	1:32.821	5
6	16	(Australia) Daniel Ricciardo	Toro Rosso-Ferrari	1:33.988	1:33.556	1:32.912	6
7	10	(France) Romain Grosjean	Lotus-Renault	1:34.041	1:33.246	1:33.008	7
8	15	(Mexico) Sergio Pérez	Sauber-Ferrari	1:33.814	1:33.660	1:33.394	8
9	5	(Spain) Fernando Alonso	Ferrari	1:34.760	1:33.403	no time^{3}	9
10	11	(United Kingdom) Paul di Resta	Force India-Mercedes	1:34.624	1:33.510	no time^{3}	10
11	9	(Finland) Kimi Räikkönen	Lotus-Renault	1:34.552	1:33.789		11
12	14	(Japan) Kamui Kobayashi	Sauber-Ferrari	1:34.131	1:33.806		12
13	12	(Germany) Nico Hülkenberg	Force India-Mercedes	1:34.601	1:33.807		13
14	6	(Brazil) Felipe Massa	Ferrari	1:34.372	1:33.912		14
15	19	(Brazil) Bruno Senna	Williams-Renault	1:34.466	1:34.017		15
16	20	(Finland) Heikki Kovalainen	Caterham-Renault	1:34.852	1:36.132		16
17	18	(Venezuela) Pastor Maldonado	Williams-Renault	1:34.639	no time^{4}		21^{1}
18	7	(Germany) Michael Schumacher	Mercedes	1:34.865			22^{2}
19	17	(France) Jean-Éric Vergne	Toro Rosso-Ferrari	1:35.014			17
20	21	(Russia) Vitaly Petrov	Caterham-Renault	1:35.823			18
21	25	(France) Charles Pic	Marussia-Cosworth	1:37.683			19
22	22	(Spain) Pedro de la Rosa	HRT-Cosworth	1:37.883			20
23	24	(Germany) Timo Glock	Marussia-Cosworth	1:37.905			23
24	23	(India) Narain Karthikeyan	HRT-Cosworth	1:38.314			24
107% time: 1:40.380

Notes
^1 – Pastor Maldonado was given a five-place grid penalty for a gearbox change.
^2 – Michael Schumacher was also given a five-place grid penalty for a gearbox change. The penalty demoted him to twenty-second, moving Pastor Maldonado up one place.
^3 – Both Fernando Alonso and Paul di Resta did not complete a timed lap – only commencing exploratory laps (Alonso with the faster sector times). This was due to tactical reasons in regards to tyre preservation for the race.
^4 – Pastor Maldonado did not compete in Q2 due to a KERS problem.

=== Race ===
Pos	No	Driver	Constructor	Laps	Time/Retired	Grid	Points
1	1	(Germany) Sebastian Vettel	Red Bull-Renault	57	1:35:10.990	1	25
2	9	(Finland) Kimi Räikkönen	Lotus-Renault	57	+3.333	11	18
3	10	(France) Romain Grosjean	Lotus-Renault	57	+10.194	7	15
4	2	(Australia) Mark Webber	Red Bull-Renault	57	+38.788	3	12
5	8	(Germany) Nico Rosberg	Mercedes	57	+55.460	5	10
6	11	(United Kingdom) Paul di Resta	Force India-Mercedes	57	+57.543	10	8
7	5	(Spain) Fernando Alonso	Ferrari	57	+57.803	9	6
8	4	(United Kingdom) Lewis Hamilton	McLaren-Mercedes	57	+58.984	2	4
9	6	(Brazil) Felipe Massa	Ferrari	57	+1:04.999	14	2
10	7	(Germany) Michael Schumacher	Mercedes	57	+1:11.490	22	1
11	15	(Mexico) Sergio Pérez	Sauber-Ferrari	57	+1:12.702	8	
12	12	(Germany) Nico Hülkenberg	Force India-Mercedes	57	+1:16.539	13	
13	14	(Japan) Kamui Kobayashi	Sauber-Ferrari	57	+1:30.334	12	
14	17	(France) Jean-Éric Vergne	Toro Rosso-Ferrari	57	+1:33.723	17	
15	16	(Australia) Daniel Ricciardo	Toro Rosso-Ferrari	56	+1 Lap	6	
16	21	(Russia) Vitaly Petrov	Caterham-Renault	56	+1 Lap	18	
17	20	(Finland) Heikki Kovalainen	Caterham-Renault	56	+1 Lap	16	
18	3	(United Kingdom) Jenson Button	McLaren-Mercedes	55	Exhaust/differential	4	
19	24	(Germany) Timo Glock	Marussia-Cosworth	55	+2 Laps	23	
20	22	(Spain) Pedro de la Rosa	HRT-Cosworth	55	+2 Laps	20	
21	23	(India) Narain Karthikeyan	HRT-Cosworth	55	+2 Laps	24	
22	19	(Brazil) Bruno Senna	Williams-Renault	54	Vibration	15	
Ret	18	(Venezuela) Pastor Maldonado	Williams-Renault	25	Puncture	21	
Ret	25	(France) Charles Pic	Marussia-Cosworth	24	Engine	19	

Note: Button and Senna both did not finish the race, but were classified as they completed more than 90% of the race winner's distance.

== Championship standings after the race ==
Drivers' Championship standings

	Pos.	Driver	Points
4	1	(Germany) Sebastian Vettel	53
1	2	(United Kingdom) Lewis Hamilton	49
1	3	(Australia) Mark Webber	48
2	4	(United Kingdom) Jenson Button	43
2	5	(Spain) Fernando Alonso	43

Constructors' Championship standings

	Pos.	Constructor	Points
1	1	(Austria) Red Bull-Renault	101
1	2	(United Kingdom) McLaren-Mercedes	92
3	3	(United Kingdom) Lotus-Renault	57
1	4	(Italy) Ferrari	45
	5	(Germany) Mercedes	37

- Note: Only the top five positions are included for both sets of standings.

== See also ==
- Politics and sports
- 1985 South African Grand Prix, which saw several teams boycott the event due to apartheid.
- 2011 Bahrain Grand Prix, which was cancelled due to the Bahraini uprising.
- 2012 Bahrain GP2 Series round
- 2022 Saudi Arabian Grand Prix, which saw several drivers considering not to race after a missile attack by the Yemeni Houthi movement on a nearby facility.
- 2026 Bahrain Grand Prix, whose original April date in Bahrain was called off due to the 2026 Iran war before the race was relocated to Malaysia.

Previous race: 2012 Chinese Grand Prix	FIA Formula One World Championship; 2012 season	Next race: 2012 Spanish Grand Prix
Previous race: 2010 Bahrain Grand Prix; 2011 edition cancelled	Bahrain Grand Prix	Next race: 2013 Bahrain Grand Prix
