= Background of the 2011 Bahraini uprising =

The background of the 2011 Bahraini uprising dates back to the beginning of the twentieth century. The Bahraini people have protested sporadically throughout the last decades demanding social, economic and political rights. Demonstrations were present as early as the 1920s and the first municipal election was held in 1926. Ruled by Al Khalifas since 1783, Bahrain was a British protectorate for most of the twentieth century. The National Union Committee (NUC) formed in 1954 was the earliest serious challenge to the status quo. Two year after its formation, NUC leaders were imprisoned and deported by authorities.

In 1971, Bahrain became an independent state and in 1973 the country held its first parliamentary election. However, only two years later, the constitution was suspended and the assembly dissolved by the late Emir. In 1992, 280 society leaders demanded the return of the parliament and constitution, which the government rejected. Two years later a popular uprising erupted. Throughout the uprising large demonstrations and acts of violence occurred. Over forty people were killed, including several detainees while in police custody and at least three policemen. In 1999, Hamad bin Isa Al Khalifa succeeded his father. He successfully ended the uprising in 2001 after introducing wide range reforms. The following year, opposition associations "felt betrayed" after the government issued a unilateral new constitution. They boycotted the 2002 parliamentary election, however in 2006 one of them, Al Wefaq won a majority. The participation in elections increased the split between opposition associations. Haq Movement was founded and utilized street protests to seek change instead of bringing change within the parliament. The period between 2007 and 2010 saw sporadic protests which were followed by large arrests.

The state of human rights in Bahrain was criticized in the period between 1975 and 2001. Following 2001 reforms, human rights improved significantly. They began deteriorating again in the end of 2007 when torture and repression tactics were being used again. By 2010, torture had become common and Bahrain's human rights record was described as "dismal" by Human Rights Watch. The Shia minority have long complained of what they call systemic discrimination. They accuse the government of naturalizing Sunnis from neighboring countries and gerrymandering electoral districts. Bahrain is relatively poor when compared to its oil-rich Gulf neighbors; its oil has "virtually dried up" and it depends on banking and the tourism sector. Unemployment rate in Bahrain is among the highest in the region. Extreme poverty did not exist in Bahrain where the average daily income is US$12.8, however 11 percent of citizens suffered from relative poverty.

== Modern history ==
The Al Khalifas have ruled Bahrain since 1783 after expelling the Persians. In 1868, Bahrain was captured and dominated by the British. The country was a protectorate "guided" by the British, despite having the Al Khalifas as rulers. In 1923, the British replaced Sheikh Issa bin Ali with his son and introduced a series of administrative reforms. Three years later the British placed the country under the de facto rule of Charles Belgrave who operated as an adviser to the ruler until 1957. Having no legal code, the country's judiciary was run by Belgrave giving him the ability to control any opposition movement.

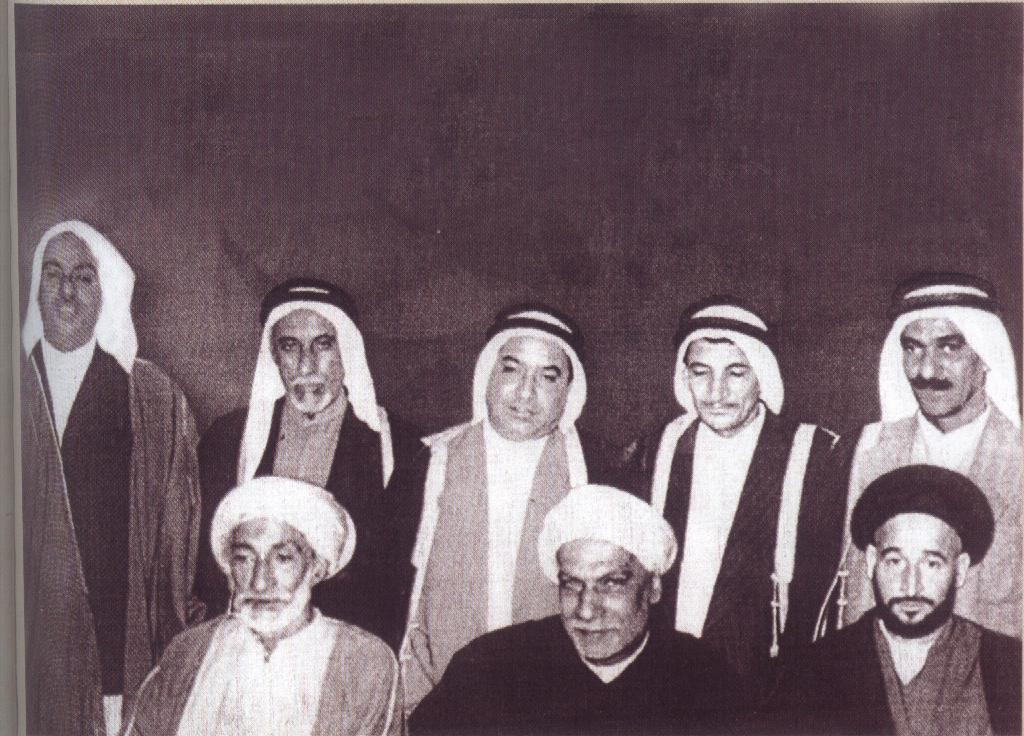
The National Union Committee was equally composed of Sunnis and Shias.

In the 1950s sectarian clashes occurred when a group of Sunnis including members of the royal family, among them the ruler's brother, attacked a Shia religious ritual and a neighborhood. Although many thought it was a "deliberate provocation to create sectarian divisions", the violence lasted for two years. In 1954, the National Union Committee (NUC) was set up by middle-class Sunnis and Shias. They said Belgrave was "helping foment religious hatred and imprisoning innocent people" and demanded his removal as well as installing a democratic system and a code of law. The NUC is regarded by Bahraini scholar Abdulhadi Khalaf as the "earliest serious and still enduring challenge to ethnic politics in Bahrain". The committee lasted for two years until the British crushed the uprising, imprisoning and deporting its leaders.

In 1965 a month-long uprising broke after hundreds of workers at Bahrain Petroleum Company were laid off. Several general strikes were staged, however the movement was crushed again by the British. In 1966, the British persuaded Bahrain to appoint another "adviser", this time a Colonel called Ian Henderson. The purpose, according to secret British documents was "to give Henderson a free hand to reorganise it [the "Special Branch"] into an efficient, modern covert surveillance 'anti terrorist' organisation". Henderson was then known for his alleged role in ordering torture and assassinations during Kenya's Mau Mau Uprising. Henderson freed all those imprisoned in the 1965 uprising and allowed protest-related militants to return. This move was analyzed later as "building up an intricate system of infiltrators and double agents inside the protest movement".

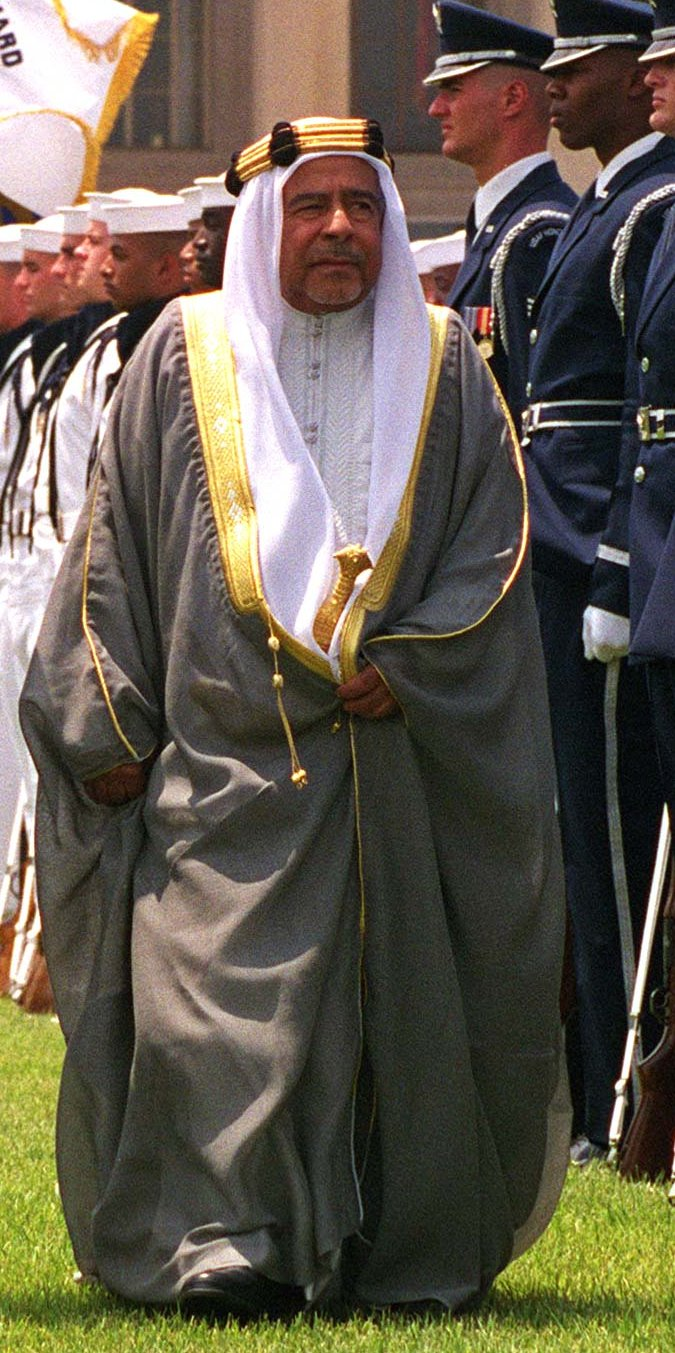
The late Emir, Isa bin Salman Al Khalifa dissolved the parliament and suspended the constitution in 1975.

In 1971 Bahrain became independent from Britain and in 1973 the country held its first parliamentary election. Most of the elected members were independents and leftists who called for reforms such as limiting the spendings of the royal family. Two years later the constitution was suspended and the assembly dissolved by the late Emir, Isa bin Salman al-Khalifa after it rejected the State Security Law. The act also known as "the precautionary law" was proposed by Henderson. It gave police wide arresting powers and allowed individuals to be held in prison without trial or charge for up to three years for mere suspicion "that they might be a threat to the state". An official said the Parliament had "hindered the government" and it would only be restored "[o]nce we feel that we need it, when it is suitable for our society and development".

Starting in August 1975, widespread arrests were conducted including members of the dissolved parliament. The "ruthless system of repression" launched by Henderson lasted for over twenty five years. During this period, opposition demanded the restoration of the parliament and constitution. Repeated allegations of systematic torture, arbitrary arrests of thousands and assassinations made by opposition and human rights activists were denied by Henderson who said he "has never been involved in torture nor has he ever ordered his officers to torture those who have been arrested".

In 1981, the government arrested seventy three individuals and accused them of plotting an Iran sponsored coup d'état. They were held in solitary confinement and allegedly tortured before getting long term sentences. In 1992, a petition signed by 280 society leaders, including some of the dissolved parliament members demanded the restoration of the national assembly. Initially, the government set up a thirty-member appointed "Shura council" assigned with "commenting" on government proposed legislation. Another petition the following month concluded that the newly formed council "does not replace the national assembly as a constitutional and legislative authority". A delegation of six members, half Sunnis and half Shias representing petition organizers met with the Emir who told them Shura council "was all [they] could expect".

=== 1990s uprising ===
In 1994, an uprising erupted in which leftists, liberals and Islamists joined forces to demand democratic reforms. The uprising described then as the largest in the country's history, included widespread demonstrations and violence. It started in June 1994, when over 1,500 demonstrator organized a sit-in front of Ministry of Labor protesting the increasing rate of unemployment which had reached 15 percent. Riot police dispersed them using tear gas. Similar incidents occurred in August and September. Another petition was launched, this time it was open to all citizens. Organizers said they collected over 20,000 signatures most of whom were Shia.

During the uprising, opposition leaders were arrested and some exiled. Some protesters used Molotov cocktails to attack "police stations, banks and commercial properties". On the other hand, riot police used tear and rubber bullets, sometimes "fired at street level and from helicopters". It was also reported that police used live ammunition on some occasions. Opposition activists accused the government of "deliberately fomenting sectarian hatreds". Over forty people were killed, including several detainees while in police custody allegedly due to torture and at least three policemen.

=== 2000s ===
Protests and violence continued until February 2001 when the new Emir brought several political reforms to the country. Following intensive contacts and discussions, opposition leaders accepted the National Action Charter of Bahrain proposed by the Emir. The Charter called for "a constitutional monarchy, an independent judiciary and a bicameral legislature made-up of a lower house of elected representatives and an upper house of appointed legislators. The charter also gave equal rights to men and women, with all citizens having equal political rights and being entitled to elections and candidacy according to the law". Over 98 percent of Bahraini people voted in favor of the Charter.

In 2002, the government unilaterally announced a new constitution. Despite promising that the appointed upper house "would be limited to 'advising'", it was given more powers and exercised a "de facto veto" over the elected lower half. The government also gave a controversial general amnesty which included opposition activists as well as alleged torturers. Political parties remained banned, but were allowed to operate as associations. Other than that, most of the reforms were important, including increasing freedom of expression, releasing over 1,300 "political" prisoners, revoking the State Security Law, reforming police and ending torture. The Emir of Bahrain became a King who enjoyed wide executive authorities which include appointing the Prime Minister and his ministers, commanding the army, chairing the Higher Judicial Council, appointing the parliament's upper half and dissolving its elected lower half.

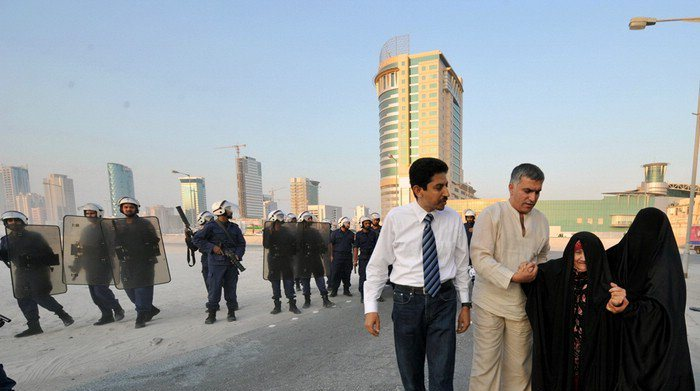
Human rights defenders Abdulhadi al-Khawaja and Nabeel Rajab helping an old woman after police attacked a peaceful protest in August, 2010.

The 2002 parliamentary election was boycotted by four opposition societies including Al Wefaq who "felt betrayed by the king’s unilateral reform" and "pushed for a return to the 1973 constitution". They cited gerrymandering of electoral districts in favor of Sunnis as another reason to boycott the elections. In 2005, following the introduction of the controversial political associations act, the opposition split into those who re-registered under it and those who defied it. Al Wefaq and Wa'ad witnessed major splits and Haq Movement was founded. The split went further after the 2006 parliamentary election, in which both Shia and Sunni Islamists fared well; Al Wefaq won 17 out of 40 seats. Haq Movement had boycotted the elections and instead used street protests to seek change.

In December 2007, protests erupted in a number of Shia villages and a protester died during one. Opposition activists claimed he was suffocated by the excessive amount tear gas while the government said he died of natural causes. Widespread arrests were conducted following the protests and have continued in the next months. In December the following year further arrests were made including three members of Haq Movement. In April 2009, the king "pardoned" 178 detainees.

In the summer of 2010, authorities launched a two-month-long crackdown campaign against opposition activists arresting more than 250 individuals including 23 leading activists, most of them members of Haq Movement and Al Wafa' Islamic party. They were accused of forming a "terrorist network" aiming to overthrow the government. In response, protesters burned tires and clashed with police. However, a month later Al Wefaq opposition party, which was not targeted by the crackdown won a plurality in the parliamentary election. Since then, tensions have increased "dangerously".

== Human rights ==
The period between 1975 and 2001 known as the "State Security Law Era", saw wide range of human rights violations including arbitrary arrests, detention without trial, torture and forced exile. After the Emir Hamad Al Khalifa (now king) succeeded his father Isa Al Khalifa in 1999, he introduced wide reforms and human rights improved significantly. These moves were described by Amnesty International as representing a "historic period of human rights".

Human rights conditions started to decline by 2007 when torture began to be employed again and in 2010 it was described by Human Rights Watch as "dismal".

=== Torture ===
During the "State Security Law Era", torture was frequently used by the Bahraini government and resulted in the deaths of several individuals. In 1997, Human Right Watch said it found that "[s]ystematic beating as well as other forms of physical and psychological abuse of detainees are pervasive in Bahrain" and that at least seven individuals had died while in police custody. The government denied these reports calling them "simply not true, and propagandist in nature".

After the Emir Hamad bin Isa Al Khalifa succeeded his father Isa Al Khalifa in 1999, reports of torture declined dramatically and conditions of detention improved. However Royal Decree 56 of 2002 gave effective immunity to all those accused of torture during the 1990s uprising and before (including notorious figures such as Ian Henderson and Adel Flaifel.). Towards the end of 2007 torture began to be employed again and by 2010 had become common again.

=== Shia grievances ===
The Shia majority ruled by the Sunni Al khalifa family since the 18th century have long complained of what they call systemic discrimination. They are blocked from serving in top military and political positions and authorities have reportedly imported and naturalized about 70,000 Sunnis from Pakistan and Syria since 1999 in an attempt to increase the Sunni percentage. Shia grievances were sparked further when in 2006 Salah Al Bandar, then an adviser to the Cabinet Affairs Ministry revealed an alleged political conspiracy aiming to marginalize Shia community in all fields of life. In 2010, Al Wefaq the main Shia party won 60% of votes, however it only received 45% of seats due to alleged gerrymandering of electoral districts in favor of Sunnis.

=== International rankings ===
After implementing reforms, Bahrain gained high international rankings, however as human rights conditions deteriorated, it lost many of what it had gained in the previous period. Between 2006 and 2011 Bahrain went down 51 ranks on the Democracy Index (Economist Intelligence Unit), moving it from "hybrid regime" and "constitutional monarchy" to "authoritarian regime" and "absolute monarchy". The Freedom in the World index on political freedom classified Bahrain as "Not Free" in 2010-2011. Freedom House "Freedom on the Net" survey classified "Net status" as "Not free". It also noted that more than 1,000 websites were blocked in Bahrain. The Press Freedom Index (Reporters Without Borders) declined significantly. In 2002 Bahrain was ranked #67 and by 2010 it had become #144. The Freedom of the Press classified Bahrain in 2011 as "Not Free".

== Economy ==
Despite its oil-rich Gulf neighbors, Bahrain's oil, discovered in 1932 has "virtually dried up" making it relatively poor compared to countries in its region. In recent decades, Bahrain has moved towards banking and the tourism sector making it one of the most important financial hubs in the region and has since held some of the top international rankings in economic freedom and business friendly countries, making it, as of 2012, the freest economy in the Middle East, according to the 2012 edition of Index of Economic Freedom, published by The Heritage Foundation and The Wall Street Journal.

=== Unemployment ===
Unemployment rate in Bahrain is among the highest in GCC countries. According to a report released by Al Masah Capital in 2011, the total unemployment was 15% and youth unemployment was 20%. Gulf News said total unemployment was as low as 3.7% in 2010. Bahrain state news agency said unemployment was down from 15% in 1998 to 5.4% in 2005, however CIA World Factbook estimated unemployment in 2005 to be 15%.

=== Poverty ===
A study done by United Nations Development Programme in 2003 found that extreme poverty did not exist in Bahrain where the average daily income is US$12.8, however 11 percent of citizens suffered from relative poverty. Semi-official studies found that the poverty threshold in the country in 1995 was .د.ب 308. Bahrain Centre for Human Rights said that by 2007 it had increased to .د.ب 400 at least, making half of Bahrainis under the line of poverty. In 2008, the government rejected UN conclusion that 2 percent of Bahrainis lived in "slum-like conditions". Poor families receive monthly financial support. In 2007, CNN produced a documentary titled "Poverty in Bahrain", which was criticized by pro-government newspaper, Gulf Daily News. Al Jazeera produced a similar documentary in 2010.

== Foreign relations ==
Bahrain hosts the United States Naval Support Activity Bahrain, the home of the US Fifth Fleet; the US Department of Defense considers the location critical to its attempts to counter Iranian military power in the region. The Saudi Arabian government and other Gulf region governments strongly support the King of Bahrain. Although government officials and media often accuse the opposition of being influenced by Iran, a government-appointed commission found no evidence supporting the claim. Iran has historically claimed Bahrain as a province, but the claim was dropped after a UN survey in 1970 found that most Bahraini people preferred independence over Iranian control.
