= Mass media in Bahrain =

The mass media in Bahrain mainly consists of several weekly and daily newspapers, with the Information Affairs Authority controlling Bahrain's state-owned Bahrain Radio and Television Corporation, which broadcasts radio and television services. The media is predominantly in Arabic though English language and Malayalam newspapers are beginning to emerge in the country. The IAA also controls the Bahrain News Agency which monitors, originates and relays national and international news in Arabic and English, usually generating from 90 to 150 stories a day. Bahrain Telecommunication Company, trading as Batelco, is Bahrain's sole Internet service provider. In 2015, there were an estimated 1.29 million internet user, a penetration of 96.4%.

Most of the press is privately owned and is not subject to censorship as long as it refrains from criticizing the ruling family. Al Wasat newspaper and the Bahrain Mirror are regarded as the country's opposition news sources.

== Television ==
The country's television is state-owned and controlled by the Information Affairs Authority, which operates over five terrestrial TV networks.

An opposition news station, LuaLua TV operates from London, though it is blocked in the country.

== Radio ==
Like the country's television services, it is primarily state-run, under the Bahrain Radio and Television Corporation; services are usually in Arabic. Radio Bahrain is also in English. In addition, 'Your FM' is an Indian language radio station primarily serving listeners from the Indian sub continent.

== Newspapers ==
The country's first newspaper was the Newspaper of Bahrain (Arabic: جريدة البحرين) weekly newspaper which was first published in the 1940s. Another weekly newspaper, Sada al-Usbu' (Arabic: صدى الأسبوع, literally "Weekly echo"), came into publication in 1969. A third weekly newspaper, Al Mujtama al-Jadid (Arabic: المجتمع الجديد) came into publication in 1970. In 1971, when the country declared independence, there was a minimal presence of print media in the country. However in 1976, the country's first daily newspaper and arguably one of the principal, Akhbar Al Khaleej (Arabic: أخبار الخليج) was published in Arabic by the Akhbar al Khaleej Press company. In 1979, a sister English-language newspaper was started, called Gulf Daily News. In 1989, the Al Ayam (Arabic: الأيام) was launched. These three newspapers are considered the principal papers of the country. By the 1990s, there were more than 45 publications in print, which also included company-sponsored newspapers like the Bahrain Petroleum Company's Akhbar paper.

Due to the huge malayali population in the Persian Gulf region four malayalam newspapers also have editions from Bahrain. Gulf Madhyamam started publication in Bahrain in 1999. Malayala Manorama and Chandrika are also published from Bahrain. Another malayalam newspaper Gulf Thejas was launched in Bahrain on 27 September 2012 by Akhbar Al Khaleej editor-in-chief Anwar Abdulrahman at a ceremony held in Manama.

Below is a list of newspapers that currently operate in the country:

Title (Arabic title in parentheses)	Frequency	Type	Language	Publication city(ies)	Website	Year established	Editorial political affiliation
Akhbar Al Khaleej (أخبار الخليج)	daily		Arabic		aaknews.com	1976	Pro-government
Al Ayam (الأيام)	daily		Arabic		alayam.com	1989	Pro-government
Al Bilad (البلاد)	daily		Arabic		albiladpress.com		Pro-government
Al-Waqt ( الوقت)	stopped		Arabic		alwaqt.com	2006	Leftist nationalist
Al-Wasat ( الوسط)	stopped		Arabic	Manama	alwasatnews.com	2002	Independent, though considered an opposition newspaper.
Al-Watan ( الوطن)	daily		Arabic		alwatannews.net		Pro-government
Daily Tribune	daily		English			1997	Pro-government
Gulf Daily News	daily		English	Manama	gulf-daily-news.com	1979	Pro-government
Starvision News	Daily	Online/ Social Media	English		www.starvisionnews.com	2019	
Starvision News	Daily	Online/ Social Media	Arabic		arabic.starvisionnews.com	2022	
Starvision News	Daily	Online/ Social Media	Filipino		filipino.starvisionnews.com/	2022	
Starvision News	Daily	Online/ Social Media	Hindi		hindi.starvisionnews.com/	2020	
Starvision News	Daily	Online/ Social Media	Malayalam	-	ml.starvisionnews.com	2019	
Starvision News	Daily	Online/ Social Media	Kannada		kannada.starvisionnews.com/	2024	
Starvision News	Daily	Online/ Social Media	Tamil		tamil.starvisionnews.com/	2023	
Bahrain Vartha	Daily	Online/ Social Media	Malayalam		https://bahrainvartha.com/	2018	
Gulf Madhyamam	daily		Malayalam	-	madhyamam.com	1999	
Malayala Manorama	daily		Malayalam	-	gulf.manoramaonline.com		
4PM	daily		Malayalam	-	4pmnews.com	2012	
LocalBH	daily	Online/Social Media	English	Manama	localbh.com	2019	Pro-government

== See also ==
- Information Affairs Authority
- Culture of Bahrain
