= Fareed Ramadan =

Bahraini writer and film producer (1961–2020)

- فريد رمضان
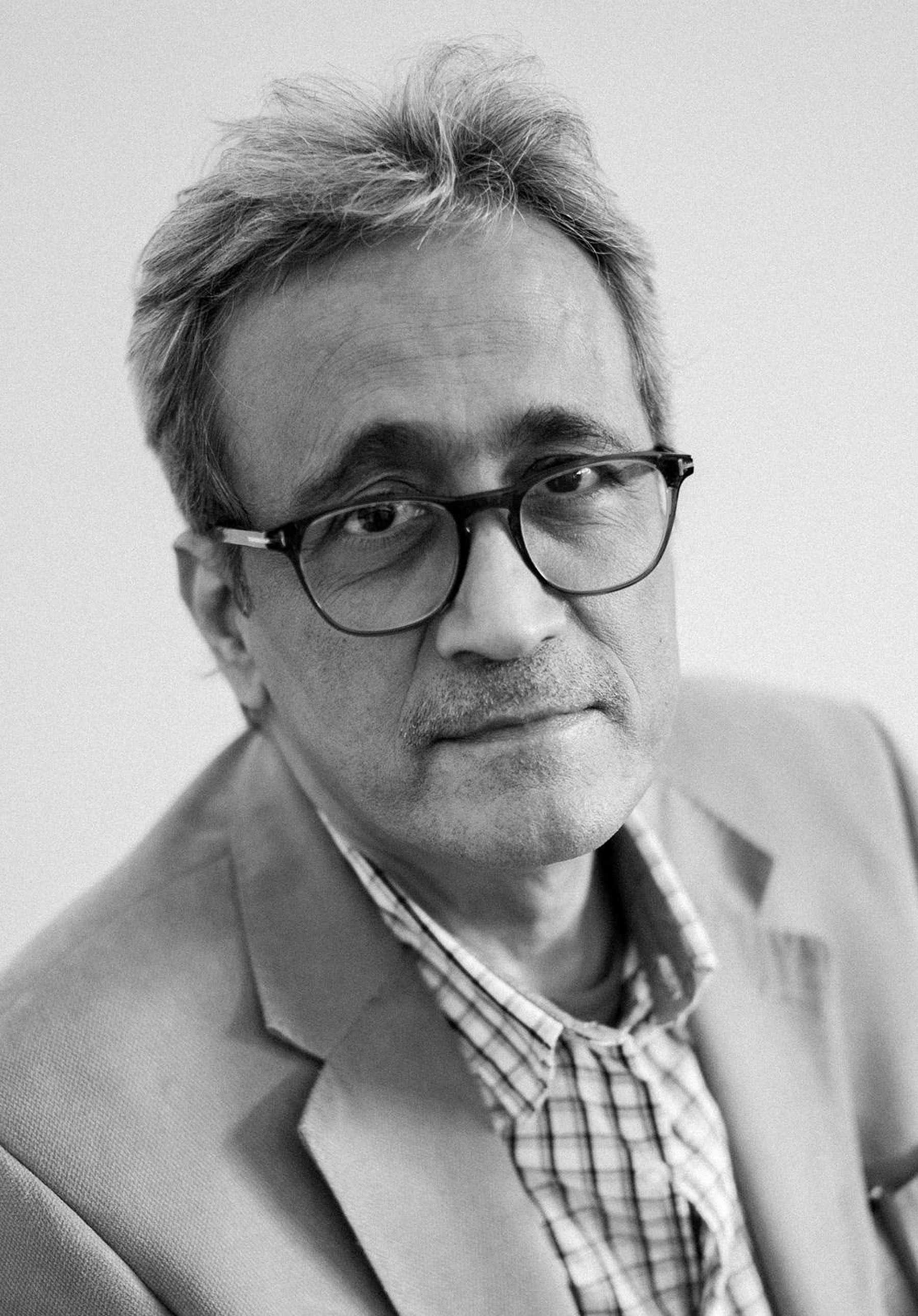
- Ramadan in 2020
- Born: November 4, 1961; Muharraq, Bahrain
- Died: November 6, 2020 (aged 59)
- Occupations: author, screenwriter, film producer
- Writing career
- Language: Arabic
- Notable works: The English Ocean, The Isthmus: A Wandering Star, The Sleeping Tree, A Bahraini Tale
- Website: elcinema.com/en/person/1106063

Fareed Ramadan (Arabic: فريد رمضان, November 4, 1961 – November 6, 2020) is a Bahraini novelist, screenwriter, and film producer. He is often considered one of the most prominent Gulf novelists and worked to deconstruct the discourse of racism through his work on cultural identities in Bahrain, to the point that some critics called him a "novelist of identities." Among his most prominent works are the novel The English Ocean and the screenplay of the film The Sleeping Tree.

Born on Muharraq Island, Ramadan published his first collection of stories in 1984, entitled البياض ("White"). He worked part-time from the time he was very young at the local newspapers, Al-Adwaa and Al Ayam. Later, he became the culture editor at other papers, Al-Watan and Al-Waqt, as well as the magazine, Hana Bahrain. He has written many screenplays for radio and television, and has also written commercials and documentaries. He has written both feature and short film scripts for many directors in Bahrain, the United Arab Emirates, Iraq, and Palestine. Ramadan and Bahraini director Mohammed Rashed Bu Ali founded their own studio, Nuran Pictures. His first novel, غيمة لباب البحرين ("A Cloud for Bab Al Bahrain"), was published in 1994 by Kalimat Books, owned by the Bahrain Writers' Association. His 2007 novel, السوافح؛ ماء النعيم ("Clematis: Water of Bliss"), won first prize in a national fiction award from the Ministry of Information. His work is marked by an interest in the issue of identity, particularly in light of the massive immigration to the Gulf in recent years and its accompanying socioeconomic changes.

== Biography ==
Ramadan was born the fifth of seven siblings to the second wife of a pearl diver father. After the discovery of oil in Bahrain in 1932, his father joined a rush of former divers to work for Bahrain Petroleum Company. Farid and his eldest sibling suffered congenital sickle cell-beta thalassemia, but he was able to complete his secondary school studies in literature at Al-Hidaya Al-Khalifia Boys' School in 1980. Afterward, he studied air traffic control at the Qatar Aeronautical College and then studied business administration at the Gulf College of Technology. Finally, he obtained a diploma in Computer Science and Business Administration from the Bournemouth Center for Computers and Technology in the United Kingdom and the Awal Institute in Bahrain.

In addition to working at the Ministry of Finance & National Economy, he worked part-time in the local press until 2003, when he devoted himself full-time to the journalism, literature, radio, television, and cinema. He participated in many forums and conferences, including one on "Photos from the Middle East" in Denmark in the wake of the Jyllands-Posten Muhammad cartoons controversy in 2005, and the PEN International Congress in Senegal in 2007. He attended the Cairo International Forum for Arab Fiction Creativity in 2005 and 2015, and participated in many Arab and international film festivals, sometimes as a judge.

== Works ==
=== Literature ===
- البياض ("White"), short stories, Bahrain, 1984
- تلك الصغيرة التي تشبهك – text ("The Little One That Looks Like You"), essays, Bahrain: Bahrain Writers' Association, 1991
- التنور...غيمة لباب البحرين ("Tannour: A Cloud for Bab Al Bahrain"), novel, Bahrain: Bahrain Writers' Association (1st ed.)/Manama: Masaa Publishing-Republished in Canada (2nd ed.), 1994 (1st ed.), 2014 (2nd ed.)
- نوران ("Nuran"), collaboration with plastic artist Jamal Abdul Rahim who signed 50 copies, Bahrain (1st ed.)/Cairo: Dar Sharqiyat (2nd ed.), 1995 (1st ed.), 1997 (2nd ed.)
- البرزخ...نجمة في سفر ("The Isthmus: A Wandering Star"), novel, Beirut:Arab Foundation for Research and Publishing (1st ed.)/Manama-Canada: Masaa (2nd ed.), 2000 (1st ed.), 2018 (2nd ed.)
- السوافح...ماء النعيم ("Clematis: Water of Bliss"), novel, Beirut:Arab Foundation for Research and Publishing (1st ed.)/Manama-Canada: Masaa (2nd ed.), 2006 (1st ed.), 2018 (2nd ed.)
- عطر أخير للعائلة ("The Last Fragrance for the Family"), incomplete memoir, Manama: Ministry of Information (1st ed.)/Manama: Dar Al Farasha (2nd ed.), 2008 (1st ed.), 2021 (2nd ed.)
- مسرحيات عربية ("Arabic Plays"), play collection written with leading Bahraini playwrights, Sharjah: Department of Culture, 2010
- رنين الموج ("The Ringing Waves"), collaboration with plastic artist Omar Al Rashid, Bahrain, 2012
- المحيط الإنجليزي ("The English Ocean"), novel, Beirut: Dar Soual, 2018

=== Television documentaries ===
- تاريخ الخيول العربية في البحرين ("History of Arabian horses in Bahrain")
- البحرين.. زهرة الخليج ("Bahrain: The Flower of the Gulf")
- صناعة السفن في البحرين ("Shipbuilding Industry in Bahrain")
- صناعة النسيج والفخار ("Textile and Pottery Industry")
- تاريخ القلاع في البحرين ("History of Castles in Bahrain")
- متحف البحرين ("Bahrain Museum")

=== Radio ===
- الغلام القتيل؛ طرفة بن العبد ("The Slain Boy Tarafa ibn al-'Abd"), dramatic radio series directed by Nabil al-Alawim, Bahrain Radio, 2004
- أعلام من الخليج العربي ("Luminaries of the Gulf"), joint Gulf Cooperation Council program containing profiles of famed individuals in Gulf media, 2006

=== Film ===
==== Feature films ====
- Za’er, screenplay, directed by Bassam Al-Thawadi, 2004, Dunia Productions
- A Bahraini Tale, screenplay, directed by Bassam Al-Thawadi, 2006, Bahrain Film Production Company
- The Sleeping Tree, story, directed by Mohammed Rashed Bu Ali, 2014, Nuran Pictures

==== Short films ====
- المسافات الدائرية ("Circular Distances"), directed by Yousef Malallah, 1986
- موت شاعر: تحية لخليل حاوي ("Death of a Poet: A Tribute to Khalil Hawi"), directed by Khaled Janahi, 1998
- الراية ("Ar-Rawa"), directed by Nizar Jawad, 2005
- البشارة ("Al-Bashara"), directed by Mohammed Rashed Bu Ali, 2009
- بالأمس ("Yesterday"), co-written with Hossam Tawfik and directed by Ammar al-Kooheji, 2009
- صولو ("Solo"), directed by Ali Al Jabri (Emirates), 2010
- سكون ("Sleep"), directed by Ammar al-Kooheji, 2012
- صبر الملح ("Patience of Salt"), directed by Mohamed Ibrahim, 2012
- شكوى ("Complaint"), directed by Imad Ali (Iraq), 2013
- زينب ("Zainab"), directed by Mohamed Ibrahim, 2014
- قوس قزح ("Rainbow"), directed by Mahmoud El Sheikh, 2014
- مكان خاص جدا ("A Very Special Place"), directed by Jamal al-Ghailan, 2014
- ترويدة ("Troy"), directed by Muhammad Ateeq, 2014

== Awards ==
- First Prize in Short Story Competition for الخسوف ("Eclipse"), Bahrain Supreme Council for Youth and Sports, 1983
- First Prize in Playwriting Competition for درب المصل ("Path of Serum"), Bahrain Ministry of Information, 2005
- First Prize in Novel Competition for السوافح...ماء النعيم, Bahrain Ministry of Information, 2007
- Second Prize in Playwriting Competition for الرهمة.. طق يا مطر طق ("Al-Rahmah…Knock, O Rain, Knock"), Bahrain Ministry of Information, 2007
- Short Film Production Grant for شكوى, Injaz Dubai, 2012
- Short Film Production Grant for زينب and مكان خاص جدا, Bahrain Film Production Company, 2012
- "Best Screenplay" Award for سكون, GCC Film Festival (Kuwait), 2013
- Short-List Nomination for IWC Filmmaker Award for الشجرة النائمة, Dubai International Film Festival, 2013
- Second Prize in Arab Cinema Horizons for الشجرة النائمة, Cairo International Film Festival, 2015
- "Best Screenplay" Award for قوس قزح, Wasit International Short Film Festival (Iraq), 2016
- Second Prize for الشجرة النائمة, GCC Film Festival (Abu Dhabi), 2016
- UAE Interior Ministry Award for "Best Social-Interest Screenplay" for خط تماس, at the 14th Dubai International Film Festival, 2017

== Death ==
In late 2020, his health began to worsen as sickler complications led to lung failure that hospitalized him several times. A day after the last of them, on November 6, 2020, he died due to steep oxygen and blood pressure loss and the consequent heart attack.

== Legacy ==
- Farid Ramadan Award for "Best Screenplay of a Gulf Feature Film": A new award introduced at the Al Ain International Film Festival's third edition on January 23, 2021, where he was featured in the "In Memoriam" segment.
- Farid Ramadan Scholarship: To be introduced for $1,000 with an endowment from Nuran Pictures at the first annual Bahrain Film Festival in April 2021.
