= List of newspapers in Bahrain =

The first local newspaper in Bahrain was Al Bahrayn which was published between 1939 and 1944.

Bahrain's Information Affairs Authority reported that the number of newspapers in 1999 was four which were published in Arabic and English languages. There were a total of 12 dailies and weeklies in the country in 2012.

Below is a list of the newspapers published in Bahrain.

| Title (Arabic title in parentheses) | Frequency | Type | Language | Publication city(ies) | Year established | Editorial political affiliation | Circulation |
|---|---|---|---|---|---|---|---|
| Akhbar Al Khaleej (أخبار الخليج) | daily | Newspaper (print, online) | Arabic | | 1976 | Pro-government, Arab Nationalist | |
| Al Ayam (الأيام) | daily | Newspaper (print, online) | Arabic | | 1989 | | |
| Al Bilad (البلاد) | daily | Newspaper (print, online) | Arabic | | 2008 | | |
| Al-Waqt (الوقت) | daily | CLOSED | Arabic | | 2006-2010 | | |
| Al-Wasat (الوسط) | daily | Newspaper (print, online) | Arabic | Manama | 2002 | | |
| Al-Watan (الوطن) | daily | Newspaper (print, online) | Arabic | | 2005 | | |
| Daily Tribune | daily | New Generation Newspaper | English | Manama | 2015 | | |
| Gulf Daily News | daily | Newspaper (print, online) | English | Manama | 1978 | | |
| Gulf Madhyamam | daily | Newspaper (print, online) | Malayalam | - | 1999 | | |
| Middle East Chandrika | daily | Newspaper (print, online) | Malayalam | - | 2007 | | |
| Malayala Manorama | daily | Newspaper (print, online) | Malayalam | - | 1888 | | |
| Gulf Thejas | daily | Newspaper (print, online) | Malayalam | - | 2012 | | |

== See also ==
- Media of Bahrain
- Culture of Bahrain
- Lists of newspapers
