= LGBTQ rights in Bahrain =

- Bahrain
- Legal status: Decriminalized since 1976
- Gender identity: Limited
- Military: No
- Discrimination protections: No

Family rights
- Recognition of relationships: No
- Adoption: No

Lesbian, gay, bisexual, transgender and queer (LGBTQ) people living in Bahrain face significant challenges and discrimination not experienced by non-LGBTQ residents. While same-sex sexual activity was decriminalised in 1976, laws against indecency remain and are used to target gender and sexual minorities. Offences under these provisions allow for sentences of imprisonment, fines and deportation.

Individuals are able to change their legal gender in a limited range of circumstances that are assessed as being in accordance with Islamic understandings of sex and gender as transmitted by Sunni fiqh. The state offers no protection from discrimination on the basis of sexual orientation, gender identity or expression, or sex characteristics. LGBTQ individuals face entrenched social stigma. Discussion of homosexuality has been permitted in Bahrain since the 1990s.

== Laws ==
=== History ===
Homosexual acts were first criminalised in Bahrain as "sodomy" while it was a protectorate of the British. Similar laws were imposed throughout the British Empire in nearly all of its colonies; these were mostly modelled on the original 1860 Section 377, introduced in India by the Raj.

=== Legality of same-sex sexual acts ===
A new Penal Code was enacted in March 1976, repealing the Penal Code of the Persian Gulf that was imposed by the British. The new penal code does not prohibit private, non-commercial acts of homosexuality between consenting adults; for the purposes of this law, "adults" are at least 21 years old.

Although no law explicitly criminalizes same-sex relations, authorities have used broadly-phrased penal code provisions against "indecency" and "immorality" or "debauchery" (Arabic: فجور, romanized: fujoor) to target these minorities.

The 2023 United States Department of State's report said:

The law did not criminalize same-sex sexual conduct between consenting adults. It prescribed fines, imprisonment, deportation, or a combination thereof for persons engaging in "debauchery" or "public indecency". The government used this provision against individuals suspected of being lesbian, gay, bisexual, transgender, queer, or intersex (LGBTQI+) or of" cross-dressing".

— Bahrain - United States Department of State, Acts of Violence, Criminalization, and Other Abuses Based on Sexual Orientation, Gender Identity or Expression, or Sex Characteristics

=== Interpretation ===
According to an article published by Al-Bilad in 2022, which discussed a recent debate in Bahrain about homosexuality, sparked by an incident where a private school mistakenly distributed material perceived as promoting it. This led to calls for stricter laws and investigations. The Bahraini law already criminalizes "debauchery" and prostitution, with penalties for incitement or promotion of such acts. Article 324 of the Bahraini Penal Code criminalizes inciting or assisting "debauchery" (fujur) or prostitution, which are defined as habitual immoral acts. This law applies to individuals who promote or facilitate such acts (a woman inviting others to commit. Homosexuality is implicitly associated with "debauchery", particularly in the case of men engaging in same-sex relations. However, the law does not explicitly define or address homosexuality as a distinct crime. Lawmakers argue that homosexuality isn't explicitly addressed, creating a "legislative gap." Lawyer Mahmood Rabe'a has pointed out that Article 324 of the Penal Code penalizes anyone who incites a man or a woman to commit debauchery or prostitution, or assists in this by any means, with imprisonment. He clarified that the interpretation of this article, according to jurisprudence and judiciary, stipulates that the crime of debauchery or prostitution is only realized through engaging in indecent acts with people indiscriminately and habitually, whether involving male or female prostitution. He added that when a woman commits indecent acts (Arabic: الفحشاء) and offers herself to anyone without distinction, this constitutes prostitution (Arabic: بغي), which is attributed to women and does not come from men. Its counterpart is debauchery (Arabic: فجور, romanized: fujoor), which is attributed to men when they offer themselves to other men indiscriminately and habitually.

Attempts have been made to enact harsher anti-LGBTQ laws; as of December 2024, none have gone through. A bill proposed by some members of parliament to amend the penal code in October 2021, included renaming one of its chapters "Debauchery, Prostitution, and Perversion", and the addition of two articles criminalizing "[raising] a flag, slogan, or any sign symbolizing homosexuals", "[promoting] the ideas and beliefs of homosexuals" and "[inviting, organizing or attending] any gathering or meeting of homosexuals", punishable by up to 5 years' imprisonment and a fine of 3,000-5,000 dinars. (Note: Proposed amendments to the law were described in a January 2022 article in Albilad: أعادت حادثة توزيع إحدى المدارس الخاصة قصة تروج الشذوذ الجنسي لطلابها - والتي ذكرت وزارة التربية والتعليم أنها تمت عن طريق الخطأ - قضية الشذوذ الجنسي إلى السطح، إذ رفع مجلس النواب في جلسته الاستثنائية الخميس الماضي مقترحًا برغبة بصفة الاستعجال بفتح تحقيق في هذه الحادثة. وفي رده على استفسار لـ "البلاد" حول معالجة القانون البحريني لفعل الترويج للشذوذ قال المحامي محمود ربيع إن المحرض على الجرم يعتبر مساهما مع الفاعل الأصلي في الجريمة متى أدى التحريض (الترويج) إلى ارتكاب الجريمة. وأشار إلى أن المشرع البحريني يُعاقب المساهم الجنائي أو المحرض بذات العقوبة المقررة للفاعل الأصلي، بمعنى إذا كانت عقوبة الفاعل الأصلي في جريمة القتل العمد هو السجن المؤبد أو الإعدام، فإن عقوبة المحرض على هذه الجريمة تكون ذات العقوبة؛ لأنه يعد شريكا في الجريمة من حرض على ارتكابها فوقعت بناء على هذا التحريض. ولفت إلى أنه على الجانب الآخر، لا يمنع أن يكون التحريض بحد ذاته جريمة، حتى وإن لم ينتج عنه أثر، وهو ما طبقه المشرع البحريني في جرائم معينة، كتلك الماسَّة بأمن الدولة الداخلي التي وردت تفصيلًا في الفصل الثاني من قانون العقوبات البحريني، إضافة إلى ما قرره المشرع في قانون حماية المجتمع من الأعمال الإرهابية المعدل، من عقوبة السجن للمحرض على على ارتكاب جريمة لغرض إرهابي حتى ولو لم يترتب على فعله أثر. الفجور والدعارة وأشار إلى أن قانون العقوبات عاقب في المادة 324 كل من حرض ذكرًا أو أنثى على ارتكاب الفجور والدعارة أو ساعده على ذلك بأي طريقة كانت بالحبس. وبين أن مفهوم دلالة نص هذه المادة حسب رأي الفقه والقضاء، أن جريمة الفجور والدعارة لا تتحقق بدورها إلا بمباشرة الفحشاء مع الناس بغير تمييز، وأن يكون ذلك على وجه الاعتياد سواء بالنسبة لبغاء الرجل أو بغاء الأنثى. وأضاف أن الأنثى حين ترتكب الفحشاء وتبيح عرضها لكل طالب بلا تمييز فتلك هي الدعارة، تنسب للبغي فلا تصدر إلا منها، ويقابلها الفجور، ينسب للرجل حين يبيح عرضه لغيره من الرجال بغير تمييز فلا يصدر إلا منه. ورأى أنه ينبغي تعديل النص بإضافة الشذوذ الجنسي الى جانب تجريم التحريض على الفجور والدعارة، لتغطية الفراغ التشريعي، مع ضرورة تعريف الشذوذ الجنسي تعريفا بنص صريح يُجرم الشذوذ الجنسي، ويوضح الفرق بينها وبين جريمتي الفجور والدعارة. وذكر أن مهمة القانون تنظيم العلاقات في المجتمع، وإذا ما ظهرت علاقة مؤثمة تتنافى مع قيم المجتمع وأخلاقه، فإن واجب السلطة التشريعية أن تتصدى لهذه الظاهرة الشاذة، وأن ينظم أمرها بتشريع عقابي وصولًا لاستئصالها. تعديل تشريعي ويأتي ذلك في وقت تقدم فيه نواب في أكتوبر الماضي باقتراح بقانون بتعديل بعض أحكام قانون العقوبات، في مادته الأولى بتعديل عنوان الفصل الثالث من الباب السابع من القسم الخاص من قانون العقوبات ليكون "الفجور والدعارة والشذوذ". ونص التعديل على إضافة مادتين تنص الأولى على "يعاقب بالسجن مدة لا تجاوز 5 سنوات والغرامة التي لا تقل عن 3 آلاف دينار ولا تجاوز 5 آلاف دينار أو بإحدى هاتين العقوبتين": 1- كل من رفع علما أو شعارا أو أية إشارة ترمز إلى فئة الشواذ جنسيا. 2- كل من روج بأية وسيلة كانت لأفكار ومعتقدات فئة الشواذ جنسيا. 3- كل من دعا أو نظم أو حضر أي تجمع أو اجتماع لفئة الشواذ جنسيا. ونص التعديل الثاني على أن "يعاقب الشخص الاعتباري بالغرامة التي لا تقل عن 10 آلاف دينار ولا تزيد على خمسين ألف دينار، إذا ارتكبت إحدى الأفعال المذكورة في المادة السابقة، وكان ذلك نتيجة اتفاق أو علم أعضاء مجلس الإدارة أو أصحاب المؤسسة أو مالكها. وفي حالة الحكم بالإدانة تأمر المحكمة بحرمان الشخص الاعتباري من المشاركة في المشروعات العامة أو بإغلاق مقاره التي وقعت فيها الجريمة أو بحله وإغلاق جميع مقاره إغلاقا مؤقتا أو دائما وتأمر المحكمة في جميع الأحوال بمصادرة الأموال والأمتعة والأدوات والأوراق مما يكون قد استعمل أو أعد للاستعمال في ارتكاب الجريمة أو تحصل منها، وذلك مع عدم المساس بحقوق غير الحسن النية. Translation: The incident of a private school distributing materials allegedly promoting homosexuality to its students — which the Ministry of Education claimed happened by mistake — has brought the issue of homosexuality back to the forefront. Last Thursday, the Parliament in its exceptional session proposed an urgent investigation into the matter. Responding to an inquiry by "Al-Bilad" about how Bahraini law addresses the act of promoting homosexuality, lawyer Mahmoud Rabie stated that inciting a crime is considered contributing to the offense, making the inciter equally culpable with the primary perpetrator if the incitement (promotion) leads to the commission of the crime. He pointed out that Bahraini legislators punish criminal accomplices or inciters with the same penalty prescribed for the primary perpetrator. For example, if the penalty for premeditated murder is life imprisonment or death, the inciter would face the same penalty as they are deemed a partner in the crime if their incitement caused it to occur. Additionally, he noted that incitement can be a crime in itself, even if it does not lead to any tangible outcome. Bahraini legislators have applied this principle to specific crimes, such as those endangering state security detailed in the second chapter of the Penal Code, as well as in the amended Law on Protecting Society from Terrorist Acts, which imposes imprisonment on anyone inciting a crime for terrorist purposes, even if their actions have no effect. Debauchery and Prostitution The Penal Code in Article 324 punishes anyone who incites a man or woman to commit debauchery or prostitution or assists them in any way with imprisonment. According to legal and judicial interpretation, the crime of debauchery and prostitution only occurs through engaging in immoral acts indiscriminately and habitually, whether it involves male or female prostitution. The lawyer added that a woman committing immoral acts indiscriminately is considered prostitution, attributed solely to her, while debauchery is attributed to a man offering himself to other men indiscriminately. He argued for amending the law to include homosexuality alongside debauchery and prostitution to address legislative gaps. The amendment should explicitly define homosexuality and differentiate it from the crimes of debauchery and prostitution. He emphasized that the law's role is to regulate relationships within society. If a prohibited relationship emerges, conflicting with societal values and morals, it becomes the legislature's duty to confront the phenomenon and regulate it with punitive legislation to eliminate it. Legislative Amendment In October, MPs proposed amending the Penal Code's provisions, including renaming Chapter Three of Part Seven to "Debauchery, Prostitution, and Homosexuality." The amendment introduces two articles, the first stipulating imprisonment for no more than five years and fines between 3,000 and 5,000 Bahraini Dinars (or either penalty) for: 1- Raising a flag, symbol, or sign representing homosexuality. 2- Promoting homosexual ideas or beliefs by any means. 3- Organizing, calling for, or attending homosexual gatherings or meetings. The second article imposes a fine between 10,000 and 50,000 Bahraini Dinars on legal entities if such acts are committed under their authority or with the knowledge of their managers, owners, or board members. If convicted, the court may ban the entity from public projects, close the premises where the crime occurred, or dissolve the entity entirely, with temporary or permanent closures of all its offices. The court will also order the confiscation of funds, equipment, tools, or documents used or intended for use in committing the crime, without affecting the rights of third parties acting in good faith.) The term used in the bill to refer to homosexuals is the derogatory Al-shawadh Jinsian (Arabic: الشواذ جنسيا).

=== Relationship law ===
For Bahraini Muslim citizens, marriage is defined and otherwise regulated by the National Personal Status Law (2017), which does not recognize same-sex marriages.

According to an interview conducted in 2023 by Ibraheem Al-Nahham for Al-Bilad Newspaper; a pro-government newspaper, Bahraini lawyer Fareed Ghazi (member of "liberal party" Economists Bloc and Al Muntada liberal think tank) stated that Bahraini law criminalizes same-sex relationships outside the framework of traditional Islamic marriage. Ghazi cited religious beliefs and cultural practices as the basis for these legal restrictions, arguing that they are consistent with the country's cultural norms, further stating that any talk about homosexuality in the Kingdom of Bahrain is a violation of Islamic law and the customs and traditions of Bahraini society (referring to the US embassy which celebrates pride month each year). The interview did not address the existence of homosexual individuals in Bahrain or the scientific perspectives on homosexuality. The LGBTQ community in Bahrain is often spoken about from a negative religious "Islamic" perspective. This reflects a broader pattern in some Islamic societies, where new scientific and technological developments, such as the internet, have faced resistance or controversy.

=== Related penal code provisions ===
- Article 324 of the penal code prohibits enticing another person to commit prostitution or "fojoor" or "fujoor". This translates to 'immorality' and seems to have vagueness in terms of its legal definition. It has increasingly been used to crack down on men who wear women's clothing in public.
- Articles 325–327 involve forcing of others to become prostitutes.
- Article 328 of the penal code prohibits running a place for prostitution or fojoor.
- Article 329 of the penal code prohibits people from public solicitation involving prostitution or fujoor.
- Article 330 of the penal code states that anyone who is charged with an act of prostitution or fujoor is to be taken to a hospital and tested for sexually transmitted diseases. If they have such diseases, the law stipulates that they be relocated to a medical facility for treatment.
- Article No. 350 of the Penal Code of Decree Law No. 15 of 1976 prohibits any sort of public indecency. The punishment for those “imitating the opposite sex” can reach up to a year in prison with 100 BHD fines. This could pose serious risks for any individual who does not fit with societal norms and expectations (appearance wise).
- Article 354 of the penal code prohibits cursing or using words or signs on a street or other public place for the purposes of indulging in immoral behaviour.

Penalties for convictions under the morality or indecency provisions are prison sentences ranging from 3 months to 2 years, fines of up to 200 Bahraini dinars, deportation for non-Bahrainis, or a combination.

Articles 324, 329 and 350 can be used against homosexuals, transgender people, or any other Queer individuals, as any citizen acting in a way deemed contrary to Islamic morality may be arrested. For example: a local same-sex couple showing affection in public; someone owning a rainbow flag; or even declaring one's own homosexuality, could all be considered public immorality and promoting "fujoor".

== Gender identity and expression ==
=== Gender change recognition ===
In 2017, the United States Department of State described processes for gender change recognition in Bahrain this way:

On rare occasions, courts approved the issuance of new legal documents for those who have undergone gender reassignment surgeries. On 23 November, the courts denied a citizen who underwent gender reassignment surgery the right to change his name and identity documents to match his sex; the case was still pending final appeal before the Court of Cassation as at year's end.

The State Department's 2023 report said:

Courts permitted individuals to change their gender identity markers on legal and identifying national documents to bring them into alignment with their gender identity (as male or female). Individuals had to provide medical documentation of a "sex change operation" or medical necessity. Nonbinary, intersex, or gender nonconforming options were not available.

Two such "rare cases" in the 2000s were those of individuals designated female at birth who identified as male. One, having undergone a genital reconstruction surgery, was reported by the Gulf Daily News in 2006 as going to court in a bid to have his status as a man recognised in law. The legal case progressed through the Bahraini legal system until 2008, when the court granted the motion to allow the transgender man to change his legal documents and be recognised as male. The man's lawyer had earlier won a landmark 2005 case where a transgender Bahraini had undergone sex-confirming surgery and was legally recognised as a man. In both cases, the individuals concerned, although raised as females, were intersex or had some degree of genital or reproductive organ ambiguity.

In 2023, Bahraini courts gave a ruling, in rejecting a transgender man's application, that access to sex reassignment medical procedures was against Islamic law in cases considered to be solely related to gender dysphoria; only individuals with some degree of intersex biological traits should be eligible for gender-confirming procedures, and thereafter legal recognition of gender change.

== Government policies and actions ==
The Al-Menbar Islamic Society is one of the more successful political factions within the Parliament, it has pushed for more conservative social policies, including a crackdown on LGBTQ people.

In response to questions from parliament about lesbianism in schools, the Assistant Under-Secretary for Educational Services Khalid Al Alawi has said that the Education Ministry is not responsible for addressing issues of sexuality, and instead it is the responsibility of parents to take care of their children's emotional development, and that "The public shouldn't make a big deal out of this problem because it does not exist." Also, he said " ... the students are facing ... [the] category of educational problems, not immoral acts. If a student's appearance is contrary to custom and the school's values, then ... those violating the school's rules should be disciplined."

In 2008, a harsher crackdown on same-sex sexual acts was called for by members of the Al Menbar parliamentary bloc. The government was asked to conduct an official study into the problem of same-sex sexual acts and how to best combat them. The initial response from the government was:

- The Interior Minister says that "suspected" (effeminate) homosexuals are banned from entering Bahrain by checks at the airport.
- The Interior Minister says that many male homosexuals choose a profession in hairdressing salons and beauty and massage spas, which the Minister says are often inspected.

Other pending bills would expressly ban LGBTQ foreigners from entering the kingdom or receiving residency permits as well as plans to instruct children's teachers in apparent warning signs of homosexuality or cross-dressing, so that the children can be punished.

In September 2013, it was announced that all Gulf Cooperative Countries had agreed to discuss a proposal to establish some form of, yet unknown, testing in order to ban gay foreigners from entering any of the countries. However, it has been suggested that concern for hosting 2022 FIFA World Cup in Qatar, and fears for controversy in a case that football fans would have been screened, made officials backtrack the plans and insist that it was a mere proposal.

In 2018, during its participation in the meeting of the Democracy and Human Rights Committee, the Parliamentary Division of the Kingdom of Bahrain objected to the re-raising of the issue "regarding the role of parliaments in ending discrimination based on sexual orientation, and respecting the rights of gays, bisexuals, transgender people, and intersex persons". The deputy d. Jamila al-Sammak, a member of the Parliamentary Division, said that "this proposal contradicts the natural composition of life, which consists of a man and a woman, just as all monotheistic religions, foremost among which the Islamic religion, have prohibited homosexuality and considered it a departure from the natural scope and the proper formation of life. Therefore, the Division believes that it is necessary to respect the privacy of societies in that matter."

In June 2021, the US Embassy and members of the US Navy base in Bahrain, celebrated Pride Month by raising the rainbow flag and posting about it on social media, prompting the state's Bahrain News Agency (BNA) and all local newspapers to publish several articles in Arabic condemning homosexuality, homosexuals, and even the US embassy.

On December 6, 2021, the Shura Council of Bahrain publicly reinforced the country's conservative stance on sexual orientation and gender identity by declaring that homosexuality is contrary to human values and religious principles. This statement aligns with Bahrain's legal framework, which emphasizes personal freedoms while prohibiting behaviours considered immoral, as outlined in the Constitution and the National Action Charter. As a result, LGBTQ individuals in Bahrain face significant legal and social challenges due to these entrenched attitudes and regulations.

On February 14, 2024, the Ministry of Education in Bahrain decided to refer the administration of a private school and its entire board of directors to investigation. The directive also included the dismissal of the private school's general manager. This decision came in light of a controversial video in which several students performed a scene that included suggestive gestures. The scene depicted students enjoying themselves, with two male students pretending to propose to each other in class while other students cheered and had fun. The girl who recorded the video belongs to the Achomi ethnic minority, whose roots are from Kuhij. Her family is well-known and respected in Bahrain. The social reaction from the community was overwhelmingly negative and deemed disproportionate. The incident sparked a significant debate on social media and other platforms, raising questions about cultural norms, societal reactions, and the treatment of minority groups in Bahrain.

== Living conditions ==
=== Derogatory terminology ===
Arabic publications in Bahrain and the majority of Arabic-speaking Islamic countries, including laws, commonly refer to homosexuality and homosexuals as:

- Shudhudh (Arabic: شذوذ) or Shudhudh Jinsi (Arabic: شذوذ جنسي): used to refer to sexual paraphilias respectively. This is intentionally done to link homosexuals to pedophiles and other paraphilias.
- Shadh Jinsian (Arabic: شاذ جنسيا – singular), Shawadh Jinsian (Arabic: شواذ جنسيا – plural): meaning sexual paraphilic(s).
- Shadh (Arabic: شاذ – singular), and Shawadh (Arabic: شواذ – plural): meaning paraphilic(s), pervert(s) or deviant(s).

These terms denote "sexual paraphilia, perversion or deviation" such as pedophilia; when used to refer to "homosexuals" they have derogatory and dehumanizing connotations. Other derogatory terms include:

- Lewat (Arabic: لواط)- equivalent to "sodomy", in reference to the Biblical and Quranic figure Lot.
- Luti (Arabic: لوطي) – equivalent to "sodomite."

In contrast, non-derogatory terms are available, like:

- Mithleyya Jinsia (Arabic: مثلية جنسية) which exclusively means homosexuality.
- Mithley-yeen (Arabic: مثليين) which exclusively means homosexuals.
- Mithley (Arabic: مثلي) which means gay.
- Mithleya (Arabic: مثلية) which means lesbian.

=== Incidents and enforcement ===
A government crackdown against cross-dressing appears to have begun a year after the 2008 call by members of the Al Menbar parliamentary bloc for harsher action on same-sex behaviour. In 2009, two Asian foreigners were sentenced to six months in jail, with hard labour and later deportation, for offering to have sex with undercover police offices in exchange for money at a male barbershop. In February 2009, a 39-year-old man was sentenced to a month in jail for wearing women's clothing in public, namely an abaya and purse.

In 2011, police raided a party that was described in the press as a same-sex wedding ceremony.

=== False accusations ===
Sometimes false accusations of homosexuality, or anti-gay innuendos, are levied against critics of the Bahraini government in an effort to discredit political or sectarian dissent. In a society where being gay is widely perceived as a vice or bad habit, accusing people of being gay, even in jest, can be an effective means of bullying reformers.

Human rights advocate Nabeel Rajab has been subjected to such accusations by people on social media. Similar insults have been launched at Sheikh Ali Salman, with some Twitter users referring to his Shia political party as "Al Wefag".

Similarly, false accusations were circulated about the 2011 pro-democracy protesters gathered in Pearl Square. Participants of the protests were accused of engaging in all sorts of sexual immorality in an effort to discredit the protesters' demands.

== Public opinion and media coverage ==
According to the World Values Survey in 2011, 42% of Bahraini people believed that "homosexuality is never justified", which was lower than the world average of 48% who agreed with that statement. It was also more accepting than any other Arab countries surveyed. The same survey found that 18% of Bahraini people "would not like to have homosexuals as neighbours" which was among the lowest percentage in the world.

Some of the more liberal and left-aligned lawful political groups within Bahrain have expressed opposition to introducing Sharia law into the Bahraini penal code, but none have expressed support for LGBTQ rights.

In June 2021, the United States Embassy in Bahrain faced public criticism following its decision to raise the rainbow flag in recognition of LGBTQ Pride Month. In Bahrain, as in other Gulf states, homosexuality remains a highly sensitive and controversial subject. The flag's display prompted members of the Bahraini National Assembly to issue a statement condemning the act, describing it as a "provocative action".

In December 2021, the President of the Bahraini Educators Union, Safia Shamsan, described the statement of the Supreme Council for Islamic Affairs and its support for the statement of Al-Azhar as "a right stance that we all support". And she explained that "what is constant in the laws of the earth is the common sense that Allah instilled in us and that is reinforced and protected by the heavenly religions". Shamsan claimed that it is "important to stand against the issue of alshudhudh aljinsi [homosexuality] and preventing its promotion through a systematic and fraudulent media".

In the same year, Ma'an (Arabic: معاً), a Bahraini human rights organization, issued an article on BNA in Arabic titled "We support the statement of the Islamic Supreme Council and call for respect for Islamic and societal values", calling for "protection of society from all manifestations of Shudhudh (sexual deviance) and attacks on Islamic and societal principles and values." BNA and the local Bahraini newspapers accused Qatar of "promoting homosexuality" in the then upcoming FIFA World Cup.

In June 2022, coinciding with pride month again, the US Embassy raised a rainbow flag and celebrated pride on their social media accounts, which instigated BNA and all local government allied newspapers (including Al-Ayam; a self-identified liberal newspaper) to publish several articles (in Arabic) condemning, attacking homosexuals (and labeling them as "Shawadh" lit: 'paraphilic', 'perverted' or 'deviants'), and attacking the US Embassy itself, and claiming that "all religions" are against homosexuality, in addition to pseudoscientific Anti-Gay propaganda by saying no one is born gay and portraying monkeypox as a "Gay Plague". In contrast, while a Sunni woman who accused Shia Muslims of being responsible for the spread of COVID-19 was arrested, hate speech against the LGBTQ+ community remains widespread, with no legal consequences for those who engage in such rhetoric. This is partly due to Bahrain's Article 309, which protects religious groups but does not extend similar protections to the LGBTQ+ community.

On November 15, 2022, a Bahraini YouTube talk show Speaker bh hosted an episode about homosexuals titled "Arabic: الشذوذ الجنسي ( المثليين ), lit. 'Sexual deviance (homosexuals)'" where the episode featured two hosts, محمد القطان, 'Mohammed Al-Qattan', and سمر الزرقاوي, 'Samar Al-Zarqawi' who used mockery and slang expressions while discussing the topic, saying:

انه اوه قي هاهاها عادي، لا لا لا مو عادي مو حرية شخصية ما يصير، يعني احنا في مجتمع اسلامي، هاي ضد الفطرة، احنا تربينا على مبدأ الفطرة مثلاً الريال لازم يتزوج و اييب عيال و كذا و كذا ما يصير

[That it's like, 'Oh, Gay, haha, it's normal.' No, no, no, it's not normal. It's not personal freedom; it can't be. I mean, we live in an Islamic society. This goes against human nature. We were raised on the principle of natural order. For example, a man must marry, have children, and so on. It can't be like this.]

The co-host herself does not abide by Islamic dress code. The host was criticised in the comments for hosting what they called an "effeminate" known as "جوزيف, 'Joseph'" a popular Bahraini snapchat persona in the Arab Gulf state. Media content in Bahrain is subject to government oversight, with only content aligning with state-approved narratives being permitted for publication.

Similarly, in June 2023, Salah Al-Jodar, a columnist for Al-Ayam newspaper, published an article strongly condemning the promotion of LGBTQ+ rights in Bahrain. He criticized what he described as Western moral decline, linking issues such as family disintegration, divorce, and homelessness to the acceptance of homosexuality. Al-Jodar argued that Western societies, having lost touch with traditional values, are "attempting to export these ideas to the Arab world under the guise of personal freedom" (despite the fact that homosexuality existed in the Middle East before modern gay rights). Al-Jodar's article was written in response to the US Embassy in Bahrain's public support for LGBTQ+ rights during Pride Month. He expressed disapproval of the embassy's actions, stating that such behavior disrespects Bahrain's customs, traditions, and religious values. He claimed that Bahraini society firmly rejects homosexuality, which he referred to as shawadh ('deviant'), and maintained that all religions and societal norms oppose such behaviours. Al-Jodar's rhetoric mirrors common arguments in Bahrain, where LGBTQ+ identities are frequently portrayed as foreign to the country's social fabric and religious principles. His views also reflect broader societal attitudes in Bahrain, where public expressions of support for LGBTQ+ rights often face significant backlash, particularly from conservative and religious groups. Despite growing awareness of LGBTQ+ issues globally, public opinion in Bahrain remains largely hostile, with social media platforms often serving as outlets for criticism against LGBTQ+ rights, especially during Pride Month.

In September 2023, Sonya Janahi, a member of the Bahrain Chamber of Commerce and Industry and part of Bahrain's Ajam community, spoke at the Arab Chambers Union meeting in Manama. During the meeting, Janahi voiced her opposition to the acceptance of homosexuality, stating that it conflicts with Islamic and societal values. She urged regional governments to form a unified stance on this issue, particularly within the Arab Labour Organization. Janahi pointed out that discussions on sexual orientation and gender identity had led to divisions during the organization's financial committee meetings. Despite efforts to resolve these disagreements, she noted that many Arab governments continue to resist incorporating issues related to homosexuality into official discussions. Janahi further mentioned that around 50% of the member countries in the Arab League oppose homosexuality.

In February 2024, Ibrahim Al-Nahham, a Bahraini journalist working for Al-Bilad, published an article titled "Homosexuality and the Sinister Plot" (المثلية الجنسية والمخطط الآثم), expressing conservative attitudes towards LGBTQ individuals. Al-Nahham strongly condemned homosexuality, labelling it as a threat to the country's moral fabric, religious values, and family structure. He expressed concerns about global media "promoting same-sex relationships", arguing that such portrayals undermine traditional Arab-Islamic values and encourage what he described as "deviant" behaviours. The article called for the Bahraini parliament to take firm action by criminalizing homosexual acts and same-sex marriage to safeguard societal norms and protect future generations. This perspective aligns with the broader public sentiment in Bahrain, where homosexuality is widely viewed as incompatible with the country's cultural and religious foundations.

The caricature by Tariq Al-Bahhar

On August 3, 2024, the newspaper Albilad posted an illustration drawn by caricature artist Tariq Al-Bahhar on their website and on Instagram depicting a roll of toilet paper with the colours of the Gay pride flag, accompanied by the caption "المكان الصحيح" ('the correct place'). The caricature, which was widely viewed and commented on, reflects the prevailing negative attitudes towards the LGBTQ+ community in Bahrain. Such content reinforces societal stigmas and hostility, contributing to the broader atmosphere of intolerance that LGBTQ+ individuals face in the country. Public expressions like this are emblematic of the broader conservative and religious sentiments that shape attitudes toward LGBTQ+ rights in the region.

== Free speech and association ==
The press in Bahrain has, since the 1990s, generally been allowed to discuss the subject of homosexuality, without being punished by the government. Initially, the discussion was focused on people and events happening outside of Bahrain, especially in the field of entertainment or the AIDS-HIV pandemic. In the early part of the twenty-first century, the Bahraini press has begun to address sexual orientation, gender identity, and the AIDS-HIV pandemic as they apply to the island.

In 2001, the Arabic language newspaper Al-Meethaq created a national controversy when it became the first newspaper to discuss homosexuality in Bahrain.

On 21 December 2005, the Bahrain-based newspaper Gulf Daily News' British columnist Les Horton wrote a commentary. This is probably the first time that a column expressing support for LGBTQ rights was published in a Bahraini newspaper, albeit an English language publication.

Bahraini citizens who criticize or denigrate Islamic scripture, including advocating for a more permissive interpretation, can be imprisoned for up to one year. An unidentified female Bahraini citizen who mocked Islamic scripture on Twitter, was reported by people and this got her subsequently arrested. The Gulf Daily News has continued to write articles that touch upon homosexuality and gender identity. For example, it has published several articles on Bahraini female homosexuality in girls' high schools and Bahraini women who claim to have become lesbians based on abusive relationships with men.

Human Rights Watch, the international non-governmental organisation, has identified legal and social barriers to the formation of community groups or associations for support or promotion of LGBTQ rights in Bahrain. The government body that controls the registration of associations and private foundations may deny registration to any organisation if it judges that its aims are contrary to morality or the maintenance of public order, or if "society does not need its services". The US Department of State reports there are no approved LGBTQ-related organisations and deems it unlikely they could form, or "openly convene events publicly supportive of the LGBTQI+ community" in the face of currently prevailing societal norms. ILGA concludes that given the social and legal context, it is "improbable that an organisation working on sexual and gender diversity issues would be registered".

== Human rights reports ==
In 2017, the United States Department of State reported the following, concerning the status of LGBTQ rights in Bahrain:

The law does not criminalize same-sex sexual activity between consenting persons who are at least age 21, but discrimination based on sexual orientation or gender identity occurred.

The 2023 Country Human Rights report from the US Department of State said:

The law did not criminalize same-sex sexual conduct between consenting adults. It prescribed fines, imprisonment, deportation, or a combination thereof for persons engaging in "debauchery" or "public indecency". The government used this provision against individuals suspected of being lesbian, gay, bisexual, transgender, queer, or intersex (LGBTQI+) or of "cross-dressing".

== Summary table ==
Same-sex sexual activity legal	Yes (Since 1976)
Equal age of consent (21)	Yes (Since 1976)
Anti-discrimination laws in employment	No
Anti-discrimination laws in the provision of goods and services	No
Anti-discrimination laws in all other areas (incl. indirect discrimination, hate speech)	No
Same-sex marriages	No
Recognition of same-sex couples	No
Step-child adoption by same-sex couples	No Adoption is not legally available to anyone, regardless of sex or orientation, in accordance with traditional interpretations of Islamic law regarding family relationships
Joint adoption by same-sex couples	No Adoption not legal for anyone of whatever sex or sexual orientation
Gays, lesbians and bisexuals allowed to serve openly in the military	No
Right to change legal gender	Yes / No Very limited. Court-ordered, long legal processes involved
Conversion therapy made illegal	No
Access to IVF for lesbians	No Fertility treatments using donor sperm or ova are unavailable to any person. Only a woman and a man married to each other have access to assisted reproduction
Commercial surrogacy for gay male couples	No Gestational surrogacy is not legal, regardless of sex or orientation
Conversion therapy banned	No
MSM allowed to donate blood	Yes (No specific laws against it)

== See also ==
- Criminalisation of homosexuality
- Human rights in Bahrain
- LGBT rights in the Middle East
- LGBT rights in Asia
