= Al Qafilah =

Bahraini weekly newspaper (1952–1956)

- Type: Weekly
- Founder: Ali bin Abdullah Sayyar
- Editor: Ali bin Abdullah Sayyar
- Founded: 1952
- Ceased publication: 1956
- Language: Arabic
- Headquarters: Manama, Bahrain

Al Qafilah (Arabic: The Qaravan) was a weekly newspaper published in Manama, Bahrain, between 1952 and 1956.

== History and profile ==
Al Qafilah was founded by progressive Arab nationalists, including Ali Sayyar, one of the members of the High Executive Committee (HEC; al-Hay'a al-Tanfidhiyya al-Uliya) which was a cross-sectarian nationalist political movement. He was also the editor of the paper and its successor, Al Watan. The secretary of the HEC, Abdul Rahman Al Bakir, was one of the editorial members of Al Qafilah.

The paper was not subject to any censorship until 3 October 1953 when it featured articles on the recent riots in the country. It praised the abolition of the monarchy in Egypt in 1952 and supported the Iranian Prime Minister Mohammad Mosaddegh when he was overthrown in the 1953 Iranian coup d'état. The paper's constant target was the Bahrain Petroleum Company (BAPCO) which was run by foreigners. Together with the nationalist magazine Sawt al-Bahrain the company was labelled as Tyrannical BAPCO, a small state, and the colonialist company. The publication of an advertisement of the Egyptian musical Khadd al Jami in June 1953 caused controversy due to its appearance in Ramadan.

Following the riots at the end of 1954 the newspaper published its last issue on 26 November and was closed by the Bahraini authorities in December 1954. The same year the monthly magazine Sawt al-Bahrain was also closed, and the advisor of the king, Charles Belgrave, reported the reason for these closures as their "offensive remarks about neighbouring friendly states."

From 1955 the paper was published under title Al Watan for one year and ceased publication in 1956.

Al Qafilah managed to sold four thousand and five thousand copies during its lifetime.
