= Al-Bilad =

Al-Bilad is the name of

- Al Bilad (Bahraini newspaper)
- Al-Bilad (Saudi newspaper)
- Al-Bilad (Palestinian newspaper)
- Al Bilad Bank, a bank in Saudi Arabia
- Al-Bilad, Yemen, a village in Yemen
