= Radio in Bahrain =

Radio broadcasting started in Bahrain in 1940 by the British as a war-measure. Regular radio broadcasting, in Arabic, first started in 1955. By 1980, the radio service broadcast up to 14 hours a day. The country's first English language radio station started in 1977, as a result of an increase in English speakers in Bahrain and the Persian Gulf region. The radio's programs were primarily religious and educational, with occasional news announcements.

Almost all radio stations in Bahrain are state-owned, by the Bahrain Radio and Television Corporation. However, Radio Mirchi 104.2 FM is a privately owned radio station broadcasting in Hindi/Malayalam, to serve the country's Indian community.

== History ==
The British established the Bahrain Broadcasting Station in November 1940 in response to the initiation of pro-Nazi programmes being broadcast in Arabic in the Persian Gulf from 1934 to 1945. One of the earliest studies done on radio use in Bahrain assert that in 1940, there were 511 radio receivers in operation. However, radio ownership was not common among the residents, and most people went to cafés to listen to broadcasts. The station was staffed mostly with Bahrainis and its broadcasts included Quranic recitations, the national anthems of Kuwait and Bahrain, and poetry recitations, which may have been in the form of music. The station was closed down in 1945.

Radio Bahrain was established in 1955. The Bahrain Radio and Television Corporation (BRTC), a state-owned entity, was set up in 1971, and runs Radio Bahrain as well as Bahrain TV. BRTC became an independent body in January 1993. Its radio broadcasts are usually in Arabic and also in English. The English-language radio service has been on-air since 1977, broadcasting four hours a day from a studio in Isa Town. In 1982 the station was moved to a building in Adliya. On-air time was extended to 18 hours a day. A second station, Radio 2, began broadcasting 6 hours a day. In 1989 a new studio was established in the Ministry of Information building, and the following year the station went 24 hours. In 2007, Radio Bahrain switched its frequency from 101.0FM to 99.5FM. The Information Affairs Authority was formed in 2010 and, besides other functions, controls BRTC.

BRTC granted the license for the first Indian radio station in 2006 to the strategic Publicity and advertising agency headed by P. Unnikrishnan. Voice FM 104.2 began operations on 1st November 2006 as a full-time Malayalam radio station, later adding Hindi programs as well.

In addition, 'Your FM' is an Indian language radio station primarily serving listeners from the Indian sub continent.

== List of stations ==
- 87.6FM Radio Suno Malayalam
- 89.2FM Plus FM
- 91.4FM Energy Radio 1 KSA
- 91.9FM Panorama FM
- 93.3FM Radio Bahrain Khaliji
- 95.0FM Radio Bahrain Traditional
- 96.5FM Radio 1 Bahrain English
- 99.5FM Radio 2 Bahrain English
- 99.1FM BFBS Bahrain
- 100.0FM Rotana FM
- 100.1FM Radio Sawa
- 101.0FM BBC World Service
- 101.4FM Energy Radio 2 KSA
- 101.9FM MBC FM
- 102.3FM Radio Bahrain Arabic
- 103.5FM Al-Arabiya News
- 106.1FM Radio Bahrain Holy Quran (Religious)
- 106.3FM AFN Bahrain (American Forces Network)
- 107.2FM Live FM (Bahrain's only Asian Radio Station)

== See also ==
- Media in Bahrain
- Television in Bahrain
- Information Affairs Authority
