= Saving Hope (book) =

Saving Hope: The Long Way to the Arab Spring
- Author: Nader Kadhim
- Original title: إنقاذ الأمل: الطريق الطويل إلى الربيع العربي
- Cover artist: Mohammed al-Nabhan
- Language: Arabic
- Genre: Non-fiction
- Published: 2013 (Masaa Publishing & Distribution)
- Publication place: Bahrain
- Pages: 314
- ISBN: 9789995870157

Saving Hope: The Long Way to the Arab Spring (Arabic: إنقاذ الأمل: الطريق الطويل إلى الربيع العربي) is a 2013 non-fiction book by Bahraini cultural critic Nader Kadhim. Written in Arabic, it is the ninth book by Kadhim, who works as a Professor of Cultural Studies at the University of Bahrain. Written in two stages, before and during the Arab Spring, the book discusses this wave of protests from two sides; the past and the future. The past is divided into three waves, each of them corresponding to an era of hope and aspiration. First is the enlightenment wave, followed by the revolutionary wave and finally the democratic wave. The author then tackles the Arab Spring and argues that it is not the time for celebration, but an important station in the long way towards democracy.

The book was positively received by reviewers in several Bahraini media outlets such as Al-Wasat, Al Ayam and al-Bilad. In addition, the pan-Arab Al-Hayat and Kuwaiti Al Rai newspapers gave it favorable reviews. There were mild criticisms for the book, mainly concerned with its scope. Every critic thought it should have expanded more on a certain aspect.

== Background ==
The Arab Spring was a wave of protests, uprisings and revolutions that erupted at the end of 2010 and beginning of 2011. Starting from the Tunisian city of Sidi Bouzid and spreading throughout the country, the Tunisian Revolution began in mid-December 2010 and was soon faced with government repression. On 14 January 2011, President Zine El Abidine Ben Ali fled to Saudi Arabia. Inspired by the events, the Egyptians organized similar protests on 25 January, which also swelled and spread all over the country. After several failed attempts to stop the movement, President Hosni Mubarak announced his resignation and transferred power to the army on 11 February. These events "jolted the rest of the region" and several other Arab countries were quick to follow suit.

In Yemen, small-scale protests started shortly after the Tunisian Revolution. Protesters were emboldened by the fall of Mubarak and their numbers grew. The president, Ali Abdullah Saleh was able to remain in power for months before signing an agreement in November by which he handed over power, but remained a political player. In Bahrain, protests erupted on 14 February and were met by repression. A month later, the government called in troops from neighboring Persian Gulf countries to put down protests and announced a state of emergency. In Libya, protests started on 17 February in the eastern city of Benghazi. They developed into a civil war that has claimed the lives of tens of thousands. In September, six months after the UN Security Council–sanctioned NATO military intervention, the de facto ruler Muammar Gaddafi was toppled and killed.

In Syria, protests erupted in mid-March and were met by government repression. The brutal repression radicalized the opposition and the country slid into full scale civil war that has left more than 100,000 killed by July 2013. Less significant protests also occurred in Algeria, Jordan, Morocco, Oman and Saudi Arabia. The initial hopes of democratic change have faced several setbacks in Syria, Yemen, Libya, Bahrain, Egypt and Tunisia. A report by Freedom House in 2012 suggested that while Tunisia was showing significant improvements, Egypt's improvements were limited and there were declines in some areas. Bahrain on the other hand was scoring record declines and was ranked lowest. The situation in Yemen was not much better than Bahrain.

== Inspiration and writing ==
Kadhim began writing the book in December 2010, a time he described as gloomy with no hope of change in the Arab World. Then, when the Arab Spring began, he was deeply shaken by the rapid developments and the early victories achieved in Tunisia and Egypt, and described them as "a rain that fell suddenly on a barren desert". Therefore, he decided to stop writing and rethink the book's thesis, which until then had been influenced by the previous gloomy atmosphere. The stop was only expected to last for few months or a year at most until the events unfolded. But Kadhim only resumed writing in September 2012, a time when some countries were still in upheaval, while others were in transition. He was determined and motivated to re-examine the original thesis, to defend the Arab Spring, and most importantly to defend "the hope that this Spring had revived".

== Content ==
The book discusses the Arab Spring from two sides: the past and the future. The author argues that the Arab Spring was a result of a past which extends to the nineteenth century, which he names the "memory of hope". He then divides this long period into three eras: enlightenment wave of hope, revolutionary wave of hope and democratic wave of hope. Each of these waves is then discussed in detail.

=== The enlightenment wave of hope ===
This wave started at the beginning of the nineteenth century. It was characterized by the hope that al-Nahda (Arab Renaissance) and enlightenment would allow the region catch up with more developed nations. Although they differed in ideology and worldview, the common theme among the enlightenment intellectuals was their belief in gradual progress without sudden leaps even if it takes decades. They did not support violence or revolution, but preferred peaceful methods such as education and science to bring about change. Most of them saw the Western world as a model to follow and imitate; some even called for full Europeanization. Another shared theme was their attempt to explain the backwardness of the Arab world and the progress of the Western world by one grand cause, each of them claiming to have found this cause. Despite the long time-frame and successive generations of this wave, the author concludes that it failed to achieve its goals.

=== The revolutionary wave of hope ===
This wave started in the middle of the twentieth century and was characterized by the hope to achieve al-Nahda via rapid radical changes. Its theorists criticized the previous gradual approach as futile. They thought that the Arab world was held back from progress by two major forces: foreign colonialism and local tyranny. Thus, they supported national liberation movements and revolutions. To them, revolution was the only way to overcome the backwardness of the Arab world. The Western world was no more a model to follow, instead Third World counties that resisted imperialism such as Vietnam and Cuba became the models.

Following the defeat of Arab armies in the 1948 Palestine war, the Arab world went into an era of political assassinations and military coups that culminated in the Egyptian Revolution of 1952, which brought Gamal Abdel Nasser into the leadership of Egypt. Nasser's ascend to power was a turning point in the history of the region and the revolutionary wave had spread to Algeria, Bahrain, Iraq, Yemen and Libya. This wave however faced a historic defeat in the 1967 Arab–Israeli War. The author states that this defeat was worse than that of 1948 and had signaled the end of the Nasserite revolutionary wave, which was replaced by the Islamist wave. This wave reached its climax in early 1980s after the Islamic Revolution in Iran and Soviet invasion of Afghanistan, which turned Afghanistan into a hub for Mujahideen. The Arab revolutions that succeeded did not bring al-Nadha nor freedom, instead they had turned into authoritarian regimes. These developments and the 8-year Iran–Iraq War have struck a fatal blow to the Arab revolutionary wave of hope.

=== The democratic wave of hope ===
This wave began at the end of the 1980s after the Revolutions of 1989. Its main theme was the hope that civil society, not enlightenment or revolution would pave the way for democracy in the Arab world. Civil society was seen as essential for emergence of democracy and that once a strong civil society developed, democracy was sure to follow. It was hoped that democracy would be achieved by the end of 1990s or early twenty-first century at most. The Saddam Hussein-ordered Iraqi invasion of Kuwait in 1990 and the subsequent Gulf War have formed a strong reaction against tyranny, which was seen as the main cause of the crisis. It also weakened authoritarian regimes and gave civil society more space to maneuver. The number of non-governmental organizations in the Arab world jumped from less than 20,000 in the mid-1960s to over 70,000 in the late 1980s to 300,000 in 2008. Despite all of these developments, there was no significant democratic change in any Arab state throughout this period.

=== The beginning of Arab Spring ===
In this chapter, the author argues that the grand narrative of democratic change was being weakened and replaced by small narratives of quality of life and personal consumption of commodities and services. Arab states used these narratives to polish their tarnished legitimacy. However, these small narratives were not sustainable. Dissatisfaction and despair were very high. This situation was ready to explode at any moment and was ignited by Mohamed Bouazizi's self-immolation. Although the Arab Spring began with great hopes for change, these hopes were replaced by fear and then by frustration. Setbacks such as the struggle between Islamists and seculars, 2012 Benghazi attack and Reactions to Innocence of Muslims have diminished much of the initial hope.

The author concludes by arguing that change is hard and that one should not rush to think that the Arab Spring is the "time of festival". Instead the author blames this rush and exaggerated expectations for the diminishing of hope. He adds that although the way forward is long and hard (the events of early 2011 being an important station in it), we should hold on to the hope rescued by the Arab Spring and believe that a better future can be built by our own hands.

== Characters ==
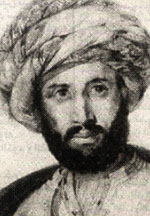
Rifa'a al-Tahtawi, the pioneer of the enlightenment wave of hope

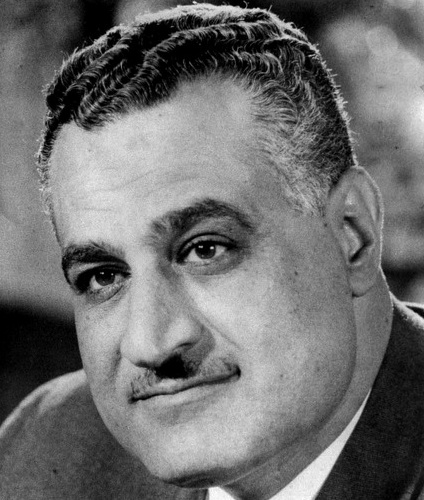
Gamal Abdel Nasser was a main figure in the revolutionary wave of hope

For each wave, the author cites a number of characters as its thinkers and intellectuals.

The enlightenment wave of hope:

- Rifa'a al-Tahtawi (1801–1873)
- Butrus al-Bustani (1819–1883)
- Hayreddin Pasha (1820–1890)
- Jamal ad-Din al-Afghani (1838–1897)
- Abd al-Rahman al-Kawakibi (1855–1902)
- Muhammad Abduh (1849–1905)
- Shibli Shumayal (1860–1917)
- Qasim Amin (1863–1908)
- Shakib Arslan (1869–1946)
- Ahmed Lutfi el-Sayed (1872–1963)
- Farah Antun (1874–1922)
- Salama Moussa (1887–1958)
- Ali Abdel Raziq (1888–1966)
- Taha Hussein (1889–1973)

The revolutionary wave of hope:

- Sati' al-Husri (1882–1968)
- Muhammad Naguib (1901–1984)
- Ruhollah Khomeini (1902–1989)
- Abul A'la Maududi (1903–1979)
- Sayyid Qutb (1906–1966)
- Ahmad Shukeiri (1908–1980)
- Constantin Zureiq (1909–2000)
- Michel Aflaq (1910–1989)
- Abul Hasan Ali Hasani Nadwi (1914–1999)
- Gamal Abdel Nasser (1918–1970)
- Anwar Sadat (1918–1981)
- Salahuddin al-Munjid (1920–2010)
- Mohamed Hassanein Heikal (b. 1923)
- Frantz Fanon (1925–1961)
- Nadeem al-Baitar (b. 1925)
- Yasin al-Hafiz (1930–1978)
- Sadiq Jalal al-Azm (b. 1934)
- Mahdi Amel (1936–1987)
- Abdullah Yusuf Azzam (1941–1989)

The democratic wave of hope:

- Khair el-din Haseeb (b. 1929)
- Al-Habib Jinhani (b. 1934)
- Mohammed Abed al-Jabri (1936–2010)
- Saad Eddin Ibrahim (b. 1938)
- Khaldoon al-Naqib (1941–2011)
- Wajih Kawtharani (b. 1941)
- Al-Taher Labib (b. 1942)
- Ali al-Kanz (b. 1946)
- Elias Khoury (b. 1948)
- Mohamed El-Sayed Said (1950–2009)
- Azmi Bishara (b. 1956)
- Amani kandil
- Larbi Sadiki
- Abdennour Benantar
- Baqir al-Najjar

== Release and reception ==
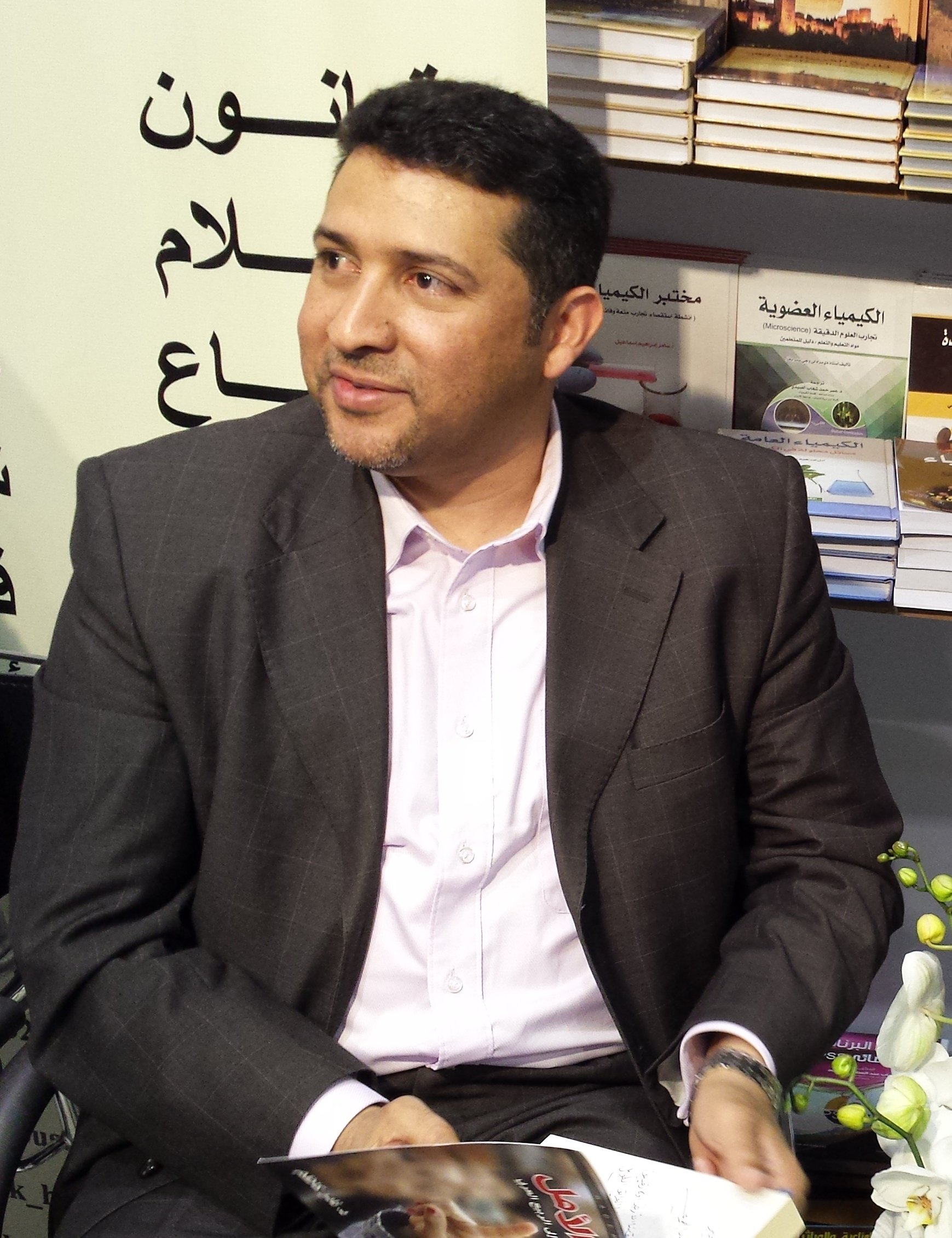
Nader Kadhim signing a copy of the book in the 2014 Bahrain Book Fair

Saving Hope was published by Masaa Publishing & Distribution in Bahrain and Kuwait in 2013, with the subtitle, The Long Way to the Arab Spring. Unlike Kadhim's three previous books, which were published gradually as articles in the media, no parts of Saving Hope were published before the official release. The cover of the 314 pages book showed a Tunisian woman waving the V sign. The book has received favorable reviews in various media outlets.

Writing for Al-Wasat, Mohammed Jalal praised the book's title and subtitle saying they reflected positiveness and reality. He also stated that Saving Hope was Kadhim's most important book so far. Writing for the same newspaper, Habib Haidar expressed his admire to the large amount of sources Kadhim used and was able to plot in a homogeneous way that is easy to read. He also noted that two thirds of the book were dedicated to the "memory of hope" and only 100 pages discussed the Arab Spring.

Hassan Madan reviewed the book in 5 articles published in Al Ayam. He considered it the first Bahraini attempt to analyze the roots of the Arab Spring. He noted that throughout the book, the author had argued against Lyotard's proposal by stating that local narratives had reached an impasse. While praising his division of the "memory of hope", Madan thought that Kadhim should have expanded more about the divisions between the first and the second wave and should have explored more about Marxist parties in the Arab world. Writing for the same newspaper, Mahir Abdulqadir praised the thesis of the book, stating that unlike many of the superficial analysis of the Arab Spring, Kadhim succeeded in tackling and examining the Arabic subconscious while keeping the reader in suspense until the last pages. He however criticized the book for not covering the "West aggressive attitude to the [Arab] Renaissance".

One attendant of a cultural seminar about the book criticized it for lacking Islamic theorizing, while another described it as too optimistic. Overall comments were however positive. Writing for Al-Bilad newspaper, Mohammed al-Mahfodh stated that the book was well worth reading and stopping by. A review by Al-Hayat warned against judging the book from its optimistic cover image or title. It praised the book and described it as a "thoughtful and interesting study". Fahad al-Hindal praised the author's critical reading of the three waves of hope in a review published in Al Rai newspaper.
