= Khawla Matar =

Bahraini journalist

Khawla Matar (Arabic: خولة مطر) is a Bahraini journalist. She is the first Bahraini woman to edit a daily newspaper, Al-Waqt, and has been the director of the United Nations Information Centre (UNIC) in Cairo. Among other outlets, she has worked for the Associated Press, BBC News, and Asharq Al-Awsat.

== Education ==
Matar earned her high school diploma at the Khawla Secondary Girls School in 1974. She obtained her Bachelor of Arts in Media and Journalism at the University of Arkansas in 1981. At Durham University in Britain, she earned a Master of Arts in Media Sociology in 1987 and a Ph.D. in the same discipline in 1992.

== Career ==
- 1981-83: Editor/Correspondent, Al Khaleej, United Arab Emirates
- 1983-84: Editor/Correspondent, Editorial Page, Akhbar Al Khaleej, Bahrain
- 1984-87: Correspondent/Director of Photography, Gulf Regional Office, Associated Press
- 1987-89: Editor-in-Chief, Gulf Today Panorama Magazine, Bahrain
- 1989-91: Foreign Correspondent, Yemen/Djibouti/Lebanon/Bosnia and Herzegovina etc., LBC News
- 1991-93: Correspondent/Political Affairs Edictor, MBC
- 1993-95: Media Officer, Arab Council for Childhood and Development
- 1996-2005: Media Officer, Arab States Regional Office, International Labour Organization
- 2005-06: Editor-in-Chief, Al-Waqt
- 2006-09: Regional Expert on Declaration on Fundamental Principles and Rights at Work, International Labour Organization
- 2009–Present: Director, UNIC Cairo; in 2011, she helped draft a report on human rights in Tunisia for a high-ranking committee of the United Nations Human Rights Council
- 2012: Spokesperson, Special Envoy of the Secretary-General to Syria Lakhdar Brahimi
