= Television in Bahrain =

In Bahrain, there are seven free-to-air television channels, four of which are privately owned. The country's public service broadcaster, Bahrain Radio and Television Corporation (BRTC), broadcasts over five terrestrial TV networks, including the popular Channel 44. Around 35–40% of its output is locally produced. Free satellite is the dominant television platform, reaching 51% of Bahraini households. The country has a relatively high pay-TV penetration, estimated at 51% in 2011. There are three main pay-TV operators: OSN, ART and Al Jazeera Sports (beIN now). The government-controlled Information Affairs Authority directly controls BRTC and indirectly controls the country's other television networks.

Bahrain Sports is a national TV channel offering various sports events in Arabic. Al Maaref TV is a religious TV channel founded in 2007. An opposition news station, LuaLua TV operates from London, though it is blocked in Bahrain.

Television in Bahrain began in 1973, broadcasting five-hours per day.

Bahrain historically hosted a number of pan-Arab broadcasters, including Orbit, which merged to form the OSN, and the MBC2 channel. It also hosts the Alarab News Channel funded by Prince Al-Waleed bin Talal of Saudi Arabia that covers political, economic and social issues related to the Arab region.

== See also ==
- Media of Bahrain
- Radio in Bahrain
- Information Affairs Authority
