= Abdul Rahman Al Bakir =

Bahraini journalist and dissident (1917–1971)

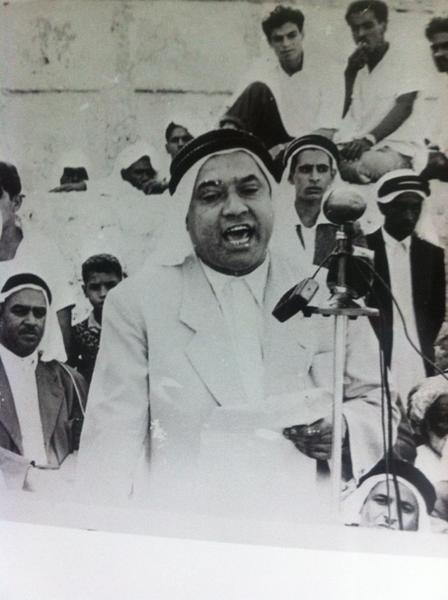
- Born: 1917; Manama, Bahrain
- Died: 8 July 1971 (aged 53–54); Beirut, Lebanon
- Resting place: Doha, Qatar
- Known for: Secretary of the National Union Committee

Abdul Rahman Al Bakir (Arabic: عبدالرحمن الباكر; 1917–1971) was a leading activist and one of the independence leaders in the Arab Gulf states in the 20th century. He was the founding member and secretary of the National Union Committee (NUC), a non-sectarian and pan-Arab independence group established in Bahrain in 1954.

== Early life ==
Al Bakir was born in Manama, Bahrain, in 1917. His family were Jews lived in Baghdad who later converted to Islam. The parents of Al Bakir were from Qatar. Al Bakir received a law degree from an Indian University.

== Activities and arrest ==
Al Bakir was employed at the Bahrain Petroleum Company in 1936 and then worked in Dubai, Qatar and in some African countries. During this period he also visited various regions, including Zanzibar, Kenya and East Africa where he observed the effects of the British colonial policies which were very different from those in the Gulf states. In the late 1940s he settled in Doha, Qatar, where he involved in ice business, but in 1952 he returned to Bahrain. He was given a Bahraini passport in 1948. In a meeting of the Bahraini political activists led by Al Bakir it was decided to launch a nationalist journal, Sawt al-Bahrain, which laid the basis of High Executive Committee. Al Bakir published articles in Sawt al-Bahrain using a pseudonym, Ibn Taymiyyah. One of his articles was about slavery in Islam. He joined the editorial team of the weekly newspaper Al Qafilah in 1952.

In 1954 Al Bakir and other progressive intellectuals established the High Executive Committee which would be later renamed the National Union Committee, and he was elected as its secretary. The authorities asked Al Bakir to leave the country after the start of the large-scale demonstrations in country, and he left Bahrain for Cairo where he stayed between the end of March and September 1956. In fact, the authorities ordered him to go to Lebanon.

Following the demonstrations in 1956 the Bahraini authorities arrested three founders of the NUC, namely Abdul Rahman Al Bakir, Abdulaziz Al Shamlan and Abdul Ali Aliwat, who were accused of attempting to assassinate the ruler, Salman bin Hamad Al Khalifa, three members of the ruling family, and Charles Belgrave, advisor of Salman on 6 November 1956. They were detained and sent to Jidda Island. After the trial they were sentenced to fourteen years in prison on 23 December 1956.

They were sent to exile into the island of Saint Helena on the orders of Salman bin Hamad on 27 January 1957. Al Bakir and others made an application to the Supreme Court of St Helena and to the Judicial Committee of the Privy Council to use the habeas corpus which was admitted. Although the Council rejected his petition in the early 1960, on 7 April their case was reopened which was also rejected. In June 1960 two Labor Party members of the House of Commons and some British newspapers, including The Guardian, began to call for the release of three NUC members claiming that the court did not impartially deal with the case. In the late 1950s the Labour Party members demanded that these three men should be released and not to be sent to Bahrain.

On 13 June 1961 Al Bakir, Al Shamlan and Aliwat were freed and went to London with their St Helena passports. Each of them was paid £15,000 for compensation and £5,000 for expenses.

== Later years ==
After his short stay in London Al Bakir settled in Beirut, Lebanon. There he published a book entitled min al-bahrain ila al-manfa~Sant Hilanah (Arabic: From Bahrain to Exile in 'Saint Helena') in 1965.

== Personal life and death ==
Al Bakir was married and had four children, two sons and two daughters. As of 2002 his wife and daughters were living in Qatar. One of his daughters married Jassim Buhejji, cofounder of the National Union Committee.

Al Bakir died in Beirut on 8 July 1971. His body was brought to Bahrain, but the Bahraini authorities did not allow his family to bury him there. Instead, he was buried in a cemetery in Doha, Qatar.
