= Nader Kadhim =

Bahraini writer, academic and cultural critic

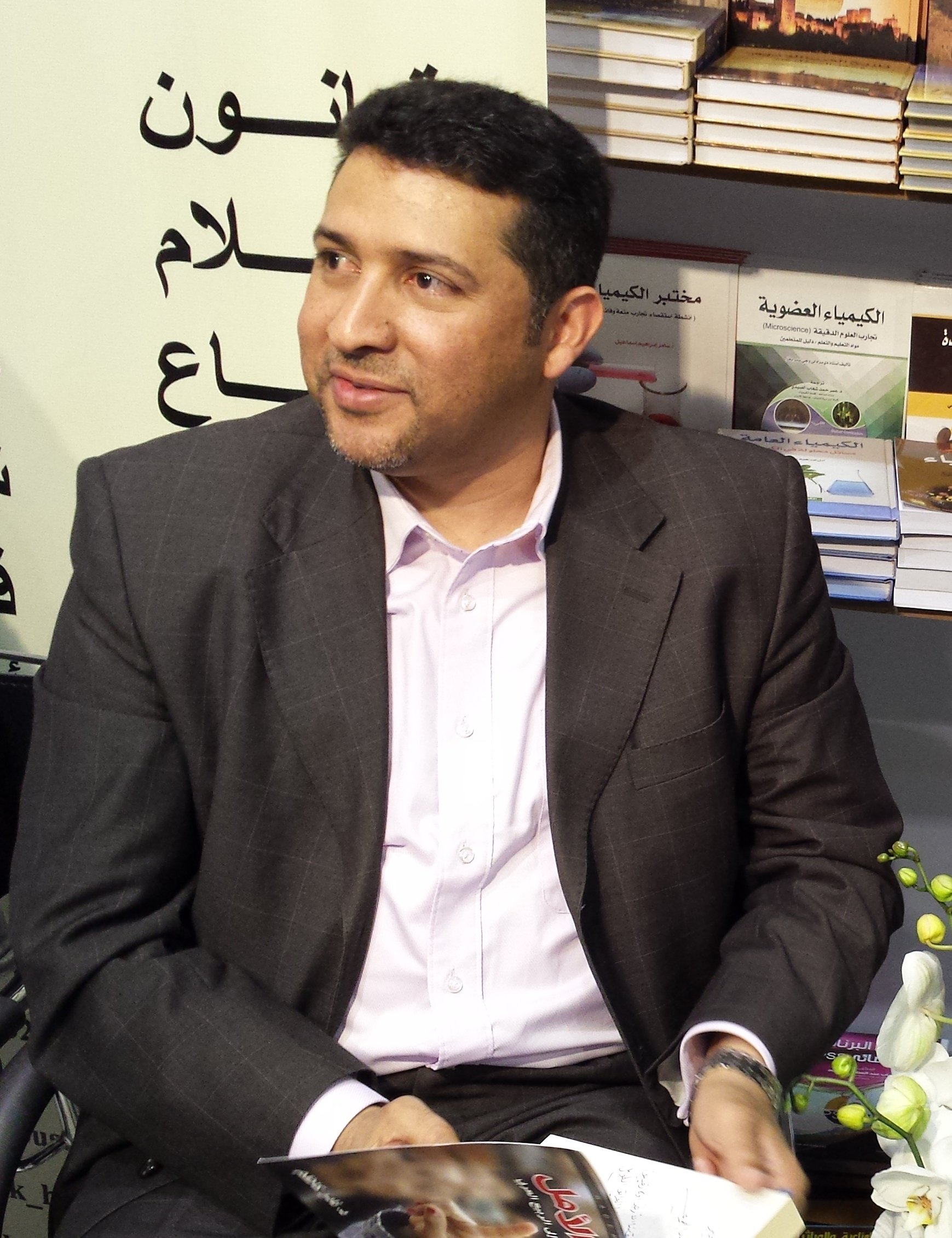
- Nader Kadhim at the 2014 Bahrain book fair
- Born: 1973 (age 52–53); Al Dair, Bahrain
- Education: PhD in Arabic literature (2003 from Institute of Arab Research and Studies); M.A. in Modern Criticism (2001 from University of Bahrain); B.A. in Arabic language and literature (1995 from University of Bahrain)
- Occupation: Professor of Cultural Studies at University of Bahrain
- Website: Twitter; Facebook instagram

Nader Hassan Ali Kadhim (Arabic: نادر حسن علي كاظم; born 1973) is a Bahraini writer, academic and cultural critic. He was a professor of Cultural Studies, University of Bahrain and a co-editor of Information and Communication Journal, issued by the International Centre for Media and Communication Studies in London.

== Early life and career ==
Born in the village of Al Dair in 1973, Kadhim completed his primary, intermediate and secondary education in government schools. He then enrolled in University of Bahrain where he earned a B.A. in Arabic language and literature in 1995 and Master's degree in Modern Criticism in 2001. Between 1995 and 2003 he worked as a part-time lecturer and research assistant in University of Bahrain and then as teacher in government schools. In 2003, he earned his PhD in Arabic literature from the Cairo-based Institute of Arab Research and Studies of the Arab League. He currently works as Professor of Cultural Studies at University of Bahrain. He is also the editor of two literature magazines published by the same university.

Although Kadhim was born to a Shia family, he sees it as no more than a historical coincidence which "does not entail anything". In an interview with Al-Waqt newspaper, he stated that joining college in 1991 was an important turn in his life which until then had been influenced by the Islamic revival in the early 1980s. Kadhim recalled that he took part in several religious activities in his childhood. He refused to be classified as Islamist, Shia Islamist or even Shia intellectual, but considered the Islamic faith and culture that he grew up with as a paving factor to his embracing of postmodernist ideas and distancing him from modernism. Since the early 1990s, Kadhim has shown increasing interest in the critical theory and cultural studies.

In February 2007, Kadhim was honored by Al-Wasat newspaper for his "contributions to the intellectual and cultural" debate in Bahrain. During the event, Mansoor al-Jamri, the editor-in-chief of Al-Wasat praised Kadhim for his anti-sectarian writings and said he was an exceptional writer. Several other academics and journalists praised him as well.

== Publications ==
Kadhim is author to many literature and cultural criticism articles and studies published in Bahraini Arabic media. He has published 16 books, two of them earning the "Bahraini outstanding book" award in 2003 and 2004 and the Gulf creative persons’ literary achievements Medal in the field of studies and intellectual production from Gulf Cooperation Council (GCC)

Title	Translated title	Year	Publisher	ISBN
المقامات والتلقي	Maqamat and Reception	2003	Ies & Ministry of Information of Bahrain	9953-36-050-2
عبد الله الغذامى و الممارسة النقدية و الثقافية	Abdulla al-Ghathami and the Cultural Critical Practice	2003	Institute of Arab Research and Studies & Ministry of Information of Bahrain	9953-36-001-4
تمثيلات الآخر	Representations of the Other	2004	Institute of Arab Research and Studies & Ministry of Information of Bahrain	9953-36-149-5
الهوية والسرد	Identity and Narrative	2006	Ibrahim bin Mohammed Al Khalifa institute for culture and research	9953368791 9789953368795
طبائع الاستملاك	Natures of Acquisition	2007	Institute of Arab Research and Studies & Ministry of Information of Bahrain	99901-90-56-9
استعمالات الذاكرة	Uses of Memory	2008	Fakhrawi bookshop	9789990153620
خارج الجماعة	Outside the Group	2009	Al Ayam Foundation for Press, Printing and Publishing	9789990194579 9990194572
كراهيات منفلتة	Unbridled Hatreds	2010	Arab Scientific Publishers, Inc.	9786140100602 6140100607
إنقاذ الأمل	Saving Hope	2013	Masaa Publishing & Distribution	9789995870157
لا أحد ينام في المنامة	No one Sleeps in Manama: History, Place and People.	2019	Dar Sual Publishing	
الشيخ والتنوير	The Sheikh and Enlightenment	2021	Dar Sual Publishing	
Manama: The City That Never Sleeps	Manama: The City That Never Sleeps	2021	Dar Sual Publishing	
تاريخ الأشياء" عن الشارع، والمقبرة واشياء أخرى	History of Things: On the Street, the Cemetery, and Other	2021	Dar Sual Publishing	
أمة لا اسم لها: من بناء الأمة إلى تفكّكها	A Nation That Has No Name	2022	Dar Sual Publishing	
بانيان البحرين: التاريخ، والتجار، والدين، والحياة المدنية	Banyan of Bahrain: History, Trade, Religion and Civic Life	(in press)	Dar Sual Publishing	
ما الأمة؟ مختارات مرجعية عن الأمة والقومية	What is the nation? Reference anthologies on the nation and nationalism	(in press)	Takween Publishing	
Africanism: Blacks in the Medieval Arab Imaginary	Africanism: Blacks in the Medieval Arab Imaginary	(expected to be published on September 15, 2023)	McGill-Queen's University Press.	
