= Aqeel al-Mosawi =

Bahraini dentist and novelist

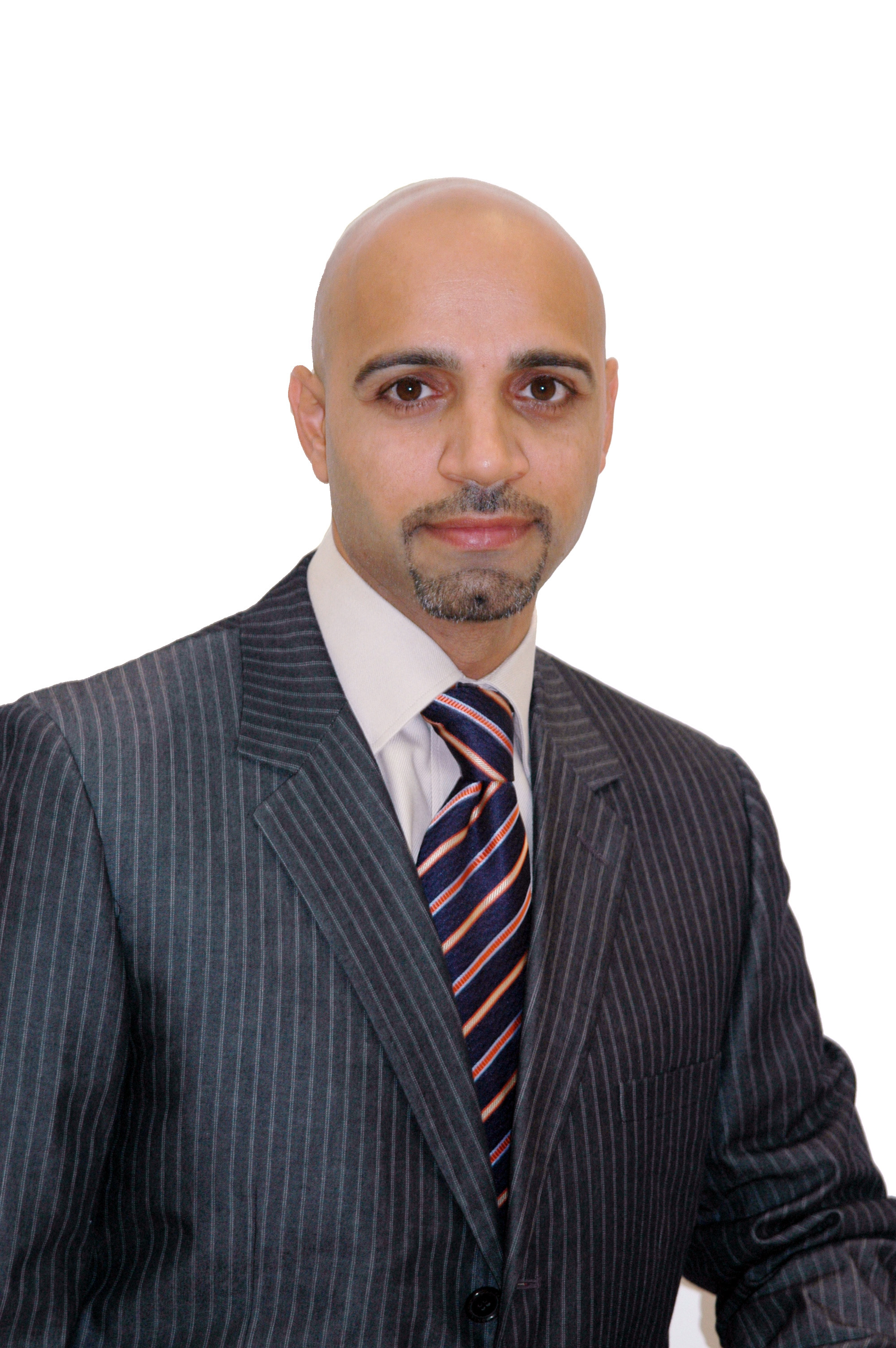
- Aqeel al-Mosawi
- Born: January 27, 1966 (age 60); Bahrain
- Education: University of Baghdad (BDS); University of Minnesota (MS Endodontics)
- Occupations: Endodontist and novelist
- Spouses: Maha Al Abbas (m. 1993; div. 2001) Amani Al Tawwash (m. 2015)
- Writing career
- Language: Arabic

Aqeel Mohamed Saleh al-Mosawi (Arabic: عقيل محمد صالح الموسوي; born 27 January 1966) is a Bahraini novelist, photographer and consultant endodontist.

== Early life and career ==
Aqeel al-Mosawi was born in Noaim neighborhood, one of the neighborhoods of Bahrain's capital Manama. His father, Sayyid Mohamed Saleh al-Mosawi, was a Shia religious figure, poet and writer. Painter Abbas al-Mosawi is his brother.

After graduating with a dental degree from the University of Baghdad in 1989, al-Mosawi worked for Bahrain's Ministry of Health. In 1997, he received a master's degree from the University of Minnesota in the field of endodontics. Two years later he established his own private practice, where he still works (as of November 2020). He often participates in dental conferences and exhibitions such as AEEDC Dubai and DLS Bahrain.

al-Mosawi is an avid traveler and keeps a wall-size map of the world in his practice where he marks places he visited. According to him, he has "seen half of the world". His wife Amani Al Tawwash, an artist, is his travel companion. He often documents his travels with photographs and blogs. In 2004, al-Mosawi organized a photo exhibition about Palestinian refugees in Lebanon. The photos were taken by children.

== Aryamehr Nameh ==
Aryamehr Nameh: Biography of the Light of the Aryans (Arabic:أريامهر نامه: سيرة نور الآريين), is a historical novel published by Dar Al Farabi (Beirut). It was well received by critics and was nominated for the International Prize for Arabic Fiction. The idea of the book came as a result of the author's visits to Iran and his fascination with its culture and literature such as Hafez, Ferdowsi and Shirazi. Initially, al-Mosawi was planning to write a long article, or a series of articles as he had done about India, but the material he was researching kept growing. Writing a book seemed to be the natural path to follow, but his friend and writer Nader Kadhim convinced his to write a novel instead. al-Mosawi was influenced by the novels of Amin Maalouf (his favorite author) and the Shahnameh epic. The author said that throughout the novel, he was very faithful to actual history (which he considers sacred), and only voiced his opinions through fictional characters which can be distinguished from the real ones easily. He wrote about the role of Freemasonry in the events, but he recognizes that our knowledge of their role does not stand on firm historical evidence.

Because Iran is a polarizing topic, with opinions varying between absolutes, al-Mosawi said he did not want to impose his views on the reader, especially since the events in question are complicated. Instead he opted to make each character present and defend their own point of view, and began the novel with a quote for Rumi denying the existence of absolute good or evil. This choice, according to the author had made the novel equally liked by both Islamists and Pahlavi sympathizers.

One goal of the novel was to highlight and rehabilitate the Achaemenid Empire, which German philosopher Hegel viewed as the beginning of human consciousness, and to cast Alexander the Great in a negative light; as an invader rather than great conqueror as often viewed in western literature. The author also sought to contrast the Arab Spring with Mohammad Mosaddegh's national movement in Iran which he considered an "Iranian Spring". The 360-page novel is set in three timeframes: the present following the events of the Arab Spring, the Pahlavi Era and the pre-Islamic Persian empires. It analyzes the many symbols used by the Pahlavis, many of which trace their origins to Zoroastrianism. It was launched in Bahrain, in the gallery of Abbas al-Mosawi where a short video clip about the 5 year process of writing the novel was played.

The novel was made into an audiobook by Alrawi. It has several narrators, and the author expressed his amazement at their ability to bring the novel to life.

=== Reception ===
Nader Kadhim praised the style of novel, viewing it as quite a bold move for a debut novel. The novel had multiple characters such as Mohammad Mosaddegh and Farah Pahlavi giving their often contradicting perspectives on historical events, and it was set in three different eras of Iranian history, ending with the 1979 Iranian Revolution. In a full review published in Asharq Al-Awsat, Kadhim said that Aryamehr Nameh was one of the good novels that were not only written by the hand, heart and mind of the author, but by his legs too, for he had travelled around the geography of Iran during the research phase, and it took him 5 years to complete. He added that the novel is both captivating and rich, and that its topic is unusual for Arabic novels.

Esmat al-Mosawi favorably reviewed the novel for Al-Wasat, describing it as beautiful and captivating. She noted that the Arab Spring was one of the author's inspirations for writing the novel. She added that the author had applied his interest in stamp and coin collection, as well as travel in order to research the setting of his novel. Fadhila al-Mosawi described the novel as an encyclopedia of Iranian history, and she especially liked that the history is told by an Arabic person, while at the same time giving it an Iranian point of view. She added:

The novel is captivating, smooth and attractive. It did not lack the element of suspense which holds the reader's breath up to the last pages as he continues in his eagerness for the pleasure of knowledge, and dives to the depths of an unfrequented world. It is a novel that satisfies the conditions of creativity, which makes it truly enjoyable.

== Dara the Zoroastrian ==
Dara the Zoroastrian (Arabic: دارا الزرادشتي) is the second novel by al-Mosawi. It was published by Dar Soual (Beirut) in January 2021. Like the first novel, this one is also a historical fiction set in Iran. Its events however take place in another time period, namely the 13th century. It revolves around Dara, a young Zoroastrian man who converts to Islam following its spread in Persia and through his spiritual journey many different religions and religious sects are explored. The 408-page novel took the author three years to write, and its publication was postponed for one year due to the COVID-19 pandemic.

Esmat al-Mosawi praised the novel, calling it worthy of the International Prize for Arabic Fiction. She noted the depth of the information displayed throughout the novel, saying it reflected the level of research done by the author.
