= Ammar Al Bannai =

Bahraini politician

- عمار البناي

Member of Council of Representatives
- In office 2018–Present
- Monarch: Hamad bin Isa Al Khalifa
- Prime Minister: Salman bin Hamad bin Isa Al Khalifa
- Preceded by: Abdul Rahman Bu Majeed
- Parliamentary group: Independent
- Constituency: 4th District, Capital Governorate

Personal details
- Born: Ammar Ahmed Ghuloom Al Bannai; 1973 (age 52–53) Bahrain
- Occupation: journalist

Ammar Ahmed Ghuloom Al Bannai (Arabic: عمار أحمد غلوم البناي; born 1973) is a Bahraini politician, journalist, and businessman of Iranian descent. He was sworn into the Council of Representatives on December 12, 2018, on behalf of the fourth district of the Capital Governorate.

== Education ==
He has a journalism degree.

== Career ==
He began his career as a television presenter and worked at the Information Affairs Authority, formerly the Ministry of Information. He later went into other parts of the private sector.

He was a member of the Board of Directors of the Bahrain Journalists Association, a member of the Bahraini-Omani Joint Business Council, and a member of the Bahrain Sports for All Federation.

== House of Representatives ==
He entered politics in 2014, running for the House of Representatives for the fourth district of the Capital Governorate. He lost in the first round, earning 649 votes for 15.59%, a sixth- and last-place finish.

In 2018, however, he ran for the same district, earning 2,068 votes (48.05%) in the first round November 24. He defeated Abdul Rahman Bu Majeed, the incumbent deputy since 2006, with a final result of 2,490 votes for 66.31%.
