= Ali Sayyar =

Bahraini newspaper founder and journalist (1926–2019)

- Born: 1926
- Died: October 2019 (aged 92–93)
- Occupation: Journalist
- Years active: 1950–2019
- Known for: Founder of Al Qafilah, and Sada Al Osbou

Ali Sayyar (1926–October 2019) was a veteran Bahraini journalist who founded and edited a newspaper, Al Qafilah, and a magazine, Sada Al Osbou. He was one of the founding fathers of the Bahraini press.

== Early life and education ==
Sayyar was born in 1926 in Bahrain. His father was Abdullah Sayar. Ali Sayyar graduated from technical schools in Manama and in Cairo.

== Career ==
Before involving in journalism Sayyar worked in Saudi Arabia and Kuwait. He started his career in journalism in 1950 contributing to the first issue of Sawt al-Bahrain which was a monthly political magazine. In his early writings in Sawt al-Bahrain he supported the members of the Free Officers in Egypt. Next he founded and served as the editor-in-chief of Al Qafilah (Arabic: The Caravan), its successor Al Watan (Arabic: The Homeland) and Sada Al Osbou magazine (1969–1999). Sayyar opposed the politics of Gamal Abdul Nasser in his articles in Al Watan. In 1956 he joined the High Executive Committee (Arabic: al-Hay'a al-Tanfidhiyya al-Uliya) which was a cross-sectarian nationalist political movement in Bahrain. The same year he began to work at the Ministry of Social Affairs and Labor in Kuwait. After working there for one year he involved in business and held various positions in Bahraini companies until 1969. In 1973 he became a member of the Constituent Council in Bahrain. The council was established by Isa bin Salman Al Khalifa, the ruler of Bahrain, to review the proposals about the constitution.

Later he worked for Akhbar Al Khaleej, a Bahraini newspaper, as a columnist. Sayyar was the honorary member of the Bahraini Journalists Association.

== Death and legacy ==
Sayyar died in October 2019. His biography was published by the Ministry of Information. In 2020 a book entitled Ali Sayyar in the Memory of the Nation was published by journalist Kamal Dhib.
