= Sawt al-Bahrain =

Monthly political magazine published in Bahrain in the early 1950s

- Categories: Political magazine
- Frequency: Monthly
- Founded: 1950
- Final issue: August 1954
- Country: Bahrain
- Based in: Manama
- Language: Arabic

Sawt al-Bahrain (Arabic: The Voice of Bahrain) was a monthly political magazine published in Manama, Bahrain, between 1950 and 1954. It was the first independent publication by the Bahraini intellectuals. The magazine laid the basis for the High Executive Committee (Arabic: al-Hay'a al-Tanfidhiyya al-Uliya) which was a cross-sectarian nationalist political movement in Bahrain founded in 1955 and inspired other publications including Al Isha which was a cultural journal.

== History and profile ==
Sawt al-Bahrain was launched by the progressive Arab nationalist intellectuals in 1950. The idea to start a publication first emerged in 1949 during a meeting of the political activists led by Abdul Rahman Al Bakir. The headquarters of Sawt al-Bahrain was in Manama, and it was published on a monthly basis. The magazine was circulated in the Gulf countries and read by people with progressive ideas in distinct places, including Gulf cities, Riyadh, Mecca, Medina, Cairo, Iraq, the Levant, Yemen, Tunis, Zanzibar, Karachi and London.

=== Editors ===
In order to avoid government pressure James Belgrave who was the son of the King's advisor Charles Belgrave was appointed to the magazine to manage the advertisement and distribution. With the same concerns Ibrahim Hasan Kamal who was the secretary to the Bahraini minister of education was made the editor-in-chief. Bahraini veteran journalist Ali Sayyar started his journalism career in the magazine's first issue. One of the regular contributors was a Saudi Arabian leftist activist from Qatif, Abdul Rasul Al Jishi. Another Saudi Arabian contributor was Mohammad Said Al Muslim.

Sawt al-Bahrain had also women contributors. Although contributions from Bahraini women were very limited, leading Arab female writers such as Lebanese Rose Gharib and Palestinian poet Fadwa Tuqan frequently contributed to the magazine. Charles Belgrave also contributed to Sawt al-Bahrain in which he used the term Arabian gulf instead of other alternatives being "the first Westerner to use [it]."

=== Content and political stance ===
Sawt al-Bahrain attempted to create a modernist, Arab, Islamic and anti-colonial agenda through the exchange of ideas amongst the progressive intellectuals in the region. The magazine featured articles on social justice, economic equality and anti-colonialism as well as political events in the region such as labour strikes at the Saudi Aramco in the early 1950s. It supported the unity based on nationalism and aimed to narrow the gap between the two sects, Sunni Muslims and Shia Muslims in the country. The editors of the magazine harshly criticized the Bahrain Petroleum Company (BAPCO) which was run by foreigners calling it Tyrannical BAPCO, a small state, and the colonialist company. The monthly praised the overthrown of the royal establishment in Egypt in 1952. On the other hand, various airlines from the Arab world published their advertisements in Sawt al-Bahrain which also covered literary work.

=== Closure and legacy ===
Sawt al-Bahrain ceased publication in 1954 due to the pressure from the British authorities as a result of the conflicts about the Suez Canal. The last issue of the monthly appeared in August 1954. The same year another Bahraini publication, Al Qafilah, was also closed, and the advisor of the king, Charles Belgrave, reported the reason for these closures as their "offensive remarks about neighbouring friendly states."

Sawt al-Bahrain inspired a Saudi Arabian opposition magazine Al Isha (Arabic: The Shining Light) which was published in Khobar in the period 1955–1957. In 2011 Bahraini dissidents based in London established a bilingual publication with the title Sawt al-Bahrain.
