= Ali bin Mohammed Al Rumaihi =

Ali bin Mohammed Al Rumaihi (Arabic: علي بن محمد الرميحي) is the Bahraini Minister of Information. He is also the Under-Secretary of the Royal Court for Communication and Information and Chairman of the Board of Trustees of the Bahrain Institute for Political Development.

== Biography ==
He holds a Master of Business Administration degree from the University of Nottingham and a Master of Information Management from the University of Leicester. After thirteen years working at the Ministry of Interior, he worked for the General Organization for Youth and Sports and for an additional three years in the private sector.

On May 2, 2013, Al Rumaihi was appointed by King Hamad bin Isa Al Khalifa to Under-Secretary at the Information Affairs Authority, the precursor to his current post.
