= Fawaz bin Mohammed Al Khalifa =

His Excellency Fawaz bin Mohammed Al Khalifa

Bahraini Ambassador to the United Kingdom of Bahrain to United Kingdom
- Incumbent
- Assumed office August 24, 2015
- Preceded by: Alees Samaan

Personal details
- Born: 1965 (age 60–61) Manama
- Parent: Mohammed bin Khalifa Al Khalifa (father)
- Relatives: Line of succession to the Bahraini throne

Fawaz bin Mohammed Al Khalifa (born 1965) is a Bahraini member of the House of Khalifa and since 2015 has been Bahrain's Ambassador to the United Kingdom. He is the eldest prince of the Kingdom of Bahrain and the brother of Shaikh Bin Salman Al Khalifa.

== Career ==
- For impression of early career, see Singh, in Islamic Monthly (2012), Ghostwriter for the Arab Leader.

From 2000 to 2010 Fawaz was President of Bahrain's General Organization for Youth and Sports.

From July 2010 to 2012 during the Arab Spring he was President of the Information Affairs Authority which was formed in July 2010 as a split from the portfolio of the Ministry of Culture and Information by a decree from King Hamad bin Isa Al Khalifa. IAA is the Bahrain's media regulator, operator of Bahrain Radio and Television Corporation, the Bahrain News Agency and the press pass issuing authority.

Fawaz used his power to restrict freedom of the press, while the Bahraini government systematically cracked down on political freedom and civil liberties. In April 2011 the IAA suspended Al-Wasat (Bahraini newspaper), Bahrain's only independent newspaper, and the authority was involved in the detention of an Iraqi journalist who was beaten and deported.

From 2012 to 2014, Fawaz was Minister of State for Communication. On August 24, 2015 he was appointed ambassador in London, where he presented his credentials in Buckingham Palace in December 2015, on February 17, 2016 in The Hague, on April 12, 2016 in Dublin, and on October 21, 2016 in Stockholm.
