= Mariam Bukamal =

Bahraini television presenter (born 1984)

- مريم بوكمال
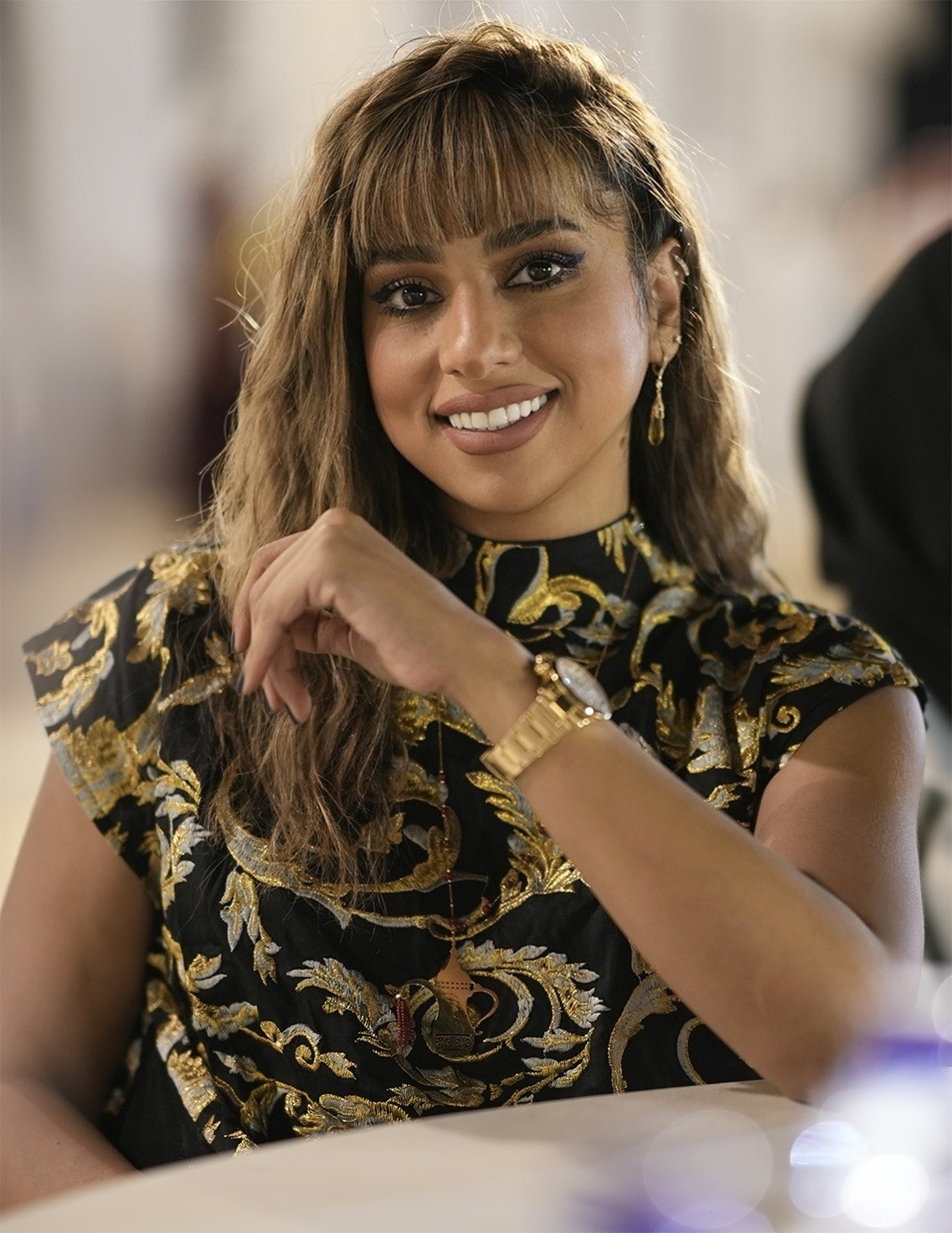
- Born: 18 August 1984 (age 41); Riffa, Kingdom of Bahrain
- Occupations: Director, Creativity & E-Media Directorate

Mariam Bukamal is a Bahraini sports commentator, anchor, television and radio personality.

== Career ==
Bukamal joined the Information Affairs Authority while she was in fourth grade to host Rokn Al Atphal, a radio program.

Her television career started when she presented Youth Time with Ali Hussein. She was an English teacher, before she joined the News Center as a sports anchor, and in 2011 became chief editor of the sports bulletin news. She started presenting variety shows through the Weekend program, which soon became a hit show. She then presented the Ramadan competition show Albarastii, which gained success due in part to the spontaneous of the show and the use of Bahraini slang instead of classical Arabic. She became known as one of the best announcers, distinguished by her spontaneous performance style, and she joined Al-Kass Sports Channel in March 2013 until November 2016 when she returned to Bahrain TV as Head of Sport Department in News Directorate and then in 2018 she became the head of Bahrain Sports channel. In December 2019 she was appointed as Director of Creativity & E-Media Directorate.

== Education ==
Bachelor of Arts in English Literature and translation from the University of Bahrain, 2007
Higher Diploma in Education with honors from Teachers College, 2009
Master's in the media and public relations from Ahlia University, 2012

== Television programs ==
Ramadan 2022 Presented Second Season of Ramadan Kids show "Almalaab Kids"
Ramadan 2021 Presented Ramadan Quiz show "Tahadi Almalaab"
Ramadan 2020 Presented Ramadan Quiz show "Khalik Fe Albait"
Ramadan 2019 Presented Ramadan Kids show "Almalaab Kids"
Ramadan 2017 Presented Ramadan competitions show "Al Bank"
Nov 2016 – May 2017 Supervising & presenting of "Almalaab" Sport Magazine Program For Bahrain TV
2014 - 2016 Co-presenting Sport Dot Net for Alkass Channel
May 2013 Co-presenting alkass wa alnas Show for Alkass Channel
January 2013 Co-presenting Aldaha Show for Alkass Channel
June 2011 – February 2013 Presenting the weekly show, Weekend, on Bahrain T.V.
Ramadan 2012 Presented Ramadan competitions show Albarastii
October 2011 Covered the ladies windsurfing competition in Oman for Bahrain T.V.
September 2011 Presented a four-day show for Eid Alfetr (Edeya) on Bahrain T.V.
Ramadan 2011 Acted a daily animated comedy show Bujlea.
November 2009 and 2010 Presented all-day coverage of the annual fishing competition (Yacht Club).
May 2009 Presented a summer program for the Royal Police Academy of the Ministry of Interior.
April 2009 Presented a program in English about Sebastien Buemi of the Toro Rosso team, Formula One driver, and three-day live coverage of the Bahrain Grand Prix (Formula One).
January 2006 – July 2006 Presented a live and weekly program Youth Time.

== Radio programs ==
January 2011 Presented a dedicated show on Bahrain Fm 93.3, Sameani eghneya.
January 2011 March 2011: Acted a daily comedy show on Bahrain Fm 93.3 (Radio Tube).
April 2010 Acting in the daily show on Bahrain Fm 93.3, Sheraa Alhawa.
January 2010 – January 2011 Announced political news on Bahrain Fm 93.3.
2009 Acted in a 30-episode series during the holy month of Ramadan, Hekayat Zaman.
2007 Acted in a 30-episode series during Ramadan, Wa Yoghani Alhamam.
2006 & 2007 Presented a three-day radio program in Eid Al-Adha Eid Dardeshat Eid.
2006 & 2007 presented a three-day radio program in Eid Al-Fitr Lealat Eid.
2001 – 2008 presenting a program An Hour with Youth.
2000 – 2001 Presented a live weekly children's radio show, Atphal Alyoum Shabab Alghad.
2000 – 2005 Presented a live daily children's radio show for the month of Ramadan.
1996 – 1999 Presented a live and weekly children's radio show, Rokn Al Atphal.
