= Nabeel bin Yaqub Al-Hamar =

Bahraini politician

- Born: 25 October 1950 (age 75)
- Occupations: Statesmen; Journalist; Advisor for Information Affairs to Hamad ibn Isa Al Khalifah
- Spouse: Afnan Rashid AlZayani

Nabeel bin Yaqub Al-Hamar (born October 25, 1950) is the advisor for Information Affairs to the King of Bahrain, Hamad ibn Isa Al Khalifah. He worked at the Bahraini Ministry of Information. Al Hamer was the first editor in chief of Al Ayam daily when it was founded it in 1989.
