= Daily Tribune (Bahrain) =

Daily newspaper in Bahrain

- Type: Daily newspaper
- Format: Print, online
- Owner: Al Ayam Publishing Group
- Founded: 1997
- Website: www.newsofbahrain.com

The Daily Tribune, also sometimes known by its subtitle News of Bahrain, is an English-language daily newspaper in Bahrain.

== History and profile ==
The Daily Tribune belongs to the family of Arabic newspapers in Bahrain Al-Ayam Publications. The newspaper is produced and managed by the media group Update Media WLL .

== See also ==
- Gulf Daily News
- List of newspapers in Bahrain
