= Al-Watan (Bahrain) =

Al Watan الوطن
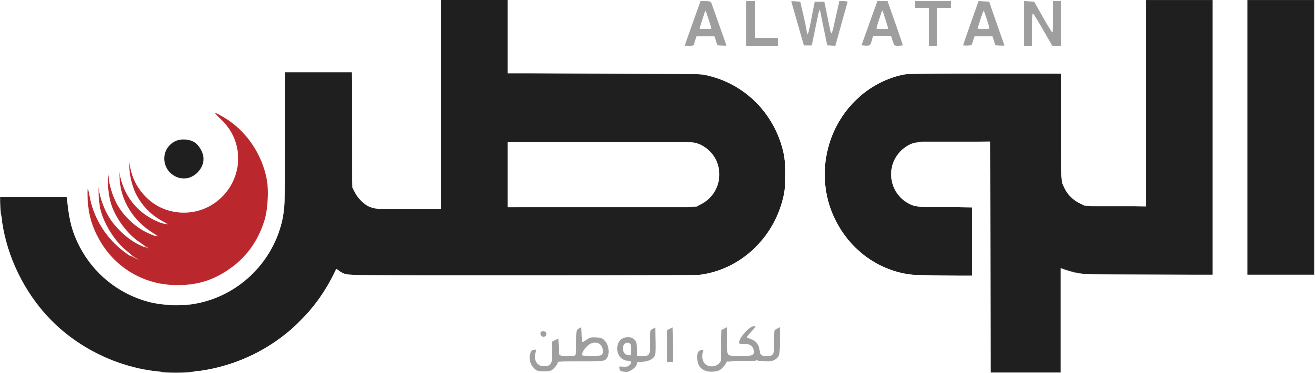
- Type: Daily newspaper
- Publisher: Al Watan for Publishing and Distribution Company
- Editor-in-chief: Yusuf Albinkhalil
- Founded: 10 December 2005; 20 years ago
- Political alignment: pro-government
- Language: Arabic
- Headquarters: Manama
- Website: Official website

Al Watan (الوطن, meaning The Homeland) is an Arabic daily newspaper published in Manama, Bahrain. It is known to have a pro-government stance.

== History and profile ==
Al Watan was launched on 10 December 2005. The publisher of the daily is Al Watan for Publishing and Distribution Company. Yusuf Albinkhalil is the editor-in-chief of the daily. Its board of advisers mostly includes Salafis. The paper is based in Manama.

The online edition of the paper was the 46th most visited website for 2010 in the MENA region.

== Content and political stance ==
The daily has supplements in business and sports.

It is a pro-government daily newspaper according to Human Rights Watch. However; the paper describes itself as independent. On the other hand, it is under the effect of Saudi Arabia through Salafi members of the advisory board.

== See also ==
- List of newspapers in Bahrain
