= Akhbar Al Khaleej =

Bahraini daily publication

Akhbar Al Khaleej أخبار الخليج
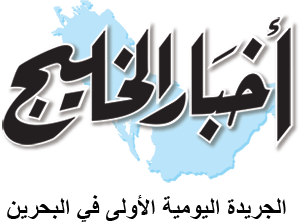
- Type: Daily newspaper
- Format: Broadsheet
- Owner(s): Dar Akhbar Al Khaleej for printing and publishing
- Editor-in-chief: Anwar Abdulrahman
- Founded: 1976; 50 years ago
- Political alignment: Pro-government; Arab Nationalist
- Language: Arabic
- Circulation: 30,000 (2023)
- Sister newspapers: Gulf Daily News
- Website: http://www.akhbar-alkhaleej.com/

Akhbar Al Khaleej (in Arabic أخبار الخليج meaning The Gulf News) is a Bahraini daily publication. It is the sister paper of the English-language daily, Gulf Daily News.

== History and profile ==
The first issue of Akhbar Al Khaleej was published on 1 February 1976. It is one of the Bahrain's oldest daily papers. The first editor-in-chief and founder was Mahmood Al Mardi and its staff composed of mainly Egyptian, Sudanese, and Bahraini journalists. Ali Sayyar, a veteran Bahraini journalist, had a column in the paper.

As of 2006 Anwar Abdul Rahman was the head of the paper. He also served as its editor-in-chief. The publisher is Dar Al Hilal which also publishes Gulf Daily News.

The daily is published in broadsheet format. The 1998 circulation of the daily was 25,000 copies and it was 37,000 copies in 2013.

== Political position ==
The paper is known to be close to Bahrain's main leftist opposition party, National Democratic Action and its columnists include some of the country's most prominent leftists such as Sameera Rajab and Mahmood Al Gassab, who is a leading member of the Jami'at al-Tajammu' al-Qawmi al-Dimuqrat, one of the four opposition societies to the government.

With its Arab nationalist stance, the newspaper has led condemnation of the United States' invasion of Iraq, and has been particularly critical of those Iraqis who have cooperated with the American backed political order: Samira Rajab in 2005 dismissed Iraqi Shia cleric Grand Ayatollah Ali al-Sistani as an 'American general'. This resulted in death threats towards Ms Rajab from Shia Islamists — who hold the Iraqi cleric in high regard — and brought to the surface political fissures in the alliance of Shia Islamists and ex-Marxists that had come together to oppose the 2002 Constitution.

Juan Cole on his Informed Comment website discussed the issue:

Al-Hayat reports that Samirah Rajab published an op-ed in the Khalij Times [sic] after the recent Iraqi elections in which she referred to Grand Ayatollah Ali Sistani as "General Sistani" and complained that the Shiite cleric had legitimated the foreign military occupation of Iraq by supporting the elections and by helping pacify the country for the Americans. The article produced vehement protests among the Bahraini Shiite community (the majority of the population), and demands that Bahrain newspapers be censored so as to prevent such comments from appearing in the future.

Shaikh Husain al-Najati, Sistani's representative in Bahrain, complained of the negative and derisive tone toward the grand ayatollah. Rajab had defended Saddam Hussein, and represents a Sunni Arab nationalist point of view that views the rise of Shiite dominance in Iraq as extremely unfortunate. This conflict demonstrates the kinds of tensions between Sunnis and Shiites provoked by the new situation in the Gulf.

On the other hand, the paper is considered to be pro-government.

== Controversy ==
In June 2009, the Ministry of Culture of Bahrain ordered that Akhbar Al Khaleej suspend publication for violating press laws; local sources alleged that it was a response to an article by Samira Rajab, which had attacked Ayatollah Ali Khamenei's regime in light of the Iranian presidential election and related protests.

== See also ==
- List of newspapers in Bahrain
