= Gulf Daily News =

English-language newspaper in Bahrain

The Gulf Daily News
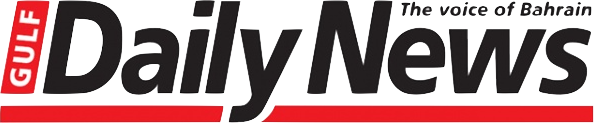
- Type: Daily newspaper
- Format: Berliner
- Owner: Dar Akhbar Al Khaleej for printing and publishing
- Publisher: Dar Akhbar Al Khaleej
- Editor-in-chief: Anwar Abdulrahman
- Associate editor: Andrews Victor
- Managing editor: Stanley Szecowka
- Founded: 1978
- Headquarters: Manama, Bahrain
- Circulation: 11,500
- Readership: 200,000
- Website: www.gdnonline.com

The Gulf Daily News is an English-language local newspaper published in the Kingdom of Bahrain by Dar Akhbar Al Khaleej. The paper, which is one of six daily newspapers in Bahrain, calls itself "The Voice of Bahrain".

== History ==
The Gulf Daily News was the first daily English newspaper to be published in Bahrain. It was founded in March 1978 by the Dar Akhbar Al Khaleej, which is also the publisher. The group also publishes Akhbar Al Khaleej, an Arabic daily.

Until the publishing of Bahrain Tribune, the paper was Bahrain's only English newspaper. The paper was created to provide news to the English-speaking residents of Bahrain, consisting mainly of British, Americans, Filipinos, Indians and Pakistanis. The staff are a mixture of Bahrainis, British, Filipinos, Pakistanis and Indians.

Traditionally, the Gulf Daily News is a pro-government publication, despite its largely balanced coverage of domestic affairs following political reforms instigated after 2001. Its staff includes both Sunni and Shia Muslims, while other faiths represented in its workforce include Christians, Hindus, and Sikhs.

The newspaper is currently owned by Dar Akhbar Al Khaleej. The paper is based in Bahrain with its editorial offices located at Isa Town and commercial offices in Exhibition Road.

The newspaper has a paid daily circulation of 11,500 copies. News content is primarily local, political and social news, but the paper also features international business and social news deemed to be of interest to its readership.

In addition, the GDNonline has a monthly online readership of more than 200,000,

A revamped website of the Gulf Daily News was launched in June 2015. The website also caters to the people of GCC countries including UAE, Saudi Arabia and Qatar. While the readers have to pay for the local Bahrain content, other sections are free to access.

In 2020, GDNonline launched a social media platform, focused primarily at providing a publishing platform for its local readership.

== Reporters ==
Reporters for the GDN currently include Mohammed Al A'ali (Bahraini), Sandeep Singh Grewal (Indian), Avinash Saxena (Indian), Reem Al Daaysi (Bahraini) and Naman Arora (Canadian).

Notable past journalists include Arthur Macdonald (Scottish), Mandeep Singh (Indian), Indira Chand (Indian), Reem Antoon (Iraqi), Colin Young (British), Robert Smith (British), Amira Al Husseini (Bahraini), Eunice Del Rosario (Filipino), Sara Wickham (British), Tariq Khonji (Bahraini), Soman Baby (Indian), Noor Toorani (Bahraini), Raji Unnikrishnan (Indian), David Fox (Zimbabwean) and Mohammed Mohsen (Bahraini).

Reporters who have since died include Les Horton (British), Richard Moore (American), Vinitha Vishwanath (Indian), Sanjay Santiago (Indian) and Mohammed Aslam (Bahraini).

The newspaper has several columnists who write regularly about local issues.

== Format ==
The paper has a page size of 36 cm x 26 cm and a column width of 3.45 cm with 7 columns per page. It is printed via Web Offset and has a 100 lpi (Black & White and colour) screen

The newspaper is organized in four sections:

- News: Includes International, National, Business, Sports, Weather.
- Opinion: Includes Editorials, Op-Eds and Letters to the Editor.
- Features: Includes Cinema schedules, Local events, Crossword/Games, Cartoons, Horoscopes, Channel schedules.
- Classifieds

== See also ==
- Daily Tribune (Bahrain)
- List of newspapers in Bahrain
