= National Union Committee =

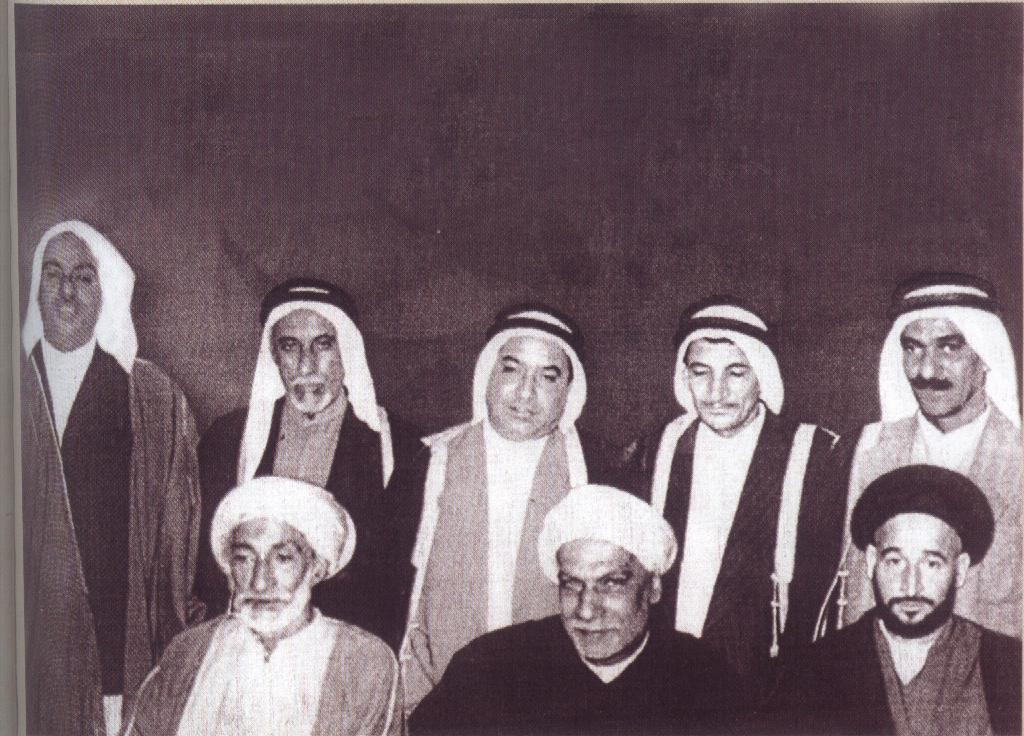
NUC members in 1954, L-R (back): Alaiwat, Bin Mousa, Al Bakir, Fakhro, Shamlan; (front): Al Tajir, Abudeeb, Kamaluddin

The National Union Committee (Arabic: هيئة الاتحاد الوطني) was a nationalist reformist political organization formed in Bahrain in 1954 (originally named the Higher Executive Committee, Arabic: الهيئة التنفيذية العليا). The committee was formed by reformists in response to sectarian clashes between Sunni and Shia members of the population. Its foundations were laid in the journal, Sawt al-Bahrain, which was founded and published by these reformist figures. The original aims were to push for an elected popular assembly, a codified system of civil and criminal law, the establishment of an appellate court, the right to form trade unions, an end to British colonial influence (through the removal of Charles Belgrave), and an end to sectarianism.

The original committee was made up of four Sunni representatives and four Shi'i representatives. The members were:

- Abdul Rahman Al Bakir (Arabic: عبدالرحمن الباكر) - Secretary
- Abdulaziz Al Shamlan (Arabic: عبدالعزيز الشملان)
- Ibrahim Fakhro (Arabic: إبراهيم آل فخرو)
- Ibrahim bin Mousa (Arabic: إبراهيم بن موسى)
- Abdali Al Alaiwat (Arabic: عبدعلي العليوات)
- Sayyid Ali Kamaluddin (Arabic: السيد علي كمال الدين)
- Shaikh Abdullah Abudeeb (Arabic: الشيخ عبدالله ابو ديب)
- Shaikh Mohsin al Tajir (Arabic: الشيخ محسن التاجر)

One of the early members of the committee was Ali Sayyar, who joined in 1956 and would become a veteran journalist in Bahrain.

== Arrest and deportation ==
The NUC successfully orchestrated a number of general strikes and demonstrations in the country to push for its demands. In March 1956, British Foreign Secretary Selwyn Lloyd was visiting Bahrain. Crowds of protesters lined the streets to shout anti-British slogans and threw sand and stones at the Foreign Secretary's entourage. A number of crew members, including a stewardess, were left injured. Abdulrahman Al Bakir, the secretary of the NUC, was among the leaders of the demonstrations. He was asked to leave the country after the incident for an extended stay abroad, and departed to Egypt. Al Bakir returned to Bahrain September 1956.

In October 1956, the NUC called for strikes and demonstrations against the Israeli-Anglo-French attack on Egypt in the Suez Campaign. This led to days of violence in Bahrain. In November, the ruler Shaikh Salman bin Hamad Al Khalifa, ordered the arrest of the NUC leaders, accusing Al Bakir, Al Shamlan and Aliwat of attempting to take his life. A specially set up court in Budaiya made up of three judges (all members of the ruling Al Khalifa family) tried the men and found them guilty. They were sentenced to 14 years at a prison located outside of Bahrain, in Saint Helena.

In June 1961 the three prisoners were released from Saint Helena after a successful habeas corpus action, and were later paid financial compensation from the British government.

== See also ==
- March Intifada
- National Liberation Front - Bahrain
- Popular Front for the Liberation of Bahrain
