= Al Ayam (Bahrain) =

Arabic newspaper published in Bahrain

- Type: Private media company
- Founder: Nabeel Al Hamer
- Publisher: Al Ayam Publishing Group
- Editor-in-chief: Isa Al Shaiji
- Founded: 7 March 1989; 37 years ago
- Political alignment: Liberal
- Language: Arabic
- Headquarters: Manama, Bahrain
- Circulation: 45,000
- Website: www.alayam.com

Al Ayam (meaning The Days in English) is an Arabic newspaper published in Bahrain and based in Manama. AlAyam Publishing was established on 7 March 1989, by group of young Bahraini journalists which was unique in the Arab world. It was founded by the former information minister, Nabeel Al Hamer.

== History and profile ==
The first issue of the Al Ayam in Arabic was published on 7 March 1989 and after that the daily Bahrain Tribune in English was published on 7 March 1997. Al Ayam group also published an entertainment weekly magazine Sada Al Osbou and a monthly magazine Gulf Panorama.

According to the latest surveys and studies that is made by specialized companies Al Ayam is the leading and the No.1 circulated newspaper in the Kingdom of Bahrain because of the variety of ideologies, credibility and the extensive coverage of local and international news.

Al Ayam was the first newspaper in the MENA region to use the modern Information Technology in editing, executing and publishing and one of the first Arabic newspapers which launched a website on the internet.

Al Ayam has a dedicated sports, kids and business supplement pullout along with the daily. The paper is a member of the project “Kitab Fi Jarida” – A book in a newspaper – which is one of the programs of the UNESCO. The publication is active in the cultural filed and it owns a distribution company and one of the most important and popular commercial bookshop in Bahrain. It uses one of the most modern presses in the Middle East that has the ability to print all types of newspaper, books and different types of publications.

Al Ayam celebrated its 21st anniversary in March 2010 and on this occasion Al Ayam Media Center was launched, which offices all the departments and the modern printing press in an area of more than 15,000 sq meter and is located on Shaikh Isa bin Salman Highway – Janabiyah, close to entry of King Fahd Causeway to Kingdom of Saudi Arabia, in a very strategic location.

Al Ayam is starting a new era in media and publishing sector and trust fully will continue its success as the leading media organization in the Kingdom of Bahrain. The paper is part of Al Ayam Publishing Group. Nabeel Al Hamer who is the former information ministry official and was the information affairs advisor to King Hamad in 2006 is the first editor-in-chief of AlAyam.

In 2001 AlAyam was the best selling newspaper in Bahrain with a circulation of 36,000 copies. The paper's online version was the 40th most visited website for 2010 in the MENA region.

== Political stance and criticism ==
The paper is a leading liberal daily newspaper. Its support for personal liberty and its criticism of religious extremism mean that Al Ayam has faced a barrage of criticism from Islamists. In 2005, hundreds of Shia Islamists protested outside the paper's offices after it published a cartoon on the victory of Iran's Mahmoud Ahmadinejad's election victory; while a concerted campaign by Sunni Islamists from Al-Menbar Islamic Society and Asala in May 2006 against the editor, Isa Al Shayji, saw the International Federation of Journalists intervene, with the IFJ's Secretary General Aidan White saying: “Journalists are rightly angry at this form of orchestrated bullying of a respected journalist. We want the authorities to speak out against this campaign. If they remain silent, it will only encourage further attacks.” Participants at an IFJ meeting in Beirut condemned the Islamist campaign against Al Shayji, saying “The vicious and unprovoked attack on a respected and distinguished colleague is an example of the intolerant and undemocratic character of extremist politics that is increasingly being used against the free press."

== See also ==
- List of newspapers in Bahrain
