= Al-Waqt =

Al Waqt الوقت
- Type: Daily newspaper
- Founded: 21 February 2006
- Ceased publication: May 2010
- Language: Arabic

Al-Waqt (Arabic: الوقت meaning The Time) was a Bahraini Arabic-language daily newspaper. It was published between 2006 and 2010.

== History and profile ==
Al Waqt was first published on 21 February 2006. Khawla Mattar was among the founders of the paper which was headquartered in West Riffa.

Ibrahim Bashmi, a member of Bahrain's Shura Council, served as the editor-in-chief.

The newspaper ceased publication in May 2010 after incurring financial difficulties. In July 2012, it was revealed that Bahraini MP Osama Muhana was planning to purchase the newspaper.

The paper had a leftist-nationalist slant, and along with Al Wasat, is regarded as the only Bahraini newspaper independent of the government. Among the popular writers for the paper's opinion columns were poet Qasim Haddad, Munira Fakhro, Abdulhadi Khalaf, and Mohammed Fadhel.

== See also ==
- List of newspapers in Bahrain
