= Al Bilad (Bahraini newspaper) =

Daily newspaper in Bahrain

- Type: Daily newspaper
- Publisher: Dar Al Bilad for Press Publishing and Distribution
- Founded: 2008; 18 years ago
- Political alignment: Pro-government
- Language: Arabic
- Headquarters: Manama
- Country: Bahrain
- Website: www.albiladpress.com

Al Bilad (Arabic: البلاد; The Country) is an Arabic daily newspaper published in Manama, Bahrain.

== History and profile ==
Al Bilad was established in 2008. The publisher is Dar Al Bilad for Press Publishing and Distribution company. Ali bin Khalifa Al Khalifa, son of the former Prime Minister of Bahrain Khalifa bin Salman Al Khalifa, is the owner of Al Bilad. As of 2011 Moanes Al Mardi was the editor-in-chief and chair of the paper.

The daily has a pro-government stance. However, several journalists contributing to the paper have been experiencing pressure from the authorities in the country. In addition, the management of the daily also fires them due to their participation in the protests and expression of anti-regime views.

Its circulation in 2013 was 10,000 copies.
