= Information Affairs Authority =

Agency in government of Bahrain

- هيئة شؤون الإعلام

Agency overview
- Formed: 8 July 2010; 16 years ago
- Preceding agency: Ministry of Culture and Information
- Jurisdiction: Government of Bahrain
- Headquarters: Isa Town; 26°9′49.39″N 50°33′13.58″E
- Minister responsible: Fawaz bin Mohammed Al Khalifa, President of IAA
- Deputy Minister responsible: Sameera Rajab, Minister of State for Information
- Child agencies: Bahrain News Agency; Bahrain Radio and Television Corporation
- Website: www.iaa.bh

The Information Affairs Authority (IAA) is Bahrain's ministry of information that was formed in July 2010. The president of IAA is appointed directly by the King of Bahrain and has the rank of a minister in the Bahrain government. From July 2010 to 2012, Fawaz bin Mohammed bin Khalifa Al Khalifa was President of IAA. In 2012, he relinquished the position to take up an appointment as Minister of State for Communication, and Sameera Rajab was appointed in his place.

== Responsibilities ==
The responsibilities of IAA include:

- controlling the Bahrain News Agency
- controlling the Bahrain Radio and Television Corporation
- regulating press and publications in the country
- acting as the official spokesperson for the government of Bahrain.

IAA is also the press pass issuing authority.

== History ==
It was formed in July 2010 by a decree of King Hamad splitting off the information portfolio of the Ministry of Culture and Information. Prior to the creation of IAA, the information function was performed by Mai bint Mohammed Al Khalifa as part of the Ministry of Culture and Information.

In April 2012, Sameera Rajab, an outspoken supporter of Saddam Hussein, and cousin of human rights defender Nabeel Rajab, was appointed Minister of Information Affairs in the Bahraini government. In 2016, Ali bin Mohammed Al Rumaihi was appointed Minister of Information Affairs.

== Independence ==
The first president of IAA, between 2010 and 2012, was Fawaz bin Mohammed bin Khalifa Al Khalifa, who is a member of the Al Khalifa ruling family and a cousin of King Hamad and the current Prime Minister of Bahrain, Khalifa bin Salman Al Khalifa. Prior to being appointed president of IAA, Fawaz served as the president of General Organisation for Youth and Sports.

Fawaz's father, Mohammed bin Khalifa Al Khalifa, served as Bahrain's Interior Minister from 1973 until 2004.

== Criticism ==
In 2011, the Information Affairs Authority came under criticism for its handling of the Bahraini uprising. According to the report issued in November 2011 by the Bahrain Independent Commission of Inquiry:

Having reviewed a selection of material from national television, radio and print media relating to the events of February/March 2011, the Commission notes that much of this material contained derogatory language and inflammatory coverage of events, and some may have been defamatory. However, the Commission did not find evidence of media coverage that constituted hate speech. The Commission also identified numerous examples of defamation, harassment and, in some cases, incitement through social media websites. Both pro- and anti-government journalists were targeted through social media. The Commission notes that six of the seven daily newspapers are pro-government and the broadcasting service is state- controlled. There is also sufficient evidence to suggest that the [Government of Bahrain] exercised censorship over local media outlets. The lack of adequate access to mainstream media creates frustration within opposition groups and results in these groups resorting to other media outlets such as social media. This can have a destabilising effect because social media outlets are both untraceable and unaccountable, even in extreme cases where they promulgate hate speech and incitement to violence.

The IAA was also criticized by Index on Censorship for its attempts to justify media censorship in Bahrain.

== Notable people in the IAA ==
- Fawaz bin Mohammed Al Khalifa
- Abdul Aziz bin Mubarak Al Khalifa
- Maysoon Sabkar
- Luma Bashmi
- Fahad AlBinAli
- Mariam Bukamal
