= Bahrain Tamarod =

Three-day protest campaign in Bahrain (2013)

- Part of aftermath of the 2011 Bahraini uprising
- Date: 14 August 2013 – 16 August 2013
- Location: Bahrain; 26°01′39″N 50°33′00″E
- Caused by: Human rights violations Political stalement Al Khalifa's (the ruling family) monopoly on power
- Goals: Self-determination; Freedom; Democracy
- Methods: Civil resistance Civil disobedience Demonstrations; General strikes

Parties
Bahrain Rebellion Movement; February 14 Youth Coalition; Anti-government protesters	Bahrain government Ministry of Interior

Lead figures
Hussain Yousif (Spokesperson of Bahrain Rebellion Movement)	Hamad bin Isa Al Khalifa (King of Bahrain); Khalifa ibn Salman Al Khalifa (Prime Minister of Bahrain); Salman bin Hamad Al Khalifa (Crown prince of Bahrain)

Number
Hundreds to thousands of protesters	Hundreds of security forces

Casualties
- Injuries: 10 protesters (2 critically) and 1 Asian worker
- Arrested: 20–23 protesters

Bahrain Tamarod (also spelled Bahrain Tamarrod; Arabic: تمرد البحرين, romanized: tamarrud al-Baḥrayn, "Bahrain Rebellion"), also known as August 14 Rebellion, was a three-day protest campaign in Bahrain that began on 14 August 2013, the forty-second anniversary of Bahrain's Independence Day and the two-and-a-half-year anniversary of the Bahraini uprising. The call for protests had started in early July following and inspired by the Egyptian Tamarod Movement that led to the removal of President Mohamed Morsi. Calling for a "free and democratic Bahrain", Tamarod activists, who mobilized social networking websites, said their movement was peaceful, national and non-sectarian. They called for gradual peaceful civil disobedience starting from 14 August. The movement gained the support of opposition societies and human rights activists, including those languishing in prison. The government however, repeatedly warned against the protests, promising those who participate with legal action and forceful confrontation. Rights activists and media reported that authorities had stepped up their crackdown campaigns in the weeks leading up to the protests.

In late July, the king called for a parliamentary special session. The pro-government parliament submitted 22 recommendations, some of them calling for stripping those convicted of "terrorist crimes" from their nationality and banning almost all protests in the capital, Manama. Despite outcries from the United Nations, Amnesty International and Human Rights Watch, the king endorsed the recommendations and issued two decrees to their effect. The Prime Minister asked his ministers to carry out the recommendations immediately and issued several warnings against protests. In the following days, the government arrested three photographers, two bloggers, a lawyer and a politician, prevented human rights activists and journalists from entering the country, deported an American teacher and reportedly encircled entire areas with barbed wire. The government denied arrests had targeted activists. A few days before 14 August, activists said they had gathered tens of thousands of signatures in support of highly anticipated protests.

The day of 14 August witnessed heavy deployment of security forces, which used tear gas and birdshot against hundreds to thousands of protesters who gathered in several locations throughout the country. Many shops were closed in response to Tamarod's call for a general strike. Opposition activists and media reported over 60 demonstrations throughout the country. The opposition and several citizens accused authorities of cutting Internet connections. The government blocked a website covering the protests, but activists and citizen journalists provided live coverage on social media websites, and Anonymous targeted a government website. At least twenty protesters were arrested and ten injured, two critically, activists said. The tightened security measures have succeeded in preventing large-scale protests in Manama. On 15 and 16 August, smaller protests occurred in several locations which police dispersed without injuries.

Tamarod and Al Wefaq opposition society praised the protests and said they were successful. The government of Bahrain however said protests did not affect everyday life. The United States said it supported freedom of expression and assembly, and voiced its concern at the chances of violence. Analysts were divided between those who expected protests to be huge and those that did not see them having any chance. They were also divided about the reasons behind the absence of mass protests in Manama, some blaming it on the security forces, others on protest organizers.

== Background ==
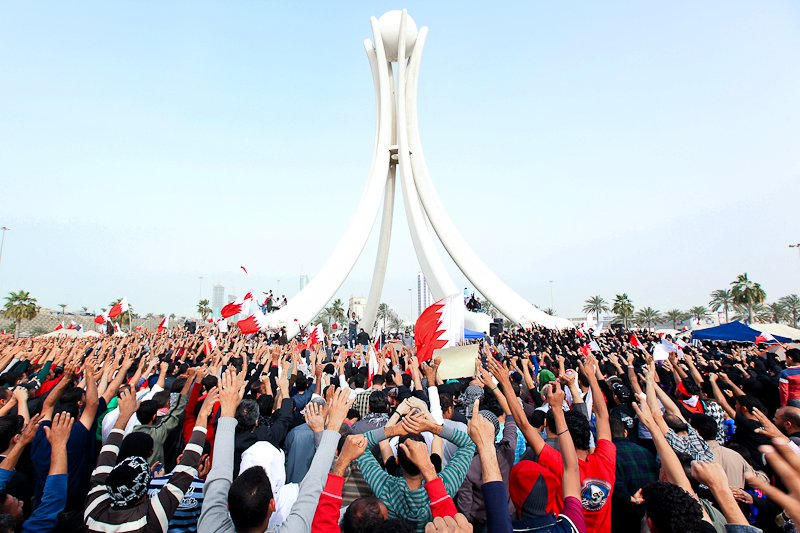
Protests at Pearl Roundabout in February 2011

Beginning in February 2011, Bahrain saw sustained pro-democracy protests, centered at Pearl Roundabout in the capital of Manama, as part of the wider Arab Spring. Authorities responded with a night raid on 17 February (later referred to by protesters as Bloody Thursday), which left four protesters dead and more than 300 injured. In March, martial law was declared and Saudi troops were called in. Despite the hard crackdown and official ban, the protests continued. According to the International Federation for Human Rights, at least 80 people were killed during the unrest.

== Calls for a rebellion ==
Inspired by the Egyptian Tamarod Movement that led to the removal of President Mohamed Morsi, Bahraini opposition activists formed Bahrain Rebellion Movement on 3 July 2013 and called for mass protests starting on 14 August, the forty-second anniversary of Bahrain Independence Day under the banner Bahrain Tamarod. The day also marked the two-and-a-half-year anniversary of the Bahraini uprising. The movement which is also known as the August 14 Rebellion, identified itself as "a movement calling for awareness, nationalism, sovereignty, independence and legitimacy, with a message of love, loyalty and dedication to all of the Bahraini people in rebellion against the authorities." One of its members said they were a youth movement, not a political party. A Reuters article described Tamarod as "a loose grouping of opposition activists who came together in early July to push for a 'free and democratic Bahrain' through mass anti-government demonstrations".

Activists mobilized social networking websites such as Facebook and Twitter to campaign for the protest movement. They issued their first statement on 4 July titled "Bahrain has Risen up" and "The August 14 Rebels" describing their goals and reasons. "[The people of Bahrain want] a nation that embraces all its citizens. We want a Bahrain to which we can all belong ... This movement is for freedom, for which Bahrainis have long yearned and made great sacrifices over many decades of struggle." The statement also accused authorities of confiscating the people's values and rights, and "restrict[ing] their movement and activities."

In an interview with France 24, Hussain Yousif, a member of the Bahrain Rebellion Movement said the movement will employ all types of peaceful civil resistance including the call for a gradual civil disobedience starting on 14 August with abstaining from shopping, commercial and government transactions such as paying electricity bills. He highlighted the royal family's almost complete monopoly on power, the political stalemate and ongoing human rights violations as main motivations. Yousif added that the main principles of the movement were peacefulness, non-exclusion and recognizing the people's right to self-determination, and called the authorities to understand their demands and refrain from using violence against protesters. "We use pure national slogans, not belonging to any specific sect or ideology," he said. The Christian Science Monitor said the 14 August protests were "the latest installment of a two-year long protest movement." Protests were planned to last for three days.

Left without an epicenter after the destruction of Pearl Roundabout in 2011, Tamarod announced their plans to stage peaceful protests in nine different locations, all in the streets, with the largest expected in Manama. One of the protests was planned near the U.S. embassy, a country that protest organizers had called on to use its influence to prevent government crackdown and protect demonstrations, which they said was an "ethical responsibility" for the U.S. "We hope that you may convey our deep concern to the US State Department and the US Congress to exert a real political pressure on Bahraini regime to avoid any fatal crackdown and bloodshed," they said in an open letter.

== Events leading to the protests ==
Soon after Tamarod's first statement, the Haq Movement for Liberty and Democracy announced its support for protest plans. "Let August 14 be the day of rebellion against the ruling gang in Bahrain," the movement said in a statement. The February 14 Youth Coalition also supported the protests and called for civil disobedience for 3 days. The youth group also told participants to avoid clashing with police. Ali Salman, leader of Al Wefaq opposition society welcomed the Tamarod plans. "We support any peaceful movement, at any time and from any party. Everybody has the right to protest ... the call for protests on August 14 shows that the Bahraini people will not cease to demonstrate until they achieve their demands," he added. Al Wefaq however, stopped short of taking part in the Tamarod movement, blaming their secession on clashes between security forces and protesters. "[I]t is going to be a peaceful movement but having said that I also expect clashes ... I only pray that there are no victims," said Ali Salman.

Jailed activist Zainab al-Khawaja smuggled a letter from prison in which she called people to participate in Tamarod protests. "On 14 February 2011, the people of Bahrain took to the street to demand their rights ... and on 14 August, the day of Tamarod, the people have to go out with same strength in order to send a message to the world and the regime that they have not and will never back down," the letter read. Zainab's father, Abdulhadi al-Khawaja who is also jailed delivered a message via Mohammed al-Maskati of Bahrain Youth Society for Human Rights (BYSHR) in which he called for "a peaceful Tamarrod on August 14th ... under the banner of 'Right to Self determination'." Another jailed rights activist, Nabeel Rajab also announced his support for Tamarod protests. "I call for rebellion [tamarrod] against all laws that violate the rights of the people. The law should be enacted to establish justice and equality between people and the protection of rights," his Twitter account, followed by 211,000+ and controlled by others quoted him saying.

On 13 July, the Ministry of Interior (MoI) warned against joining the 14 August protests which it called "illegal demonstrations and activities that endanger security". The MoI said it will "deal with any attempt to disturb security and stability". In anticipation to the 14 August protests, the MoI stepped up security measures and further warned that it will take legal action toward those who participate. The MOI has warned Bahrainis:

Not to respond or react to incitement from political events and social media posts that use 'Rebellion 14 August' and encourage the overthrow of the government. Rallies and activities that affect security, public order, civil peace and the interests of the people are against the law. Participants will have legal procedures taken against them.

The Prime Minister joined the MoI in warning against planned protests. The Al Wefaq opposition movement slammed the warnings and affirmed "the [people's] right to protest peacefully". "This will not solve the political crisis. The solution is in satisfying the people's aspirations for liberty, social justice and democracy," Al Wefaq added. Other opposition societies such as National Democratic Action Society (Waad) and Nationalist Democratic Assembly also joined Al Wefaq in affirming the rights of freedom of speech and freedom of assembly. Mainstream opposition societies cancelled a planned mass protest on 14 August, "because of the heavily intimidating security presence in Manama".

Tamarod is reported to have gained popularity among the opposition since mid-July, prompting the United States Embassy in Manama to eventually issue a warning for U.S. citizens to avoid certain areas in Bahrain on 14 August. The selected areas were mostly opposition strongholds. For weeks, the government was reported to have intensified its house raids and arrests against over five hundred wanted activists, many of them sleeping outside their homes for months in anticipation of such raids.

Maryam al-Khawaja, the acting head of Bahrain Centre for Human Rights (BCHR) said nightly raids were now occurring all day long and that physical, psychological and sexual torture had continued. "Since the announcing of the planned protest on the 14th of August ... [we have been seeing] a very severe escalation in the crackdown," she said. She added that Tamarod protests were "part and parcel of the ongoing uprising that started on 14 February 2011". According to activists, up to 400 were arrested during the month of Ramadhan (10 July–7 August) and more than 100 houses were raided in Manama alone.

=== Parliament emergency session ===
On 28 July, the Parliament held an extraordinary session at the request of the King, Hamad bin Isa Al Khalifa in which they submitted 22 recommendations calling for tougher penalties against "terrorist crimes" including stripping those convicted with inciting or committing such acts from their nationality and freezing their bank accounts as well as a ban on protests in the capital, Manama. Other recommendations included "increasing punishment for anyone propagating false information about Bahrain in social media networks", "taking legal action against certain political associations which incite and support violent and terrorist acts" and "taking all possible measures to impose peace and security, even if it means imposing a state of national safety [state of emergency]".

The parliament has been dominated by government supporters, especially after the opposition submitted their resignations in early 2011 in protest against government crackdown. According to RT, the Bahraini government often employs the terms "terrorists" or "thugs" to refer to protesters and has used "broad definitions of terrorism to detain scores of protesters and to convict several opposition leaders". A week earlier, the government used an explosion as a pretext to block several planned anti-government protests.

The session was held after weeks of escalations in clashes between protesters and security forces which had seen militant groups using bombs and police firing tear gas and birdshot, and the Minister of Justice said "terrorism" must be quelled before national reconciliation could begin. According to Reem Khalifa of the Associated Press, however, the session "appeared prompted by opposition calls for major protests Aug. 14." Khalil al-Marzouq of Al Wefaq said the recommendations were unconstitutional and that the session was a "popular cover [for the authorities] in order to issue its decrees." Emile Nakhleh said the session was "a spectacle of venom, a display of vulgarity, and an unabashed nod to increased dictatorship." He added that one MP referred to the Shia, who form the majority of citizens as "dogs" and that 14 August planned protests "drove the timing of the session".

The anti-Shia and anti-reform underlying theme of the recommendations is a naked display of tribal family autocracy, which Al-Khalifa are determined to preserve at any cost, including tearing the society apart.

— Emile Nakhleh

Bill Law of the BBC News said the "recommendations if implemented in full would effectively return the country to a state of martial law". An unnamed western diplomat said the recommendations timing was likely due to 14 August protest plans and the increasing violence. Marc Jones said that many of the recommendations were already in place. "Thirty-one Bahrainis were stripped of their citizenship back in November 2012, and there has been a de facto ban on protests in Manama since last year," he added and listed other examples of what he called "reactionary laws" already in place.

Maryam al-Khawaja said the government was merely giving a legal cover for its practices that have been in place for years. On the other hand, Tareq Al Hassan, the Public Security Chief said the session was historical and that it did not target a specific group or sect, rather it targeted terrorists and instigators. "14 August will pass just like regular days of the year and nothing will happen," he added.

The King, the Crown Prince and the Prime Minister (PM) welcomed the recommendations of the Parliament. The King ordered their rapid codification while the PM asked his ministers to carry out the recommendations immediately, or face dismissal if they slowed down. On 6 August, the King issued two decrees banning all "demonstrations, sit-ins, marches and public gatherings" in Manama, and jailing and/or fining parents if their minor children (under 16) were found to take part in protests in two occasions within six months. During the Parliament recess period, the constitution of Bahrain allows the King to issue decrees which are effective as laws.

The Office of the United Nations High Commissioner for Human Rights expressed concern about the recommendations, highlighting the right to nationality and asking the government of Bahrain "to fully comply with its international human rights commitments, including respect for freedom of expression and peaceful assembly, and association". Amnesty International said the emergency decrees were outrageous, violated the international law and a "shameful attempt to completely ban any form of dissent and freedom of expression in the country". "We fear that these draconian measures will be used in an attempt to legitimize state violence as new protests are being planned for 14 August," said Amnesty's regional director. A spokesman of the Bahraini government cited increasing violence including a policeman death and said the recommendations were "about trying to control the situation and trying to stabilze and secure people safety."

Human Rights Watch also criticized the recommendations, calling them "a whole new set of draconian restrictions" that would create "a new state of emergency". "The government has talked a lot about the need for national reconciliation but, once again, its actions in taking on a raft of stern new measures to suppress legitimate protest are undermining any prospects for successful dialogue," its regional director, Nadim Houry said. The International Federation for Human Rights and World Organization Against Torture "firmly denounce[d]" what they called "the intensifying crackdown on the Bahraini civil society". Freedom House said the recommendations were "a serious new threat to human rights in Bahrain, particularly freedom of expression and assembly", and that they violated the ICCPR treaty. The leader of Bahrain Press Associated said they were "a black page in the history [of the Parliament]".

=== Crackdown ===
Three days after the parliamentary special session, the government escalated its crackdown, arresting a photographer, Hussain Hubail, a blogger and his lawyer, and has continued to deny visas to foreign journalists. The arrested blogger, Mohamed Hassan also worked as a fixer for foreign journalists visiting the country and his lawyer, AbdulAziz Mosa was arrested after tweeting that Hassan was mistreated in prison. On 2 August, a second photographer, Qassim Zain Aldeen was arrested. Several Bahrain-based rights organizations wrote an open letter on 6 August co-signed by a number of international NGOs asking other international NGOs, mainstream media, Bahrain allies and the United Nations to pay close attention to Bahrain over the next week, especially on 14 August, which they said would likely see the country "come under lockdown". The letter said the rights situations in Bahrain has "rapidly deteriorated" during the previous weeks.

On 7 August, Al Jazeera English reporter, Hyder Abbasi was prevented from boarding a flight from Qatar to Bahrain. On 8 August, a third photographer, Ahmed Al-Fardan was briefly arrested, threatened and beaten by plainclothes police. On 9 August, Bahraini-Danish human rights activist Maryam al-Khawaja was prevented from boarding a British Airways flight to Bahrain at the request of the Bahraini government. Al-Khawaja who was planning to stay in Bahrain before and during 14 August said the move "show[ed] how nervous they [the authorities] are and how much they have to hide." The same day, an opposition activist, Mohammad Sanad al-Makina was arrested from Bahrain International Airport while attempting to board a flight to Sri Lanka with his family. Amnesty International named him a prisoner of conscience. An activist reported that 7 journalists were in hiding due to house raids.

On 8 August, the February 14 Youth Coalition said they had gathered tens of thousands of signatures calling for the right to self-determination. On 10 August, the Prime Minister renewed his warning against planned protests during a visit to Muharraq island. He also accused protesters of wanting "to change the regime and drag[ging] the country to chaos and ruin." "[T]his island will burn to a cinder all those who seek to tamper with its security and stability," he added. The same day, an American teacher was deported from Bahrain due to her "activities linked to radical opposition groups," the Bahrain Ministry of Communications said. Erin Kilbride was accused of working as an unaccredited journalist writing for the outlawed Bahrain Centre for Human Rights (BCHR), and of having links with Hezbollah.

"[Her posting was] deemed to incite hatred against the government and members of the Royal family," the ministry added. Al-Khawaja of BCHR denied Kilbride had written for them and said an As-Safir journalist denied the allegations too. "That was something made up by the government," she added. Bahraini authorities blocked bahrainaugust14.com, a website that offered timeline coverage for the protests within 24 hours of its launch on 10 August. A human rights activist said that despite the official ban and security checkpoints, a protest was held in Manama on 10 August, and was dispersed by police using stun grenades. On the other hand, the MoI reported that "terrorists" attacked a police patrol in Noaim using molotov cocktails. The Bahrain Mirror mentioned that all leaves for August were cancelled by several government agencies and ministries.

On 12 August, a human rights activist said police fired tear gas and stun grenades on several anti-government protests, and arrested nine demonstrators. The same day, the PM issued another warning against protests after an urgent Ministerial meeting, saying his government will "forcefully confront" them. "[The government] will punish [those] who stand behind them in line with the recommendations of the Bahrain National Council [parliament]," he added. Patrick Cockburn of The Independent said the PM warning showed the "nervousness" of Bahraini authorities ahead of the protests. The PM also held a meeting with the commander of Peninsula Shield Force, a joint Gulf Cooperation Council force that helped crackdown on protests in 2011. The state-controlled Bahrain News Agency (BNA) also reported that the PM headed a "high level meeting" attended by high-ranking officials to talk over arrangements before protests. The PM said his government was "at a critical stage [in the struggle to] eliminate terrorism".

On 13 August, Bahrain Mirror and activists said security forces have installed barbed wire around a number of residential areas expected to witness large protests. The areas were completely caged according to activists. Al Wefaq said authorities had turned some areas into a "vast prison for inhabitants." The Associated Press reported that barbed wire with checkpoints in between had separated Shia neighborhoods from main roads and Reuters witnesses said security forces had deployed reinforcements, including armored vehicles by night. The area of the-now demolished Pearl Roundabout was filled with hundreds of riot police standing next to armored personnel carriers. Tamarod spokesperson, Hussain Yousif said they will carry on with the protests despite government definite crackdown. The MoI said the heavy deployment was in order to "[preserve] security and order, and to guarantee an easy flow of traffic".

On the same day, Bahraini authorities summoned the Lebanese ambassador in Bahrain to file a complaint against a conference held by Bahrain Rebellion Movement in Beirut. In the conference, opposition activists called for civil disobedience and mass protests, the BNA reported. A number of Bahraini opposition politicians and human rights activists have based their activities in Beirut where they enjoy more freedom. The BNA added that the Lebanese ambassador said his government was not supportive of the conference and that they did not wish to interfere in Bahraini internal affairs. A day earlier, the salafist Al Asalah Islamic Society had criticized Lebanon for hosting the conference.

=== Reactions prior to protests ===
Reporters Without Borders expressed its concern at what it described "a new upsurge in abusive treatment of journalists in the run-up to the major 'Tamarod' rally". The France-based NGO said authorities had arrested 2 bloggers and 3 photographers in recent days. "The authorities plan to impose a news blackout on the 14 August demonstration by jailing netizens and preventing journalists and human rights defenders from visiting Bahrain," it added. Amnesty International issued a statement calling the government of Bahrain to allow Wednesday protests and expressed its fear that the new legislation will be used as a legal cover for quashing peaceful protests. "The Bahraini authorities must not crack down on mass anti-government protests scheduled for tomorrow," it said. The UK-based NGO also condemned the arrest of "journalists, photographers, bloggers and others active on social media networks in recent days [as a move to silence critics]".

The Bahraini government "vehemently refutes any allegations of targeted arrests," said an Information Affairs Authority spokesperson.

Nicholas McGeehan of Human Rights Watch said the government preparations were unjustified, inappropriate and disproportionate. "Bahraini authorities have a grim recent history of using excessive and lethal force to suppress peaceful protests, followed by the persecution of protesters and even doctors who treated their wounds," he added. The International Freedom of Expression Exchange described Bahrain authorities preparations as "pre-emptive crackdown on a peaceful, nationwide protest that has been weeks in the planning." The United States embassy said it would close its doors on 14 August and told Americans to "avoid non-essential travel inside the country". Naval Support Activity Bahrain, the base of United States Fifth Fleet ordered sailors to avoid Manama Souq, Bahrain City Centre and Seef Mall where protests were expected.

== Timeline ==
=== 14 August ===
Large numbers of security forces were deployed in Manama and helicopters hovered over. Roads leading to the city were guarded by security checkpoints and surrounded by barbed wire. Reuters reported that all shops were closed in some villages, while most shops in Manama remained open, with big police presence in the area, especially near Bab Al Bahrain. Tamarod had called for a general strike and pleaded businesses to close, while the Bahrain Chamber of Commerce and Industry issued a warning for businesses against responding to calls for a general strike, or risk facing legal action. An activist said protests started by dawn and that at least 3 were held in Manama. The Associated Press reported that small protests occurred in the morning and that most businesses "appeared to be shuttered", prompting Al Wefaq to claim success for the general strike. BNA reported that the PM made a visit to a shopping mall in Manama to assure visitors it was "business as usual".

In the early morning, up to 100 protesters took to the street in Saar village, west of Manama. The protest was peaceful and protesters were chanting anti-government slogans and waving Bahraini flags, witnesses said. Shortly before the arrival of security forces, the protest dispersed peacefully. In another village south of Manama, the MoI reported that an Asian worker trying to open a blocked road was injured after getting attacked with molotov cocktails and that a main road in Muharraq was blocked with burning tires. It described both incidents as "terrorism". Protests were also held in Malkiya, Juffair and Sitra where protesters held peaceful sit-ins and formed human chains. Some protesters were sitting in front of their houses, still they were attacked by security forces, witnesses reported. A video posted on YouTube showed police arresting and beating two men who were sitting in front of a house.

In Shakhura, west of Manama, police charged a group of 300 protesters who were restricted behind a barbed wire using tear gas and birdshot. Images by Reuters showed police beating an arrested protester after they dispersed the protest. In Karrana similar clashes occurred, with protesters hurling back molotov cocktails. No injuries were reported for both incidents. Later, police converged at Seef district in Manama, and "cordoned off the area using barbed wire" following a video message by Hussain Yousif to hold a rally there. Agence France-Presse (AFP) witnesses reported that hundreds of protesters who gathered in several Shia villages faced police tear gas and birdshot. Citizen journalists and activists provided live photo coverage of the violence on Instagram and Twitter.

Human Rights First (HRF) estimated turnout to be in thousands. Al Wefaq reported that over 60 rallies were held in 40 different areas throughout the day. Euronews and Al Jazeera English estimated the number of protests at 60 and reported they were mostly peaceful. Al-Mahafdha of BCHR reported that authorities arrested 20 protesters, including 5 women and a minor. He said protests turnout was in thousands "despite the campaign of intimidation and surrounding villages with barbed wire". The MoI said the woman driver who was arrested with her companions tried to "run over a policeman at a road block". The MoI added they arrested 20 individuals, among them 8 fugitives. Al Wefaq reported that the number of the arrested was 23 and that 4 were released later. Some injuries were reported in Karzakan and Demistan by the BYSHR. BCHR said 10 were injured by tear gas (inhalation) and birdshot, while Al Wefaq said 2 people were in a critical condition.

The BCHR accused the government of using "large amounts of tear gas ... to disperse anyone gathering on the streets". "[I]t has been very difficult for protesters to move from their villages onto the main streets because of the barbed wires that were set up last night," al-Khawaja said. The BCHR also accused the government of dispatching a large number of mercenaries from Pakistan and Jordan to aid security forces in the crackdown, however an opposition figure said this claim was hard to prove, because security forces wear masks. The Associated Press and AFP reported that the heavy deployment of security forces have succeeded in preventing large-scale protests in Manama, instead protesters were confined to neighborhoods around the city.

Al Wefaq released a statement accusing authorities of cutting Internet connection in a number of areas. "Personal devices of some citizens have also been selectively cut off," the statement added. The secular-leftist Waad society said that instant messaging applications such as WhatsApp had been blocked by VIVA Bahrain telecommunications company. Several citizens also complained of loss of Internet for several hours in different locations during the day. They said the cut was at a time when protests were being held. Previously in February 2011, when the uprising began, a similar situation occurred during which the Internet became either slow or was lost completely. Telecommunication companies said then that the problem was due an overload on Internet networks.

Reuters described the protests as "an upsurge of a two-and-a-half-year-old campaign". It reported that the morning saw protests end peacefully, while in the evening clashes between protesters and police occurred. Bahrainis in London organized a small, but vocal protest starting from the Bahraini embassy to Downing Street. Protesters criticized the United Kingdom over continuing to sign arms trades to Bahrain, despite human rights violations. "Instead of challenging Bahrain on human rights record our government is supporting it and it's a disgrace," said one protester. The websites of MoI and Qorvis public relations firm, which works for Bahraini authorities were targeted by hackers belonging to Anonymous group.

=== 15–16 August ===
In the morning of 15 August, protesters blocked several main streets and in the afternoon they clashed with police after holding sit-ins in a number of villages, in response to a call by February 14 Youth Coalition, the Bahrain Mirror reported. Tamarod had planned protests in Manama on 16 August, including a "car demonstration", however few hours before the start time, they cancelled the event. Security forces had been heavily deployed in Manama in anticipation of the protests. Tamarod said that by playing out this tactic, they "controlled the distribution and actions of security forces".

Hundreds of protesters in several Shia villages took to the street at night following a call by February 14 Youth Coalition. They called for the overthrow of the monarchy and chanted "Down with [King] Hamad", before clashes erupted with security forces. Police fired "buckshot, tear gas, and sound grenades" in response to protesters throwing stones and molotov cocktails at them. Al-Mahafdha said protests were held in Manama, Al Daih and Samaheej among other places and that there were no reported injuries. The MoI reported arresting members of a "terrorist group" in the village of Bani Jamra, west of Manama. Witnesses from Bani Jamra said detainees were severely beaten before arrest and that one of them with sickle-cell anemia was taken by an ambulance.

== Reactions ==
Spokesperson of Tamarod, Hussain Yousif lauded protesters response and called for further protests on Thursday and Friday, and said they planned to organize further protests in the weeks to come. "Many responded to the calls to come out and protest today ... The government has converted Bahrain into a military base trying to isolate the villages to prevent people from reaching protest sites," he added. Ali Salman of Al Wefaq praised Tamarod protests, saying they scored more success than expected by drawing media attention and maintaining peacefulness. He also expressed his relief about the small number of casualties and the lack of deaths. Human Rights First (HRF) criticized the government of Bahrain response to protests, which they said reflected the "increasing levels of frustration felt by many in Bahrain at the lack of any real reform". "What happened today confirmed fears that the government of Bahrain is determined to crush any form of dissent," said Brian J. Dooley of HRF.

The BNA downplayed the effect of the protests, saying it was "business as usual" in the country. "Bahrainis and expatriates reported to work on Wednesday just like any other day, defying calls by radical opposition groups of road blockades and attack on properties," the state-run agency added. Critics said the protests failed as most streets were empty and protests disorganized. Abdulla Al Junaid of the pro-government National Union Gathering said an opposition cleric criticized Tamarod as a "stillborn". The United States expressed its concern at the possibility of violence. "We remain very concerned about continuing incidents of violence in Bahrain and, of course, the possibility for violence and would urge all parties to strongly condemn violence and contribute to fostering a climate of dialogue and reconciliation," said the spokesperson of State Department. The spokesperson added that they "support[ed] the right of individuals to peacefully assemble and of course, the right of freedom of expression, including in Bahrain".

== Analysis ==
Prior to the protests, HRF said they were "likely to be the most significant in over a year". Saeed al-Shehabi of the London-based Bahrain Freedom Movement said the Tamarod movement would "renew Bahrain's forgotten revolution". Mansoor al-Jamri, editor of Al-Wasat independent newspaper expressed pessimism about the situation, saying that "it's a very volatile situation. We might be heading for a very harsh period." Marc Jones was also pessimistic. "It is unlikely that these 'Tamorrod' protests will amount to anything, especially as the Bahraini authorities have spent the past two years breaking the back of the opposition movement. In 2011, thousands were arrested, tens killed, and dozens tortured," he said. Ashley Lindsey of Stratfor global intelligence firm said the likelihood of protests reaching Manama was low due to the experience of security forces.

Ken Hanly wrote that the political violence in Egypt "will no doubt overshadow whatever repressive measures are taken against protests in Bahrain". Ala'a Shehabi wrote in the Foreign Policy that the choice of Independence Day by Tamarod should be understood as an attempt to gain true full sovereignty as opposed to Stephen D. Krasner's Organized Hypocrisy (1999): "the paradox that though there is an informal understanding that states are sovereign, they can still be subject to constant intervention". Jane Kinninmont of Chatham House said Tamarod protests would not succeed to replicate the Egyptian scenario "because the army in Bahrain doesn't play the same role, and many of the security services don’t include Shi'ite Bahrainis, so you don’t get that same sense of solidarity". Matar Matar of Al Wefaq said that even if thousands had participated in Tamarod protests, the situation would remain the same as long as the United States continued to support what he called an "authoritarian regime" in Bahrain.

Writing for the Gulf News Hasan Tariq Al Hasan argued that Tamarod protests on 14 August had failed to live up to the expectations. He said that one of the main reasons was conflicting instructions between Bahrain Rebellion Movement and February 14 Youth Coalition, which launched its own Tamarod protest under the title "Tamarod Storm". Ala'a Shehabi said the security measures had made it "physically impossible" for big numbers to gather in one place. In an opinion column in Al-Wasat, Jameel al-Mahari said it was not appropriate to speak about failure or success of the protests, instead he argued that Bahrain's real success was when the unrest ended, "when everyone listens to the voice of reason, when we reach compatible solutions, when the national cohesion is restored and when people feel they are equal before law and that they all are first class citizens."
