= Women in the Arab Spring =

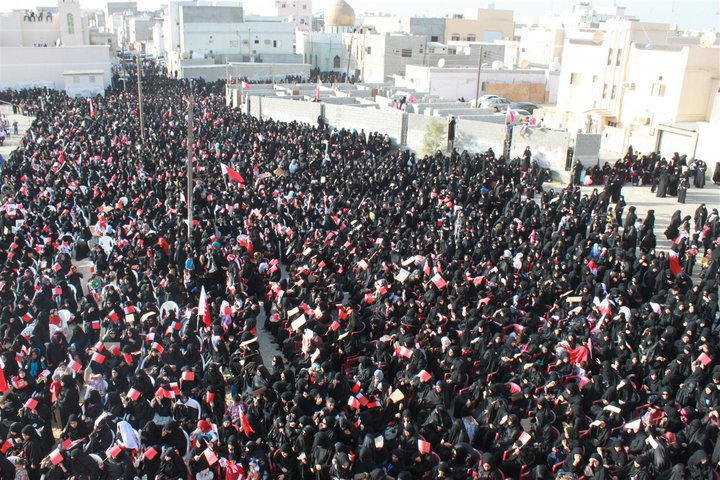
Women taking part in a pro-democracy sit-in in Sitra, Bahrain

Women played a variety of roles in the Arab Spring, but its impact on women and their rights is unclear. The Arab Spring was a series of demonstrations, protests, and civil wars against authoritarian regimes that started in Tunisia and spread to much of the Arab world. The leaders of Tunisia, Egypt, Libya, and Yemen were overthrown; Bahrain has experienced sustained civil disorder, and the protests in Syria have become a civil war. Other Arab countries experienced protests as well.

At this time, women's political participation was expanding greatly compared to before. They were participating in anti-government demonstrations and the protection of their rights for higher education by establishing a higher education system. Egyptian women have had a history of being active members of trade unions, organizations, informal networks, and online communities. Even though there are only a few women in politics in Egypt, those involved have advanced activism. Women's involvement in the Arab Spring went beyond direct participation in the protests to include cyberactivism. Social media has enabled women to be able to contribute to demonstrations as organizers, journalists, and political activists. Arab women played a key role in changing the views of many. They were important revolutionists during the Arab Spring, and many activists hoped the Spring would boost women's rights, but its impact has not matched expectations. Women face discrimination in the Arab world and since expanding their roles and participation was not a priority for other revolutionary forces, they ended up sacrificing a lot with no gain in the end. Islamist parties have risen to power in states that experienced changes of government, and some view their power as a major threat to women's status.

== Background ==
Sixty percent of the population of the Arab world is under the age of 30, and over half are female. The Arab Spring countries have a poor record on most gender issues, but have successfully reduced gender gaps in areas like education and healthcare. In the years leading up to the Arab Spring, there had been an authoritarian form of government. These nations intended to make more comprehensive political frameworks that depended on the rule of law and accountable governance. Tunisia, Egypt, and Libya faced this distinctly. In Tunisia, a Revolution was taking place, and the people from neglected rural areas were holding demonstrations. These protesters were able to find a common cause which empowered them to start a labor movement that was direct it towards the capital. In Egypt, uprisings composed of urban and cosmopolitan people all throughout cities. Meanwhile, in Libya, ragtag groups of armed rebels in the eastern regions touched off the challenges, uncovering the tribal and territorial differences that have affected the nation for a considerable length of time. In spite of the fact that they shared a joint call for personal dignity and responsive government, the upsets over these three nations reflected economic grievances and social progression. Women of all-encompassing countries have taken the path to challenge the transgressions of their countries. This being particularly apparent during the anti-regime in Tunisia, Egypt, and Libya.

=== Political participation ===
"Syrian women have been active in the fight against Bashar al-Assad's regime from the start, dating back to the peaceful demonstrations in early 2011 in the southern city of Dara'a." Unlike other armed conflicts, like the Iraq war and the Israeli-Palestinian conflict, women revolutionaries, both in and outside of Syria, have been involved in humanitarian efforts, providing food and medical supplies to displaced and injured citizens. Although women there have had the legal right to vote for years, the authoritarian nature of the old authoritarian regimes meant that both women and men had very few political rights. Freedom House, a non-governmental organization that promotes political freedom, stated that the Middle East and North Africa region "has historically been the least free region in the world". Even given the general democracy deficit, women had lower rates of political participation and representation in the legislatures.

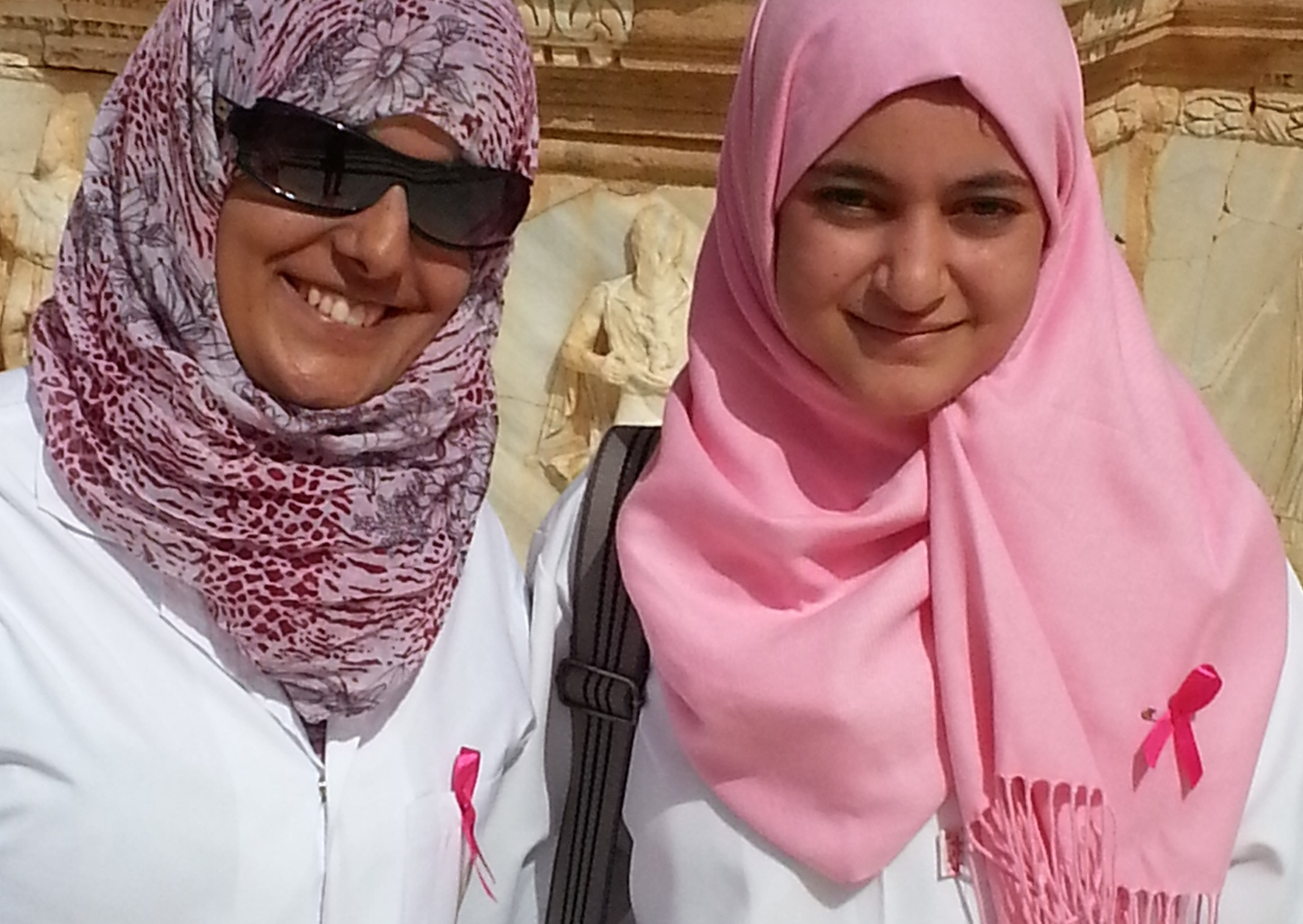
Medical students in Libya raising breast cancer awareness

=== Education ===
The Arab Spring countries besides Yemen have largely closed the gender gap in education. The female literacy rate and female-to-male primary school enrollment rate have grown faster than in most other developing countries. In Tunisia, Libya, and Syria more women than men are enrolled in universities. Despite these high levels of educational achievement, female participation in the workforce remains low due to cultural norms. Societal pressures deter women from pursuing careers that are "too successful," so many women choose to or are forced to follow the traditional route of staying at home and caring for the children. Women in urban areas or from the middle and upper classes tend to have more opportunities to break from traditional norms.

=== Health ===
Countries in the Middle East and North Africa have also improved women's health outcomes, resulting in one of the world's lowest excess female mortality rates (how many fewer women would have died each year had they been living in a high-income country). The region has reduced its maternal mortality and infant mortality rates and increased female life expectancy from 55 to 73 years in the past four decades. Birth rates are higher than in the developed world, but have been dropping as women stay in school longer and delay marriage.

=== Role of Islam ===
All of the states in the Arab world are majority-Muslim and Islam plays an important role in social and political life. so the impact of Sharia law on women's rights varies depending on a country's interpretation of it and how it connects to local traditions. Most countries in the Arab world place family matters under the jurisdiction of religious rather than civil courts. Many countries have religiously-justified "guardianship laws" that give women the status of minors and make them dependent on spouses or male relatives. In Syria, marriage contracts are between the groom and the bride's father, and Syrian law does not recognize the concept of marital rape. However, official recognition of Islam does not necessarily reduce women's rights. Certain interpretations of Sharia define fertility decisions as a private matter. Tunisia's pre-Spring constitution named Islam as the state religion, but since the 1950s and 1960s its laws have been more secular and have supported some women's rights. Women in Tunisia have access to contraceptives and abortions; polygamy is illegal; there is a minimum marriage age; and women have many marital and divorce rights. However, daughters have fewer inheritance rights than sons and husbands take control of wives' property after marriage.

=== Pre-Spring regimes' policies ===
Pre-Spring regimes enacted some pro-women's rights policies. The regimes strongly opposed Islamist movements and these policies stemmed from the desire to make society more secular. In Egypt, Hosni Mubarak gave women the right to sue for divorce from their husbands and implemented a female-friendly quota system for elections. Observers credited his wife, Suzanne Mubarak, with pushing the reforms. Syria's Bashar al-Assad made it legal for news outlets to report on honor killings, although judges could still reduce penalties if murder was justified that way. Libyan ruler Muammar Gaddafi made it illegal for men to marry additional women without their current wives' consent. He also discouraged women from wearing the hijab, describing it as an "act of the devil" that forced women to "sit at home." This policy drew criticism for reducing women's freedom to choose their attire, but it also promoted secularism.

== Women in the protests ==
Women helped spark the Arab Spring protests in several countries and actively participated in all of them. The demonstrations were based on the issues of freedom from tyranny and patriotism, not religious ones. Bahrain's uprising has had some religious influence because many protesters are Shi'ites angry about the Sunni monarchy's power and discrimination against Shi'ites. However, the protests promoted democracy and the end of discrimination rather than a religious agenda. Many women's rights activists hoped the revolutions would lead to more democracy and thereby more women's rights. However, they did not explicitly push for women's rights during any of the demonstrations.

=== Starting the protests ===
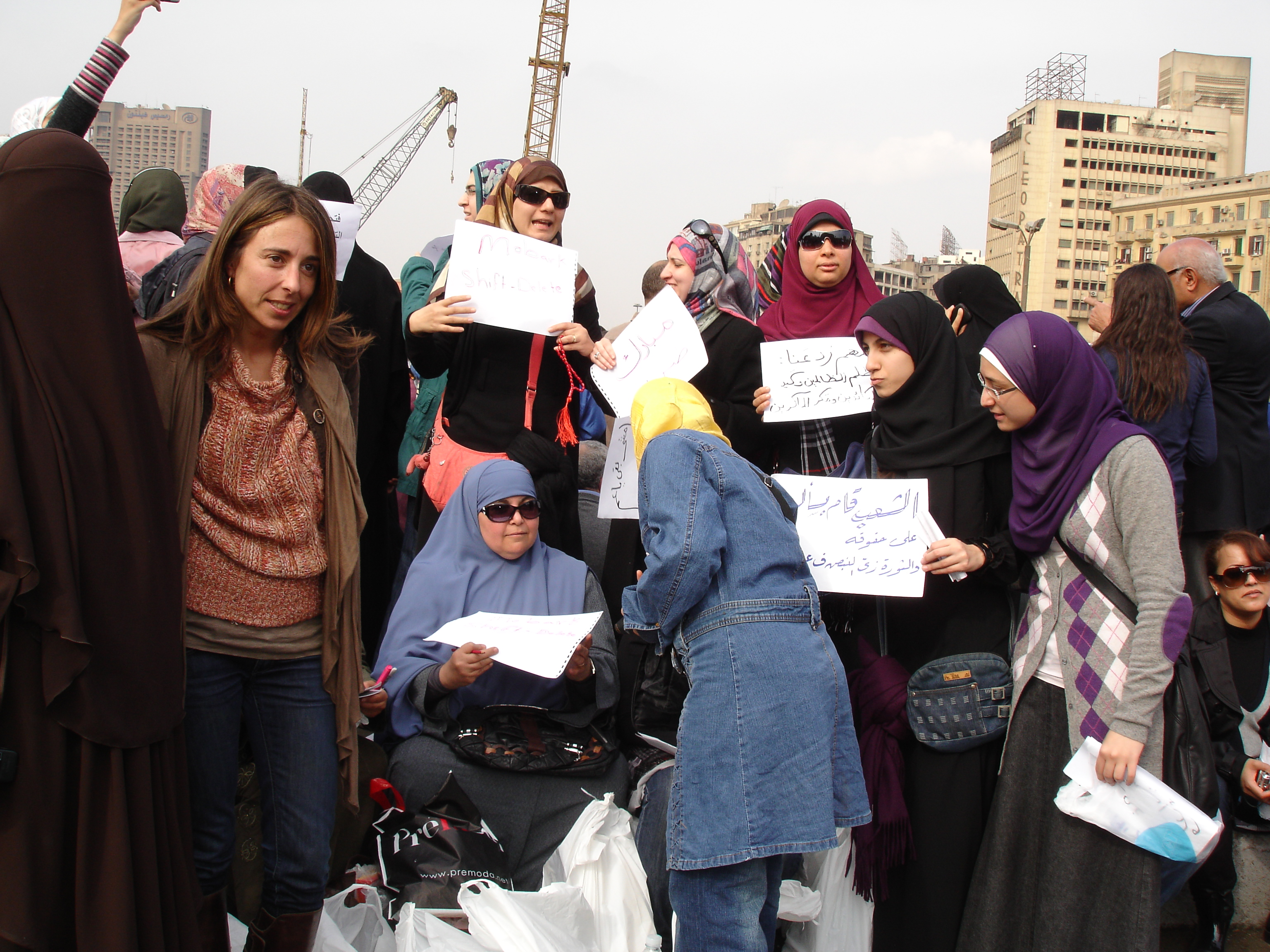
Women in Tahrir Square protest the rule of Hosni Mubarak

Individual women had played key roles in starting the protests. On 17 December 2010, Tunisian policewoman Fedia Hamdi's confiscation of Mohamed Bouazizi's street vending wares led him to set himself on fire in protest. This incident provoked protests in his hometown of Sidi Bouzid and eventually spread throughout the country to become the Tunisian Revolution. His family members and outside observers have hypothesized that Hamdi's gender compounded his embarrassment and frustration and drove him to the point of immolating himself. As the protests spread, blogger Lina Ben Mhenni reported from the rural areas where the protests started, including covering the security forces' attack on protesters in Kasserine. Her work provided vital information to other Tunisian activists and brought the events there to the world's attention.

In Egypt, activist Asmaa Mahfouz posted a video urging Egyptians to protest the regime of Hosni Mubarak in Tahrir Square on 25 January 2011, which is National Police Day. Her video went viral and the 25 January protests drew a large crowd, setting off the 2011 Egyptian Revolution. Yemeni activist Tawakkol Karman organized protests and student rallies against the rule of Ali Abdullah Saleh, which culminated in the 2011 Yemeni revolution and the abdication of President Saleh. Yemenis referred to her as the "Mother of the Revolution" and she was awarded a Nobel Peace Prize in 2011. Libyan human rights lawyer Salwa Bugaighis helped organize the "Day of Rage" protests on 17 February 2011. Those protests drove the Libyan army out of Benghazi, which marked a turning point in the Libyan Revolution.

Women were instrumental in every facet of the movement ascribing to a post-colonial feminism that rejected their powerlessness and gave them unique, thoughtful roles. While women joined men with a similar cause, to fight for regime change, they ultimately were pursuing different goals unique to their gendered status in society. In some cases women had set backs and suffered from more oppression than pre-Arab Spring. But, more than anything they made the issues of women's rights vulnerable again to conservative values. While a democratic election is a right for all citizens, women had very little influence on the election and most often a leader was chosen that did not address their concerns or bring justice for women.

=== During the protests ===
Thousands of women of all ages, classes, and religions participated in the protests in every country. When the police became unable to provide neighborhood security, women organized their own street patrols and guarded each other's tents. Women in Libya smuggled medicine and weapons and gathered intelligence for the rebels as the protests turned into civil war.

In Egypt, a country notorious for high levels of sexual harassment, male protesters treated the female protesters respectfully. On the other hand, male protesters in Bahrain have formed human chains to block women from taking part, and in Yemen's Change Square a rope divided the men and women. The women were subject to the same or worse treatment as the male protesters, including being "harassed, tortured, shot by snipers, and teargassed." Women who were imprisoned were threatened with sexual violence or subject to virginity tests, and in Libya there were reports of mass rape committed by government mercenaries.

Coverage of women in the Arab spring came at a somewhat perplexing rate. While CNN and other major American news outlets covered muslim women more, they often gave them a passive role in the commentary of their coverage. Most of the women were also shown wearing hijabs and more traditional muslim clothing than before, pointing to a change in coverage by US media outlets. This, however, was not reflective of the realities of the Arab Spring.

== Cyberactivism and social media ==
New technologies, particularly social media, enabled women to participate in the Arab Spring as organizers, journalists, and activists. Protesters used Facebook to mobilize supporters and organize events, and YouTube videos and Flickr photos gave the rest of the world visuals of the events of the Spring. Twitter functioned as a live newsfeed for other domestic and international activists as well as international media organizations. Mobile phones, especially those with cameras and Internet access, served as a key tool for cyber-activists. Blogs were another vital method for women to disseminate information. The numbers of female and male bloggers from Arab Spring countries were relatively even.

Internet access in the Arab World (2011)

Since older males dominate most conventional media networks in the Arab Spring countries, cyber-activism gave women their own voice, both domestically and abroad. Younger women, generally the most excluded from traditional news outlets, thus benefited the most from the rise of social media. The new platforms also enabled protesters, both male and female, to get their messages out without the filter of state-run media. Social media helped women engage more people in the revolutions by reducing distinctions between social and political networks.

While internet access remains relatively low in most of the Spring countries, the people whom online activities reached included key groups like power brokers, journalists, the intelligentsia, and Western governments and media. Women split their messaging evenly between raising domestic awareness of their causes and sharing information about the Spring with other countries, while men tended to focus only on domestic awareness. The use of social media allowed for an increased awareness of the contributions of individual women in the demonstrations. The women's updates ensured that the West's 24-hour news cycle always had firsthand sources. Bahraini activists Maryam Al-Khawaja and Zainab Al-Khawaja, Egyptian journalist Mona Eltahawy, and Libyan activist Danya Bashir were called the "Twitterati" (a portmanteau of Twitter and literati) because their Twitter accounts of the revolutions were praised by international media outlets.

Social media plays a key role for women in Tunisia while they face political issues. The internet has become an alternative way for women to defend their rights and also women's mobilization. Having access to the internet has helped women in Tunisia become more visible to the public, they have utilized social networks such as Facebook to promote women's movements. In this space they are able to express their issues and allow their actions to be known. Even though the country is heavy on internet filtering and press censorship, information and communications technology and social networks have help mobilize the push for political change. A prime example is the fall of Ben Ali's regime, even though the battle was won in the streets a big part of the Tunisian revolution was due to the support of information and communications technology. Tunisian women took part of the fall of Ben Ali's on January 14, 2011 by engaging in unions, marches, demonstrations, and their activism done on social networks. Another blog that became popular was by Lina Ben Mhenni. Her blog, A Tunisian Girl was also talked about on the blogs of many other women. With Mhenni's courage and bravery she was able to cover the battle in the western Tunisia. Mhenni was awarded in 2011 the Deutsche Welle International Blog Award and El Mundo's International Journalism.

== Female leaders and activists ==
=== Bahrain ===
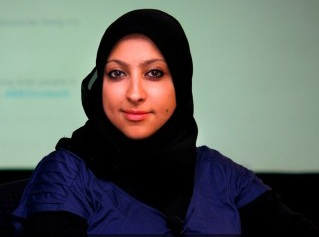
Bahraini human rights activist Maryam-Al-Khawaja

- Maryam Al-Khawaja: human rights activist and acting President of the Bahrain Centre for Human Rights; advocate for the Bahraini protesters to international governments and organizations and on Twitter; currently living in self-imposed exile in Denmark
- Zainab Al-Khawaja: human rights activist; participated in the Bahraini protests in person and on Twitter, leading the Bahraini government to arrest her multiple times
- Ayat Al-Qurmezi: poet and student; read an anti-monarchy poem to protesters gathered at the Pearl Roundabout, leading to her incarceration
- Jalila al-Salman: teacher and Vice President of the Bahraini Teachers' Association; organized teachers' strikes in support of the Bahrain protests, leading to her arrest
- Lamees Dhaif: journalist known for political and social criticism; supported protests until she had to stop writing due to a government crackdown on journalists

Nazeeha Saeed journalist arrested and tortured because she was a witness of crimes by police guards, she is travel banned.

Nedal Alsalman feminist and women human right defenders who became vocal and participated in all human right activities, at the moment she is one of the only human right defenders based on the ground, she is the acting president of Bahrain Centre for Human Rights after the arrest of president Nabeel Rajab

=== Egypt ===
- Israa Abdel Fattah: cyberactivist and blogger; co-founded the 6 April Youth Movement, for which she is known as "Facebook girl"
- Aliaa Magda Elmahdy: internet activist and women's rights advocate In 2011 Aliaa Magda Elmahdy was kidnapped in Egypt. She was kidnapped because she uploaded nude photographs of herself online with the caption, "Sharia is not a constitution" painted on her body. Elmahdy protested in this form to give the idea that women are not able to own their body. Women's bodies are public property and others decide what to do with them.
- Nawal El Saadawi: feminist, author, and opposition activist; reviving the Egyptian Women's Union, which was banned under Mubarak, in the face of opposition from Islamists
- Mona Eltahawy: Egyptian-American journalist and supporter of women's rights; arrested and sexually assaulted while covering post-revolution protests in Cairo
- Bouthaina Kamel: television newscaster and activist; after the revolution, she became first female candidate for the Egyptian presidency
- Asmaa Mahfouz: Egyptian activist and founding member of the 6 April Youth Movement; filmed a video urging people to protest on 25 January, which went viral and is credited with sparking the Egyptian Revolution

=== Libya ===
- Salwa Bugaighis: human rights lawyer; helped organize the 17 February protests that drove the army out of Benghazi
- Alaa Murabit: founder of The Voice of Libyan Women, a grassroots women's rights group addressing the issue of sexual violence, economic and political empowerment

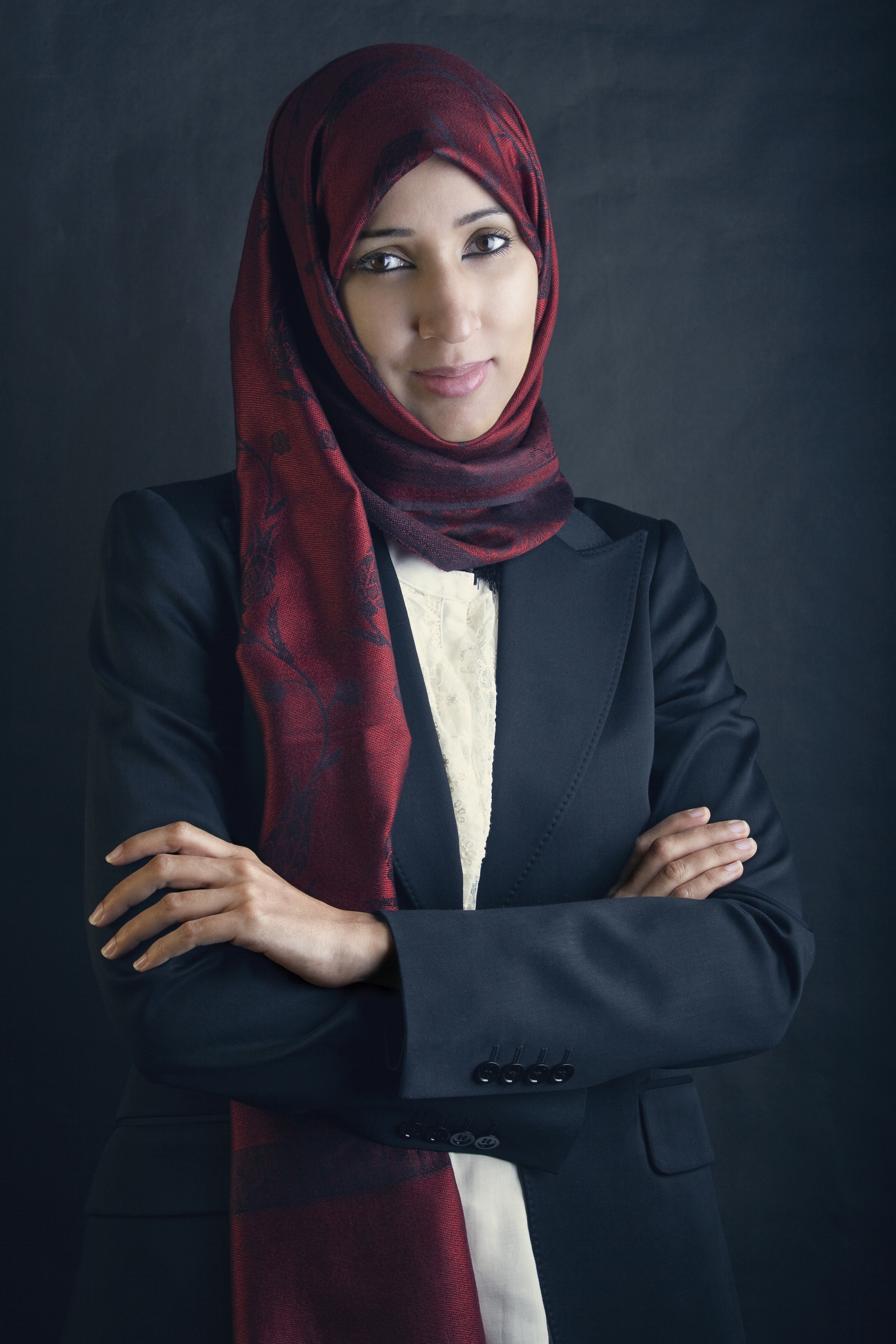
Saudi Arabian women to drive activist Manal al-Sharif

=== Saudi Arabia ===
- Samar Badawi: human rights activist; filed lawsuits against her father in relation to physical abuse and the Saudi Arabian male guardianship system, against the Ministry of Municipal and Rural affairs for refusing to register her as a voter in the 2011 municipal elections, and against the General Directorate of Traffic for rejecting her 2011 application for a driver's licence
- Hatoon al-Fassi: assistant professor of women's history; found evidence that women in the pre-Islamic Arabian kingdom of Nabataea had more independence than women in modern Saudi Arabia, active in women's electoral rights campaigning in the 2005, 2011 and 2015 Saudi Arabian municipal elections
- Wajeha al-Huwaider: women's rights activist; co-founder of The Association for the Protection and Defense of Women's Rights in Saudi Arabia, involved in 1990 and 2011 women's driving actions
- Eman al-Nafjan: well-known blogger; participated in the 17 June 2011 women's drive
- Manal al-Sharif: computer scientist and women to drive movement activist; detained for 10 days following a right-to-drive action in 2011

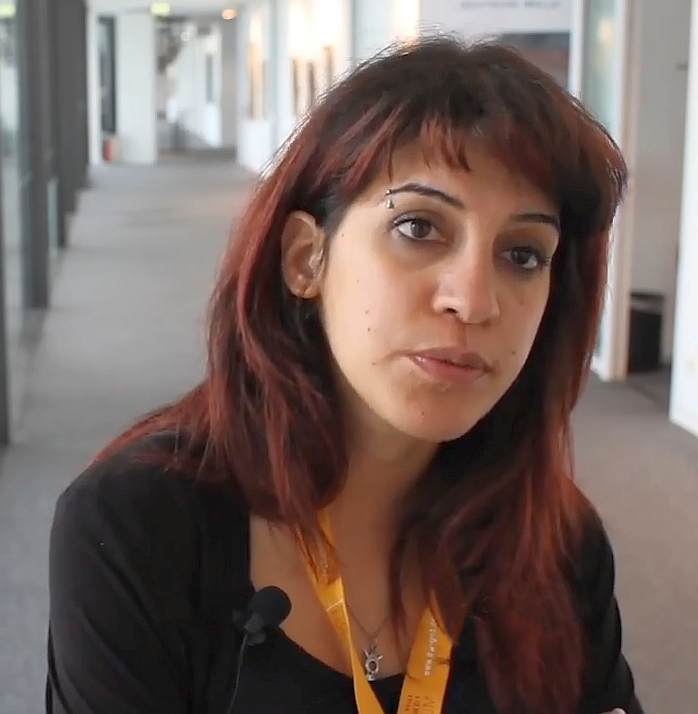
Tunisian blogger Lina Ben Mhenni

=== Tunisia ===
- Lina Ben Mhenni: blogger whose reporting from Tunisia's rural areas helped drive the revolution and bring it to international attention
- Raja bin Salama: prominent feminist; has called for Tunisia's laws to be based on the Universal Declaration of Human Rights
- Saida Sadouni: leader of the February 2011 Qasaba protests, which forced Prime Minister Mohamed Ghannouchi out of office

=== Yemen ===
- Tawakkol Karman: human rights activist, member of the Al-Islah political party, journalist and leader of "Women Journalists Without Chains"; led protests and rallies that culminated in the end of President Saleh's 33-year rule; called "Mother of the Revolution" by Yemenis and was one of the 2011 Nobel Peace Prize recipients

== After the protests ==
Some women's rights activists fear that the new Islamist-led governments in Tunisia, Egypt, and Libya will curtail women's rights.

In January 2013, women in Saudi Arabia were allowed to sit on the Saudi Shura council if they are "committed to Islamic Shariah disciplines without any violations" and must be "restrained by the religious veil." However, women in Saudi Arabia "are not allowed to travel, work, study abroad, marry, get divorced or gain admittance to a public hospital without permission from a male guardian. Although Saudi Arabia "experienced almost no mayhem during this Arab Spring" (81), it was still ranked last in a study that was based on reports from women across the state based on issues such as freedom of person and economic rights. However, women in Saudi Arabia now have the right to vote. In 2015, the first year women were allowed to vote, multiple women were elected to different councils in the Saudi government, with King Abdullah adding 30 women to the Shura Council, which is a group of advisors. The male guardianship system is still an important part of Saudi society, even though Saudi Arabia has told the UN twice that it would abolish the system. One of Saudi Arabia's most senior clerics has said that repealing the system would threaten the existence of Saudi society and be a crime against the religion of Islam. Many activists hope that with the inclusion of more women in the workforce, Saudi society will be more open to this change. In September 2017, the Saudi Arabian government announced that women would receive the right to drive, effective June 2018.

In 2012, the General National Congress of Libya saw women obtain 33 of the 200 seats. However, there is controversy concerning whether or not women and men can mix in a public setting, which leads women parliamentarians and activists to believe that women will not be fairly represented in the new Constitution. Violence against women has also seen an increase, as the number of women who are being intimidated and threatened with sexual harassment, virginity tests, and incarceration is rising. These women are usually the women who are trying to be politically active, and who are also struggling to vote, but can't because they are being chased out of polling places by people who believe that men and women should not intermix. So far, the government does not appear to by trying to help stop this violence.

Of the states that underwent change in the Middle East during the Arab Spring, Egypt was the first to hold democratic elections. As of 2012, Egypt had also seen some increase in the number of women who were in a seat of government, with 12 of the 498 seats in the Egyptian People's Assembly being occupied by women. This Assembly disbanded in 2013 and was replaced with the Constituent Assembly. The Constituent Assembly saw 6 seats out of the 100 go to women, all of whom walked out before the new constitution could be finished, which lead many Egyptian and United Nations legal experts to believe that the Constitution "did not prevent discrimination against women or safeguard the limited women's rights inherent in the PSL (Personal Status Law)". Due to the number of military sexual harassment cases, a movement called No To Military Trials helped to bring justice against the generals who committed the crimes. With the help of this movement, and laws passed that made sexual harassment a crime punishable with jail sentences and fines, the public sexual harassment surge is starting to slow down. Human rights groups are reporting that more women are reporting the crime and more men are being jailed for harassing. One organization reported that it had won more than 15 cases for sexual harassment between the years of 2013 and 2016. President Sissi has also helped combat the harassment, with seven men sentenced to life in prison, and two men sentenced to 20 years for their participation in assaults in Tahrir Square.

In Tunisia, the number of women who are participating in government is increasing, with women securing 61 of the 217 seats in the Tunisian Constituent Assembly in the 2012 elections. They have also gained many rights, such as the ability to obtain a divorce and gain custody of their children, and polygamy was also outlawed in the area. However, in Tunisia's new constitution, Elisabeth Johansson-Nogues notes that there is much controversy about the inclusion of gender specific amendments. In relation to the ambiguity of the language, there is no guarantee that women will be treated equally in society and the private sector. Because of this ambiguity, women are being publicly harassed for the way they dress, with very little help from the government in helping to stop it. In one case, "...a young woman was raped by police officers and, when she took the officers to trial, was in turn charged by the justice system for public indecency...". The government of Tunisia has yet to make a law protecting women against this type of violence.

The Arab Spring setback all economies involved in the conflict. While these Middle Eastern countries tried to reintegrate into the global economy, uncertainty about their political future shunned investors and did little to promote economic growth. With a large refugee crisis, unstable regional governments and currency, and a questionable future, many of these economies and countries will suffer compounding future effects. The Arab Spring could prove to be detrimental to women's rights for economic reasons as well. In a 2012 World Bank Report, they highlighted how greater access to economic resources can increase women's agency. As the economies of countries in the MENA region have suffered, slowing due to the Arab Spring, then so could the advancement of women's rights.

== See also ==
- Women in Islam
- Women in Bahrain
- Women's rights in Bahrain
- Women in Yemen
- Women in Tunisia
- Women in Libya
- Women in Egypt
- Feminism in Egypt
