= Naji Fateel =

Human rights activist

Naji Ali Hassan Fateel (Arabic: ناجي علي حسن فتيل) is a Bahraini human rights activist and member of the board of directors of the Bahraini human rights NGO Bahrain Youth Society for Human Rights (BYSHR). Since 2007 he has been imprisoned, tortured and the target of death threats during the Bahraini uprising (2011–present). He has been the subject of urgent appeals by international human rights organisations and the United Nations Special Rapporteur on Human Rights Defenders.

== 2007 arrest ==
In 2007 Fateel was arrested and subjected to torture in prison. Early in the morning of 21 December following disturbances the day before in Sanabis and Jidhafs, Fateel was arrested at his home and taken to the CID compound at Adliya. Late that evening he was interrogated by a police lieutenant, who Fateel was led to understand was Isa al-Majali, who accused him of setting fire to a police special forces jeep and stealing a weapon the previous day.

=== Torture ===
When Fateel denied the accusations, subordinates of al-Majali kicked and punched Fateel and then used devices resembling a cattle prod and a stun gun to inflict electric shocks on his torso and neck. Later he was suspended from the ceiling while electric shocks were applied to his body and particularly to the genitals which caused Fateel to lose consciousness at times and left burn marks on his body.

When he complained about this mistreatment to the Public Prosecutor's Office, he was referred for medical examination. The medical examiner, who saw him a week after his mistreatment, described his burn marks as minor injuries and made no comment about the bruises and swelling allegedly still visible on Fateel's face.

=== Reactions ===
In its report The Revival of Physical Coercion during Interrogations in Bahrain, Human Rights Watch cited Fateel's testimony of his treatment in reaching its conclusion that credible evidence demonstrated that since December 2007 the Bahraini security forces had used techniques such as electro-shock devices and suspending victims by their arms and legs that constituted torture and violated Bahrain’s obligations under international and national law.

The UN Special Rapporteur on torture and other cruel, inhuman or degrading treatment or punishment, Manfred Nowak, reported to the UN Human Rights Council in February 2009 the answers the Bahraini government had provided to his communication of allegations that Fateel and other human rights defenders had been detained without access to their lawyers, that the Public Prosecutor had refused to provide details of charges to lawyers defending the activists, that some of the human rights defenders had been ill-treated and possibly tortured while in detention, and specifically that Naji Ali Fateel and Hassan Abdulnabi Hassan had been subjected to beatings when they protested that their cellmate Mohammed Abdullah al Sengais had been beaten with an iron rod and sexually assaulted.

The Government replied that it was the general policy of the Ministry of Internal Affairs to respect human rights, a forensic medical examiner had confirmed that none of the detainees had been tortured and that "all the measures taken with respect to them were in accordance with the law." The Department of Public Prosecutions had received no complaints concerning the individuals named, who had said nothing about being attacked when questioned by the Department and had decided during questioning to forfeit their right to have a lawyer present.

It claimed that they had been arrested and detained in connection with criminal inquiries pursuant to specific articles of Bahrain’s criminal law, relating to "a violent gathering on 20 December 2007, during which participants assaulted police officers, set fire to a police vehicle, and stole a weapon belonging to police officers." The individuals were suspected of offences that could not "be linked to, or justified by reference to, activities as human rights defenders" but had been "accorded all their rights of visitation and legal representation" and even though no allegations of assault or mistreatment had been made the Public Prosecution had ordered medical examinations which "confirmed that none of the detainees had sustained any injuries.

Allegations of torture or mistreatment of the detainees Sengais, Fateel, Hassan, and/or Al-Sheikh had been found "to be completely without foundation" and medical examinations had been unable to find no evidence of any mistreatment or abuse.

In February 2011, the Report submitted to the UN Human Rights Council by the United Nations Special Rapporteur on the situation of human rights defenders, Margaret Sekaggya, contained the Bahrain government's belated response to a communication about the group of detainees including Naji Ali Fateel sent to it in July 2008, reaffirming that they had not been tried or convicted because of their human rights work, but because they had participated in an illegal gathering at which they had "been carrying iron bars and Molotov cocktails, set fire to a police vehicle and stole a firearm from the vehicle".

It restated that no complaint of mistreatment had been filed with the Office of the Public Prosecutor and medical examination had confirmed they had not undergone torture. The High Criminal Court had agreed to the request by the accused's lawyers for their clients to be referred to an independent medical panel for examination, which had found old scars and bruises on their bodies that were not determined to be the result of torture. The appeals of the accused against their convictions had been dismissed.

The Special Rapporteur expressed concern about the significant increase in the number of allegations received and communications sent during the reporting period and also deep concern about the physical and psychological integrity of human rights defenders in Bahrain, in particular about the reported practice of detention in undisclosed locations and treatment in detention.

== Death threats ==
After 10 March 2011, messages calling for Fateel and human rights defenders Abdulhadi Al-Khawaja (of Human Rights Defenders) and Mohammed Al-Maskati (of Bahrain Youth Society for Human Rights) to be "killed and liquidated" as traitors and "heads of agitation and disorder in our beloved Bahrain" were circulated via SMS and social networking sites. One message reportedly alleged that they were "the instigators of disorder", who had organized movements of sabotage". Rupert Colville of the UN Office of the High Commissioner for Human Rights said that the messages had included detailed information that could be used to locate the three human rights defenders, including names, home addresses, photographs, personal identification card numbers, profession, telephone numbers, make of car and registration numbers. He voiced the UN's grave concern for the activists' security and called on the Bahraini government to protect them.

The organisation Front Line considered that the death threats were directly related to legitimate and peaceful work in defence of human rights and in particular the activists' participation in explicitly peaceful protests calling for democratic and human rights reforms in Bahrain.

Amnesty International has called on the Bahraini authorities to ensure the safety of three human rights activists and mount an immediate, thorough investigation to identify the source of the threats, which contained all the information about the activists that would be found on a national ID card, prompting suspicion that the source of the threats may have been Bahraini security intelligence officials who would have easy access to such information.

In April 2011 the Bahraini organisation Bahrain Centre for Human Rights which defends and promotes human rights in Bahrain included Fateel among a number of Bahraini human rights defenders, bloggers and political activists who were considered at high risk in prevailing circumstances in Bahrain after his photograph, address and telephone number were published on the internet with a message that he should be killed.

In May 2011 security forces broke into Fateel's house searching for him but failed to find him.

On 8 April 2024, Fateel was released following a royal pardon.

== 2026 arrest ==
On 18 August 2026, Fateel was arrested during a pre-dawn raid of his home in East Riffa. He was arrested in relation to the 2015 Jau Prison riot.

== See also ==
- Bahrain Centre for Human Rights
- Human rights in Bahrain
- Abdulhadi Alkhawaja
- Nabeel Rajab
