= Zainab al-Khawaja =

Bahraini activist (born 1983)

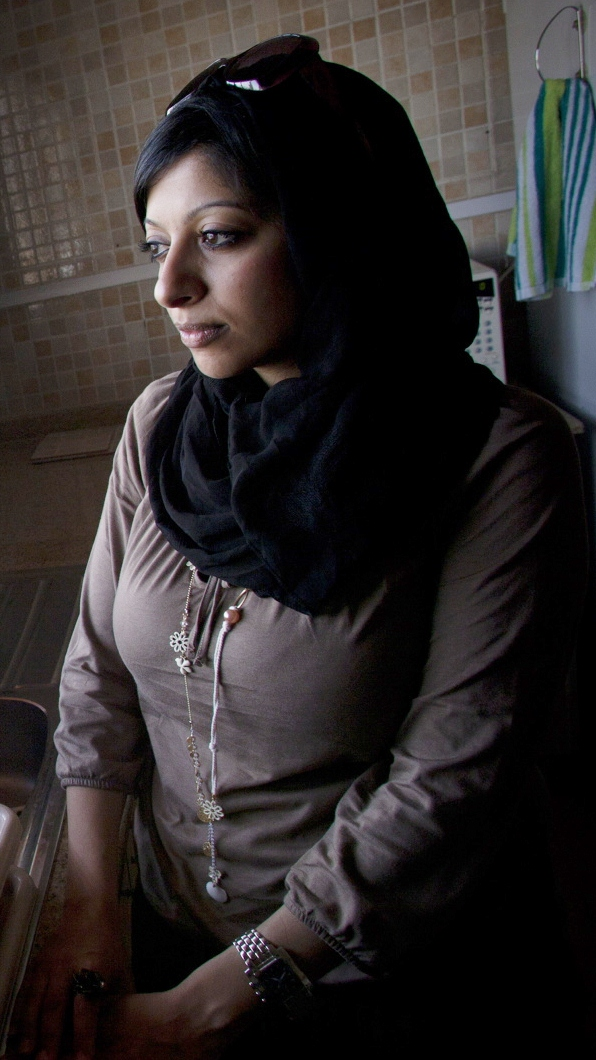
- Born: 21 October 1983 (age 42)
- Education: Beloit College
- Movement: Bahraini uprising (2011–present)
- Spouse: Wafi Almajed
- Parent(s): Abdulhadi al-Khawaja (father); Khadija al-Mousawi (mother)
- Relatives: Maryam al-Khawaja (sister); Jude (daughter, born ca 2009); Abdulhadi (son, born ca 2015)

Zainab Abdulhadi al-Khawaja (Arabic: زينب عبد الهادي الخواجة; born 21 October 1983) is a Bahraini human rights activist, and a participant in the Bahraini uprising. She rose to prominence after posting tweets online about the protests under the name AngryArabiya as well as for protesting her father Abdulhadi al-Khawaja's detention during his hunger strike.

== Background ==
Al-Khawaja promotes the Bahraini protest movement internationally via her Twitter feed, written in English. As of February 2012, she had 33,500 followers.

She is married to Wafi Al-Majed, and they have a daughter named Jude and a son named Abdulhadi. Her father is Abdulhadi Alkhawaja, former president of the Bahrain Centre for Human Rights, and former director of the Middle East-North Africa region for the International Foundation for the Protection of Human Rights Defenders' Front Line. Her sister's husband, Mohammed al-Maskati, is the president of the Bahrain Youth Society for Human Rights.

== Protests during 2011-2012 Bahraini uprising ==
In April 2011, al-Khawaja went on a ten-day hunger strike to protest the arrests of her father, her husband, and her brother-in-law Hussain Ahmad. She stated that though she had a one-year-old daughter, she preferred death to living under the current government: "If my father is going to be killed, I want to die as well...We've always been taught by my father that dying with dignity is better than living as slaves". She also criticized the administration of U.S. President Barack Obama for "standing behind the dictator".

Along with two other women, she was detained for seven hours on 15 June after trying to hold a sit-in at a United Nations office; having held onto her phone in the detention center, she continued to post updates to her Twitter feed, such as, "I think the UN might have misunderstood, we wanted the release of political prisoners, not to join them ;)". Commenting later on the arrest, al-Khawaja stated, "Our goal was never to get home safe, but to get protection for all political prisoners in Bahrain."

On 26 November 2011, a U.S. journalist witnessed al-Khawaja standing her ground alone in front of oncoming riot police; he reported that tear gas shells were being fired just past her head. Because of her fame, officers were ordered not to remove her from the road, and were finally forced to advance their vehicles by another route. On 15 December, however, she was arrested following a sit-in near Manama dispersed by riot police. She later told Amnesty International that she was beaten while in custody. On 21 December, she was released on bail, but was eventually charged with "illegal public gathering", "showing contempt for the regime", and "assaulting a police officer", charges which were still pending as of March 2012.

She was arrested again on 12 February 2012, as she tried with other female demonstrators to reach Manama's Pearl Roundabout. While the twelve women arrested with her were released on 20 February, al-Khawaja remained in detention and was charged with "illegal gathering of more than five people" and "participating in an illegal march". Amnesty International designated her a prisoner of conscience "detained solely for peacefully exercising her right to freedom of expression and assembly", and called for her immediate release. She was released from detention on 21 February. She stated she had not been mistreated while in detention, attributing it to the government's fear of "bad media" rather than respect of prisoners' rights.

Al-Khawaja's father began a hunger strike on 8 February 2012 which, as of 11 April, had lasted for 110 days, leading to fears for his health and appeals on his behalf from UN Secretary-General Ban Ki-moon, the U.S. State Department, and Amnesty International, who named him a prisoner of conscience. In April 2012, Zainab al-Khawaja was arrested twice more for protests against her father's ongoing detention. The first arrest occurred on 5 April following a sit-in at the offices of the Interior Ministry. On the 21st, she was arrested for sitting on a highway close to the Financial Harbour in protest. She was formally charged with disrupting the traffic and insulting an officer. On the 23rd, her detention was renewed for another seven days. Amnesty International called for her "immediate and unconditional release".

== Imprisonment ==
In December 2014, al-Khawaja was sentenced to three years in prison for tearing up a picture of King Hamad. A court gave her the option of paying a fine to remain at liberty until her appeal. Amnesty's Middle East and North Africa Deputy Director Said Boumedouha said that "Tearing up a photo of the head of state should not be a criminal offence." In June 2015, the sentence was increased to more than five years. During U.S. Secretary of State John Kerry's visit to Bahrain in April 2016, Bahraini Foreign Minister Sheikh Khalid bin Ahmed Al Khalifa said Zeinab al-Khawaja would be freed although the case against her will continue to be pursued.

On 14 March, fifteen riot police jeeps headed to Zainab's house, closed off the entire street in front of her apartment building, and arrested her along with her one-year-old son. She was held in custody in a local police station with her baby before being transferred to Isa Town Women's Prison. Charges brought against her included "destroying public property" after she tore up a picture of the King of Bahrain twice. On 31 May 2016, judicial authorities in Manama ordered to suspend her sentence and release her on "humanitarian grounds".

The announcement that al-Khawaja was set to be released came only hours after British foreign minister Philip Hammond visited Bahrain and praised the country's "commitment to continuing reform".

== Forced Exile ==
Even though Al-Khawaja was released there are still charges against her and she remained under threat of being re-arrested at any time. After the Bahraini authorities told the Danish embassy that they would arrest her if she remained in the kingdom, Al-Khawaja, who has Danish-Bahraini dual citizenship, fled to Denmark immediately upon her release. She announced her exile from Bahrain on Twitter.

Al-Khawaja continues her work abroad alongside her sister, Maryam, who was also exiled several years earlier, in 2014, after the government began prosecuting her in reprisal for her activism.

In September 2018, al-Khawaja joined a hunger strike outside her country's embassy in London, demanding medical aid and better treatment for prisoners in Bahrain. She also announced that she would be launching a hunger strike in solidarity with Ali Mushaima, a Bahraini activist who was briefly hospitalised on his 36th day of a hunger strike.
