= Maskati =

Maskati is a surname. Notable people with the surname include:

- Majid Al Maskati, part of the duo Majid Jordan
- Mohammed al-Maskati, Bahraini activist
- Omar Maskati (born 1989), American actor
