= Bahraini uprising =

Bahraini uprising may refer to:

- March Intifada, an uprising that broke out in British Bahrain in 1965
- 1990s uprising in Bahrain
- 2011 Bahraini uprising
- Bahrain Tamarod (2013)
