= Gulf Centre for Human Rights =

London-based international human rights organization

Gulf Center for Human Rights
- Founder: Khalid Ibrahim
- Type: Nonprofit; INGO
- Headquarters: Beirut, WC1; Lebanon
- Location: Middle East
- Services: Protecting human rights
- Fields: Media advocacy, research, lobbying
- Director: Khalid Ibrahim
- Key people: Nabeel Rajab, Abdulhadi Al-khawaja, Maryam Al-Khawaja
- Website: gc4hr.org

The Gulf Centre for Human Rights (GCHR; Arabic: مركز الخليج لحقوق الإنسان, romanized: Markaz al-Khalīj li-Ḥuqūq al-Insān) is an independent non-profit charity that defends human rights among Middle Eastern states including, Saudi Arabia, Bahrain, Yemen, UAE, Oman, Iran, Qatar, Syria, Iraq, Jordan, Kuwait, and Lebanon.

The GCHR is funded by the Sigrid Rausing Trust. Its vision is "To develop and protect a sustainable network of human rights defenders in the Gulf region." They are based in Lebanon.

The organisation was co-founded by Khalid Ibrahim along with Abdulhadi Al-Khawaja and Nabeel Rajab, Bahraini activists who have both been jailed in Bahrain. Bahraini activist Maryam Al-Khawaja is a co-director of the organisation.

In June 2021, the organisation filled a complaint in France against UAE's official candidate for Interpol's presidency, Ahmed Naser Al-Raisi. The organisation accuses him of being responsible for “torture and barbaric acts” against UAE dissident Ahmed Mansoor.

== Activities and Campaigns ==
On 5 August 2022, GCHR expressed its concern over the safety of four journalists facing death sentence in Yemen. GCHR demanded the immediate release of the journalists named Abdulkhaleq Ahmed Amran, Akram Saleh Al-Walidi, Al-Hareth Saleh Hamid, and Tawfiq Mohammed Al-Mansouri.

On 16 August 2022, GCHR called for the immediate release of a journalist Younis Abdulsalam Ahmed Abdulrahman who was detained over a year ago in Yemen.
