= Abdulhadi al-Khawaja =

Bahraini human rights activist

- عبد الهادي الخواجة
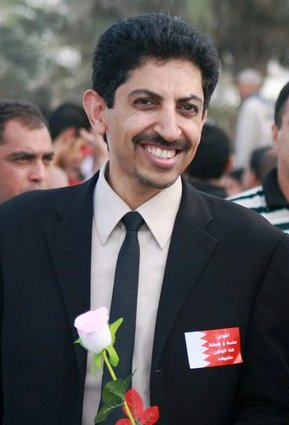
- Abdulhadi al-Khawaja taking part in a pro-democracy protest in February 2011
- Born: Abdulhadi Abdulla Hubail al-Khawaja; 5 April 1961 (age 65); Bahrain
- Occupation: Human rights defender
- Years active: 1979–present
- Criminal charges: organizing and managing a terrorist organization, attempt to overthrow the government by force and in liaison with a terrorist organization working for a foreign country and the collection of money for a terrorist group
- Spouse: Khadija Almousawi
- Children: Maryam and Zainab 2 other daughters

Abdulhadi Abdulla Hubail al-Khawaja (Arabic: عبد الهادي عبد الله حبيل الخواجة, romanized: ʻAbd al-Hādī ʻAbd Allāh Ḥubayl al-Khawājah; born 5 April 1961) is a Bahraini political activist. On 22 June 2011, al-Khawaja and eight others were sentenced to life imprisonment following the suppression of pro-democracy protests against the Bahraini government. Al-Khawaja has previously gone on a series of hunger strikes while serving his life sentence, in protest of the political conditions in Bahrain.

He is a former president and co-founder of the Bahrain Centre for Human Rights (BCHR), a nonprofit non-governmental organization which works to promote human rights in Bahrain. He has held a number of positions and played various roles in regional and international human rights organizations.

On 9 April 2011, al-Khawaja was arrested and tried as part of a campaign of repression by the Bahraini authorities following pro-democracy protests in the Bahraini uprising. Front Line Defenders expressed fear for his life following allegations of torture and sexual assault in detention. Al-Khawaja was sentenced on 22 June 2011, along with eight other activists, to life imprisonment. On 8 February 2012, he started an open-ended hunger strike until "freedom or death", protesting continuing detentions in Bahrain. The strike lasted for 110 days, and resulted in al-Khawaja being force-fed by the authorities.

Until February 2011, al-Khawaja was the Middle East and North Africa Protection Coordinator with Front Line Defenders – the International Foundation for the Protection of Human Rights Defenders. He is also a member of the International Advisory Network in the Business and Human Rights Resource Center chaired by Mary Robinson, a former UN High Commissioner for Human Rights.

Al-Khawaja is a member of the advisory board of the Damascus Center for Human Rights Studies and also an expert adviser for and member of the coordinating committee of the Arab Group for Monitoring Media Performance monitoring the media in Bahrain and six other Arab countries. Al-Khawaja was part of an Amnesty International fact-finding mission in Iraq, and has been a researcher and project consultant for Amnesty and other international organizations. His human rights campaigning activities have been acknowledged by the International Conference of Human Rights Defenders in Dublin, and the Arab Program for Human Rights Defenders named him as its Regional Activist of 2005.

== Early life ==
After finishing high school in Bahrain in 1977, al-Khawaja traveled to the UK to continue his further education. In 1979, he took part in student activities in London in reaction to demonstrations and arrests in Bahrain. Many students abroad, including al-Khawaja, were denied renewal of their passports and asked to return home. In the summer of 1980, after fellow students had been detained and interrogated under torture for their activities in London and his family's house had been ransacked and searched, al-Khawaja, fearing detention if he went back to Bahrain, decided to remain abroad.

== Civil and human rights activism in exile ==
In 1981, the Bahraini government staged a crackdown on opponents, claiming to have uncovered a coup attempt by the Islamic Front for the Liberation of Bahrain. Hundreds of civilians, mostly students, including minors, were detained and tortured. Seventy-three detainees were tried by the State Security Court (now abolished) on charges of membership of an illegal organization and attempting to use violence and given sentences of 7–25 years imprisonment.

In 1991, al-Khawaja was granted political asylum in Denmark. Following his resignation from the CDPPB in 1992, he and other Bahrainis living in exile in the Scandinavian countries and the UK founded the Bahrain Human Rights Organization (BHRO), based in Denmark.

During the period 1992–2001 BHRO gained respect for persistent, professional, and non-partisan activities at international level which contributed to the political changes that took place in Bahrain when the new ruler came to power in 1999. Al-Khawaja became head of the BHRO, prior to returning to Bahrain in 2001 following a general amnesty.

== Civil and human rights activism in Bahrain ==
=== Return to Bahrain ===
After 12 years in exile, Abdulhadi Al-Khawaja returned to Bahrain in 1999 following wide-ranging political reforms by the Bahraini government that allowed independent human rights groups to operate in Bahrain. Al-Khawaja became one of the main founders and director of the Bahrain Center for Human Rights (BCHR), which was officially registered in June 2002.

Al-Khawaja was also one of the founders of the Bahrain Unemployment Committee, described as sharing a "similar confrontational strategy" with the center. Many of the committee's members are involved in the centre or the Haq Movement, including Abdulwahab Hussain.

Since his return, al-Khawaja has been subjected to detention, unfair trial, and physical assaults as a result of his human rights activities. Well-documented physical assaults against him in March 2002 and June/July/September 2005 were not investigated despite pledges by UN bodies and international NGOs.

=== First arrest ===
On 25 September 2004, the BCHR was closed down, and al-Khawaja was arrested, a day after publicly criticizing the prime minister and the Bahraini regime for corruption and human rights abuses, using language which "the authorities easily construed as incitement of hatred". Throughout the two months that he spent in prison while on trial, his supporters held widespread protests, both inside Bahrain and abroad. On the morning of 21 November, the court sentenced al-Khawaja to one year in prison, but later in the day it was announced that he had been given a Royal Pardon by the King and was released. The BCHR is still banned by the government, but has remained very active.

=== Unemployment protest crackdown ===
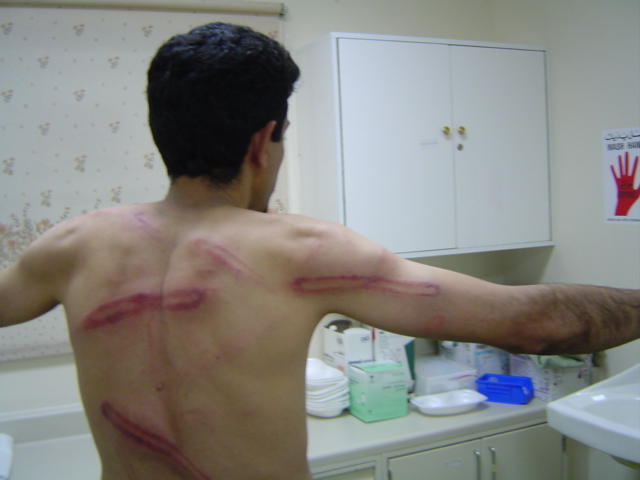
Beating marks on the back and arm of Abdulhadi al-Khawaja after an alleged police attack on a protest in July 2005

On 15 July 2005, police sought to prevent a peaceful demonstration by the Committee for the Unemployed against the government's management of the unemployment situation and the state budget for 2005–2006. The authorities had reportedly been informed about the demonstration a week earlier. While protesters were still assembling, the security forces charged and violently dispersed the demonstration. A total of 32 people said to have required hospital treatment, including Abdulhadi al-Khawaja, Nabeel Rajab and labor rights activist Abbas al-'Umran.

=== Second arrest ===
On 2 February 2007, al-Khawaja was arrested again by the Bahraini authorities along with the Secretary General of the Bahraini Haq Movement pro-democracy organization Hassan Mushaima and a third activist, Shaker Abdul-Hussein. Al-Khawaja was charged with offences including "promoting change to the political system through illegitimate means" and "an intention to change the governing system of the country, circulating false information, insulting the king and inciting hatred against the regime". The arrests were followed by public disturbances. Several hundred supporters who tried to hold a march in Jidhafs, on the outskirts of Manama, to demand the activists' release clashed with authorities. The Haq Movement spokesman Abdul-Jalil Al-Singace reported that Special Forces fired tear gas and rubber bullets at the demonstrators, who originated from several villages west of the capital. The demonstrators dispersed but later regrouped.

Police blocked roads around the area. Black smoke could be seen rising from the area. Witnesses said the demonstrators set tires and garbage containers on fire.

The Al-Wefaq Society, the largest grouping in the Bahraini Parliament with 17 out of 40 seats, called for an immediate session of the National Assembly, claiming that the arrests threatened the credibility of the reform process. Al-Wefaq chief Sheikh Ali Salman criticized the arrests in his Friday sermon and attacked the authorities for their use of indiscriminate force. After being held and interrogated for seven hours, al-Khawaja, Hassan Mushaima and Shaker Abdul-Hussein were released on bail. Mushaima and al-Khawaja said that they believed that their release on bail was a result of the protests and of the strong reaction from opposition groups including the Al-Wefaq society, the country's largest Shia opposition group. During a joint press conference with al-Khawaja, Mushaima said that Al-Wefaq's response had surprised the authorities and affirmed opposition solidarity.

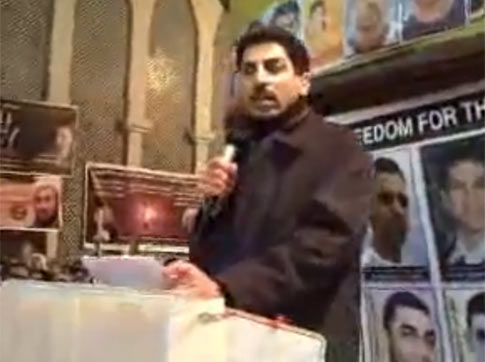
Speech for Abdulhadi al-Khawaja in Manama in January 2009

External videos
- Abdulhadi al-Khawaja speech (Arabic) in Manama in January 2009 on YouTube

=== Ashura speech ===
On 6 January 2009, al-Khawaja was invited to make a speech during Ashura day, which coincides with the annual gathering commemorating the martyrdom of Imam Hussain, the third historic Imam of Shia. During his speech, al-Khawaja referred openly to grave human rights violations in Bahrain including sectarian discrimination, corruption, plunder of public funds and land, arbitrary arrests, regular use of torture, unjust trials, denial of the rights of assembly and expression, and the prosecution of human rights defenders. He also called for peaceful resistance to abuses by the ruling regime and civil disobedience.

On 21 January, the office of the Attorney General ordered al-Khawaja's prosecution under articles 29(2), 160, 165, and 168(1) of the Penal Code. He was charged with "propaganda to overthrow or change the political system by force," "publicly instigating hatred and disrespect against the ruling regime," and "willfully broadcasting false and malicious news, statements or rumors and spreading provocative propaganda related to the internal affairs of the country that could disturb public security and cause damage to the public interest." On 9 February, he was not allowed to leave Bahrain for a visit to Iraq on behalf of Front Line.

== Threats and harassment ==
Al-Khawaja has been the subject of ongoing harassment including physical attacks and smear campaigns in the media.

On 19 September 2007, al-Khawaja was the principal target of a defamation campaign by the Bahraini authorities aimed at discrediting the BCHR. He was accused of being connected with acts of violence in Bahrain during the 1980s and 1990s, of sympathizing with Iran, and of coordinating with neo-conservatives in the United States. (The Bahraini authorities have a history of defaming activists who report on or publicly criticize high-ranking officials and official policies, particularly when western media and international human rights organizations are involved. Allegations are published in the national public media to which activists are refused access to defend themselves.)

On 9 February 2010, al-Khawaja was removed from a Turkish Airlines flight at Bahrain International Airport, as he was about to leave for Istanbul to attend a human rights conference. Following a subsequent alleged altercation with an airport official he was arrested and charged with "insulting" the official. Front Line believes that al-Khawaja has been targeted solely as a result of his legitimate work in defending human rights.

Since 10 March 2011, messages have been circulated via SMS and social networking sites calling for killing al-Khawaja, Mohammed Al-Maskati, and Naji Fateel because of their involvement in explicitly peaceful protests calling for democratic and human rights reforms in Bahrain.

== Involvement in the Bahraini uprising ==
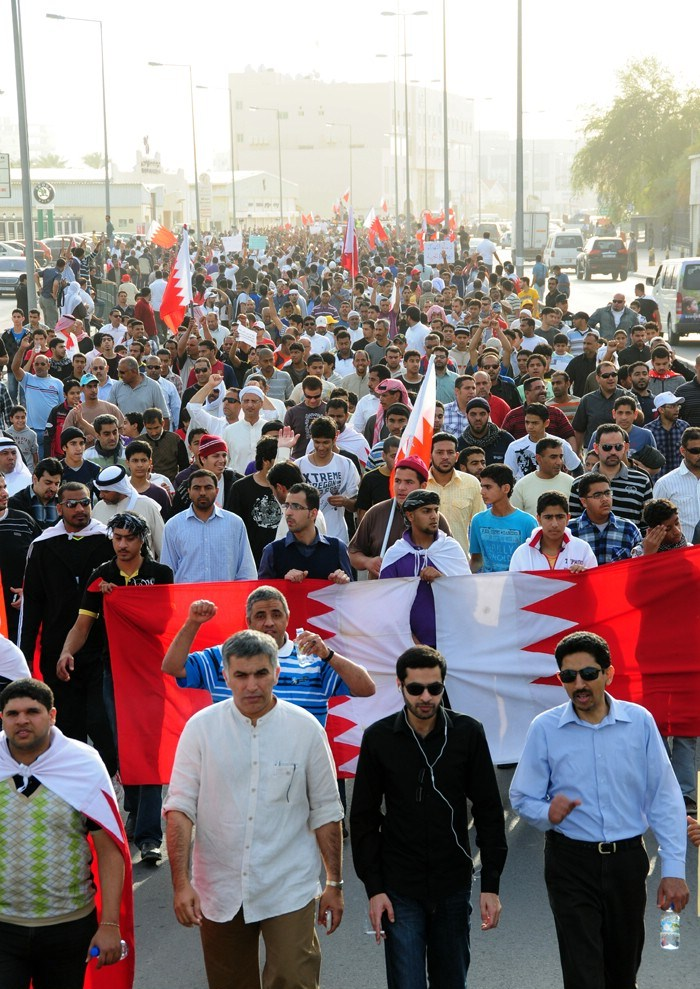
Abdulhadi al-Khawaja (right), Ali Abdulemam (middle) and Nabeel Rajab (left) in a pro-democracy march on 23 February

In the early days of the Arab Spring Revolutions of 2011, al-Khawaja led peaceful pro-democracy protests across the country and organized peaceful awareness-raising and human rights education activities for protesters.

In the period following attacks by Bahraini troops on protesters on 14 February 2011, the government allowed the protesters to continue a "festival-like" event at the Pearl Roundabout where a variety of groups came and shared their views. The Crown Prince promised to start a dialogue with the opposition following a visit to Bahrain by Robert Gates, Defense Secretary of the United States, to discuss the situation.

External videos
- Abdulhadi al-Khawaja speech (Arabic) in Pearl roundabout on 27 February on YouTube

After protesters entered the Financial Harbour, an area filled with financial exchanges and banks on 13 March 2011, the government began a violent crackdown in retaliation. A few days later, prominent opposition leader Hasan Mushaima and six other opposition activists were arrested.

=== Arrest ===
On 9 April 2011, al-Khawaja was arrested. His daughter reported how up to 20 armed and masked policemen broke into their apartment in the middle of the night and attacked her father. They dragged him downstairs by the neck, leaving a trail of blood from injuries inflicted by five officers who refused to stop beating him despite his claims that he was unable to breathe. He was taken away unconscious. Al-Khawaja's two sons-in-law were detained as well. Mohammed Al-Maskati, President of the Bahrain Youth Society for Human Rights (BYHRS), who had been monitoring human rights violations during the protests and was present in the house, was severely beaten during the raid but not arrested. Al-Khawaja's daughter, Zainab, was assaulted when she attempted to intervene. The women present in the house were locked in a room and prevented from leaving. The family were not told where al-Khawaja had been taken, or what he was accused of.

=== Torture ===
Sadly, all security apparatus in the Arab world have one thing in common - namely persecuting the thinkers and virtuous people based on their activism and work defending the rights of others. Among those is Abdulhadi, due to his defence of human rights activists.

— Haitham al-Maleh, Syrian human rights activist

Al-Khawaja has been detained since 9 April 2011 and has reportedly been subjected to physical and sexual torture. He required a four-hour operation in a military hospital following injuries to his head. Nabeel Rajab, current president of Bahrain Centre for Human Rights reported that al-Khawaja's jawbones had been smashed, and he had four fractures in his face; he was due to undergo a mandibular bone graft (using bone from his skull).

At a hearing on 16 May 2011, the judges refused to listen to his complaints of an attempted rape and again refused to order an investigation into torture. According to representatives of al-Khawaja's family who were able to speak with him briefly, he was only able to resist the attempt by four men to rape him by banging his already damaged head against a concrete floor. He is referred to as "Case No. 8." in the BICI report.

=== Trial and imprisonment ===
On 20 April 2011, Abdulhadi al-Khawaja was allowed to make a one-minute phone call to his wife. He informed her that he was supposed to appear before the Military Court at 8.00 a.m. on 21 April. Before this call, al-Khawaja's daughter had received a call from the military asking her to bring clothes for him. When his lawyers presented themselves before the Military Court, they were advised that the hearing was not going to take place that day. They were given no further information and were not allowed access to their client.

Eventually on 8 May 2011, al-Khawaja was put on trial by a military court with 20 other Bahrainis on charges of "organizing and managing a terrorist organization", "attempt to overthrow the Government by force and in liaison with a terrorist organization working for a foreign country" and the "collection of money for a terrorist group". The group, which included other noted Bahraini human rights campaigners including Hasan Mushaima and Abduljalil Alsingace, clerics and members of political opposition groups, were tried under emergency legislation introduced following the protest demonstrations in February and March. With the exception of one Sunni, Ibrahim Sharif, all were members of Bahrain's majority Shia community.

On 19 June, al-Khawaja wrote a letter (in Arabic) from prison about his health situation. On 22 June 2011, al-Khawaja and eight others were sentenced to life imprisonment. Zainab al-Khawaja, who attended the trial, "tweeted" that after the sentence was read, her father raised his fist and shouted "We shall continue on the path of peaceful resistance!", before being bustled out of the court room. Al-Khawaja's appeal is due to be heard on 11 September, when it will take place before an ordinary criminal court, rather than a military court.

=== Hunger strike ===
For the first time in Bahrain, al-Khawaja started an open-ended hunger strike starting on 8 February 2012 until "freedom or death" protesting continuing detentions. On 15 March he had lost more than 14 kilograms (31 lb), had problems talking and "could not stand up, even to perform his prayers," his daughter Maryam said. He was taken to hospital several times where doctors failed to administer him an IV line due to his veins' weak conditions, his family said. According to his wife, al-Khawaja spent most of his time lying down, needed hot water to keep his body's normal temperature, and became exhausted after 10–15 minutes of exposure to sunlight. As his health conditions kept declining, al-Khawaja refused medical examinations and threatened to stop drinking water. His deteriorating condition was confirmed by Danish diplomats who have made several visits to the prison he's held in. "Abdulhadi thinks there is no legal reason to keep him in jail," said his lawyer, al-Jishi, who also filed a last chance appeal. "He won't stop until they release him, or he will die inside," he added.

The government refused access to independent activists to examine him, stating that al-Khawaja's condition was stable and medical care was being provided. It also said he was not on a real hunger strike, because he was taking glucose and "other liquids".

Beginning on 20 April, al-Khawaja refused all fluids, including water and intravenous saline. He asked to see his lawyer to write a will, but was denied access for the fourth week. So he begged his wife to pass on three things: that he was completely convinced as to the rightness of his action and, could he go back, would choose the same path again; his appeal that no one attempt a similar strike to the death; and finally, "If I die, in the next 24 hrs, I ask the people to continue on the path of peaceful resistance... I don't want anybody to be hurt in my name." On 25 April (his 77th day of hunger strike), his wife learned he had disappeared from his hospital bed. Both the Ministry of Interior and the Bahrain Defense Force hospital refused information as to his whereabouts or treatment. On 29 April, it emerged that he had been drugged, tied to a bed, and forcibly fed with a nasoenteric tube. Al-Khawaja considered the force feeding and the solitary confinement to be torture; he gave the doctor's name as Dr Ebrahim Zuwayed, declared he will hold him, the hospital and the Ministry of Interior responsible, and that he was continuing with his hunger strike.

On 28 May, al-Khawaja announced through his lawyer that he would end his hunger strike that evening, on the strike's 110th day.

On 16 November 2021, Al-Khawaja started a hunger strike due to long and ongoing harassment by the prison authorities. On 18 November, he called his family to say his blood sugar level had dropped to a dangerously low level of 2.4.

On 29 October 2025, Al-Khawaja went on a new hunger strike.

=== International response ===
The trials and sentences have been criticized by governments and human rights organizations as unfair and politically motivated. The spokesperson for UN High Commissioner for Human Rights Navi Pillay said that there were serious concerns that the due process rights of the defendants, many of them well-known human rights defenders, had not been respected and the trials appeared to bear the marks of political persecution. The Office of the High Commissioner (OHCHR) called for an immediate cessation of trials of civilians in the Court of National Safety and the immediate release of all peaceful demonstrators arrested in the context of the February protest movement. The OHCHR had received "worrying" reports about the way up to 1,000 people reportedly remaining in detention were being treated and called on the Government to conduct an urgent independent investigation into allegations that four individuals had died in detention due to injuries resulting from severe torture.

The UK Foreign Office, noting that Ibrahim Sharif was a prominent moderate opposition politician who had been a constructive participant in Bahraini politics, expressed concern at the trial of civilians under martial law by tribunals chaired by a military judge, as well as reports of abuse in detention, lack of access to legal counsel and coerced confessions.

Amnesty International's Middle East and North Africa program director, Malcolm Smart, described the trials as patently unfair, emphasizing inadequate investigation of claims of torture and the use of false confessions as evidence. Summing up the situation, he said:

"These trials and convictions represent yet further evidence of the extent to which the rights to freedom of speech and assembly are now being denied in Bahrain. These 15 activists appear to have been sentenced to jail terms for doing no more than exercising their legitimate right to demonstrate against the government. If this is correct and they have been convicted solely because of their peaceful anti-government activities, they are prisoners of conscience who should be released immediately and unconditionally. The manner in which these trials were conducted – with civilian defendants brought before a secretive military court from which international observers have been barred is highly alarming. It is indicative of the diminishing space for human rights in Bahrain right now."

On 30 March 2012, the organization officially designated al-Khawaja a prisoner of conscience and demanded his immediate release.

Amid his hunger strike, the Danish foreign minister met with Bahrain's foreign minister in March 2012 and called for al-Khawaja's immediate release. Front Line Defenders launched a campaign demanding his immediate release. Sahrawi organizations including human rights defender Aminatou Haidar expressed their solidarity and support. More than 50 human rights organization appealed to the King of Bahrain to release al-Khawaja. On 9 April, UN Secretary-General Ban Ki-moon called for Bahrain to consider transferring al-Khawaja to Denmark for medical treatment, but Bahrain's Supreme Judicial Council refused on the grounds that the transfer would be a violation of Bahraini law. On 10 April, al-Khawaja's lawyer Mohammed al-Jeshi expressed his fears that al-Khawaja had died, as authorities were no longer allowing his family or legal counsel to see him.

The United States expressed concern for al-Khawaja's well-being and called on the Bahraini government to "consider urgently all available options to resolve his case."

On 1 May 2012, al-Khawaja told BBC correspondent Frank Gardner that he would continue the hunger strike. He said that the medical treatment which he was undergoing was good except the Bahraini officials were trying to force-feed him, an accusation the government instantly denied.

In March 2021, different human rights organizations across the globe called for the immediate release of al-Khawaja. A recent report by the Bahrain Center for Human Rights and Gulf Centre for Human Rights shows that al-Khawaja has been systematically tortured, physically, sexually abused and subjected to lengthy solitary confinement.

The European Parliament passed a resolution on the case of Abdulhadi al-Khawaja and urged the authorities of Bahrain to ensure that the rights of detainees are upheld at all times. The resolution called for the authorities to comply with international laws on fair trial. The European Parliament also expressed concerns citing the reports of ill-treatment and torture of prisoners. It also demanded the Bahraini government to immediately and unconditionally release al-Khawaja and other prisoners of conscience. The resolution also condemned the Jaw prison administration over the continuous human rights violations of al-Khawaja.

A senior Czech MEP, Tomáš Zdechovský was leading negotiations on behalf of his European People's Party, over the European Parliament's resolution concerning al-Khawaja. However, a report by The Guardian revealed that the MEP made an undeclared visit to Bahrain in April 2022. In an alternate resolution, Zdechovský's EPP didn't call for al-Khawaja's release, and rather called him a "political opponent". The centre-right group was accused of repeating what the "Bahraini government would say".

== See also ==
- Bahrain Centre for Human Rights
- Torture in Bahrain
- Islamic Action Society
- Bahrain Thirteen
- Nabeel Rajab
- Bobby Sands, of the 1981 Irish hunger strike
- Hana Shalabi
- Khader Adnan
- Maikel Nabil Sanad
