= Nedal al-Salman =

Bahraini human rights activist

- نضال السلمان
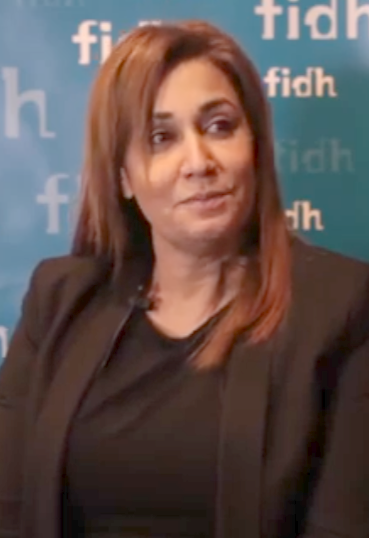
- In a 2015 interview
- Occupation: Activist
- Employer: Bahrain Centre for Human Rights

Nedal al-Salman (Arabic: نضال السلمان) is a Bahraini human rights activist. She is the president of the Bahrain Centre for Human Rights, a non-governmental organisation that is officially banned in Bahrain. As a result of al-Salman's activism, she has received various travel bans preventing her from leaving the country.

== Biography ==
Al-Salman first worked for the Bahrain Centre for Human Rights' women and children's rights advocacy service, and was one of the few activists working for the organisation to publicly identify herself. The organisation documents and reports on human rights in Bahrain. The BCHR was officially banned in Bahrain in 2004, and is registered in Denmark, though al-Salman continues to be based in Bahrain.

In addition to her role for BCHR, al-Salman is also a conveyor for IFEX, an international network of 119 non-governmental organisations promoting freedom of expression, as well as the vice president of the International Federation of Human Rights. Al-Salman is an associate member of human rights groups including Civicus, the Association for Women's Rights in Development, the Global Network for Civil Society Organisations, the WHRDMENA Coalition, and Defence for Children International.

Al-Salman has been particularly critical of the gendered targeting of female activists in Bahrain by attacking their personal lives to bring shame against them and their families. She has also criticised the increasing influence of Saudi Arabia on the Bahrain government which she believes had led to a decline in women's rights. Al-Salman described the relative prominence of women in governance, administration and diplomacy in Bahrain compared to other Gulf countries as being "cosmetic" in nature.

From 2016 until 2019, al-Salman was placed under a series of travel bans that prevented her from leaving Bahrain. Al-Salman stated that she was never formally told why the ban was made, and nor why it was lifted. Al-Salman first became aware of the ban on 26 August 2016 when she attempted to leave Bahrain to attend the 33rd session of the United Nations Human Rights Council in Geneva, Switzerland. On 16 November 2016, she was interrogated by agents from the Terrorism Law Court, and was charged with "illegal assembly" linked to the country's new Anti-Terrorism Law. Al-Salman underwent additional travel bans in March and June 2017, both of which prevented al-Salman from attending meetings pertaining to the UNHRC. On 26 November 2017, al-Salman was stopped at Bahrain International Airport and once again prevented from travelling; she had been scheduled to attend an IFEX meeting in Toronto, Canada before travelling onto Brussels, Belgium as a guest at the 19th European Union-NGO Human Rights Forum.

In addition to receiving multiple travel bans, al-Salman also reported to the United Nations Forum on Business and Human Rights that Pegasus spyware on her mobile phone had been used to spy on her.

== Response ==
Front Line Defenders criticised the travel bans made against al-Salman as being "solely motivated by [her] peaceful and legitimate activities in defence of human rights in Bahrain". The IFEX Network also called on the travel ban to be lifted to allow her to work free from "all forms of harassment and interference". The Observatory for the Protection of Human Rights Defenders called on Bahraini authorities to "immediately and unconditionally" lift the travel restrictions.
