= Lina Ben Mhenni =

Tunisian political activist (1983–2020)

Lina Ben Mhenni لينا بن مهني
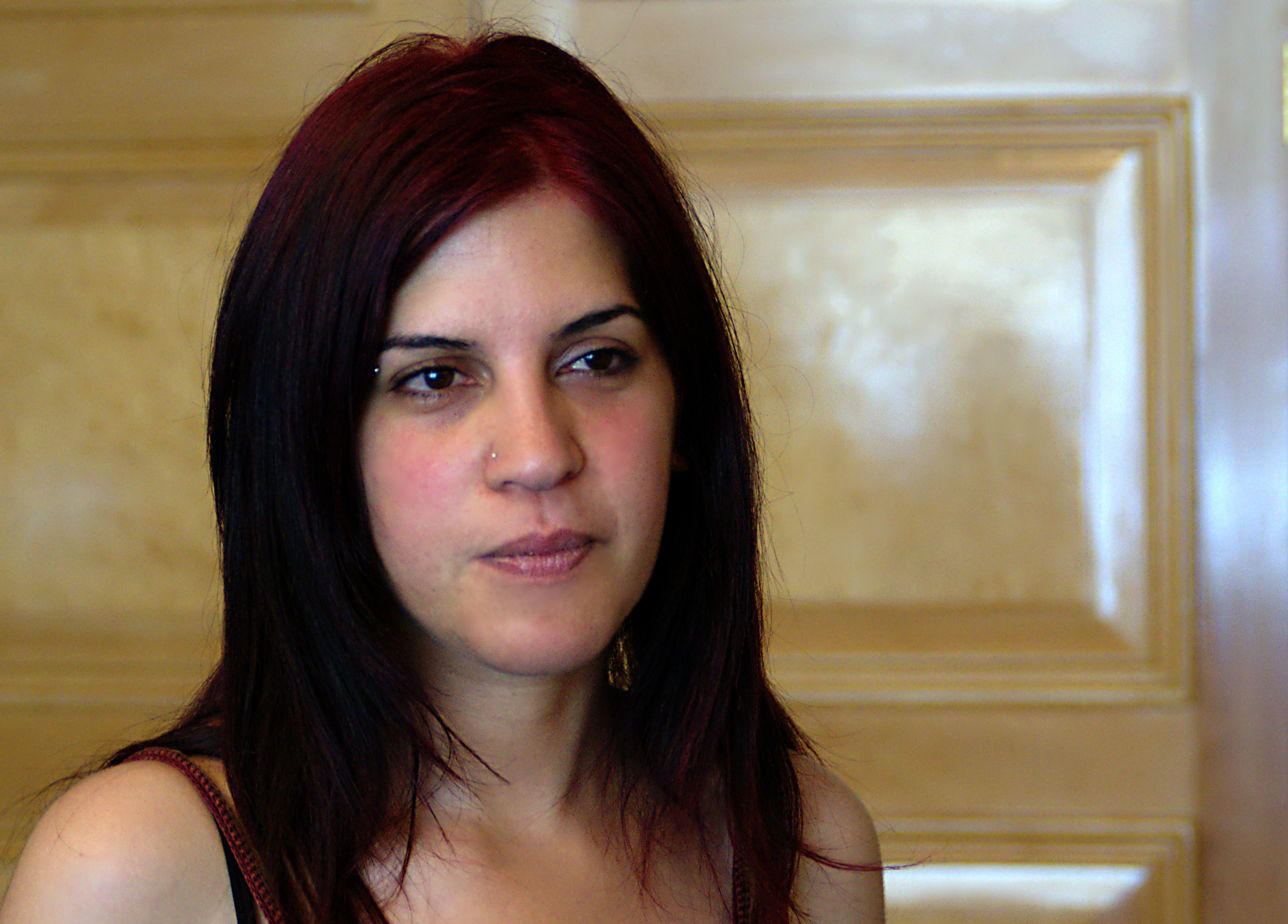
- Lina Ben Mhenni in 2013
- Born: 22 May 1983; Tunisia
- Died: 27 January 2020 (aged 36); Tunisia
- Occupations: Blogger; lecturer

Lina Ben Mhenni (Arabic: لينا بن مهني; 22 May 1983 – 27 January 2020) was a Tunisian Internet activist, blogger and lecturer in linguistics at Tunis University. She was internationally recognised for her work during the 2011 Tunisian revolution and in the following years.

== Activism ==
A 2014 interview with Ben Mhenni

=== Blogging ===
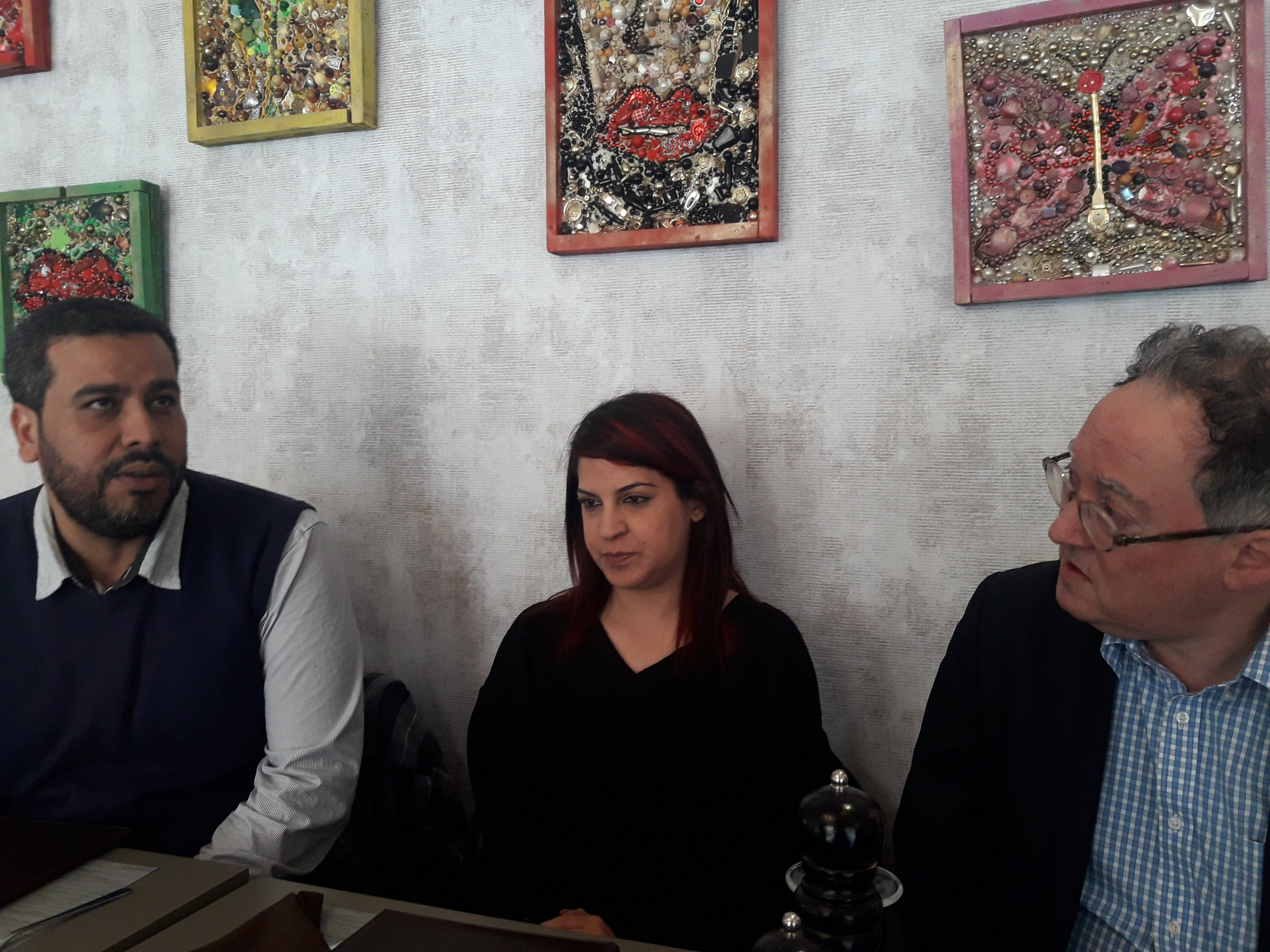
Ben Mhenni with fellow blogger Wissem Tlili and British journalist Gideon Rachman in 2018

Ben Mhenni's blog, A Tunisian Girl, is written in Arabic, English, and French. During the rule of former Tunisian President Zine El Abidine Ben Ali until 2011, Ben Mhenni was one of the few bloggers to blog using her real name rather than adopting a pseudonym to protect her identity. Her blog, as well as her Facebook and Twitter accounts, were censored under the Ben Ali regime.

Ben Mhenni began posting photos and video of protests of those injured throughout Tunisia. In an effort to make the government responsible for its actions and to the people who were harmed in these uprisings, she visited local hospitals and took pictures of those harmed by police.

=== Tunisian Revolution ===
In May 2010, Ben Mhenni was among the core organizers of a protest in Tunis against the government's suppression of media and censorship of the internet.

In January 2011, she covered the early weeks of the Tunisian Revolution from Sidi Bouzid Governorate in the interior of the country. Ben Mhenni was the only blogger present in the interior cities of Kasserine and Regueb when government forces massacred and suppressed protesters in the region. Her reports and posts provided uncensored information to other Tunisian activists and the international media.

=== Continued activism ===
Since the Tunisian Revolution began and until she died, Ben Mhenni played a prominent role amongst Tunisia's bloggers and democracy activists. She participated in the interim government's reforms to media and information laws, but resigned shortly after. She continued to work in tracking press freedom and human rights in the country.

She was vocal against continuing corruption in the Tunisian regime, criticized the Islamist party Ennahda for a "double discourse" that espoused reactionary views on social media while its leaders presented a different image to traditional media, and demanded the release of Alaa Abdel-Fatah upon his arrest in October 2011. In a 2014 editorial for CNN, she wrote that her activism after Ben Ali's overthrow had led to her receiving death threats and requiring close protection of the police.

Ben Mhenni stated that Tunisia's revolution "cannot be called an internet revolution", and insisted that the revolution against Ben Ali was fought "on the ground" through demonstrations and resistance. She also stated her belief that "action in the digital world must be combined with actions in the real world." She was quoted as saying: “It is not enough to publish a status, or a video, or share a hashtag. You have to work in the field, meet people, and be present during the demonstrations.”

She continued to act on her words until she died. Along with her father, she started an initiative to create libraries in prisons to promote culture and counter terrorism. In her final months, she denounced the state of hospitals in the Tunisian capital.

== Personal life ==
Ben Mhenni's parents were both activists; her father, Sadok, was a political prisoner, and her mother Emna was part of the student union movement. Ben Mhenni suffered from Lupus. In 2007, she received a kidney transplant from her mother and became very vocal about the importance of organ donation. In 2007 and 2009, she participated in the World Transplant Games, winning several medals.

== Recognition ==
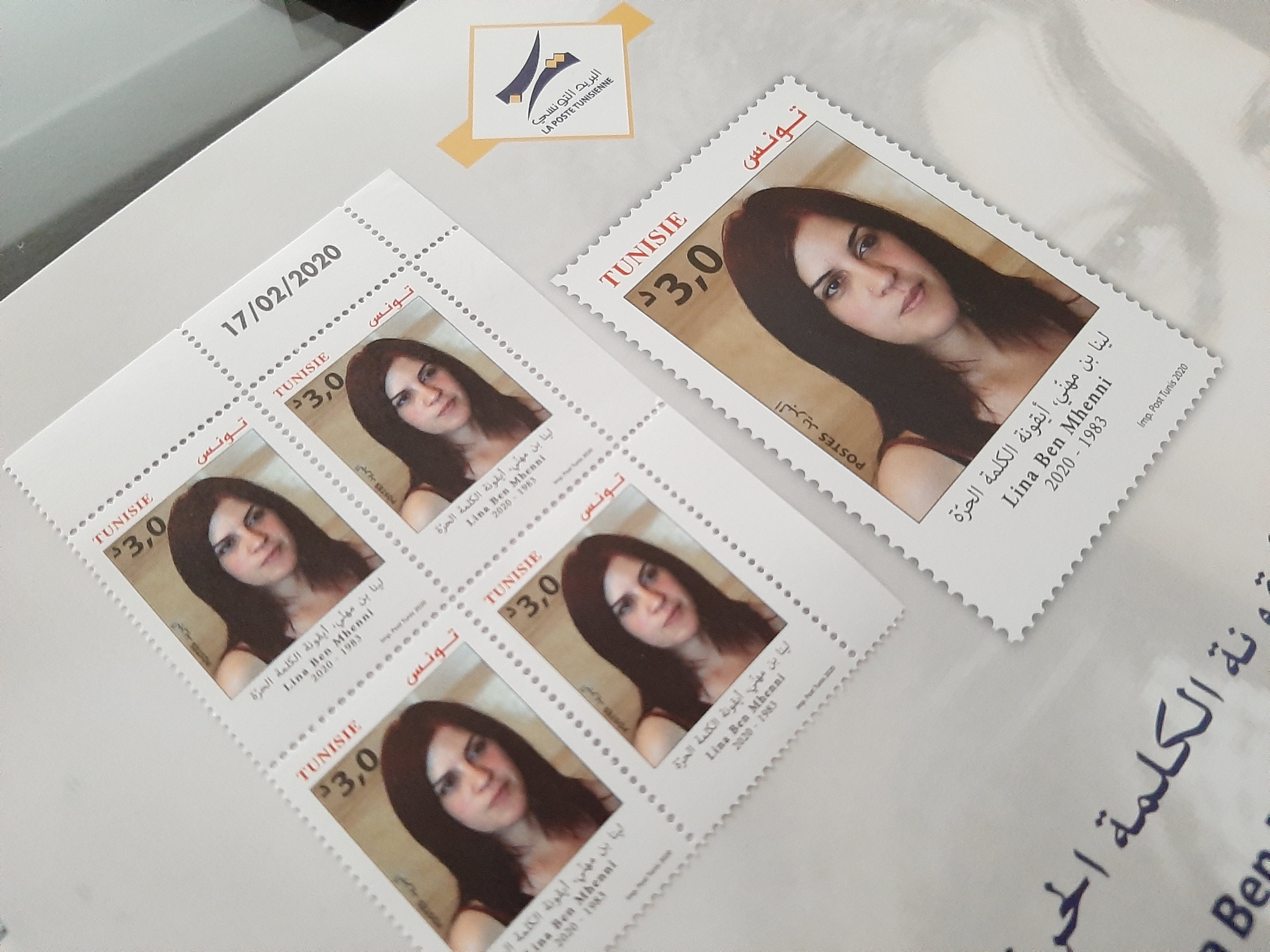
Stamps with Ben Mhenni's portrait

In 2011, Ben Mhenni was reported to have been a candidate for the Nobel Peace Prize for her contributions and activism during the Tunisian Revolution, along with Egyptian human rights defenders Israa Abdel Fattah and Wael Ghonim.

In October 2011, she won El Mundo's International Journalism Prize for her "fight for freedom".

She was awarded the Deutsche Welle International Blog Award for "A Tunisian Girl" in April 2011. The awards were presented as part of the Deutsche Welle Global Media Forum on 20 June 2011 in Bonn, Germany. "I'll continue my work and try to protect the fruits of the revolution”, she said during the ceremony.

In November 2012, she was awarded the Sean MacBride Peace Prize by the International Peace Bureau (IPB).

On 3 March 2020, La Poste Tunisienne published a stamp with her portrait. It is part of a series of stamps aimed at honouring those who have fought for the liberty of expression, for free access to the internet, and for human rights.

In May 2020, The Delegation of the European Union to Tunisia launched the Prix Lina Ben Mhenni pour la liberté d’expression (The Lina Ben Mhenni Prize for the Liberty of Expression). It will honour the best articles defending the principles and values of democracy, the freedoms and rights shared by Tunisia and the European Union.

== Works ==
- Tunisian Girl: Blogueuse pour un printemps arabe (french), Tunis: Indigene, 2011, ISBN 2911939875
- Vernetzt Euch! (german) [Tunisian Girl – Blogueuse pour un printemps arabe], Patricia Klobusiczky (trans.), Berlin: Ullstein Verlag, 2011, ISBN 978-3-550-08893-3

== Death ==
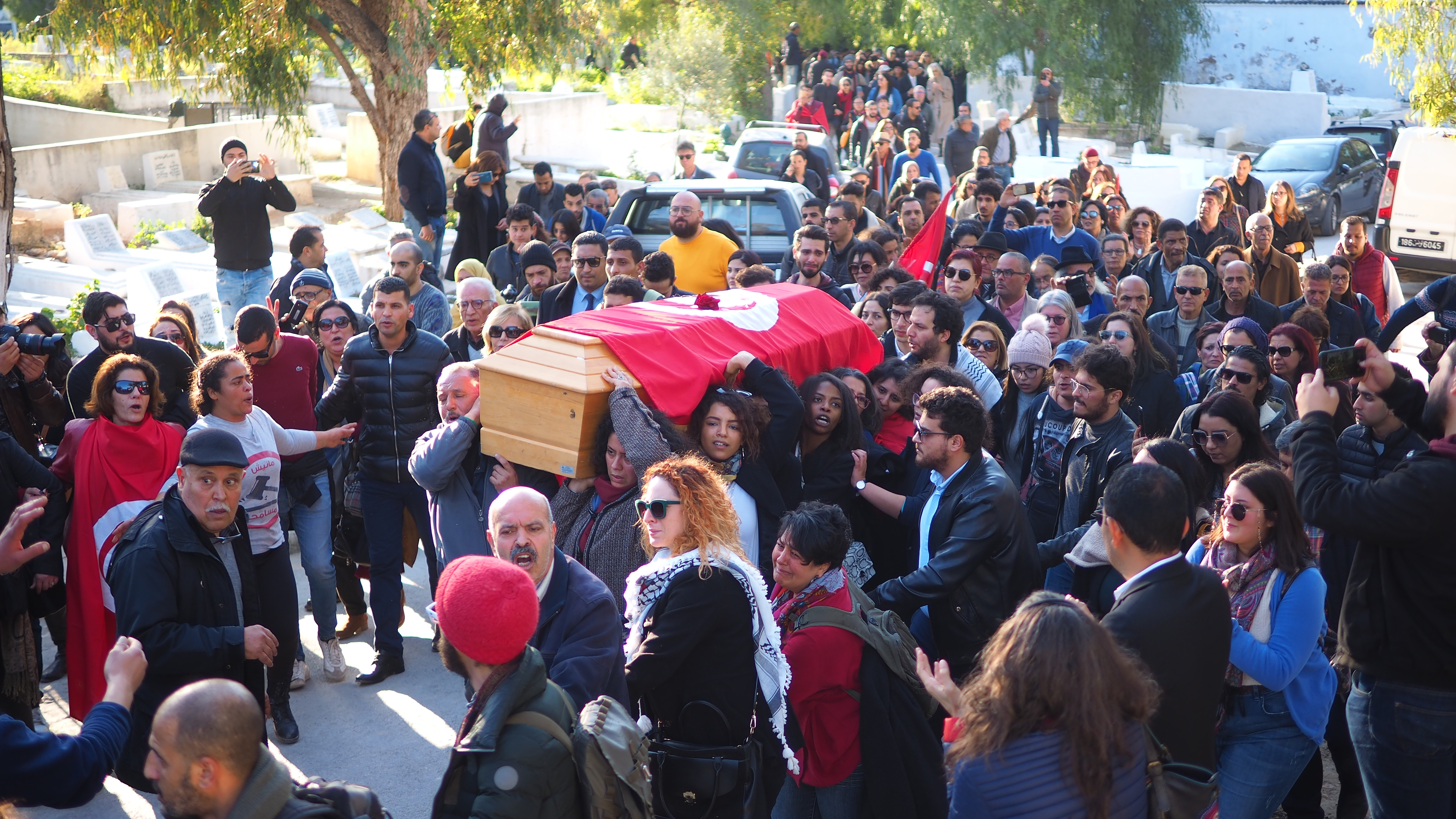
Ben Mhenni's funeral procession

Ben Mhenni died on 27 January 2020, aged 36, in a hospital, was caused by a stroke resulting from complications of an autoimmune disease. Media outlets from different countries highlighted the relevance of her work and contribution to the human rights struggle in the country and the region.

== See also ==
- Tunisian revolution
- Arab Spring
- Amira Yahyaoui
- Slim Amamou
- Zine El Abidine Ben Ali
- Mohammed Bouazizi
- Randa Kassis
- List of conflicts in Africa
- History of Tunisia
- Global Voices
