= Maryam al-Khawaja =

Bahraini human rights activist

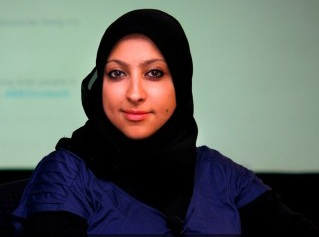
- Alkhawaja during BBC interview
- Born: 26 June 1987 (age 39); Syria
- Education: University of Bahrain BA in English Literature and American Studies
- Occupation: Human rights defender
- Years active: 2007–present
- Parent(s): Abdulhadi al-Khawaja; Khadija Almousawi
- Relatives: Zainab al-Khawaja (sister)
- Website: http://www.gc4hr.org/

Maryam Abdulhadi Al-Khawaja (Arabic: مريم عبد الهادي الخواجة, romanized: Maryam ʻAbd al-Hādī al-Khawājah; born 26 June 1987) is a Bahraini-Danish human rights activist. She is the daughter of the Bahraini human rights activist Abdulhadi al-Khawaja and a leading voice for human rights and political reform in Bahrain and the Gulf region. She has been influential in shaping official responses to human rights atrocities in Bahrain and the Gulf region by leading campaigns and engaging with prominent policymakers around the world.

Since 2022, she has served as the Executive Director of the Free Al Khawaja Campaign that advocates and works for the release of her father.

She is the former Co-Director and Special Advisor on Advocacy at the Gulf Center for Human Rights (GCHR), Co-Director of Frida - Young Feminist Fund, and the Europe Director and Interim Advocacy Director at Physicians for Human Rights. She has worked as a consultant with various NGOs and has served as a board member for CIVICUS, International Service for Human Rights, No Hiding Place, Urgent Action Fund and as the Co-Chair of the Board of Advisors for Digital Democracy Initiative.

== Early life ==
Al-Khawaja was born in Syria to human rights activists Khadija Almousawi and Abdulhadi Al-Khawaja, who had been rendered stateless due to his work promoting democracy and basic freedoms in Bahrain. At the age of two her family obtained political asylum in Denmark and later citizenship. They lived there until 2001, when they were allowed re-entry into Bahrain.

After graduating from the University of Bahrain in 2009, Al-Khawaja spent a year in the United States on a Fulbright scholarship at Brown University. When she returned to Bahrain in mid-2010, she joined the Bahrain Centre for Human Rights, co-founded by her father, where she headed the foreign relations office and became vice president, serving as acting president during BCHR's president, Nabeel Rajab's, periods of detention.

On 22 June 2011, Al-Khawaja's father was sentenced to life imprisonment in a military court on the charge of "organizing and managing a terrorist organization" and planning to overthrow the government for his role in the pro-democracy 2011-2012 Bahraini uprising. His arrest and imprisonment is considered arbitrary and against international law by the United Nations. Human Rights Watch later dissected the case brought against Abdulhadi Al-Khawaja and the evidence he was forced to sign under torture.

== Career ==
=== Human rights activism ===
Al-Khawaja was active in participating in protests and volunteering for human rights organizations since she was a young teenager. She also worked as a fixer and translator for journalists who came to Bahrain to report on the situation there. In 2006, Al-Khawaja was part of the delegation that went to the UN building in New York City and met with the Secretary-General's assistant to hand over the mass petition of demanding that the Prime Minister resign, due to his human rights violations. In 2008, Al-Khawaja was invited by the Tom Lantos Human Rights Commission to testify at US Congress about religious freedom in Bahrain. The government led a smear campaign in the media against the group of activists that spoke at this session including Al-Khawaja, and their case was adopted by organizations such as Frontline, World Organisation Against Torture (OMCT) and International Federation for Human Rights (FIDH).

In February 2024, Al-Khawaja revealed that she was diagnosed with Hodgkin's Lymphoma, stage three blood cancer, and started a sit-in in front of the Danish Parliament calling for the release of her father and for a ceasefire in Gaza.

=== Involvement in the Bahraini uprising ===
External videos
- Maryam al-Khawaja's participation in Oslo Freedom forum in May 2011 on YouTube

After actively participating in the organizing of the early pro-democracy demonstrations in 2011, Al-Khawaja embarked on an overseas speaking tour at colleges and conferences. During this tour, she held meetings with UK politicians, and spoke to the United Nations Human Rights Council in Geneva. With Nabeel Rajab prevented from leaving Bahrain, problems of access for the external media and at least 500 leading members of the opposition detained, al-Khawaja assumed a prominent public role outside Bahrain. According to Joe Stork of Human Rights Watch, BCHR recommended that she stay abroad given the likelihood of arrest if she returned.

In April 2011, al-Khawaja participated in the U.S.-Islamic World Forum, where she was able to speak to then Secretary of State Hillary Clinton and tell the story of her father and two brothers-in-law arrest. She implored Clinton for the United States to take a stronger stance against the oppression in Bahrain, and cited the Bahraini government's use of American weapons to suppress the protesters, as a reason for the United States to do so. In May 2011, she spoke to the Oslo Freedom Forum about her experiences with government violence in Bahrain. On 13 May 2011, she gave evidence to a U.S. Congress hearing on Human Rights in Bahrain.

==== Online activity ====
Before the Bahraini uprising, Al-Khawaja was not active on Twitter, with no more than 30 followers. As of September 2026, she has more than 106,700 followers and has sent more than 60,000 tweets, providing coverage of various protests often overlooked by many formal news agencies. As demonstrators flooded the streets, she stayed for days on end in Manama's Pearl Roundabout actively tweeting.

In May 2026, the Danish Broadcasting Corporation (DR) released an investigative podcast series about Abdulhadi Al-Khawaja. The series featured Maryam Al-Khawaja alongside former Danish Foreign Ministers Villy Søvndal (SF) and Martin Lidegaard (RV).

== Threats and harassment ==
Al-Khawaja has faced internet harassment from regime supporters. She did not attend an IFEX in Lebanon in early June after receiving death threats. Immediately after her speech to the Oslo Freedom Forum (streamed live online) a Twitter campaign began, accusing her of spreading false news, being a radical and working for the Iranian government. Many messages accusing Al-Khawaja of being a "traitor" for Bahrain were sent to the email account of Oslo Freedom Forum. Much of the tweeting, blogging and online harassment has originated in the U.S., inside the Geo-Political Solutions division of Qorvis Communications. The campaign has also included apparently organized heckling.

According to FIDH, in early May 2011, an anonymous smear campaign was launched against Nabeel Rajab and Al-Khawaja "with the active support of the Bahraini authorities".

On 30 August 2014, while traveling to visit her father in Manama, Al-Khawaja was arrested and charged with assaulting a police officer. She was released on bail and left Bahrain on 2 October 2014, boycotting her trial. In December, she was sentenced in absentia to one year in prison. Bahrain maintains that al-Khawaja's arrest is valid. She currently has an outstanding arrest warrant, and has four pending cases, one of which is filed under the Terrorism Law and could carry a life sentence or the death penalty.

On September 15, 2023, Maryam al-Khawaja was blocked by British Airways at London Heathrow Airport from boarding a flight to Bahrain. She intended to travel to Manama to advocate for her imprisoned father with an international human rights delegation consisting of Amnesty International’s Secretary General Agnès Callamard; Olive Moore and Andrew Anderson, who are former directors of Front Line Defenders; and Timothy Whyte, Secretary General of ActionAid Denmark.

== Awards ==
Maryam Al-Khawaja has received numerous awards for her human rights work, including Freedom House’ Freedom Award and the Rafto Prize. She was also nominated for the Nobel Peace Prize in 2013 along with her father and sister.

In November 2023, Al-Khawaja was named to the BBC's 100 Women list.
