= Bahrain Youth Society for Human Rights =

Bahraini youth organisation

Bahrain Youth Society for Human Rights جمعية شباب البحرين لحقوق الإنسان
- Founded: 2005
- Type: Non-profit; NGO
- Location: Manama (Bahrain)
- Website: Official website

The Bahrain Youth Society for Human Rights (BYSHR; Arabic: جمعية شباب البحرين لحقوق الإنسان, romanized: Jamʻīyat Shabāb al-Baḥrayn li-Ḥuqūq al-Insān) is a human rights organization of Bahrain founded in March 2005 which was active in the Bahraini uprising. The group "organises training workshops, monitors and documents human rights violations and participates in forming a regional network for young human rights activists in eight Arab countries". Mohammed al-Maskati serves as its president. The organization was founded by Mohammed al-Maskati and Hussain Jawad (who also served as its vice-president) among others.

== Early history ==
The group's activities have included protesting for the freedom of Egyptian blogger Kareem Amer as well as reporting on domestic human trafficking in Bahrain.

In June 2005, the BYSHR attempted to register as a non-governmental organization with the Bahraini government, but was refused. When the group nonetheless continued its work, al-Maskati was summoned to court in 2007 on charges of leading an "unregistered organization", which carried a maximum sentence of six months imprisonment. The International Freedom of Expression Exchange issued an appeal for a letter-writing campaign on his behalf, describing the arrest as "just the latest example of the government using judicial measures to silence human rights activists". Al-Maskati's trial was later postponed until 2009. In June 2010, he was found guilty and ordered to pay a fine of 500 Bahraini dinar. The Bahrain Centre for Human Rights protested the sentence, describing it as "a continuation of the Authority's policy in Bahrain to restrict civil society institutions".

== Role in the Bahraini uprising ==
In February 2011, Bahrain saw a series of large-scale pro-democracy protests as part of the Arab Spring. The BYSHR were active at the capital Manama's Pearl Roundabout, which quickly became a center for the protests. Among the protestors' demands were a new constitution and the replacement of Prime Minister Khalifa bin Salman Al Khalifa—an uncle of Bahrain's king who had held the post since 1971—with an elected official.

On 1 June, following the end of eleven weeks of martial law, the group participated in a series of coordinated protests across Bahrain, particularly in Shiite-majority villages unhappy with Bahrain's Sunni royal family.
