= Mohammed al-Maskati =

Mohammed Al-Maskati
- محمد المسقطي
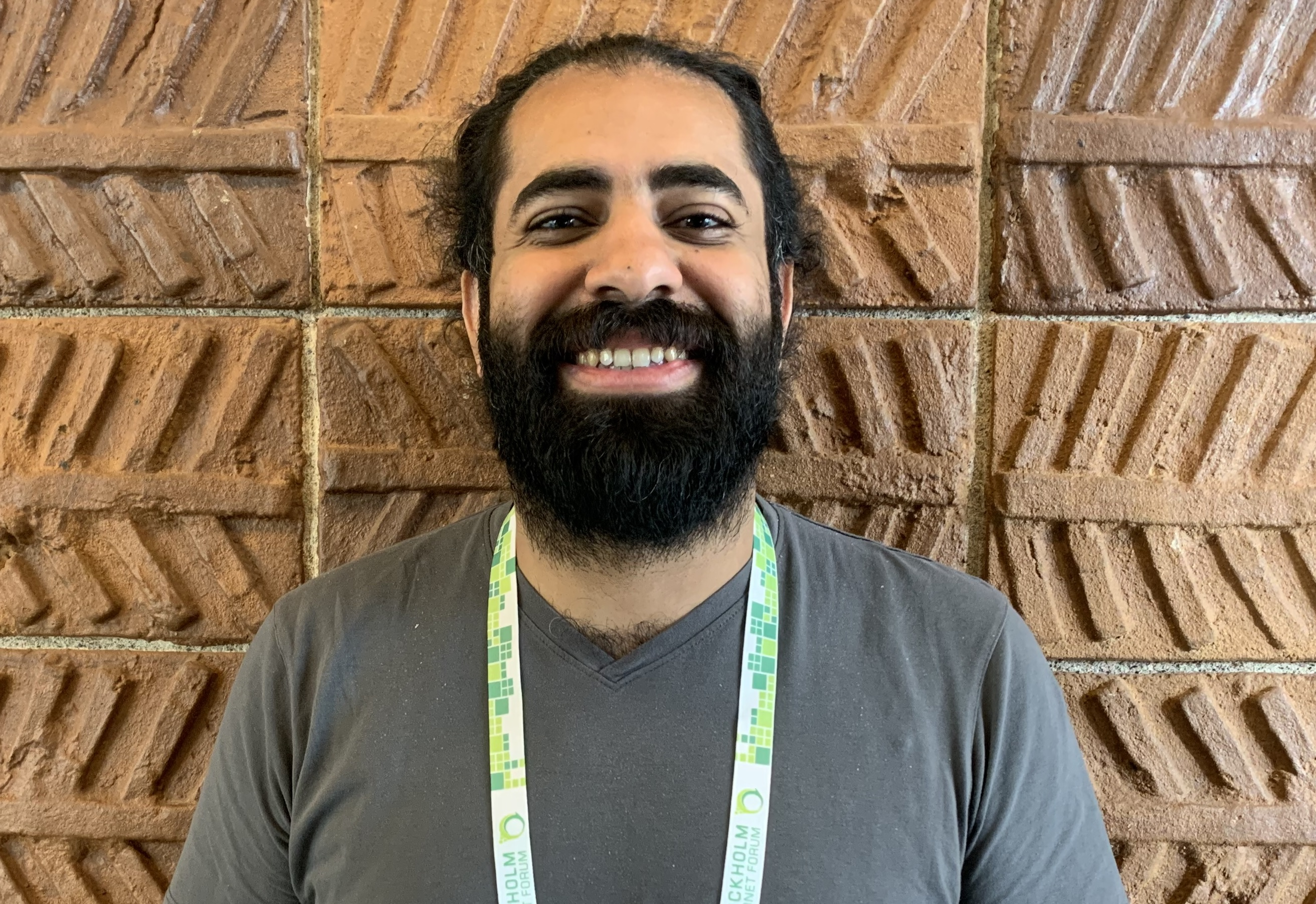
- Mohammed Al-Maskati in Stockholm 2019
- Occupation: Bahraini activist
- Title: Digital Security Helpline Director at Access Now Former Digital Protection Coordinator for the Middle East and North Africa at Front Line Defenders Former President of the Bahrain Youth Society for Human Rights (BYSHR)
- Website: Twitter account

Mohammed Al-Maskati (Arabic:محمد المسقطي) is a Bahraini human rights activist and Digital Security Helpline Director at Access Now. Formerly Digital Protection Coordinator for the Middle East and North Africa region at Front Line Defenders.He is the founder of the Bahrain Youth Society for Human Rights (BYSHR), a leading group in the 2011-2012 Bahraini uprising. He was shortlisted in Index on Censorship’s Freedom of Expression Awards 2019 and Security Serious Unsung Heroes Awards 2020. He was a member of the panel of experts for the Dutch Government Tulip Prize for Human Rights 2021. He discovered phone hacking of human rights defenders and journalists in Palestine, Bahrain and Jordan.

== Formation of BYSHR and charges ==
Al-Maskati served as the president of the BYSHR, an organization which "organises training workshops, monitors and documents human rights violations and participates in forming a regional network for young human rights activists in eight Arab countries". As part of the group's work, al-Maskati lobbied for the freedom of Egyptian blogger Kareem Amer as well as reporting on domestic human trafficking in Bahrain.

In June 2005, the BYSHR's attempt to register as a non-governmental organization with the Bahraini government was refused. When the group nonetheless continued its work, Al-Maskati was summoned to court in 2007 on charges of leading an "unregistered organization", which carried a maximum sentence of six months imprisonment. The International Freedom of Expression Exchange issued an appeal for a letter writing campaign on his behalf, describing the arrest as "just the latest example of the government using judicial measures to silence human rights activists". Al-Maskati's trial was later postponed until 2009, In June 2010, Al-Maskati was found guilty and ordered to pay a fine of 500 Bahraini dinar (about 1000 euros). The Bahrain Centre for Human Rights protested the sentence, describing it as "a continuation of the Authority's policy in Bahrain to restrict civil society institutions".

== Role in 2011-2012 Bahraini uprising ==
In February 2011, Bahrain saw a series of large-scale pro-democracy protests as part of the international Arab Spring. Al-Maskati and the BYSHR were active at Pearl Roundabout in the capital of Manama, which quickly became a center for the protests. Among the protestors' demands were a new constitution and the replacement of Prime Minister Khalifa bin Salman Al Khalifa—an uncle of Bahrain's king who had held the post since 1971—with an elected official. In March, he was named in a widely circulated text message death threat, causing Amnesty International to call on Bahraini authorities to investigate and provide him police protection. As a result, he received a number of death threats by telephone.

On 9 April, Al-Maskati was present for a pre-dawn raid on the home of Bahrain Centre for Human Rights co-founder Abdulhadi al-Khawaja, by masked policemen. Al-Maskati alleges that the arresting officers struck him and placed a boot on his neck after he was handcuffed and lying face-down on the ground, but later released him after recognizing his name. Al-Khawaja was taken to prison.

On 1 June, following the end of eleven weeks of martial law, Al-Maskati helped organize a series of coordinated protests across Bahrain, particularly in Shiite-majority villages unhappy with Bahrain's Sunni royal family. In late 2011, Al-Maskati was arrested for his "cyberdissidence" but later released; the arrest was protested in Reporters Without Borders' Internet Enemies report. In December, he was again the target of a death threat, this time by Adel Flaifel, a former State Security Services official writing on Twitter.

In February 2012, Al-Maskati participated in the one-year anniversary of the Pearl Roundabout protests, reporting to international news agencies by phone that police were "storming houses suspected of harboring demonstrators, using tear gas, closing roads and arresting people".
