= Bahrain Centre for Human Rights =

Non-profit non-governmental organisation

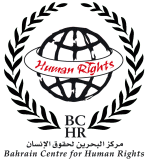
- Founded: May 2002 by a group of activists in Bahrain
- Dissolved: September 2004
- Type: Non-profit; NGO
- Location: Bahrain
- Services: Protecting human rights
- Fields: Media attention, non-violence, research, lobbying
- Key people: Nedal al-Salman (President); Nabeel Rajab (former president); Abdulhadi Alkhawaja (former president); Maryam Alkhawaja (Head of the Foreign Relations Office)
- Website: www.bahrainrights.net

The Bahrain Centre for Human Rights (BCHR; Arabic: مركز البحرين لحقوق الإنسان, romanized: Markaz al-Baḥrayn li-Ḥuqūq al-Insān) was a Bahraini non-profit non-governmental organisation founded by Bahraini activists in 2002 and working to promote human rights in Bahrain. The centre was given a dissolution order after its former president Abdulhadi Al Khawaja was arrested in September 2004 a day after criticizing the country's Prime Minister, Khalifah ibn Sulman Al Khalifah at a seminar in which he blamed the Prime Minister for the failure of widespread economic development for all citizens. The BCHR is still banned by the government, but has remained very active.

In 2013 the organisation was awarded the Rafto Prize for its work.

== History ==
=== Foundation ===
In June 2002 the Bahrain Centre for Human Rights was founded by Abdulhadi Alkhawaja, Nabeel Rajab, Abdulaziz Abul and others

=== 2004 dissolution ===
On 25 September 2004 the BCHR was closed down and Alkhawaja was arrested a day after publicly criticizing the Prime Minister and the Bahraini regime for corruption and human rights abuses. In November 2005 a court sentenced AlKhawaja to one year in prison on charges which included "inciting hatred" and accusing authorities of corruption, under provisions prescribed by the 1976 Penal Code.

On the morning of 21 November, the court sentenced Alkhawaja to one year in prison, but later in the day it was announced that he had been given a Royal Pardon by the King and was released.

Although its license was revoked, the BCHR is still functioning after gaining wide internal and external support for its struggle to promote human rights in Bahrain. According to Human Rights Watch, as of 2011 "The government continues to deny legal status to the BCHR, which it ordered dissolved in 2004 after the group's then-president criticized the prime minister for corruption and human rights violations."

The current President is Nedal AlSalman after ex-president Nabeel Rajab, who served a 5-year prison sentence due to tweeting and founder AbdulhadiAl-Khawaja, in jail for 13 years for freedom of opinion case.

== Defamation campaigns, threats and harassment ==
Members of BCHR have been the subject of ongoing harassment including physical attacks and smear campaigns in the media. They include Abdulhadi Alkhawaja, Nabeel Rajab, Maryam Alkhawaja, and Yousif al-Mahafdha.

== Relationship with other human rights groups ==
According to leaked US embassy cables the US ambassador to Bahrain, Adam Ereli, in 2010 noted that human rights organisations including Freedom House and Human Rights Watch relied too much on Rajab and the BCHR for their information on Bahrain. In January 2010, after Freedom House classified Bahrain as "not free" in its 2010 global survey of political rights and civil liberties, Ereli stated that the BCHR "likely had undue influence over the Freedom House researchers, who may not have cast a very wide net during their in-country consultations".

== See also ==
- Human rights in Bahrain
- History of Bahrain
- Torture in Bahrain
