= Prisons in Bahrain =

Prisons in Bahrain are fully owned and operated by the state. They are run by 3 different security forces: the National Security Agency (NSA), the Bahrain Defence Force (BDF), and the Ministry of Interior (MoI). Administration of prisons is overseen by several judicial authorities, as well as the public prosecution. Out of a total of 20 prisons, there are 4 main prisons, one of which is for women. The main prisons are: Al Qurain Prison (run by BDF), Dry Dock Detention Center, Juw Prison, and Isa Town Detention Center for women (run by MoI).

During the periods 1975-1999 and 2007–2011, torture in prisons became widespread and systematic , leading to the deaths of up to 23 individuals.

== Detention of juveniles ==
Until recently (late 2011), children older than fifteen (but under 18) were tried in a criminal court rather than in juvenile court. In 2001, the UN Working Group on Arbitrary Detention recommended that "all juvenile detention centers run by the Ministry of Interior be transferred to the Ministry of Social Development". As of 2010, this recommendation hadn't been implemented despite the Council of Ministers' decisions on 4 December 2005 to make the transfer. In 2011, some children were brought in front of martial courts.

During security crackdowns on political and human rights activists in August 2010, 76 children were reportedly arrested, including a ten-year-old child. In total, 355 individuals were detained of whom 21% were children. The Bahrain Centre for Human Rights said that the NSA was behind most of the arrests and "continuous physical assaults" on the children. Authorities claimed that most of the children arrested were engaged in protests and protest-related activities such as tire burning. Children were reportedly held in the same detention centers as adult prisoners being tried on criminal accusations such as illegal drug distribution. Lawyers reported that some children had suffered beatings and showed marks of torture, and two children had complained about mistreatment during the trial.

The BCHR has documented 188 cases of child arrests during the Bahraini uprising which were described as "unlawful and many cases fall under kidnapping or abduction". Almost all of them reported mistreatment while in detention and some were transported to hospitals after being detained and had torture marks. They were allegedly psychologically abused and two of them reported being sexually assaulted.

== Political prisoners ==
The Bahrain Centre for Human Rights reported that 500 individuals were prisoners of conscience as of 22 November 2011, making Bahrain the top country globally in political prisoners per capita. This claim is supported by legislation which prescribes a prison sentence for anyone who "calls in writing for overthrowing or changing the regime", or "incites with the use of one of the publication methods to develop hatred of the ruling regime or show contempt towards it".

== Mistreatment ==
During the period between 1975 and 1999 known as the "State Security Law Era", torture was frequently used by the Bahraini government and resulted in the deaths of 17 individuals. After Emir Hamad bin Isa Al Khalifa succeeded his father Isa bin Salman Al Khalifa in 1999, reports of torture declined dramatically and conditions of detention improved. However Royal Decree 56 of 2002 gave effective immunity to all those accused of torture during the 1990s uprising and before (including notorious figures such as Ian Henderson and Adel Flaifel). Towards the end of 2007 torture began to be employed again and by 2010 had again become common.

=== 2011–2012 uprising ===
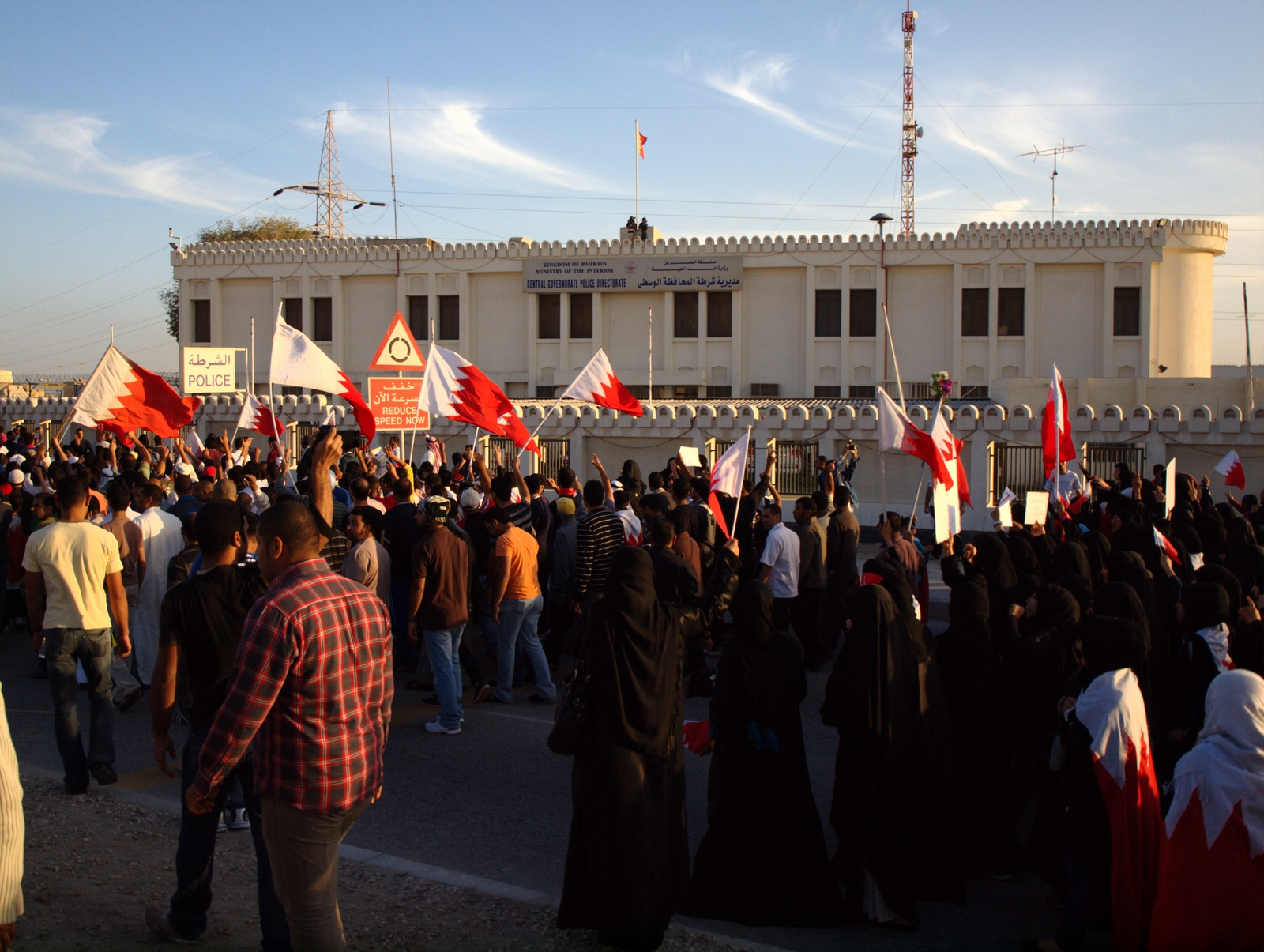
Hundreds marching nearby Al Wusta police station in March 2011

Torture during the Bahraini uprising (2011–present) has been described in many human rights reports as being widespread and systematic. 64% of these detainees, 1866 individuals, reported being tortured. At least five detainees died as a result. During the uprising, detainees were interrogated by three government agencies, the Ministry of Interior (MoI), the National Security Agency (NSA), and the Bahrain Defence Force. According to the Bahrain Independent Commission of Inquiry (BICI) report, physical and psychological abuses were inflicted by the NSA and the MoI on a systematic basis and in many cases amounted to torture. The BICI report describes the systematic use of techniques similar to those used during the repression of the 1990s uprising as indicative of "a systemic problem, which can only be addressed on a systemic level".

Specific mistreatment techniques were prevalent in certain prisons. Forcing detainees to urinate on themselves as a result of deprivation of toilets was most common in Al Adliya (CID) and Asri prisons. Sleep deprivation was also most common in the latter. In Al Qurain prison, where political leaders were held in excessive solitary confinement, it was reported that conditions improved and mistreatment stopped after 10 June 2011, unlike in other prisons.

==== Government denials ====
The Bahrain authorities initially denied all allegations of torture. An official from the Ministry for Social Development told Human Rights First that no one was being tortured in Bahrain, maintaining that "Everyone who's been arrested has been shown an arrest warrant and proper documentation and that no one had been taken by masked men from their home".

Subsequently, they claimed to be investigating what were alleged to be "isolated cases". Abdulaziz bin Mubarak, the Bahrain Information Authority's Director of Media Relations, told ABC News that reported incidents were taken very seriously and investigated, and that any torture that took place was unsanctioned, noting that five prison guards had been arrested for one death. Nevertheless, all five of those accused of torture were subsequently released.

== Escapes ==
On 14 March 2011, a group of prisoners estimated to number 109 managed to escape from Dry Dock prison. Some of them tried to escape by sea, some by a small bus and others hid in nearby buildings. However, most of them were captured the same day.

On 8 May 2012, the ministry of interior claimed that a prisoner arrested for protest-related activities named Ridha Al-Ghisra (25 years old) escaped from the Dry Dock prison. His family and another family who were visiting a prisoner were interrogated by the police for several hours.

== List of prisons ==
All prisons, but 2 are run by MoI.

1. Al Adliya Prison (Directorate of Criminal Investigations and Forensic Evidence - CID).
2. Al Hidd Prison.
3. Al Noaim police station.
4. Al Qudaibiya police station.
5. Al Qurain Prison (run by BDF).
6. Al Riffa police station.
7. Al Wusta police station.
8. Asri prison.
9. Budaiya police station.
10. Dry Dock Detention Center.
11. Hamad Town police station (Roundabout 17).
12. Hoora police station.
13. Isa Town Female Detention Center.
14. Juw Prison.
15. Nabih Saleh police station.
16. NSA building (basement) in Al-Qalaa (known as "the castle" or "the fort").
17. Samaheej police station.
18. Sitra police station.
19. Umm Al Hassam police station.
20. Al Ghuraifa police station

== See also ==
- Eker bombing (2012)
- Human rights in Bahrain
