= Aftermath of the Bahraini uprising (January–August 2012) =

The following is an incomplete timeline of events that followed the Bahraini uprising of 2011 from January to August 2012. This phase saw the first anniversary protest of the Bahraini uprising, the largest demonstrations in the history, and the escalation of violent clashes between youths and security forces.

== Timeline ==
=== January 2012 ===
==== 1 January ====
External image
- The first batch of Community Policemen march in their distinctive blue uniforms at their graduation ceremony on 21 September 2005.

At the Sitra funeral of a 15-year-old boy named Sayed Hashim Saeed allegedly killed by security forces the day before, thousands marched to decry the royal government of King Hamad bin Isa Al Khalifa. They were met by riot police, who fired tear gas, rubber bullets, and stun grenades at the demonstrators, some of whom hurled Molotov cocktails back at police. Meanwhile, Bahrain's new chief of police said that the Community Police force, established in 2005, would recruit 500 new officers "from all sections of Bahrain society." Bahrain's Community Police officers only patrol the areas they are recruited from, and do not carry weapons, although they have arrest powers. The government touts the new recruitment drive as progress towards addressing a recommendation by the Bahrain Independent Commission of Inquiry to urgently establish and vigorously implement "a programme for the integration into the security forces of personnel from all the communities in Bahrain."

==== 6 January ====
External media

Images
- Hospital photo of Nabeel Rajab released by the Ministry of Interior on 8 February

Video
- Police disperse the gathering after a discussion between Nabeel Rajab and a police officer on YouTube
- Ministry of Interior video released on 6 January showing Nabeel Rajab after the alleged beating on YouTube
- Ministry of Interior video released on 8 February showing Nabeel Rajab after alleged beating, and an officer pepper spraying Zainab Alkhawaja on YouTube

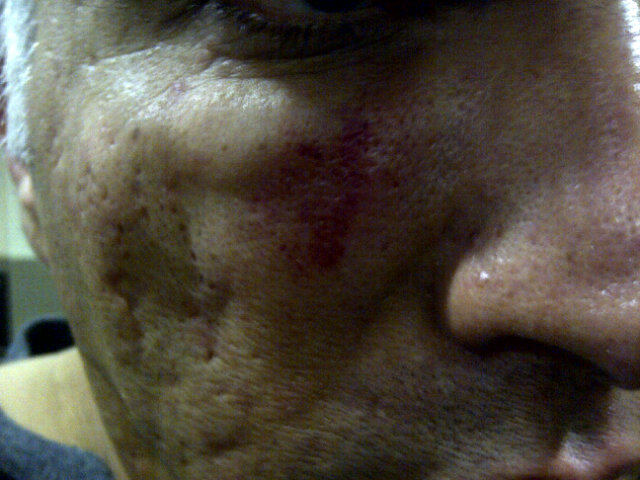
Bruising on Nabeel Rajab's face after the alleged police beating

On 6 January, while leading a peaceful nighttime protest in the Fareeq el-Makharqa district of Manama, prominent human rights defender Nabeel Rajab was hospitalized and briefly detained after allegedly being beaten by riot police. Hundreds of people participated in the protest, calling for the release of political detainees and the downfall of the King. Another participant, Zainab Alkhawaja, was pepper-sprayed by police, and a member of the Bahrain Centre for Human Rights was injured by a stun grenade in his leg.

In an interview with Al Jazeera English, Rajab said he and other protesters entered nearby houses to escape police who ran towards the crowd. Rajab said that around half an hour later, he left the house and was attacked by Jordanian, Syrian, and Pakistani policemen as he walked toward his car. He claims that they continued beating him even after he identified himself: "They said, 'Are you Nabeel Rajab?' I said 'Yes', then they beat me more." Rajab said that a Bahraini officer approached and stopped the beating. The officer then escorted Rajab to an ambulance. According to a report by the Bahrain Centre for Human Rights, activists were prohibited from visiting Rajab in the hospital, and police pushed Rajab's son and took his phone when he tried to take a picture of Rajab. Security forces also allegedly fired tear gas to disperse a gathering in solidarity with Rajab outside of Rajab's home.

Rajab's lawyer said that Rajab suffered "serious facial injuries" after being "brutally" beaten by police all over his body, especially his back and face. The Bahrain Centre for Human Rights said that Rajab had difficulty walking and was in a wheelchair. Meanwhile, the Ministry of Interior's official Twitter account reported that police found Rajab "lying on the ground." Some Twitter users began using the hashtag #mostal8y, a transliteration of the Arabic word for "lying down," to poke fun at the Ministry's explanation. Later, the Ministry published a video with no audio showing Rajab after the alleged beating.

The Ministry released the results of a full investigation into the incident on 8 February 2012. The investigation concluded that Rajab's injuries comprised two superficial bruises: one on his right cheek and one on his left thigh. The investigation found no evidence to suggest how these injuries were sustained, but concluded that the injuries were inconsistent with "a severe beating by a group of officers for three or four minutes." The investigation recommended disciplinary action for an officer who voluntarily came forward and admitted to pepper-spraying Zainab Alkhawaja with insufficient justification. Along with the results of the investigation, the Ministry released hospital images of Rajab, and a longer video of the protest, with audio. The video shows Nabeel Rajab after the alleged beating, and also shows an officer pepper-spraying Zainab Alkhawaja.

Opposition political parties including Al Wefaq and the National Democratic Action Society, as well as human rights organizations, condemned the alleged attack. US officials also expressed their concern, and urged the government to conduct an investigation.

==== 8 January ====
Richard Sollom, deputy director of Physicians for Human Rights, was denied entrance into Bahrain. Sollom held a valid passport and visa and was traveling to Bahrain to witness the appellate trial of the 20 Bahraini medics who were sentenced for treating protesters.

==== 12 January ====
Bahraini authorities stated that they would rebuild 12 Shiite mosques they had demolished in April 2011. The work seeks to address allegations of abuses raised by an independent report on the uprising by the country's Shiite minority for greater rights. As part of the widespread crackdowns, Bahraini authorities razed Shiite mosques they claimed were built illegally or had other violations.

==== 15 January ====
On 15 January King Hamad made a televised speech stating that he would issue decrees to introduce constitutional changes, such as granting parliament the right to question ministers and approve the appointed cabinet. He said that, “our loyal people have demonstrated that their will, despite all events, is devoted to continuing the reform project... Today we will continue this march with anyone who has genuine patriotic desire for further progress.”

“This won’t impact the situation, rather it could make things worse, reaffirming the idea that genuine reform is impossible for this regime,” said Matar Matar, a member of al-Wefaq, the main opposition group. Opposition groups say announcements of apparently conciliatory gestures coincide with harsh treatment of protesters, who continue to confront security forces in clashes largely confined to Shia villages. “The contradiction between promises and attacks on the ground in Bahrain is too much, and the international community is silent about this,” said Mr Matar.

==== 21 January ====
On 21 January Bahraini police fired tear gas to break up a march by thousands of Shi'ites mourning a man whom activists said was killed in custody but officials said had drowned. Dozens of pro-government Sunni militants attacked the mourners, as riot police tried to break up the clashes and keep the two sides apart in Muharraq, a town north of the capital Manama.

Amateur video was posted to YouTube that appeared to show individuals throwing Molotov cocktails at policemen in Ekir. Security forces retreated while firing tear gas at the attackers.

==== 22 January ====
A girl's elementary school in the west of Bahrain was targeted by arsonists, causing a fire in the electricity room. This was the 25th attack on an educational facility in the past four months. The perpetrators of the crime are unknown.

==== 24 January ====
The US Embassy in Bahrain announced that it was relocating some of its personnel due to a “recent increase in violent demonstrations along the Budaiya Highway corridor has led to traffic disruptions, effectively restricting travel for those living in the area”, according to the State Department. The State Department found no signs that Americans are being "targeted directly" but cited "isolated examples of anti-US sentiment" taking place on the streets while "US flags have occasionally been burned" during protests.

Judges at the High Criminal Appeals Court acquitted 11 men previously jailed in connection with the Bahraini uprising due to a lack of evidence. A twelfth man, who holds a Canadian passport, was not among those cleared since he failed to appear in court for the verdict. It is understood he was previously released from custody due to health problems and was being treated in hospital.

==== 25 January ====
In a statement, February 14 Youth Coalition condemned "international community silence and double-standard approach over the countless crimes and violations which have been committed by the regime in Bahrain and the invading Saudi Arabia forces under disguise of GCC Peninsula Shield." They said. "This silence has been interpreted by the regime in Bahrain as an approval to use brutal methods to crush the peaceful revolution and crackdown on political activists. Our people have had enough and it is time for us to assert to our right for self-defense and give up on a community that has proven it acts only when its selfish interests are threatened. Therefore, we hold the international community fully responsible for any dangerous escalation that might happen in the future".

Opposition activist claimed that 3 people died this day. Saeed Ali Hassan Al-Sikry (65 years) allegedly died as a result of inhaling tear gas fired by security forces the last night. Abbas Jaffaar al-Sheikh (25 years) allegedly died in hospital after being hospitalized for 2 months due to sustaining birdshot and rubber pullets injuries as well as inhaling tear gas. And Muntather Saeed Fakhar (37) who was allegedly arrested after a car accident with police and tortured in Hoora police station. General Directorate of Traffic said that Muntather died in hospital after sustaining injuries as a result of car accident with security forces. They claimed he had high percentage of alcohol and anesthetic drugs in his blood, blaming him for the accident.

Security forces attacked with tear gas and stun grenades a protest in Manama organised by opposition parties. Authorities blocked most routes to Manama which led to many traffic jams.

==== 26 January ====
Opposition groups claimed that Mohammed Ebrahim Ya'agob (17 years) died in the early hours of 26 January as a result of torture in police custody after they drove over and arrested him the earlier day in Sitra A brief statement by the Interior Ministry says public prosecutors are investigating the death. It gave no further details on the death, but said the detainee was hospitalized and accused of “vandalism” during widespread demonstrations on Wednesday. Later, the ministry announced that Mohammed which the statement called a "rioter" died of natural causes at Salmaniya Medical Complex. "As soon as Yagoub was arrested he stated that he suffered from Sickle Cell Anemia. Police immediately called an ambulance which took him to a hospital. He was provided with all necessary and appropriate medical care but he passed away as a result of his disease."

The New York Times reported Western intelligence officials expressing concern that Ahmed Chalabi, the Iraqi Shiite politician, was working with the leading opposition group in Bahrain, Al Wefaq National Islamic Society. A French intelligence official said, “When we hear that some members of the opposition are in touch with Hezbollah or with shady figures like the Iraqi Ahmed Chalabi, of whom we think he is acting on behalf of Iran, then this worries us”. The connection between Chalabi and Al Wefaq was acknowledged by Jawad Fairooz, secretary general of Wefaq and a former member of Parliament in Bahrain. Fairooz said, “Mr Chalabi has helped us with contacts in Washington like other people have done and we thank them”.

==== 29 January ====
Bahrain's Cabinet said on 29 January that it plans to draft a law that would impose a sentence of as long as 15 years in jail on protesters who assault policemen. Minister of Cabinet Affairs Kamal Mohammed said the government expressed “deep concern” over the increasing violence during unauthorized protests lately, according to state-run news agency BNA.

"Targeting security men obliges me to seek greater legal protection for the public security personnel. Right now, there aren't sufficient legal deterring texts," Sheikh Rashed said. "I believe that the crime of attacking security personnel is a felony punishable by up to 15 years in jail, and that should include perpetrators and inciters," he added.

==== 30 January ====
Anti-government protesters clashed with Bahraini riot police after the funeral of a 17-year-old who had died the previous week in police custody. Many residents of Sitra were doused in tear gas as police faced off against youths who blocked roads, set tyres alight and threw petrol bombs. Several thousand mourners chanted "The signs say that the tyrant's day is approaching" at the funeral.

=== March 2012 ===
==== 9 March ====
External videos
- Hundreds of thousands march in Bahrain, Budaiaya Highway, Bahrain, 9 March 2012 on YouTube

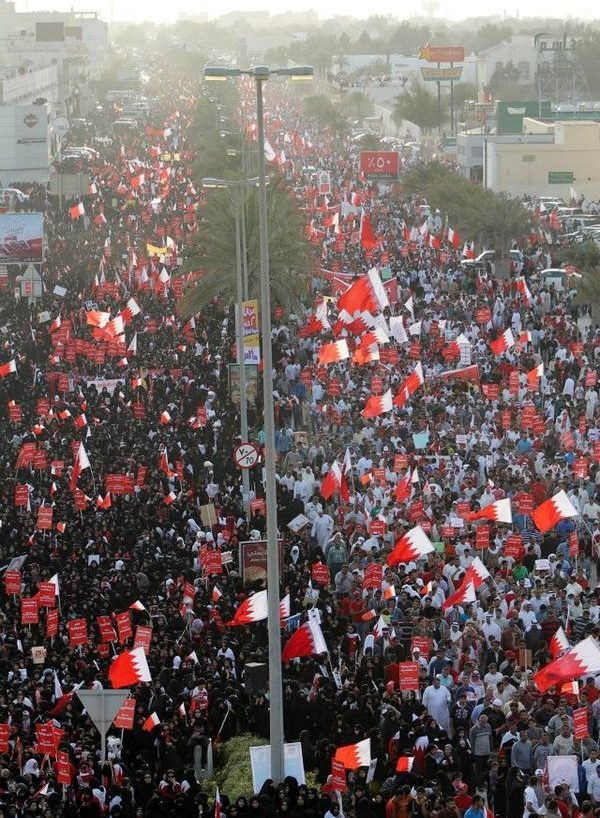
Hundreds of thousands participated in the march

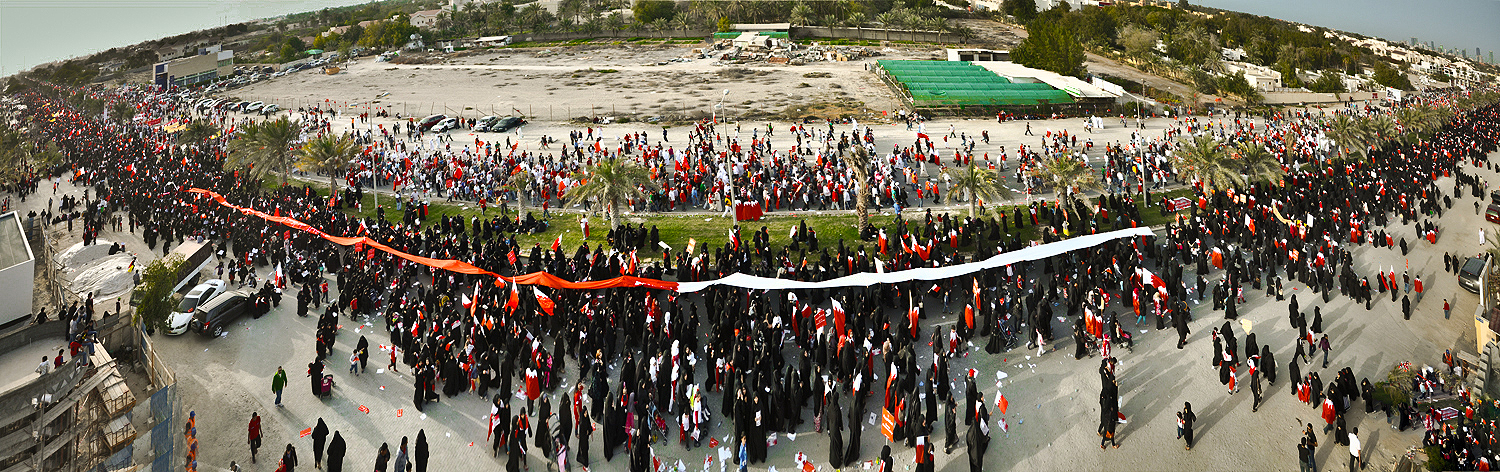
Panoramic image for the march of 9 March

Hundreds of thousands protested in one of the biggest anti-government rallies to date. According to CNN, the march "filled a four-lane highway between Duraz and Muksha". The government said 100,000 participated in the march while opposition activists estimated the number to be more than 200,000. The march was called for by Sheikh Isa Qassim, Bahrain's top Shia cleric. Protesters called for downfall of King and the release of imprisoned political leaders. The protest ended peacefully, however hundreds of youth tried to march back to the site of the now demolished symbolic Pearl roundabout, and were dispersed by security forces with tear gas. Nabeel Rajab, president of BCHR called the march "the biggest in our history".

Information Affairs Authority said the march was "a prime example of how freedom of expression is guaranteed", while Isa Qassim said earlier during Friday sermons "This rally reflects the people's consensus on the political demands and their determination to not leave the streets until their demands are met".

In Iraq, followers of Shia cleric Muqtada al-Sadr demonstrated in Basra in support of the Bahraini opposition. Around 3,000 people chanted anti-Saudi slogans and waved Bahraini and Iraqi flags.

=== April 2012 ===
==== April 10 ====
On April 10, a homemade bomb in the Bahrani village of Al Eker exploded. Blaming protesters for it, Ministry of Interior said the explosion resulted in injuring 7 policemen. The attacked was condemned by Al-Wefaq, Bahrain's main opposition party, a number of local MP's, the UN Secretary General and Gulf Cooperation Council General-Secretary.

Pro-government newspaper Akhbar Al Khaleej reported that a bus was burned by a "radical" group called "Asa'ib Althawra" using Molotov cocktails in Sehla.

The attack on the bus had apparently been done by a group calling itself Asa'ib Althawra. The claim of responsibility for the attack was made on the group's Twitter account "Rebelsracebh".

During the day, pro-government groups organized illegal gatherings near Alba Roundabout in the predominantly-Sunni town of Riffa. They also damaged two cars and attacked a 24-hour supermarket belonging to the Jawad company, whose owner is Shi'a.

Another group tried to enter the opposition stronghold of Nuwaidrat but were prevented by police.

==== April 12 ====
On April 12, a gas cylinder exploded in the Al Ma'aridh road in Manama, damaging three cars.

==== April 18 ====
Four mechanics from the Force India Formula One team were in a van that was the target of a Molotov cocktail on Wednesday night.

==== April 19 ====
On Thursday night, a bus with 12 members of the Sauber Formula One team drove to the side of the road after seeing a burning bottle (Molotov cocktail) and then sped off when members of the team saw masked men running up to the bus.

Two India Force employees returned to Europe to avoid any possibility of being involved in an "isolated incident" after Wednesday's attack.

==== April 20 ====
Tens of thousands of anti-government protesters flooded Budaiya highway during the first day of practices for the Formula 1 race.

In Iraq, hard-line Shiite cleric Muqtada al-Sadr, denounced Bahrain for staging the Grand Prix while "blood is being shed" on the island. Al-Sadr also condemned the F1 teams for racing, saying their presence in Bahrain gives "support for injustices and the killings."

As a majority Shiite country, Iraq has backed Bahrain's Shiite-led protests.

==== April 24 ====
Ministry of Interior said that four policemen were injured in Duraz in a "terrorist bombing", two of whom were at serious conditions. According to the ministry, they had received a call about a fire in a building, and while proving cover for firefighters policemen the "terrorist bombing" occurred.

Jawad Fayrooz, a leader in Al-Wefaq, the country's largest opposition group, downplayed the credibility of the government account and said "mystery surrounds what is announced by the regime every now and then about the occurrence of explosions". He also emphasized on the "peaceful nature" of protests.

=== May 2012 ===
==== May 5 ====
Ministry of Interior said a bomb had exploded in the village of Bani Jamra at 12:25 am, allegedly injuring four policemen, including an officer with serious injuries.

==== May 8 ====
Ministry of interior claimed that a prisoner arrested for protest-related activities named Ridha Al-Ghisra (25 years old) escaped from the Dry Dock prison. His family and another family who were visiting a prisoner were interrogated by police for several hours.

==== May 18 ====
Tens of thousands took part in a protest that stretched for over five kilometers (three miles) along Budaiya highway against union plans with Saudi Arabia. Protesters chanted slogans such as "Bahrain is not for sale", "No unity, no unity" and held signs demanding self-determination. They also expressed their solidarity with Isa Qassim, Bahrain's Shia top religious leader who was recently attacked by regime loyalists in newspapers. Al Wefaq estimated the number of participants at 300,000 - more than 50% of Bahraini citizens.

==== May 19 ====
Around 5,000 of pro-government Sunnis participated in a sit-in Al Fateh Grand Mosque yard in Juffair district of Manama supporting union plans that "do not prevent democratic progress" with Saudi Arabia and other Gulf states. The Prime Minister praised the gathering calling it the "true national voice". Justice Minister also praised their "honorable positions" against "foreign ambitions" in reference to Iran.

Al Wefaq said they postponed their sit in front of UN building in Manama after Ministry of Interior refused to give them authorization "due to conflicting with another event in a nearby area".

==== May 20 ====
At night, five opposition parties organised a sit-in Muqsha' attended by large crowds calling for more reforms. Speakers cited BICI findings of human rights allegations committed by the government in 2011 such as arbitrary arrests, use of excessive and unnecessary force, torture and destruction of mosques, noting that these violations are still occurring. They demanded to hold those accountable and said they are open for dialogue. Also, there were a few speeches for families of detained persons who spoke about abuses in arrests and inside prisons.

==== May 21 ====
For the second night, opposition parties organised a sit-in Muqsha' in conjunction with Bahrain's Universal Periodic Review renewing their calls for a dialogue based on Manama Paper and Crown Prince's initiative which he proposed in March 2011. Leading activist of the National Democratic Action Society, Aisha bocherry accused the government of not complying with its obligations, asking "How can the government integrate all components of people and allow all people of Bahrain join the Military and [Ministry of] Interior while it refuses to return a school director to her [previous] position [after being expelled from]?". The rest of speeches were for victims of human rights violations and their families in which they described the circumstances of torture in prisons.

In other places, tens of Ma'ameer residents took part in a protest demanding the release of political prisoners. In Samaheej, tens of residents participated in a sit-in near the village's Ma'tam calling for the release of political prisoners. In a speech, a prisoner's mother said "[T]hey [Prisoners] are being arbitrary arrested without warrants due to their [political] activities and that most of them weren't brought before courts despite exceeding the suspension period limit".

==== May 24 ====
The hearing of thirteen prominent activist retrial resumed. Abdulhadi al-Khawaja who entered the courtroom in a wheelchair and according to Bahrain Youth Society for Human Rights he mentioned getting tortured and beaten in his testimony.

==== May 28 ====
Human rights activist Abdulhadi al-Khawaja ended his 110-day hunger strike "after succeeding in shedding light on the case of the detainees in Bahraini prisons", a statement by Bahrain Youth Society for Human Rights quoted him saying. Another human rights activist, Nabeel Rajab, who is accused of "organising illegal protests and insulting authorities" was released on bail.

=== June 2012 ===
==== June 7 ====
According to Al-Watan pro-government newspaper, a man named Ahmad Salim al-Dhufairi (18) died in Jordan after receiving medical treatment for injuries when a "strange object" set up by "terrorists" exploded near his home in Hamad Town on 18 April while he was trying to remove burning tires set by protesters in the street. Ministry of Interior did not issue any statement about the incident and Al Wasat failed to get details from the Ministry.

==== June 8 ====
Opposition parties staged one of the largest marches in weeks, gathering tens of thousands of protesters in Budaiya highway, west of Manama. Riot police intervened firing tear gas and stun grenades at protesters, breaking up the rally. Other clashes occurred in Abu Saiba and Jidhafs where at least one protester was injured with birdshot, according to human rights activist Yousif al-Muhafdah. Witness said "there were demonstrations in nearly a dozen locations". A Bahraini photojournalist called Mazen Mahdi said police stopped reporters while they were covering the protest.

==== June 9 ====
Al Wefaq media activist Ali Abdulla Habib was arrested due to "chanting slogans against the law" in a protest during the previous day. Abdulhussain al-Mitgawi, a former MP of Al Wefaq said Ministry of Interior was "confused", because "Habib did not chant any slogans against the law; all what he did is reading the closing statement". Habib was not presented to Public Prosecution, because Saturday is a holiday in Bahrain.

Al Wefaq said security forces had injured a number of protesters with bird-shot during crackdown on protests at night. The statement named six different locations where bird-shot was allegedly used.

A sit in was held in National Democratic Assemblage headquarters in solidarity with a detained reporter called Ahmed Radhi. Speakers in the sit in said that "protecting journalists has become a national and international responsibility" due to "the ongoing violations against journalists in Bahrain". Among participants were Yousif al-Mahafdha of Bahrain Centre for Human Rights and Haytham Radhi, brother of the detainee.

==== June 10 ====
Al Wefaq accused security forces of "assaulting" the house of its president Ali Salman in Bilad Al Qadeem, destroying and stealing the security cameras around the house at dawn. They also posted a video on YouTube showing the alleged incident. The opposition society also said security forces raided houses in the area to arrest a number of citizens. Six youth were arrested.

Al Wefaq media activist Ali Abdulla Habib, arrested on 9 June was released after presenting to the Public Prosecution.

On its Twitter account, Ministry of Interior said that a security patrol in Hamad Town was completely burned when a group of "vandals" attacked it using Molotov Cocktails. However, the statement said there were no injuries. In Another Tweet, the Ministry claimed that one of its personnel was injured in Diraz by an iron rod fired using "homemade launcher" during clashes with a group of "vandals".

Ministry of Interior announced it had arrested seven individuals accused of "attacking police patrol with Molotov cocktails" on 7 June. According to the Ministry, the alleged attack occurred in Bilad Al Qadeem, resulted in burn injuries for two policemen and "completely gutted" their vehicle.

In Riffa, hundreds of citizens participated in the funeral of al-Dhufairi who had died three days earlier in Jordan.

==== June 13 ====
In Al Dair, 5-year old Ahmed al-Naham was injured with birdshot in his left eye during clashes between security forces and protesters. According to his family, he was along with his father who was then selling fish on the road when the incident occurred. Al-Naham was taken to Salmaniya hospital ICU for treatment. His father was also injured with birdshot. Ministry of Interior said a number of "outlaws" blocked the area's entrance and attacked security forces, who then responded with necessary "legal actions". The Ministry added that it had launched an investigation into the incident and that al-Naham will be moved to Saudi Arabia for further treatment.

In Bilad Al Qadeem, Al Wefaq held a sit in solidarity with detained human rights activist Nabeel Rajab and called for his immediate release. Speakers included Sayed Jameel Kadhim, chairman of Al Wefaq Shura council, Mohammed al-Tajer, a human rights lawyer and Yousif al-Muhafadha, member of the board of directors at Bahrain Centre for Human Rights.

==== June 14 ====
Sayed Hadi al-Mosawi, former MP of Al Wefaq was released on bail after an hour and half of investigation in Public Prosecution after Ministry of Interior accused him of "insulting" it in a press conference on 29 May. A statement released by Al Wefaq said that al-Mosawi had recently participated in Bahrain's Universal Periodic Review.

==== June 15 ====
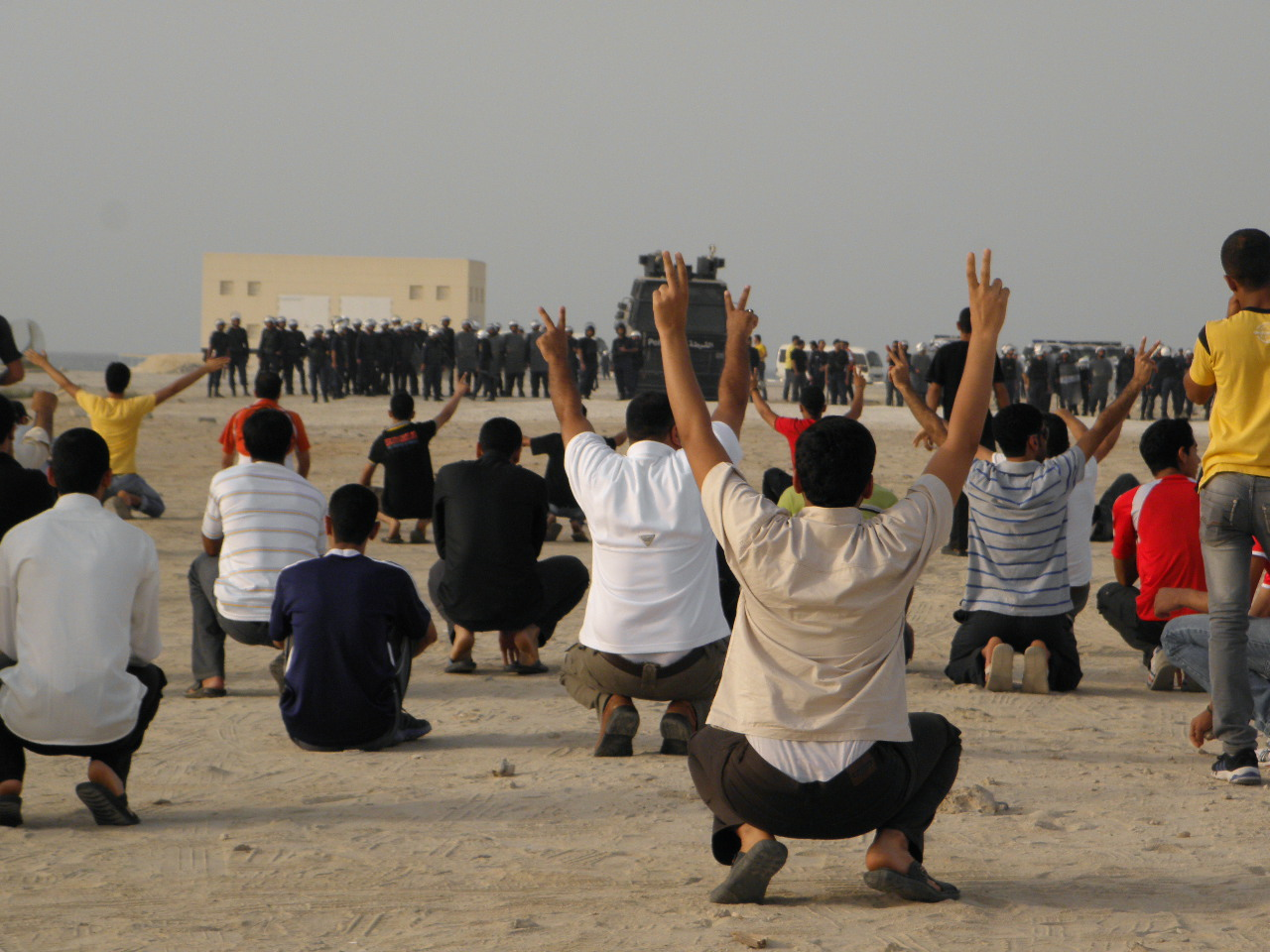
Protesters facing riot police in Karbabad beach.

Security forces fired tear gas and arrested a number of protesters who organised a sit in Karbabad beach. The sit in was called for by Al Wefaq opposition party, however only two hours before its start time, Ministry of Interior announced the sit in was "illegal". Security personnel removed equipment from the location and placed a checkpoint. In its Twitter account, Ministry of Interior said security officers had disperses a group which attempted to organised an "illegal gathering" after warning them.

One of the arrested was Zahra al-Sheikh, a 21-year-old female student. She was reportedly beaten and arrested after security forces spotted her filming crackdown from her car's window. Al-Sheikh sister reported that she was "filmed naked" after being "forced to take off her clothes" by a policewoman. She also added that her sister was abused by a male officer while in detention. Al Wefaq issued a statement citing al-Sheikh family members accusations that she was abused while in detention. The statement also said the Public Prosecution has decided to detain al-Sheikh for a week on after charging her with "assaulting" a police officer.

==== June 22 ====
Riot police fire at protest involving political leaders.

A small protest involving Ali Salman, Secretary General of the Al Wefaq political party, and Hassan al-Marzooq, another opposition leader, was fired on by riot police. Salman claimed that he and Almarzooq were deliberately targeted by police.

=== July 2012 ===
==== July 14 ====
Widespread anti-government protests were held. Protesters who clashed with security forces threw Molotov cocktails, the latter made a number of arrest raids. These protests come shortly after the government decided to ban all opposition marches. The Associated Press said this decision will "likely escalate confrontations".

In Karzakan, security forces attacked a protest using tear gas and birdshot, witnesses said. Following the protest, clashes between police and protesters took place. According to witnesses, twelve protesters were arrested after security forces surrounded and then broke into a house they were hiding inside. The total number of arrests is not known yet.

==== July 20 ====
Several security checkpoints were set up in anticipation of twenty five demonstrations called for by opposition parties. Security forces clashed with thousands of protesters who tried to stage demonstrations. Riot police used tear gas and birdshot injuring and arresting several protesters who hurled back Molotov cocktails. Some marches ended peacefully without clashes, while most of them were dispersed by security forces. Authorities accused protest organizers of intentionally disrupting everyday life of people. Opposition parties said the decision to ban rallies was unconstitutional and against freedom of expression. They issued a joint statement accusing authorities of inflicting tens of injuries and attacking over 72 areas. At night, several candle marches were staged in memorial of uprising victims.

=== August 2012 ===
==== 2 August ====
Activists said at least 45 people were injured in the security forces' operation to break up the three separate protests across the Gulf Arab island late on Thursday. The head of the Bahrain Youth Society for Human Rights, Mohammed al-Maskati, said activist Zainab al-Khawaja was arrested early on Friday when she tried to hold a solitary protest sit-in at al-Badei street close to the capital Manama. He further adding that police had used tear gas to disperse the protesters. There were no reports of serious injuries. Interior Ministry said in a statement on its website that "riot instigators" threw Molotov cocktails at a ministry vehicle in a road near Bani Jamra, but that its driver and his companion escaped uninjured.

==== 8 August ====
A Bahraini court cut jail sentences against 11 people convicted of attacking a soldier and acquitted four others. The appeals court reduced the main charge against 15 defendants from attempted murder to "physical attack" on the soldier, while charges of taking part in illegal assemblies and rioting during a month of Shia-led protests last year remained unchanged. Five of the defendants had their sentences reduced to two years. The sentences against two other defendants were dropped to one year and six months respectively, the lawyer said requesting anonymity. However, the 16th defendant lost his right to appeal for remaining at large.

==== 9 August ====
Russia's representative to the UN suggested that Bahrain's crisis be added to the international organization's list of things to do.

==== 14 August ====
Bahrain on Tuesday delayed until 4 September a ruling in the retrial of 20 men convicted of leading an uprising last year, lawyers said, a case under scrutiny from U.S. officials keen for acquittals to help restore calm in the Gulf kingdom. The 20 men, including seven being tried in absentia, are believed to be among hundreds who an international rights commission assessed in November 2011 had been tortured during a period of martial law imposed to help quell the uprising. The presiding judge gave no reason for the postponement. According to Jishi and other lawyers present in the courtroom after the postponement was announced, angry defendants chanted, "We sacrifice our soul and blood for you, Bahrain", visibly angering the judge.

==== 16 August ====
Prominent Bahraini human rights activist Nabeel Rajab has been jailed for three years for taking part in "illegal gatherings". Rajab's lawyer Mohammed al-Jishi said three year-long sentences had been handed down on three separate counts. His appeal in that case has been deferred to 23 August. Fellow activists immediately condemned the decision, with some members of the protest movement calling for demonstrations on Thursday evening. Rajab's sentence in July 2012 came after prosecutors received complaints that he had libelled residents of the town of Muharraq on Twitter.

==== 18 August ====
Police in Bahrain have claimed self-defence after a youth of 16 was killed during a riot but the opposition say he was kicked on the ground. The Gulf state's interior ministry said the youth had been among a crowd throwing petrol bombs at police on Friday night, in the Muharraq area. But the Shia Muslim opposition party Al Wefaq said the boy had been the victim of a "barbaric" attack. Friday also saw tension in Bahrain as Shia Muslims marked Jerusalem Day in support of Palestinians.

==== 20 August ====
Bahrain's public prosecutor's office says that shotgun pellets have caused the death of a 16-year-old youth last week. It said a probe is in progress.

==== 21 August ====
Violence broke out the funeral of 16-year-old Hussam al-Haddad, who was killed on Friday by police gunfire. Protesters pelted police with petrol bombs and stones in clashes that broke out in Bahrain on Tuesday night at the funeral for a teenage demonstrator killed last week in a new bout of unrest in the kingdom. The government said a group of rioters bombarded police with Molotov cocktails and stones from the roof of a religious centre, and police have arrested eight protesters. However, the main opposition Al Wefaq party said riot police started the violence by firing tear gas at those mourning Haddad.

==== 23 August ====
A Bahrain appeals court acquitted activist Nabeel Rajab, who had been handed a three-month jail sentence on 9 July 2012 for alleged insults made on Twitter to members of the Sunni community. He has however, still will serve a three-year term for "unauthorised" protests against Bahrain's Sunni monarchy.

==== 26 August ====
Maryam al-Khawaja, the Denmark-based international spokesperson for the Bahrain Centre for Human Rights, was refused entry into Egypt at Cairo airport after landing Sunday, accusing the Arab governments of continuing repressive security cooperation despite political change in the region. Maryam said she had hoped to enter Egypt for a few hours to see friends on a stopover while flying to South Africa. The officials at Cairo airport first stamped her passport but then cancelled her visa after realizing she was a Bahraini activist. She wrote on Twitter that Egyptian police had threatened to deport her to Bahrain, where she would likely be arrested if she refused to leave Cairo.

==== 30 August ====
A Bahrain policeman has been charged over shooting dead a 16-year old Shia, Husam al-Haddad, when a group of protesters attacked security forces with petrol bombs. According to Bahrain News Agency official Nawaf Hamza, the public prosecution "accused the policeman who opened fire on one of the attackers of premeditated murder." He said the accused was released but has been banned from travel. His name and nationality have not been revealed. But the public prosecution issued a later statement saying the charge against the policeman was "preliminary", pending an investigation which so far shows the killing was "likely a case of self defence."

==== 31 August ====
Thousands of protesters from Shia opposition groups marched in Bahrain on Friday to demand the release of jailed activists. Protesters, including women, waved Bahraini flags and pictures of jailed activists from Shia opposition groups. They carried portraits of Nabeel Rajab, a human rights activist sentenced to three years in prison for participating in illegal demonstrations, and placards reading "Free Nabeel Rajab!", while chanting, "We do not forget the prisoners!"
