= Torture during the 2011 Bahraini uprising =

Torture during the 2011 Bahraini uprising was described in many human rights reports as being widespread and systematic; 64% of detainees (1866 individuals) reported being tortured. At least five individuals died as a result. During the uprising, detainees were interrogated by three government agencies, the Ministry of Interior (MoI), the National Security Agency (NSA) and the Bahrain Defence Force.

According to the Bahrain Independent Commission of Inquiry (BICI) report, physical and psychological abuses were inflicted by the NSA and the MoI systematically and in many cases amounted to torture. The BICI report found that the techniques used were similar to those used during the suppression of the 1990s uprising and indicative of "a systemic problem, which can only be addressed on a systemic level".

== Background ==
Government sanctioned torture was frequently used during the "State Security Law Era" between 1975 and 1999; 17 deaths was the result. After the Emir Hamad bin Isa Al Khalifa succeeded his father Isa bin Salman Al Khalifa in 1999, reports of torture declined dramatically and conditions of detention improved. However Royal Decree 56 of 2002 gave effective immunity to all those accused of torture during the 1990s uprising and before (including notorious figures such as Ian Henderson and Adel Flaifel.). Towards the end of 2007 torture began to be employed again and by 2010 had become common again.

== Techniques of abuse ==
Detainees have described a number of specific techniques used by the Bahraini authorities to obtain information, induce confessions, inflict punishment or simply for revenge. These techniques involved both psychological and physical abuse.

=== Physical abuse ===
Physical abuse was reported as starting from the time of arrest and continuing during transport and throughout the period of detention, including in hospital, where some detainees reported recent wounds being hit. Regular beatings were inflicted, sometimes over a period of months, on the back, the head and the soles of feet in particular.

Detainees were blindfolded to prevent them from identifying their assailants. Almost all detainees had marks on their noses and wrists caused by tight blindfolding and handcuffing. Sometimes handcuffs were applied so tightly as to cause a loss of sensation in the hands. Sleep deprivation techniques included the use of cold water, physical beatings and loud noises. Most detainees reported being forced to remain standing for long periods, often on one leg, and sometimes being suspended by ropes in painful positions. The effect of extremely cold temperatures was enhanced by wetting clothes and bedding. Cigarette burns and electric shocks were inflicted on at least 100 detainees. A number of detainees were sexually assaulted by touching and violent handling of their genitals or finger thrusts and the insertion of objects including hosepipes and ends of rifle barrels into the anus.

During a brutal crackdown against the protesting prisoners in Jau prison in April 2021, detainees were brutally dragged out of their cells and severely beaten. Prison authorities competed with each other to see who could beat the prisoners more brutally. The authorities used metal rods to beat the detainees on their legs, knees, chest and private parts. Bahrain Institute for Rights and Democracy reported that 64 prisoners were forcibly disappeared for 19 days following this incident and were held incommunicado for over a month.

=== Psychological abuse ===
Almost all detainees underwent psychological torture of various forms. According to the BICI report a "climate of fear" was created in detainees who heard fellow-detainees being tortured. All detainees were subjected to verbal abuse, particularly involving derogatory remarks about the detainees' religion or relatives. A number of detainees were threatened with rape, either personally or involving family members. Some were held in solitary confinement for prolonged periods. Forms of intimidating and degrading treatment used included mock executions, detainees being stripped before beatings and detainees being forced to clean lavatories with their bare hands or, in one reported case, being forced to eat their own feces.

== Deaths ==
The BICI report attributed five deaths of detainees to torture. Bahrain Centre for Human Rights have blamed the death of another 12 individuals on "torture and beating". One of the five deaths documented by BICI occurred in the course of torture by the NSA, the other four took place at the MoI's Dry Dock detention center.

=== Hasan Jassim Mohamed Maki ===
Hasan Jassim Mohamed Maki, a 39-year-old Bahraini from the village of Karzakan, died on 3 April 2011. The cause of death was attributed to cardiac arrest induced by sickle-cell disease. Amnesty International and Médecins Sans Frontières examined the body, and reported the presence of wounds inflicted by sharp objects, suggesting that he had been tortured while detained. His medical condition may have been neglected while he was in government custody; the commission attributed his death to torture.

=== Zakariya Rashid Hassan Al Asheri ===
Zakariya Al Asheri was a forty-year-old Bahraini blogger and journalist who worked as an editor and writer for a local blog news website in Al Dair. He died on 9 April 2011, officially as a result of massive heart failure and cardiac arrest following complications of sickle-cell disease while in Ministry of the Interior custody. His family reported that he had never previously experienced harmful effects of sickle-cell disease despite being a carrier. Although the Ministry of Interior informed the family that he had died from sickle-cell disease while asleep, a blindfolded cellmate described hearing prison guards enter their cell and beat Zakariya to death when he refused to be quiet. The commission attributed his death to torture.

=== Ali Isa Ibrahim Saqer ===
Ali Saqer was a 31-year-old Bahraini from Sehla who died on 9 April 2011 from hypovolemic shock due to multiple traumas sustained during torture in the custody of the Ministry of the Interior. His body was covered with red bruises, in particular on the back of the hands and around the right eye. The Ministry of the Interior claimed that he had died from injuries received while resisting security forces. Bahraini human rights activist Nabeel Rajab was reported to the Military Prosecutor by the Interior Ministry for posting allegedly doctored photos of Ali Saqer's corpse to his Twitter account. The photographs were confirmed as genuine by a Human Rights Watch researcher who had seen the body prior to burial.

=== Abdulkarim Ali Ahmed Fakhrawi ===
Abdulkarim "Karim" Fakhrawi, was a 49-year-old Bahraini journalist, businessman, co-founder of the newspaper Alwasat, and owner of the largest group of bookstores in Bahrain. He was also a member of Al-Wefaq, Bahrain's principal opposition party. He died on 11 April 2011 from injuries sustained during torture while in NSA custody. Despite government claims that Fakhrawi's death had occurred during a brawl with two NSA officers and was due to kidney failure, witnesses reported having heard him screaming while receiving beatings and then suddenly the screaming stopped, after which one individual said to another, "you killed him".

=== Jaber Ebrahim Yousif Mohamed Alawiyat ===
Jaber Ebrahim Yousif Mohamed Alawiyat was a 41-year-old Bahraini from the village of Khamis who died on 12 June 2011 from injuries sustained while in Ministry of the Interior custody. 20 days after his detention Alawiyat's family was allowed to visit him and reported seeing bruises on his face, head and the left hand, which he was unable to move. He was released from custody on 9 June and left outside the entrance to a hospital. He died three days later, complaining of stomach pains.

=== Yousif Ahmed Muwali ===
Yousif Ahmed Muwali went missing on 9 January 2012. When his family filed a missing persons report on 11 January 2012, they were told by a police officer that Yousif was at the General Directorate of Criminal Investigations and Forensic Evidence (CID) in Adliya. The Ministry of the Interior denied having Muwali in their custody. They claimed that he had drowned and his body had been found after being washed ashore on the Amwaj Islands on 13 January 2012. The death certificate indicated that death had occurred approximately 2 days previously.

MOI proceeded to carry out an autopsy without obtaining the consent of the family, who were not allowed to see the body until the following morning. Muwali's uncle told the family's lawyer Hanan AlAradi that there were obvious signs of torture on his nephew's head and neck, cigarette burns on his arms and bruises on various parts of the body. Despite the family's claim that Muwali had been tortured to death the Ministry of the Interior insisted that the cause of death had been drowning.

Al Wefaq called for an international independent investigation in the case, alleging a loss of all confidence in the integrity of the Bahraini judiciary and security forces. The body was only handed back to the family on 21 January 2012 – 10 days after Muwali's death. The funeral took place in Muharraq the same day.

In May, the Bahraini government was forced to deny independent autopsy evidence that Muwali had been electrocuted and otherwise tortured by the police until he lost consciousness; Muwali was then dumped in water while still unconscious, and he drowned.

== Government denials ==
The Ministry for Social Development denied to Human Rights First that tortured was used in Bahrain, that "Everyone who’s been arrested has been shown an arrest warrant and proper documentation", that masked men never removed detainees from their homes, and that the government investigation of the alleged incidents found they were only "isolated cases".

Abdulaziz bin Mubarak, the Bahrain Information Authority's Director of Media Relations, told ABC News that reported incidents were taken very seriously and investigated, and that torture was not sanctioned by the government and that the five prison guards involved in one death had been arrested; the guards were eventually released without further action.

== Lack of accountability ==
The BICI report described a "culture of complete impunity" by the lack of accountability within the security forces that was supported by judges and public officials of "implicitly condoning" misbehavior. One judge had accepted confessions allegedly obtained under torture as evidence against the detainees. Also, a detainee reported beatings and threats of greater severity after testifying in court about his mistreatment.
