= 2012 Bahrain Grand Prix protests =

- Part of aftermath of the Bahraini uprising of 2011
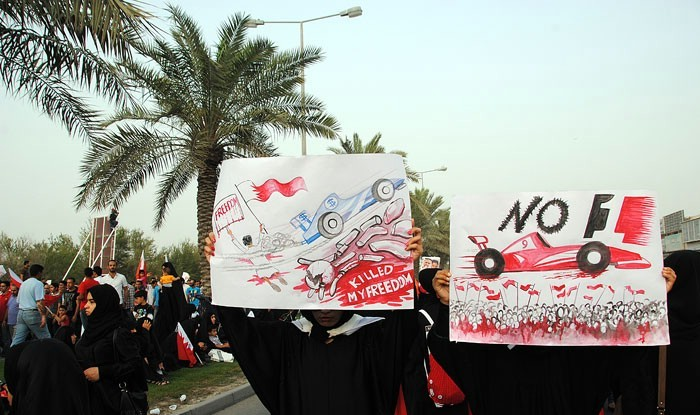
- Protesters holding anti-F1 signs during a protest on 20 April.

The 2012 Bahrain Grand Prix returned to Bahrain after the 2011 race was cancelled due to anti-government protests. The decision to hold the race despite ongoing protests and violence was described as "controversial" by Al Jazeera English, CNN, AFP and Sky News. The Independent described the case as "one of the most controversial in the history of the sport".

== Events leading up to the race ==
=== 2011 cancellation and 2012 reinstatement ===
The 2011 Bahrain Grand Prix was cancelled due to civil unrest on 21 February 2011 at the request of Crown Prince Salman bin Hamad bin Isa Al Khalifa and the Bahrain Motor Federation. One month after an attempt by the FIA World Motor Sport Council to reinstate the race with an October date failed, the FIA released a provisional calendar for the 2012 season, re-instating the Bahrain Grand Prix. The event was originally given a November date so as to allow for stability to return to the country. A second provisional calendar was released in July, with the Bahrain Grand Prix brought forward to 22 April. This was later confirmed with the release of the final season calendar in December 2011.

With pre-season testing for the 2012 season starting in February 2012, the future of the Bahrain Grand Prix became the focus of renewed speculation. Several teams expressed concern over the state of the country as early as the 2011 Japanese Grand Prix, while the Bahrain Centre for Human Rights urged the teams to boycott the race amid renewed political disturbances in the country, claiming that the Bahrain government was attempting to use the race to present the country as being stable. Bernie Ecclestone maintained his stance on the race going ahead, while 1996 World Champion Damon Hill stated his belief that Formula One could return to Bahrain "with a clear conscience" after visiting the country. However, Hill changed his stance just two weeks later, stating that the race could "create more problems than it solved". He elaborated further, cautioning against "indifference" and urging the sport not to take political sides. Fellow former World Champion Jackie Stewart expressed his support for the race taking place, warning that cancelling the Grand Prix could be even more damaging to the sport than holding it.

"The FIA, like many in the diplomatic community in the kingdom, the main political opposition [...] believes the staging of a Grand Prix would be beneficial in bridging some of the difficulties Bahrain is experiencing. The FIA is not in a position to influence political matters in a sovereign country such as Bahrain and we can only wish for a long-term peaceful solution."

— The FIA's stance on the future of the Bahrain Grand Prix as of 19 February 2012.

"What we must put above all else is what will be the penalty in terms of human cost if the race goes ahead. It would be a bad state of affairs, and bad for Formula One, to be seen to be enforcing martial law in order to hold the race. That is not what this sport should be about."

— Former World Champion Damon Hill, voicing concerns over the race going ahead as planned.

"You've got to be very careful because if you were to say the Bahrain Grand Prix should not take place, then will there be pressure on Russia, for example, for the Winter Olympics when they come round in 2014? Will there be demonstrations because Russia is still trying to create democracy? [...] You've got to be very careful. If this race is cancelled then I think it is a very backward position to have in sport. We have already got a model in Northern Ireland where football continued to be played and so did rugby and so did motorcycling."

— Former World Champion Jackie Stewart on the ramifications of cancelling the race.

=== Civilian protests against the race ===
In January 2012, human rights groups in the country urged teams to boycott the 2012 race amid ongoing conflict in the country. In February, a protest organisation calling itself the February 14 Youth Coalition wrote to Bernie Ecclestone, threatening to "do everything in [their] capacity to ensure the failure of the race" if it went ahead. They further added they could not guarantee the safety of teams, drivers, and spectators if the race went ahead. Ecclestone was unconcerned about the threat, stating he did not feel the protesters needed to resort to violence, and expressing confidence event organisers would not respond to any opposition with force. World Drivers' Champions Sebastian Vettel and Michael Schumacher also supported the race going ahead.

On 28 March 2012, Ecclestone confirmed the event would go ahead. Four days later, protesters revived their campaign against the race, with police breaking up demonstrations in Abu Saiba and Tubli. Activists also turned to Twitter in an effort to see the event cancelled. By the end of the first week of April, it was reported that the focus of the protest movement had shifted to the race, with activists accusing the government of using the race to "[try and] cheat the international community, telling them everything is back to normal". The government rejected these claims, with circuit chairman Zayed al-Zayani putting the race forward as being in the interests of all involved, and that it would bring economic benefits to the region that could not be ignored. al-Zayani further claimed that he did not understand why the race was being made into a political issue, and was instead quoted as saying "the race is taking place because Bahrain has been the home of motorsport in the Middle East", and accused "armchair observers" and "scaremongering extremists" of attempting to create a moral panic over the race. Activists denied these claims, reiterating their belief that the government was attempting to use the race to "tell the outside world that the whole thing is back to normal" and that "they want to come back from isolation and say that everything is back to normal".

Following the anti-race protests, Ecclestone admitted he had no power to force the teams into racing in Bahrain if they did not want to. The same day, The Guardian quoted an unnamed team principal as saying he was "uncomfortable" with going to Bahrain, and "the only way they [the organisers] can pull this race off without incident is to have a complete military lockdown there. And I think that would be unacceptable, both for F1 and for Bahrain. But I don't see any other way they can do it." He acknowledged that, although there had been no restrictions on travel to Bahrain issued by the Foreign and Commonwealth Office as of two weeks prior to the race, and no objections to travelling to the country by the insurance companies that insure the teams, several teams shared similar reservations about the race going ahead. With the race scheduled to take place one week after the Chinese Grand Prix, it was further claimed that teams had been issued with two return tickets — one from Shanghai direct to England, and one from Shanghai to England via Bahrain — in the event of the Bahrain Grand Prix's cancellation. Ecclestone downplayed these comments, claiming that none of the twelve teams had expressed any reservations to him about racing, and adding that any team who failed to race would be in breach of the Concorde Agreement and potentially facing a financial penalty.

=== Response of the FIA ===
During preparations for the Chinese Grand Prix, one week before the race in Bahrain, Zayed al-Zayani drew attention to a report commissioned by Lotus F1 predicting protests over the race would be limited to peaceful demonstrations, and aside from a slight increase in police presence, spectators "would not notice the difference" between the 2010 and 2012 events. The report by Lotus was substantiated by a briefing from John Yates, former Assistant Commissioner to the London Metropolitan Police Service and advisor to the Bahrain Ministry of the Interior, stating the protests were unlawful and being misrepresented in the media. Yates later admitted there was no way the Bahraini government could guarantee anybody's safety for the duration of the race meeting, and security forces might be forced to use live ammunition and lethal force in the event of an incident during the Grand Prix. Following this and warnings that the protests could result in casualties, Nabeel Rajab, president of the Bahrain Centre for Human Rights, offered reassurances that nobody within the Formula One community would be hurt in the protests, and that the protests were not a personal attack on the sport, but rather against the political implications of the race going ahead.

"I am particularly concerned that those intimately involved in F1 – drivers, teams, sponsors, media and supporters wishing to attend – are being presented with a distorted picture. This picture is being shaped by a huge amount of inaccurate and often deliberately false information being spread through social media forums. Some troubles do still exist. The almost nightly skirmishes that take place in certain villages are a potential block on progress and are putting those involved in their policing and innocent members of the public in significant danger. However, in spite of how these events may be portrayed through the medium of YouTube and other outlets, their significance should not be overplayed. These are now lawful protests, which are permitted, but violent conduct by a very small minority – often groups of 15–20 young men. These are criminal acts being perpetrated against an unarmed police force who, in the face of such attacks, are acting with remarkable restraint. These people are intent on causing harm to the police and the communities in which they live. They are not representative of the vast majority of delightful, law-abiding citizens that represent the real Bahrain that I see every day. Along with my family, I feel completely safe. Indeed, safer than I have often felt in London."

— Briefing by John Yates, former assistant commissioner to the London Metropolitan Police Service, to the FIA and Formula One teams, dated 12 April 2012.

Members of the Formula One Teams Association responded to media speculation that they would see the race cancelled, stating that they did not have the power to cancel a Grand Prix, while Bernie Ecclestone announced that the race would only be cancelled at the request of Bahraini authorities. When asked about their feelings on the Bahrain Grand Prix, McLaren and Red Bull Racing drivers Jenson Button and Mark Webber both called for unity within the sport on the subject, calling upon the FIA to make the most informed decision possible.

On 13 April, the FIA released a statement concluding it was satisfied with the state of affairs in Bahrain, and that the 2012 Bahrain Grand Prix would be going ahead as planned. Following a meeting between the teams and Ecclestone in Shanghai, the teams declared themselves to be happy with the decision to hold the race. The decision attracted objection from human rights advocates, with Amnesty International describing the situation as being "no better" than in 2011, while The Times reported teams had relieved staff members who objected to competing in Bahrain of their positions. McLaren and Mercedes declared their support for the race going ahead, with McLaren team principal Martin Whitmarsh quoted as saying McLaren would race in Bahrain so long as the event remained on the calendar.

==== Comparisons to 2006 Turkish Grand Prix political incident ====
At the 2006 Turkish Grand Prix, race winner Felipe Massa was presented his trophy by Mehmet Ali Talat, who was referred to as "President of the Turkish Republic of Northern Cyprus", a state that is only recognised by Turkey. The FIA investigated after the government of the Republic of Cyprus formally complained, fining the organisers of the race $5 million (TRY₺2,787,068), with an FIA spokesperson commenting that "political neutrality is fundamental to the FIA's role as the governing body of international motor sport. No compromise or violation of this neutrality is acceptable", which is reflected in Article 1 of the FIA Statutes, which states that "the FIA shall refrain from manifesting racial, political or religious discrimination in the course of its activities and from taking any action in this respect."

In the build-up to the 2012 Bahrain Grand Prix, commentators noted that organisers of the race were promoting the race under the slogan UNIF1ED — One Nation In Celebration, with the 'fi' in 'unified' stylised as an 'F1'. In an opinion piece posted on his website, journalist Keith Collantine described the campaign as being political in nature, and that the FIA's response was "[making] a mockery of the FIA’s claim of political neutrality" under their own statutes, while Sky Sports pit lane reporter Ted Kravitz commented that "every single team boss and every single person I’ve spoken to in Formula 1 has said, ‘I tell you what, though: they shouldn’t have done that UniF1ed’ – not least because you're not allowed to use Formula 1 for any political aims". When asked about the "UNIF1ED" campaign, Jean Todt avoided the question.

Journalists reporting on the conflict passed the opinion that the "UNIF1ED" campaign had failed to present the country as united, and instead had the opposite effect.

=== International pressure ===
As the race drew closer, several British Members of Parliament — including Jeremy Corbyn, Peter Bottomley, Bob Russell, and Andy Slaughter — called for the immediate cancellation of the race, expressing concerns, "the Formula One race will be used by the Bahrain government as an endorsement of its policies of suppression of dissent". The Labour Party also appealed directly to British drivers Jenson Button, Lewis Hamilton and Paul di Resta to boycott the race. Labour leader Ed Miliband and Shadow Home Secretary Yvette Cooper openly called for the race to be cancelled.

In a letter addressed to Red Bull and News Corporation CEOs Dietrich Mateschitz and Rupert Murdoch, Shadow Foreign Secretary Douglas Alexander urged the teams, media, and sponsors to boycott the event. While not explicitly referencing the Grand Prix, the White House condemned the violence on both sides of the conflict. On 19 April, it emerged that several sponsors, including Royal Dutch Shell, Vodafone and UBS, would not be using the race to entertain clients and partners. Corporate hospitality agencies also withdrew from the event, with some experiencing a downturn in business of up to eighty percent.

FIA President Jean Todt maintained his stance that the country was secure, and was quoted as saying "it is clear the Grand Prix can go ahead. There has been some controversy about it but the FIA is a sports organisation. We are only interested in sport, not politics". Bernie Ecclestone continued to describe the country as "quiet and peaceful", despite riot police attacking a crowd of protestors with stun grenades and pro-democracy activists calling for "days of rage" in the days preceding the race.

=== The teams arrive in Bahrain ===
"I trust in the FIA that they know all the information — I don't, personally — so we have to trust in their decision. I don't think they will ever want to put us at risk. They do a lot on safety for drivers, in terms of the circuits and the cars and what have you, and that's a priority for them. So I believe in the FIA's decision. If everything is straightforward and nothing happens, it's not even going to be in the back of my mind at all."

— 2009 World Champion Jenson Button, expressing his confidence in the decision by the FIA to see the race go ahead.

The first team members arrived in Bahrain on 17 April amid reports that sixty Shi'ite protest leaders had been arrested ahead of the race. In preparing for their arrival in Bahrain, teams took additional security precautions including hiring local security experts and planning specialist routes from the capital Manama to the circuit, some 40 kilometres (24.9 mi) away. News agency Agence France-Presse reported that their journalists and photographers had been blocked from entering Bahrain, and that several foreign journalists had had their visas delayed to prevent them from entering the country. AFP further reported that all personnel handling cameras were required to carry high-visibility markings at all times so as to make them easily identifiable and prevent them from covering events away from the circuit. Those journalists with approval to enter Bahrain turned to social media sites to circumvent press censorship. A heavy police presence was reported along the road from Manama to the circuit, including armoured vehicles and riot police.

Xevi Pujolar, race engineer to Williams driver Pastor Maldonado, uploaded a photo to Twitter reporting that "all [is] normal outside", while HRT driver and chairman of the Grand Prix Drivers' Association Pedro de la Rosa remarked that he was not concerned about the safety of the event. Reigning World Champion Sebastian Vettel added that he felt Bahrain was no more dangerous than Brazil; at the 2010 Brazilian Grand Prix in São Paulo, 2009 World Champion Jenson Button was involved in an incident in which armed gunmen attempted to hold up his road car after he left the circuit. Vettel's comments attracted criticism from former driver Rubens Barrichello, who said that there was no comparison between Brazil and Bahrain. Several drivers, including Button, Michael Schumacher and Romain Grosjean refused to comment either way on the political situation in Bahrain, reiterating their belief that the sport and local politics should be kept separate. In an opinion piece for The Independent, journalist Robert Fisk launched a scathing attack on the drivers for their neutral stance, calling Sebastian Vettel "clueless" and accusing Jenson Button and Lewis Hamilton of double standards, concluding that sports people in the 21st Century could no longer afford to distance themselves from moral values.

Porsche Supercup team MRS Racing, which was due to compete in the opening round of the 2012 Porsche Supercup season as part of the Grand Prix support bill, withdrew from the event on 18 April, citing concerns over security in the country as the reason for their withdrawal.

=== Force India petrol bomb incident ===
"We are looking at it from the point of view of ensuring the well being of everybody and the comfort of everybody is in place. And that is the key objective for us. We have had issues as you all know with things, and we have to make sure that the crew are comfortable in the environment and that is what we are working on. But the crew are totally committed to delivering qualifying and the race – and if it means a limited or no FP2 in order to achieve that, that is the decision we will have to take. We are doing the best we can to make sure the crew are safe. We have assurances and I don't believe there will be any issues. There will be protests and I think it was an unfortunate incident, but unfortunate incidents happen. When it is your team it happens to, you have to deal with it in a proper manner which is what we are doing."

— Force India deputy team principal Bob Fernley on the decision not to take part in the second Friday practice session.

On 18 April, former McLaren mechanic turned journalist Marc Priestley took to Twitter to report that a hire car used by Force India mechanics had been involved in a petrol bombing, though there were no injuries or damage. The team members had been travelling in an unmarked car and were held up by an impromptu roadblock which they were unable to clear before a petrol bomb exploded nearby. Further reports of the incident indicated that the mechanics were briefly exposed to tear gas fired by security forces on the protesters. One of the team members involved in the incident flew out of the country the next day. The mechanic — who was not named — chose to leave as he no longer felt comfortable in the country. A second mechanic left several hours later. Force India driver Nico Hülkenberg was disturbed by the chain of events, quoted as saying that it was "not right" that team members should have to fear for their personal safety.

Shortly after the first practice session ended on Friday morning, speculation in the media suggested that Force India would skip the second ninety-minute session due to take place later that day as they were not comfortable travelling back to Manama after dark. Although the second session was due to finish at 1530 local time, the time taken to pack up pit garages would see teams travelling from the circuit to the capital during Friday afternoon prayers, which have seen some or the largest organised demonstrations — or "days of rage" — both in Bahrain and throughout the Arab Spring. Darren Heath, a long-time photographer of the sport, described a similar feeling of unease up and down the pit lane. The team later confirmed that they were "considering" pulling out of the second session and were evaluating the possibility of taking part in a limited programme before retiring early, before electing not to take part in the second session at all. The team maintained their support of the decision to hold the race. Bernie Ecclestone was bemused by the team's decision to withdraw from the second practice session, stating that none of the other teams had expressed concern over their safety, and that he had offered to accompany Force India personnel back to Manama as reassurance, an offer they declined.

Members of the Sauber team also confirmed that they had experienced a similar encounter; a minibus full of team personnel came across a fire in the middle of a road and were approached by a group of masked men before the driver was able to pull away. A Brazilian journalist also reported witnessing police firing tear gas on demonstrators.

=== Al Khalifa addresses race critics ===
Shortly after the second practice session ended on 20 April, Bahrain's Crown Prince Salman bin Hamad bin Isa Al Khalifa made a statement before the media gathered at the event, in which he refused to cancel the race and described it as being vital to the future of Bahrain.

"I think cancelling just empowers extremists. I think for those of us who are trying to navigate a way out of this political problem, having the race allows us to build bridges across communities, and get people working together. It allows us to celebrate our nation as an idea that is positive, not one that is divisive. So I actually think that having the race has prevented extremists from doing what they think they need to do out of the world's attention.

I absolutely can guarantee that any problems that may or may not happen are not directed at F1. It goes to show that there are people who are out to cause chaos. You [in Britain] had these problems last year in your country and there is a very big different between protesting for political rights and rioting, and the attack that happened around Force India was aimed at the police. It was unprovoked, and it was quite dangerous. But at no time was anyone from F1 in danger.

I hope by coming here you understand that unlike what has been reported we are not trying to say we are perfect. We are a real country with real issues and we hope that you get a chance for all our complexities and all our shades, I genuinely believe that this race is a force for good."

— Crown Prince Salman bin Hamad bin Isa Al Khalifa of Bahrain, in a statement made to the media gathered at the Sakhir circuit on 20 April 2012.

At the time of Al Khalifa's address, tensions between protesters and the government were described as being at their highest since "Bloody Thursday", a series of night raids carried out by police against protesters at the Pearl Roundabout in Manama in March 2011 that resulted in the deaths of four protesters. His comments were criticised on several fronts, with media freedom groups pointing out that by limiting the access given to journalists, the government "wants the international attention brought by hosting a Grand Prix but doesn't want foreign journalists to wander from the race track where they might see political protests", thereby turning the race into a "propaganda exercise".

A protester was killed in clashes with police on the Friday before the race.

Hacktivist community Anonymous expressed outrage at the race and launched "Operation Bahrain", threatening to turn the Formula One website into "a smoking crater in cyber space" for the duration of the race weekend. The site was briefly taken down following a distributed denial-of-service attack, but was restored several hours later. A representative of Anonymous claimed further credit for launching similar attacks against the websites of several Bahrainian government ministries.

== See also ==
- Politics and sports
- 2011 Bahrain Grand Prix, which was cancelled due to the Bahraini uprising.
- 2013 Bahrain Grand Prix, which was also protested as part of the unrest.
- 1985 South African Grand Prix, which saw several teams boycott the event due to apartheid.
