= Nabeel Rajab =

Bahraini human rights activist (1964–2026)

- نبيل رجب
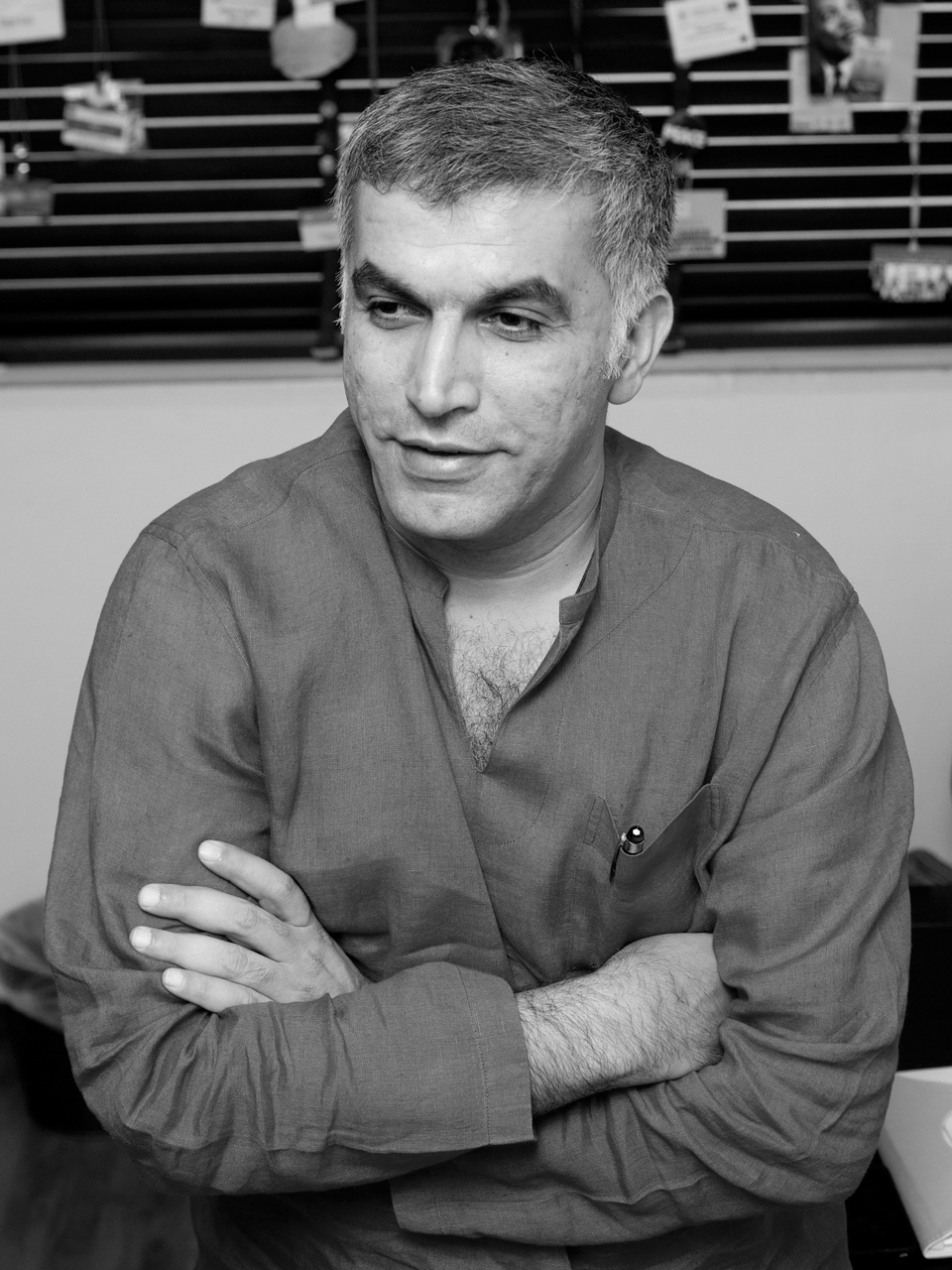
- Rajab in 2011
- Born: Nabeel Ahmed Abdulrasool Rajab; 1 September 1964; Bahrain and its Dependencies
- Died: 17 November 2026 (aged 62); Turkey
- Education: Bachelor's degree in political science and history, University of Pune
- Occupation: Human rights activist
- Years active: 1988–2026
- Organization: Bahrain Centre for Human Rights (BCHR)
- Board member of: List: International Federation for Human Rights (FIDH); Human Rights Watch; CARAM-Asia; The Arab Working Group for Media Monitoring; Bahrain Rehabilitation and Anti-Violence Organization (BRAVO); Persian Gulf Center for Human Rights (GCHR)
- Awards: Ion Ratiu Democracy Award (2011); British Silbury Prize (2011); Freedom of Expression Award (2012); Roger N. Baldwin Medal of Liberty (2012); Rafto Prize (2013)

Nabeel Ahmed Abdulrasool Rajab (Arabic: نبيل أحمد عبدالرسول رجب, romanized: Nabīl Aḥmad ʿAbd ar-Rasūl Rajab; 1 September 1964 – 17 November 2026) was a Bahraini human rights activist and opposition leader. He served as president of the Bahrain Centre for Human Rights (BCHR), a member of the Advisory Committee of Human Rights Watch's Middle East Division, deputy secretary general for the International Federation for Human Rights (FIDH), member of the Advisory Board of the Bahrain Rehabilitation and Anti-Violence Organization (BRAVO), co-founder of the Gulf Centre for Human Rights (GCHR), and chairman of CARAM Asia.

Rajab's human rights activism began during the 1990s uprising in Bahrain. Rajab has used social networking as a tool in human rights campaigning, which has led to conflicts with the Bahraini authorities. His activism has been acknowledged by international human rights organizations such as Front Line Defenders, Human Rights Watch (HRW), and Reporters Without Borders, which have highlighted his targeting by the Bahraini government.

In the 2011 Bahraini uprising, Rajab led several protests, frequently clashing with political authorities and Public Security Forces. He has critiqued not only the Bahraini government on its human rights record but also the stance of Bahrain's allies, including the United States. His activism, especially following the 2012 Grand Prix protests, led to his arrest and multiple incarcerations. In 2012, he was detained and sentenced to three months in prison for a Twitter post deemed as "insulting Bahrainis". Whilst still detained, he received a three-year prison sentence on charges related to his protest activities, later reduced to two years upon appeal. After being released in 2014, Rajab was re-arrested for criticizing the government via Twitter and was later the same year released on bail pending trial in 2015.

In a notable case on 21 February 2018, the High Criminal Court of Bahrain sentenced Rajab to five years in prison for statements critical of the Bahraini government's actions, including allegations he published of his mistreatment and torture within Jaw Prison in 2015. He was released from prison on 9 June 2020.

== Early life, education and business career ==
Nabeel Ahmed Abdulrasool Rajab was born on 1 September 1964, in Bahrain, into a middle-class family. He was married with two children. He finished his secondary school education in 1983 in Bahrain, specializing in science. He received his Bachelor of Arts degree in political science and history from the University of Pune (formerly University of Poona) in India in 1987. He earned his living as a "building contractor by trade". In February 2012, Rajab announced his intention to close down his business due to what he called government harassment. Rajab was a nephew of Mohamed Hasan Jawad, one of the Bahrain Thirteen who were imprisoned for taking part in the uprising in 2011. He was also a cousin of Hussain Jawad, a prominent human rights activist arrested in February 2015.

== Human rights activism ==
=== Early years ===
In an interview with Bahrain Mirror, Rajab spoke about his earliest human rights activities while still a student at Al Hoora secondary school and described two particularly significant formative experiences:

Two events affected me most, one when a colleague dropped himself from second floor to escape under-covered [sic] police who stormed [the] school. The second incident was when a dear teacher was arrested. That is when my voice started to rise and become annoying. I was caught vandalizing a school wall by writing apolitical human rights statements on school walls and was given the choice to either be submitted to police or to switch school. So I took the easy way out and since I was the top student back then, I choose to switch to Sheikh Abdul Aziz school.

Rajab traveled to India to study political science and history. He received his bachelor's degree but financial problems after his father became ill prevented him obtaining a master's degree. He returned to Bahrain to find employment. During his college years, he remained independent of political affiliations. According to Rajab, despite lacking a clear understanding of what constitutes a culture of human rights or knowledge of human rights standards and norms, he was active within the general Bahraini students union, speaking out against all forms of injustice. He also became involved in international campaigning on specific issues.

According to Rajab, he became involved in organized human rights activities during the 1990s uprising in Bahrain. In 1996 Rajab discussed the idea of setting up a human rights organization with Ali Rabea and Ibrahim Kamal Al Den. They introduced him to Salman Kamal Al Den, Sabeeka Al Najjar, Mohammed Al Motawa and other colleagues with whom they held secret meetings. Together they founded the Bahrain Human Rights Society in 2000.

=== Founding of human rights committees ===
With the ending of the oppressive State Security Law period in 2000, Rajab was able to begin working openly in the field of Human rights as one of the founders of the Bahrain Human Rights Society, one of the first human rights organizations in Bahrain. He subsequently fell out with some of the other founders. In 2002, following wide-ranging political reforms by the Bahraini government which allowed independent human rights groups to operate, Rajab worked with Abdulhadi al-Khawaja and others to found the Bahrain Centre for Human Rights (BCHR), a nonprofit non-governmental organization which works to promote human rights in Bahrain. Rajab was Training Program Officer and Senior Researcher at BCHR. He later became vice president and Head of International Relations until he later took over from Abdulhadi Al-Khawaja as BCHR president, a position he still held as of August 2012. In 2011, he along with Abdulhadi Al-Khawaja and Khalid Ibrahim founded the Gulf Centre for Human Rights. Rajab became the president of the newly founded rights group, and remained a Founding Director.

=== Rights of migrant workers ===
External videos
- Nabeel Rajab defending migrant workers, London, November 2010 on Vimeo

Rajab was one of the founders of the first migrant workers' protection committee in the Gulf Cooperation Council (GCC) countries, the Migrant Workers Protection Group (in 2003). On 28 April 2007, the Bahraini Parliament passed a law banning unmarried migrant workers from living in residential areas. BCHR issued a press release condemning this decision as discriminatory and promoting negative racist attitudes towards migrant workers. Rajab, then BCHR vice president, said:

It is appalling that Bahrain is willing to rest on the benefits of these people's hard work, and often their suffering, but that they refuse to live with them in equality and dignity. The solution is not to force migrant workers into ghettos, but to urge companies to improve living conditions for workers – and not to accommodate large numbers of workers in inadequate space, and to improve the standard of living for them.

In October 2009 Rajab was elected Chairperson of CARAM Asia for 2 years. (Note: CARAM is a regional non-governmental organization, based in the Malaysian capital, Kuala Lumpur, that works to defend the rights of migrant workers, reduce the risks to which their communities are vulnerable, including HIV, and promote their health rights.) On 24 February 2010, Rajab addressed the "World Congress against the Death Penalty" conference in Geneva on the subject of "Migrant Workers and the Death Penalty in Bahrain & Saudi Arabia". He drew attention to the exceptional vulnerability of migrant workers in countries with systemic abuses and rights violations.

=== Work with other international human rights organizations ===
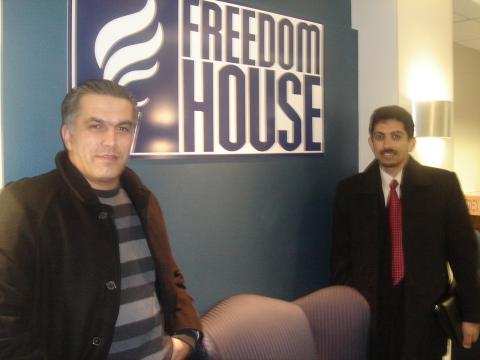
Nabeel Rajab's (left) visit to Freedom House along with Abdulhadi Alkhawaja (right)

Since December 2009, Rajab was a member of the Board of Advisors of the Middle East and North African division of Human Rights Watch, a position he still held in February 2012. In July 2010 the International Federation for Human Rights (FIDH) appointed Rajab to the position of Deputy Secretary General and FIDH permanent representative in the Gulf Cooperation Council countries. He was also a member of the Arab working group for media monitoring.

=== Recognition ===
In 2011, Rajab received the Ion Ratiu Democracy Award, presented annually by the Woodrow Wilson International Center for Scholars. The award citation praised him for having "worked tirelessly and at considerable personal peril to advance the cause of democratic freedoms and the civil rights of Bahraini citizens". On 13 September, Rajab received the British Silbury Prize to "facilitate his on-going humanitarian and human rights work". In December, the Arabic American organization for democracy and human rights listed him among the fifteen "leaders of the Arab Spring". Other activists from Bahrain included Abdulhadi al-Khawaja and Mohamed al-Maskati.

In 2012, the BCHR led by Rajab won the Index on Censorship's Freedom of Expression Awards. The award sponsored by Bindmans LLP aims to "recognise campaigners or activists who have fought repression, or have struggled to challenge political climates and perceptions." BCHR was also recipient of Roger Baldwin Medal of Liberty given by Human Rights First. and in 2013 it won the Rafto Prize "for their long and courageous fight for fundamental human rights".

== Government harassment prior to 2011 ==
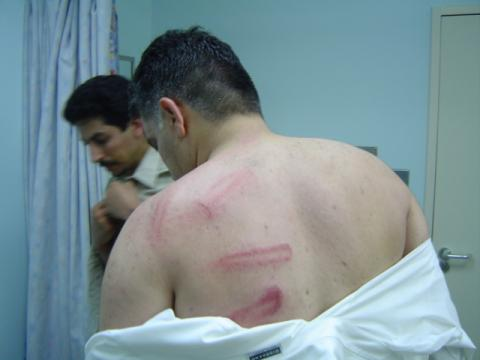
Marks on the back of Nabeel Rajab after being beaten by police at a 15 July 2005 protest

According to Front Line, Rajab has been the subject of ongoing harassment since 2005, including physical attacks and smear campaigns in the media (official TV, radio channels, Bahrain News Agency and newspapers close to government). Human Rights Watch and Reporters Without Borders have both described him as being targeted by Bahraini authorities for his human rights activities. In a postal campaign targeting Rajab and his wife thousands of letters were allegedly distributed.

According to an Immigration and Refugee Board of Canada report, on 15 July 2005, Nabeel and several others were beaten by Special Forces whilst attending a peaceful demonstration in solidarity with the Committee for the Unemployed. BCHR stated that Rajab suffered a spinal injury, a broken finger, a fractured arm and a head injury and was hospitalised for two weeks as a result.

During a government crackdown in the summer of 2010, Rajab's photograph was published a number of times by the pro-government Al-Watan Newspaper accusing him of supporting a terrorist network and being "active in publishing false reports and information". Gulf Daily News also published Rajab's photo naming him as one of the "supporters" of aforementioned network. A few days later, the Bahrain News Agency published a PowerPoint file about the alleged terrorist network. According to BCHR and Human Rights Watch, the file referred to Rajab as having been officially accused of involvement in the terrorist network. The claim was removed the following day.

During this time, the authorities imposed a ban preventing Rajab from engaging in any new business in Bahrain that made it difficult for him to earn a living. The ban was subsequently lifted without any official explanation. In mid-August 2010, a number of opposition activists were again arrested. According to Rajab, an order for his arrest was issued on 8 September but was cancelled on 18 October. Rajab was also subject to a travel ban during this period.

== 2011 Bahraini uprising ==
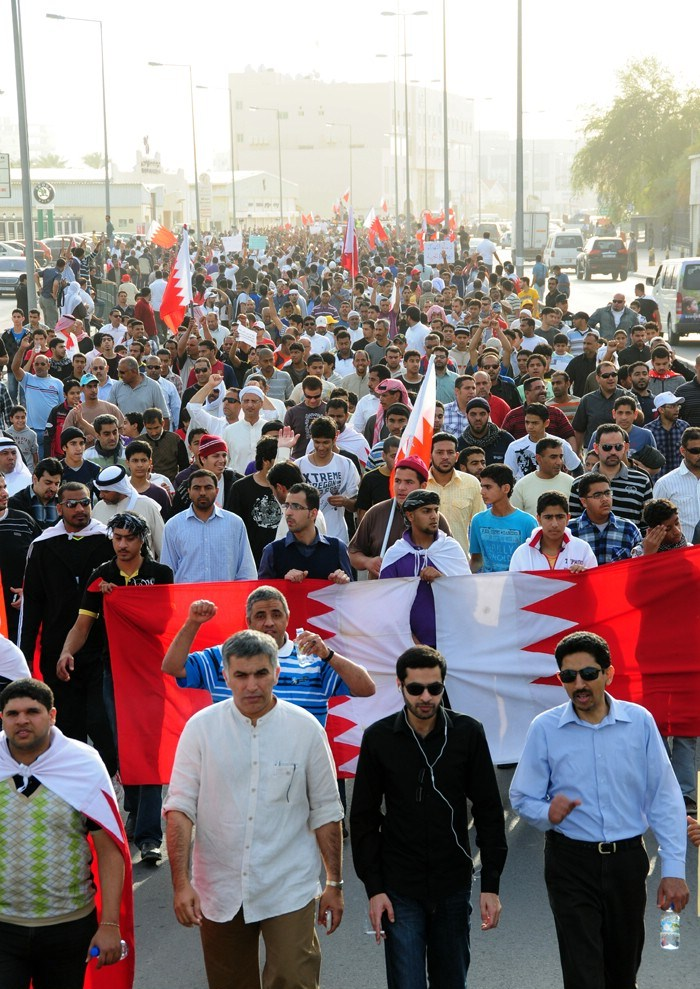
Nabeel Rajab (left) along with Ali Abdulemam (middle) and Abdulhadi Alkhawaja (right) taking part in a pro-democracy march on 23 February 2011

=== Background ===
Beginning in February 2011, Bahrain saw sustained pro-democracy protests, centered at Pearl Roundabout in the capital of Manama, as part of the wider Arab Spring. Authorities responded with a night raid on 17 February (later known as Bloody Thursday), which left four protesters dead and more than 300 injured. Protests continued for a month reaching over 100,000 participants in a nation of about 500,000 citizens, until more than a thousand troops and police from the Gulf Cooperation Council arrived at the request of government and a three-month state of emergency was declared. Authorities then cracked down on the protests. However, smaller-scale protests and clashes continued to occur almost daily, mostly in areas outside Manama's business districts, with some rare marches in the center of the capital city. As of April 2012, more than 80 people had died since the start of the uprising and as of January 2013, near-daily clashes between protesters and police were ongoing.

=== Role ===
Throughout the uprising Rajab was a "vocal critic of the human rights violations". He was one of the few who kept criticizing the government during state of emergency. Unlike other opposition parties who organized protests in Shia villages, Rajab insisted on staging them within the capital. He led many protests, several of them in Manama, putting him in standoffs with security forces. Rajab was named by Al Jazeera English the "unofficial leader of the 14 February movement" and The Atlantic labelled him "the de-facto leader of Bahrain's resurgent uprising." Rajab said he was a normal activist and that he was not engaged in planning for protests. Despite acknowledging it was "dangerous and costly", he expressed happiness about his role in the uprising.

On the other hand, Foreign Policy mentioned that a big portion of the Sunni community think of Rajab as a troublemaker. The majority sect in Bahrain is Shia Muslims, Sunni Muslims comprise a substantial minority and hold the top positions of power. The largest opposition party is Al Wefaq which is a Shia Islamist movement (albeit internationally recognized as moderate and tightly allied with secular opposition parties). One source of opposition to Rajab (who has taken anti-sectarian stands) and his movement is the fear (particularly among Sunnis) that they could bring Shia Islamists to power.

In the early hours of 20 March 2011, a group of 20 to 25 masked men, some armed with rifles and accompanied by dozens of uniformed Bahraini security forces, broke into Rajab's house. Rajab was detained and his files and a computer were confiscated. He reported that they blindfolded and handcuffed him and put him into the back of a vehicle before verbally abusing, beating and threatening to rape him. He claimed that they kicked him when he refused to say that he loved the prime minister. He was taken to a Ministry of Interior detention facility in Adliya, a suburb of Manama. After being briefly questioned about someone he did not know, he was released.

On 10 April, officials publicly accused Rajab of fabricating photos posted on his Twitter account of the body of Ali Isa Ibrahim Saqer, who died in detention on 9 April. The Ministry of Interior announced that Rajab would be referred to the Military Prosecutor for legal action. The photos showed slash marks all over Saqer's back and other signs of physical abuse, and were also stated to be accurate by an HRW researcher who had seen the body prior to burial. Five prison guards were subsequently charged with Saqer's death.

External videos
- Front Line interview with Nabeel Rajab about attacks on his house on YouTube

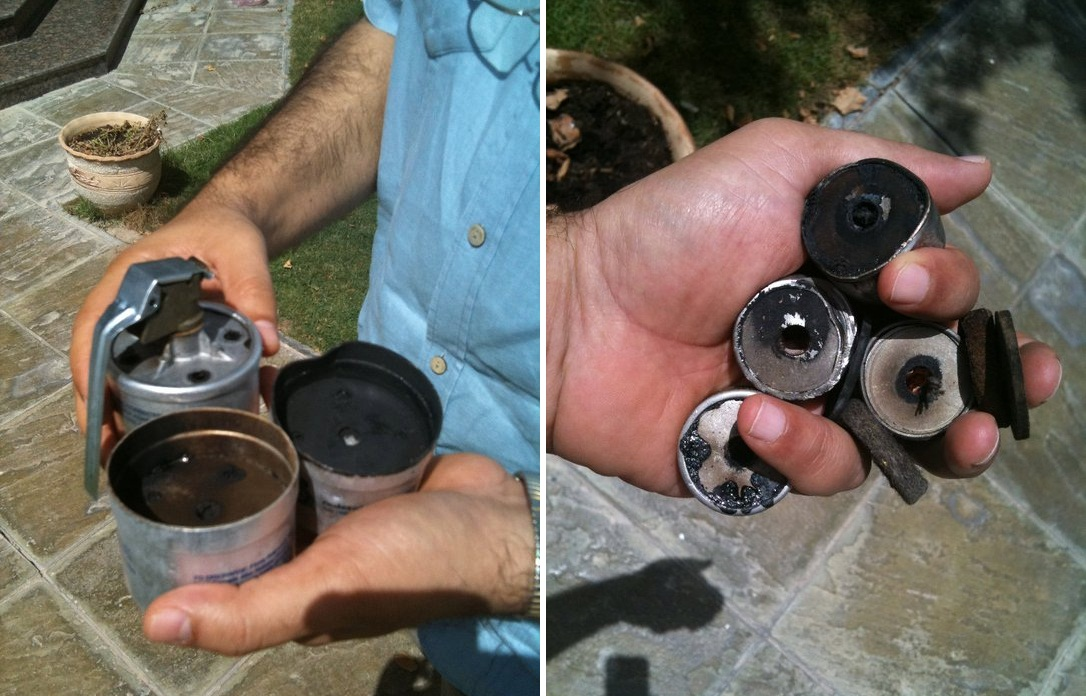
Tear gas fired at Rajab's house on 18 April (left) and 21 May (right)

In incidents on 18 April 21 May and 15 December, tear gas grenades were fired at Rajab's house in the village of Bani Jamra by unknown assailants. In the first incident, HRW identified the grenades thrown into the Rajab family's compound as US-manufactured munitions to which only Bahrain's security forces would have had access. Tear gas penetrated into the adjacent home of Rajab's 78-year-old mother who suffers from respiratory disease, causing her great distress. On 21 May, four gas grenades were fired at the house. This time, according to Rajab, the grenades were smaller than those used in the mid-April assault and there were no marks identifying the manufacturer.

According to the BCHR, authorities organized an anonymous smear campaign targeting Rajab and Maryam al-Khawaja in May 2011. Later in the month Rajab stated that his uncle, Mohammad Hassan Mohammad Jawad (65 years old), an arrested activist, was being tortured because of their relationship. He also stated that he was prevented by Muharraq airport security staff from traveling to Beirut to attend an International Freedom of Expression Exchange (IFEX) meeting in May and an Amnesty International conference in June.

On 31 May, just after the King of Bahrain had called for dialogue without preconditions to begin in early July the military National Safety Court issued an order for Rajab's arrest along with those of prominent Al Wefaq parliamentarians. Rajab was accused of spreading false news and statements about the situation in Bahrain and promoting hatred and disrespect of a specific religious sect, in addition to humiliating the king of Bahrain. All the detainees were released the same day.

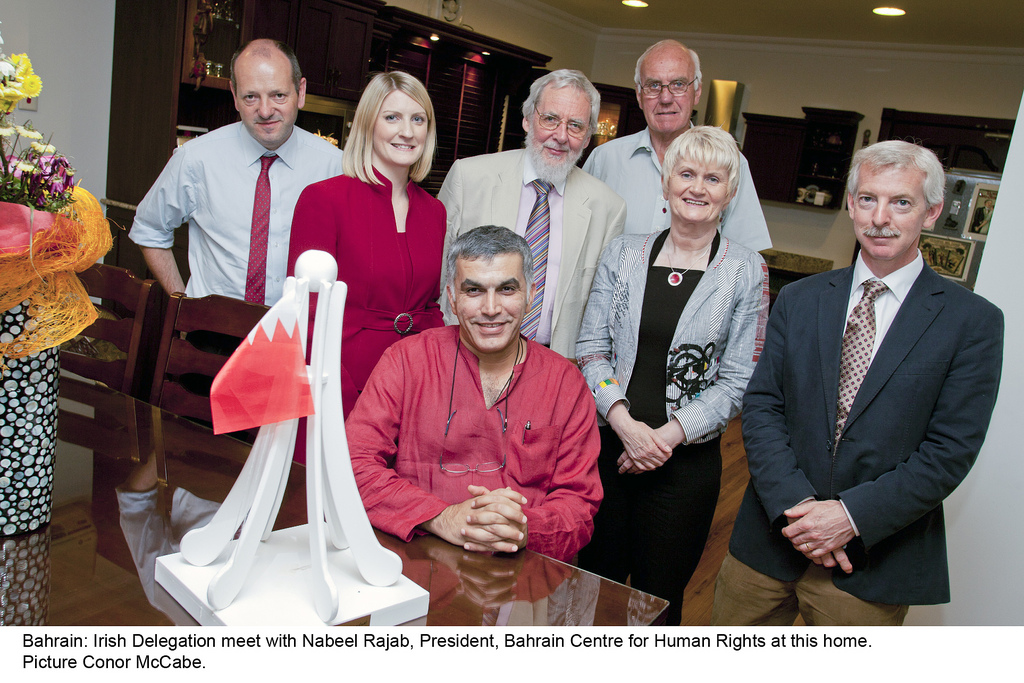
Irish Delegation meet with Nabeel Rajab at his home on 14 July.

In November, Rajab took part in a six-member international fact finding mission. It released a 27-page report and gave eleven recommendations addressing human rights violations in Bahrain. In December, Rajab and two other human rights activists received death threats on Twitter by a retired security official. On 6 January 2012, after leading a night peaceful protest in Fareeq el-Makharqa in Manama, Rajab was hospitalized and briefly detained with injuries from an alleged beating, which the opposition blamed on security forces. Via their Twitter account, the Ministry of the Interior denied the accusation, saying police found Rajab "lying on the ground" and referred him to hospital.

On 12 February, Rajab was briefly detained after he tried to march along with his family to the location of the symbolic Pearl Roundabout in Manama. Rajab explained that he took this move to be a model to encourage people from different ages to take part in protests. Following the media attention on protests during the Formula 1 race in April 2012, the government launched a "legal crackdown" in which Rajab was arrested and released several times.

=== May 2012 arrest ===
On 5 May, Rajab was arrested at Bahrain International Airport on his arrival from Lebanon the day before a scheduled court hearing relating to a march he had attended in March. Julian Assange said he believed Rajab's arrest was linked to his appearance on Assange's World Tomorrow television talk-show and Project on Middle East Democracy (POMED) associated it with an interview with the BBC's HARDtalk. The following day the Ministry of the Interior issued a statement that Rajab had been arrested for "committing a number of crimes". Before the arrest, Rajab had stated he would not attend the trial, because the Judiciary of Bahrain was "a tool used against human rights defenders and people calling for democracy and justice".

On 6 May, Rajab was charged with "insulting a statutory body via Twitter," his lawyer said. The online newspaper Manama Voice identified Rajab's tweets criticizing the Ministry of Interior as the likely cause. The Tweet suggested the ministry did not carry out "proper investigations into civilian deaths," which was already confirmed by BICI report that labelled the findings of the Interior Ministry, in general, as "in many cases, flawed and biased in its favour."

Rajab pleaded not guilty to the charge against him, but the prosecutor decided to keep him in detention for 7 days. On 12 May, the public prosecution extended his detention by one week. On 16 May, fifty-five lawyers were present in court in solidarity with Rajab who pleaded not guilty again and stated that the charge against him was "malicious". Despite being granted bail on 20 May, Rajab was kept in detention on a further charge of "organizing illegal protests". Activists accused the Bahraini authorities of trying to find any way of keeping Rajab off the streets.

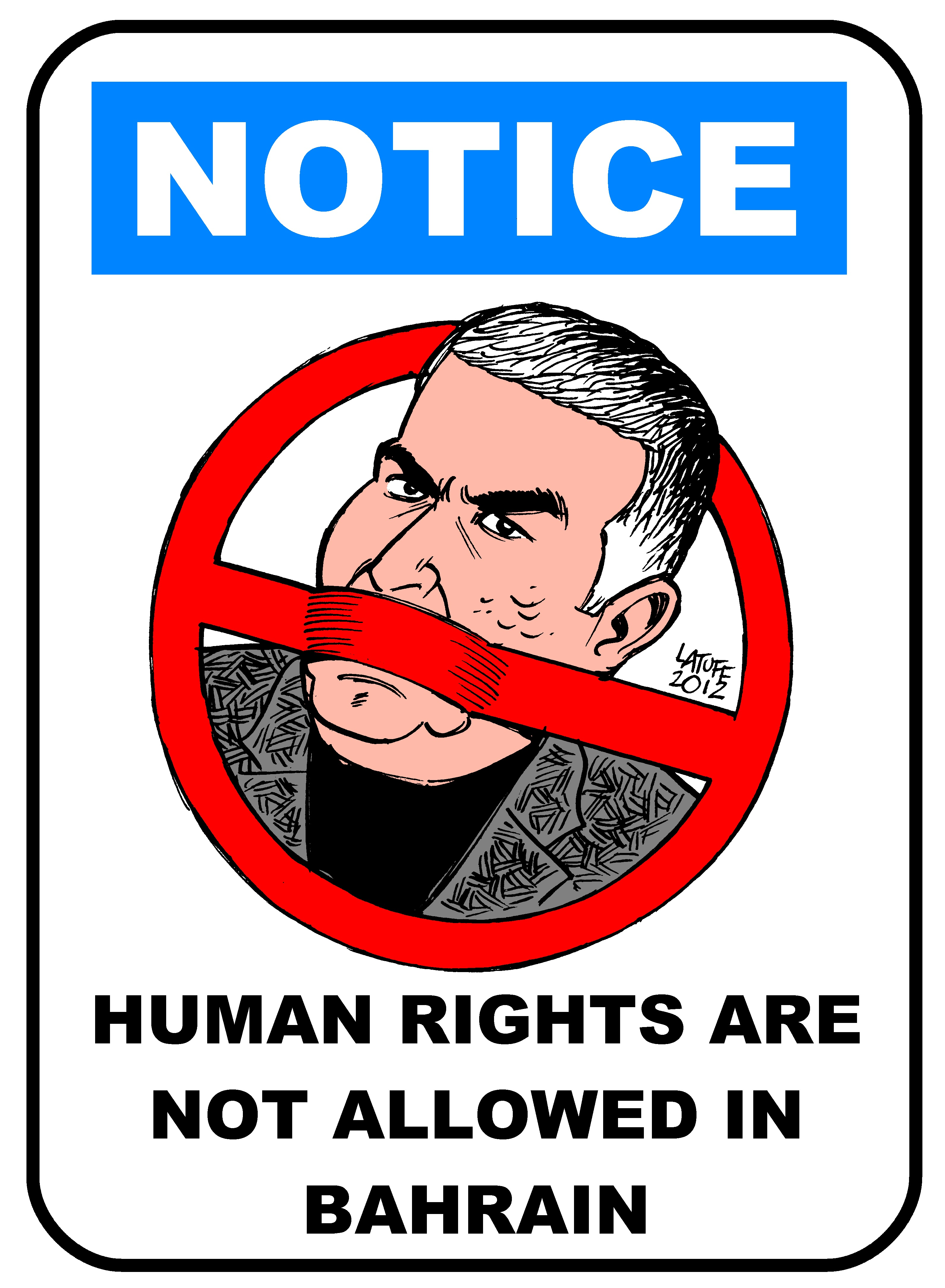
Political cartoon by Carlos Latuff after Rajab was arrested in May 2012

Spokesman of the United Nations High Commissioner for Human Rights said she was concerned at the arrest of Rajab. The Australian Senate unanimously passed a ruling demanding their government to "[m]ake direct representations to Bahraini authorities for the immediate release of Nabeel Rajab." Amnesty International designated Rajab a prisoner of conscience and called for his immediate and unconditional release. Human rights groups Arab Program for Human Rights Activists, BCHR, Cairo Institute for Human Rights Studies, FIDH, Freedom House, GCHR, and the political party Al Wefaq demanded his release. Bahrain Forum for Human Rights called Ban Ki-moon, the Secretary-General of the United Nations to intervene for the release of Rajab. Political cartoonist Carlos Latuff created a cartoon about Rajab.

On 28 May, spending twenty four days in detention, Rajab was released on bail and placed on a travel ban.

=== June 2012 arrest ===
After being briefly released, Rajab was re-arrested on 6 June on a charge of "publicly insulting residents of a Sunni-dominated neighbourhood for their ties to the ruling dynasty", the fifth charge brought against him in a period of one month. Human Rights Watch and other rights group participating in Bahrain's Universal Periodic Review session demanded release of Rajab. He was released on bail on 27 June still facing three charges relating to Twitter activity and two about organizing "illegal" protests.

=== July 2012 arrest ===
On 7 July, Rajab was banned from traveling, and two days later he was arrested by more than a dozen of masked security personnel from his house few hours after a court sentenced him to three-month prison for a Tweet out of six in which he criticized the prime minister that the court found had insulted Bahrainis. The Observatory for the Protection of Human Rights Defenders described the arrest as an "arbitrary detention". In the Tweet Rajab said "everyone knows you [prime minister] are not popular and if it weren't for the need for money, [the Muharraq residents] would not have welcomed you." The charge was "publicly vilifying the people of al-Muharraq and questioning their patriotism with disgraceful expressions posted via social networking websites."

Rajab's lawyer said the verdict was unexpected because the charge of insult was normally punished by a fine. Human Rights First, Human Rights Watch and nineteen members of the United States Congress called for Rajab's release. Four Bahraini rights group issued a joint statement condemning the sentence and five political parties held a sit-in in solidarity with Rajab. Yousif al-Mahafdha of BCHR said "[t]hey arrested him to send a message to all activists that you will get arrested like him if you talk to the media".

The appeal was scheduled for 23 August, when Rajab was acquitted of the charge, but remained in custody on another sentence. According to the Bahrain News Agency, the judge decided to release Rajab, because "he was not satisfied with the evidence put forward". During the trial, Rajab complained of "physical and psychological torture" in prison and solitary confinement in a "dark cell", his lawyer reported.

=== August 2012 sentence ===
On 16 August, Rajab was sentenced to one year in prison on each of three charges for a total of three years. Charges were "involvement in illegal practices and inciting gatherings and calling for unauthorized marches through social networking sites", "participation in an illegal assembly", and "participation in an illegal gathering and calling for a march without prior notification." Public prosecutors stated that Rajab's "provocation of his supporters" had incited violence, including the road blockades and petrol bomb attacks. "The Public Prosecution produced evidence that the accused had called in public speeches for a demonstration to confront public security personnel, inciting violence and escalation against law enforcement officers, resulting in deaths during those confrontations", a public prosecutor said. The appeal was scheduled to take place on 10 September. Rajab was placed in al-Jaw prison. On 20 August, he was allowed to make a two-minute call to his family. He told them he was in solitary confinement with no access to newspapers.

==== Domestic response ====
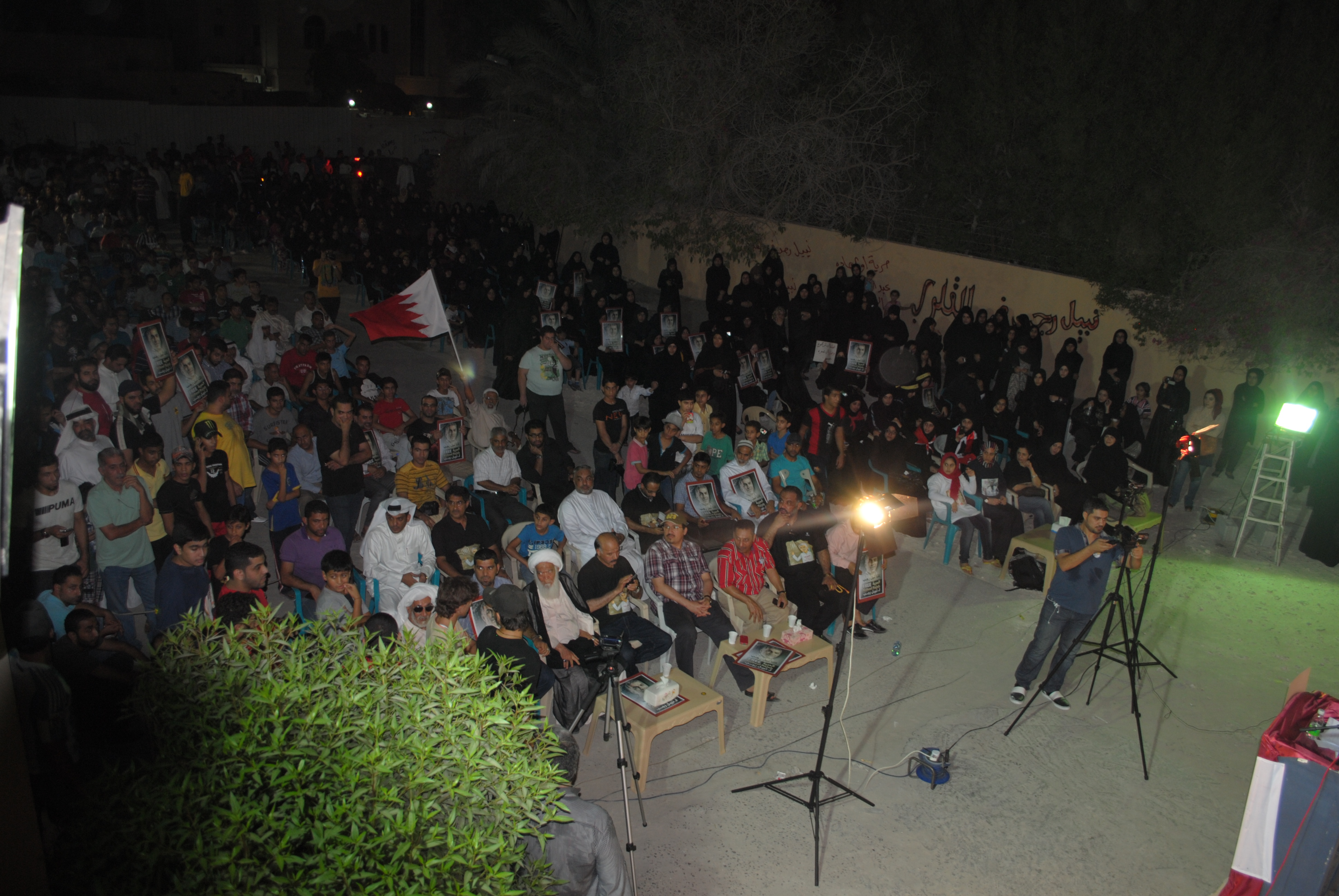
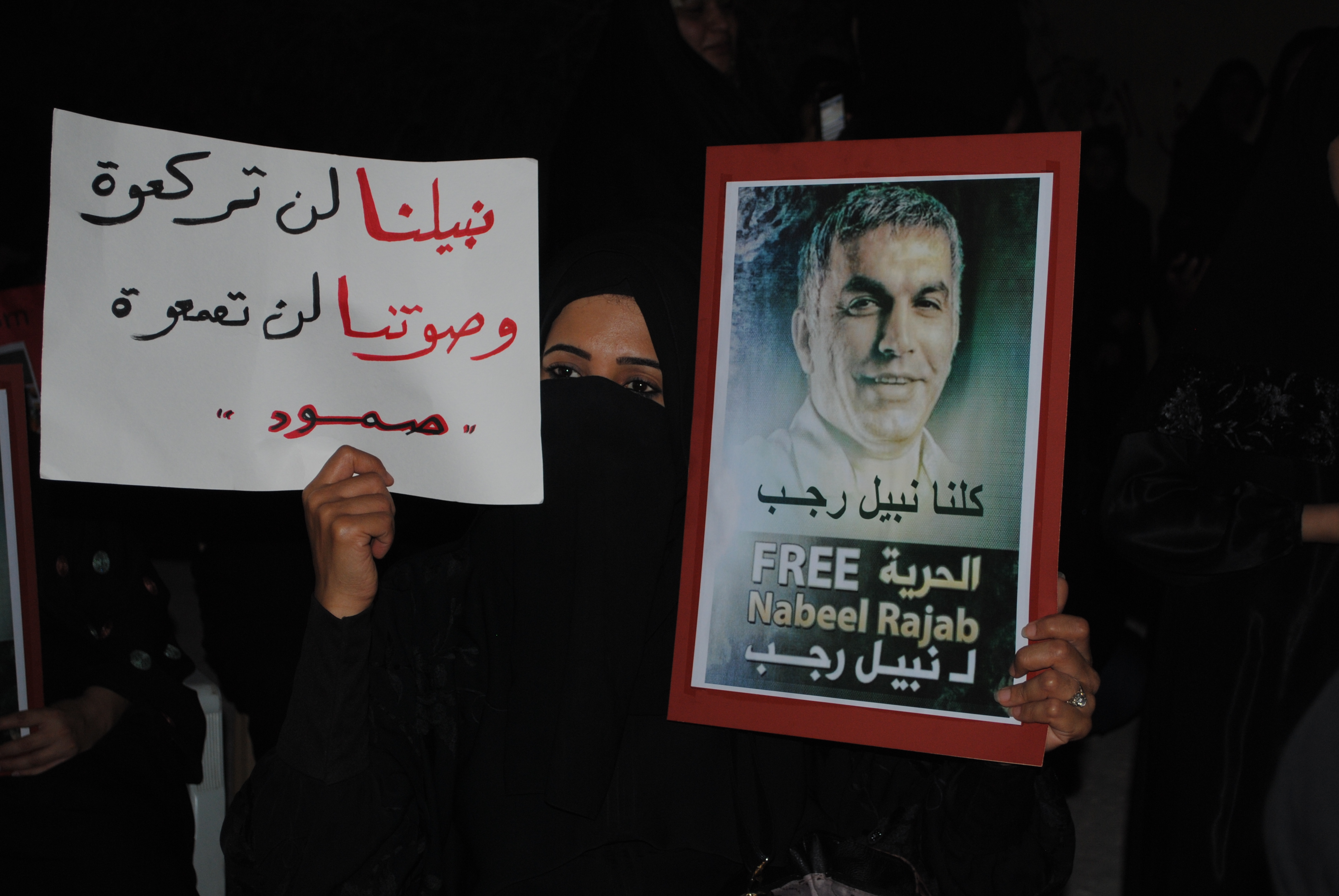
A number of people held a sit-in in solidarity with Rajab on 23 August
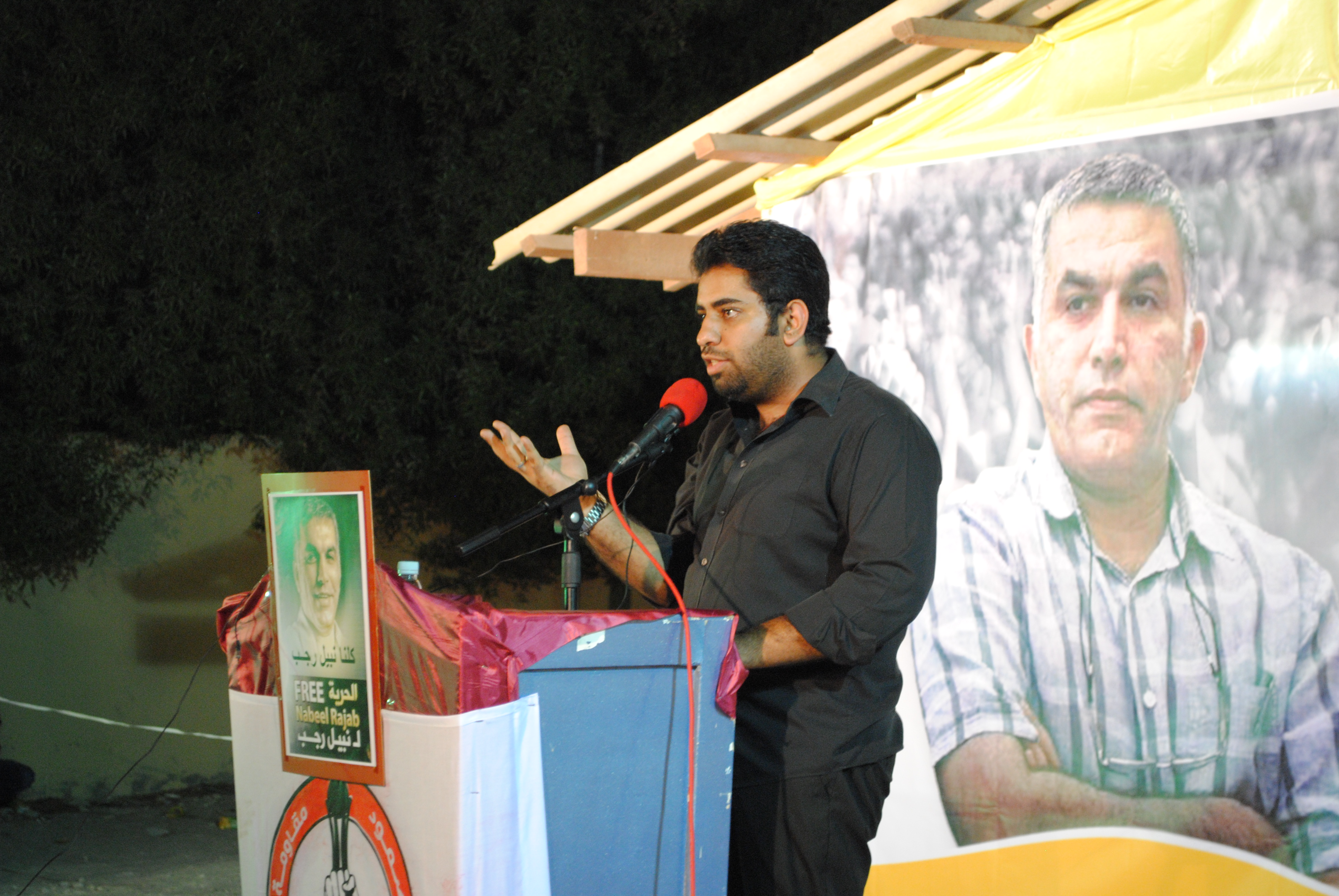
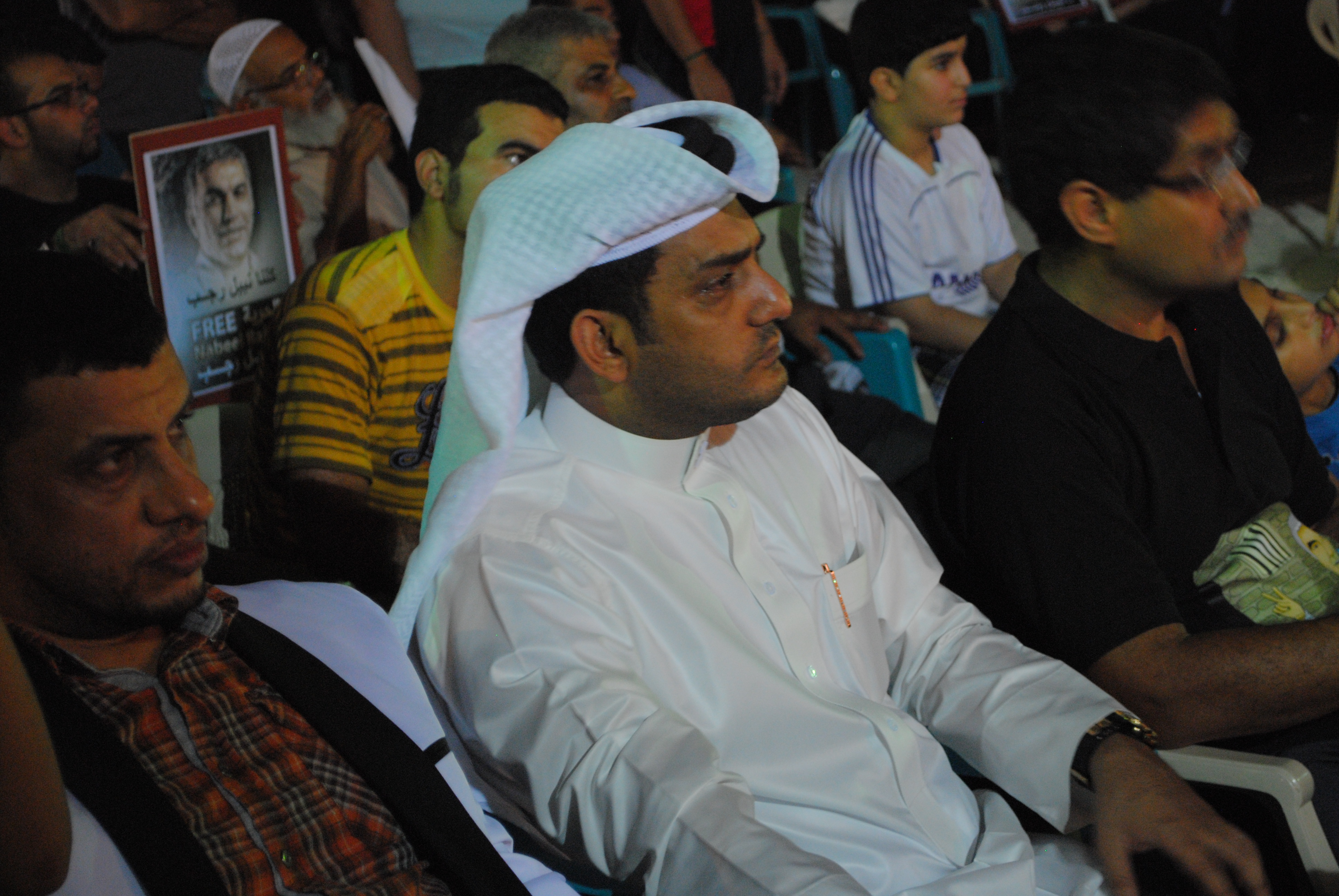
Left to right. Mohamed al-Maskati giving a speech in the sit-in and Mohamed Albuflasa listening among the crowd

Samira Rajab, the country's Minister of State for Information (and Rajab's cousin twice over) declared that Rajab had enjoyed a fair trial with unrestricted access to legal assistance. She said that action had been taken against him because although claiming to be a human rights activist he had in fact been engaging in political activity, a justification similar to that offered by an officially-appointed MP for the trial of Bahrain health workers.

Rajab's wife accused the minister of lying to the international media and fabricating film footage played during a press conference. She said that the court proceedings had clearly demonstrated the absence of justice and an independent judiciary. Rajab's son quoted his father as saying, "Jail me 3 years or 30, I will never give up". Mr. Jishi, Rajab's lawyer, said the government was "sending a message", further emphasised by the King of Bahrain's speech that week referring to a duty to "protect peaceful, good-natured citizens who do not seek to usurp power".

BCHR said that the only reason Rajab had been targeted was to prevent him from continuing his legitimate and peaceful human rights work. The Al Wefaq political party said Rajab's sentence was further evidence of the government's unwillingness to find a solution to the crisis, noting that political detainees were prisoners of conscience and the regime had no right to use them as hostages "as part of its security solution to the ongoing political crisis". Justin Gengler, a Bahrain researcher based in Qatar, remarked that Bahrain's 'reformist' king was unfortunately beginning to sound eerily like his uncle. A number of political and human rights activists held a sit-in in solidarity with Rajab at National Democratic Action Society headquarters on 18 August. On 31 August, thousands of protesters filled a three-kilometer highway chanting for the release of Rajab.

==== International response ====
A number of independent United Nations experts including the United Nations Special Rapporteur on human rights defenders and the Special Rapporteur on freedom of peaceful assembly and of association expressed serious concern about the government of Bahrain's "campaign of persecution" directed against rights activists and called for Nabeel Rajab's immediate release. They urged the Bahraini authorities to respect the rights to peaceful assembly and freedom of expression and release anyone arbitrarily detained for exercising legitimate freedoms without delay.

The United States and European Union criticized the sentence. A United States Department of State spokesperson described the sentence as deeply troubling, affirming the fundamental freedom of all to participate in civil acts of peaceful disobedience. The State Department called on the government of Bahrain "to take steps to build confidence across Bahraini society" and "begin a really meaningful dialogue with the political opposition and civil society" as actions like Rajab's sentencing would cause further divisions within Bahraini society.

Sanjeev Bery of Amnesty International criticized the US reaction as late and insufficient. He highlighted Michael Posner's testimony in which he stated that Rajab's case was "a bit more complicated" and Victoria Nuland's answers to reporters in which "it took [her] so long" to call for Rajab's release. FIDH said the US reaction was "woefully insufficient" and that it was "turn[ing] a blind eye to human rights violations in Bahrain". BCHR criticized the US "silent reaction" towards the arrest. "[T]he lack of pressure from the US administration appears to be linked with the Bahraini government's willingness to escalate," it added.

The European Union noted the verdict with concern and expected it to be "reconsidered in the appeal process". A spokesperson for the French Foreign Office affirmed the right of freedom of expression and called for dialogue as a means to solve the political crisis. "We are disturbed by the harsh sentence imposed on Mr. Rajab and hope it will be reviewed on appeal," spokesperson added. A spokesperson for the UK Foreign Office expressed concern at the length of the sentence and called on opposition activists to avoid inciting "violence or other illegal acts". "We urge the Bahraini Government to act proportionately in all cases. The right of individuals to peaceful protest and freedom of expression is a fundamental part of any modern democracy and must be respected," spokesperson added.

The sentence was sharply criticized by rights groups. Forty three rights groups signed a joint appeal to release Rajab. Brian Dooley of Human Rights First found the verdict shocking even by Bahrain's "abysmal" standards on human rights. He added that the regime could not be seen as serious about human rights reform when it jailed one of the world's most prominent activists to prison for three years. Referring to a "dark day for justice" in Bahrain, Amnesty International said that the use of such blatant ruthless tactics to suppress dissenting voices could leave the international community under no illusion that Bahrain was on the path of reform. Human Rights Watch argued that the government had yet to show that Rajab had done any more than exercise his right to free expression and peaceful assembly and demanded his release.

FIDH, Front Line Defenders, Gulf Centre for Human Rights, Index on Censorship, IFEX, Julian Assange, Palestinian Society for the Protection of Human Rights, Reporters Without Borders and World Organization Against Torture criticized the sentence and called for Rajab's immediate release. Jane Kinninmont of Chatham House reported speculation that the case might be used as a political bargaining chip in efforts to prepare the ground for a fresh political dialogue urged by Bahrain's western allies. She added that the verdict sends "a signal that the government is taking a harder line on protests." History professor Toby C. Jones said the sentence "represents the end of any pretense of reforms" in Bahrain.

==== Trial of appeal ====
On 11 December 2012, the court of appeal reduced the sentence of Rajab to two years in prison after it cleared him of insulting police. The court however upheld the charge of "illegal gathering". Rajab had expected to be released, according to his wife. The United States Assistant Secretary of State, Michael Posner called the Bahraini authorities to drop all charges related to non-violent activism. Jeo Stork of HRW criticized the judiciary as being "very politicized" and called the court decision "bizarre".

The Gulf Center for Human Rights said that the defense team had faced many obstacles during the trial of appeal including that the International experts who were introduced to the court as defense witnesses were denied entry at Bahrain international airport, and the defense team were denied access to the evidences submitted by the prosecution. Amnesty International's director for the Middle East and North Africa commented that "The appeal court's gesture to reduce Nabeel Rajab's sentence by one year is completely hollow given that he shouldn't be serving any time in prison in the first place". Other human rights organizations, including Human Rights First, Front Line Defenders, the International Federation for Human Rights (FIDH) and the World Organisation Against Torture (OMCT) condemned the ruling of the court of appeal and called for the immediate release of Nabeel Rajab.

In December 2013, a court denied Rajab early release after he had served three-quarters of his sentence. According to Bahraini law, a prisoner may be eligible for early release after serving three-quarters of the sentence. Rajab's lawyer stated that the court gave no reason for rejecting early release.

==== Release ====
On 24 May 2014, Rajab was released from prison after serving his full term of 2 years. FIDH welcomed the move, with its Secretary General Amina Bouayach travelling to Bahrain to meet Rajab as soon as he was released. "It is an immense pleasure to see our friend and colleague Nabeel again. We have been waiting for this moment for a very long time," Bouayach said. Rajab was happy to be out and called for the release of other prisoners and for "respect for human rights".

=== October 2014 arrest ===
On 1 October, Rajab was arrested after being summoned to the Criminal Investigation Directorate. He had just returned from a two-month advocacy campaign in Europe in which he criticized the government and called for international action against it. He was charged with "publicly insulting official institutions" after he had criticized the Ministry of Interior and Ministry of Defense on Twitter for allegedly being the "first ideological incubator" of Bahrainis who had joined the Islamic State of Iraq and the Levant (ISIL). A month earlier, one security officer at Ministry of Interior was terminated from employment after joining ISIL and calling on other officers to defect. The Public Prosecutor said Rajab had acknowledged publishing the comments on Twitter.

On his first hearing on 19 October, Rajab denied charges against him. He was released on the second hearing on 2 November with the next hearing scheduled for 20 January. Rajab said he was targeted because of his peaceful advocacy for human rights and democracy and that he does not have any regrets for doing so.

=== July 2015 release ===
On 10 July, King Hamad issued a royal decree granting Rajab, who was sentenced to six months, a special pardon, Bahrain News Agency reported.

=== June 2016 arrest ===
On 13 June, he was arrested in an early morning raid on his home in the village of Bani Jamra, near Manama, according to his family without saying any reasons.

=== July 2017 sentence ===
On 10 July, he was sentenced to two years in jail by a Bahraini court after finding him guilty of "disseminating false news, statements and rumours about the internal situation of the kingdom that would undermine its prestige and status", according to a judicial source.

=== February 2018 sentence ===
On 21 February 2018, Rajab was sentenced by the High Criminal Court of Bahrain to a further five years in jail for tweets and documentation of human rights violations. The first charge was for "offending national institutions" in connection to his documentation of mistreatment and torture in Bahrain's Jaw Prison in March 2015. (See BCHR's report: Inside Jau: Government Brutality in Bahrain’s Central Prison). The second charge of "spreading rumors during wartime" related to his reporting on civilian deaths in Yemen, in contravention of a government prohibition of any public mention that is critical of the conflict. He was also charged under the Bahrain penal code with "offending a foreign country" (Saudi Arabia).

=== June 2020 release ===
On 9 June 2020, Bahrain released Rajab from prison and granted him the permission to serve "an alternative sentence”, in his home.

=== Criticism of the United States ===
Rajab was critical of the US role in Bahrain throughout the uprising. On 26 July 2011, in an interview with Al Jazeera English, he expressed disappointment at US silence and the inconsistent way in which US standards of democracy and human rights were applied to countries with which they had problems, but not to dictatorships with whom they had good relations. On 21 December 2011, in an interview with National Post, he criticized US support for royal dictatorships in the region and contrasted the hard attitude shown towards Syria and Libya with the soft attitude towards allies.

In a World Tomorrow episode broadcast on 8 May 2012, Rajab accused the US of opposing democracy in Bahrain when it asked Russia not to sell arms for Syria while selling arms to Bahrain, and in July, shortly before Rajab's arrest, he noted that the presence of US Fifth Fleet in Bahrain made the struggle against the monarchy more difficult because US support, accompanied by the support, or silence, of the international community, was seen as giving the green light for repression and attacks on human rights defenders.

== Online activity ==
Rajab was an active user of online media in his human rights work, in particular social networking sites such as Facebook and Twitter. He stopped posting in Internet forums in order to encourage support for social network-based campaigning. He devoted significant time and effort to his Twitter account, created in March 2009, posting mostly in Arabic, and in the 2011 Forbes magazine list of the 100 top Arabs on Twitter was ranked number 43, with 36,040 followers (322,000 as of August 2016). He ranked number 1 in Bahrain.

Even though on this occasion Rajab was personally congratulated by the Minister, his use of Twitter to publicise human rights abuses has brought him into repeated conflict with the authorities. In April 2011 he was threatened with prosecution for the publication on his Twitter account of an allegedly fabricated image of the body of Ali Issa Saqer showing signs of torture in custody; the threats were withdrawn after prison guards were charged with Saqer's death. The Arabic Network for Human Rights Information (ANHRI) described the threat against Rajab of the first ever charge in the Arab world involving "tweeting" (publishing information on Twitter) as an illustration of the Bahraini government's implacable hostility towards freedom of expression and Internet freedom.

In 2012 Rajab's Twitter-based campaigning led firstly to his detention for three weeks (two weeks on the charge of "insulting a statutory body via Twitter" and another week for "organizing illegal protests") after he published tweets critical of the Ministry of Interior (leading to criticism of the authorities by international human rights organizations), then to a three-month prison sentence for a Tweet criticizing the prime minister, and eventually in August 2012 he was given three further consecutive one-year prison sentences for illegal political activities involving the use of social networking sites. On 23 August, after spending more than half of his sentence, Rajab was acquitted of Twitter charge in which he criticized the prime minister, but remained in jail while appealing the other prison sentence.

== Death ==
Rajab died on 17 November 2026, at the age of 62, after being found unresponsive at his family's home in Turkey.
