= Yousef al-Mahafdha =

Bahraini activist

Sayed Yusuf Almuhfdha is a human rights advisor and researcher.

== Involvement in Bahraini Uprising ==
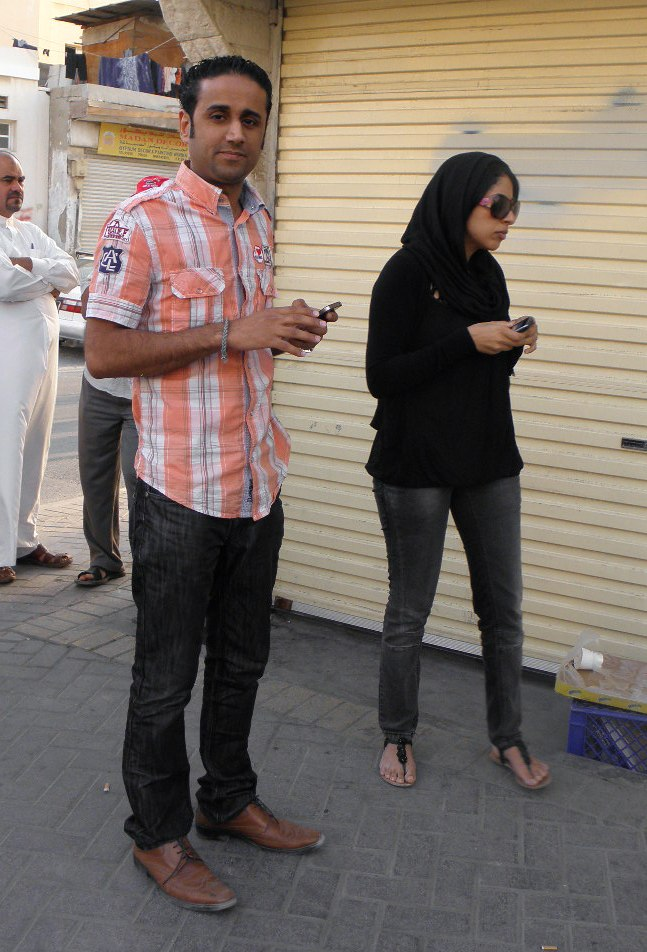
Al-Mahafdha and Zainab al-Khawaja monitoring a protest in Jidhafs and tweeting about updates

In February 2011, large-scale pro-democracy protests began in Bahrain as part of the international Arab Spring. Al-Mahafdha is a member of the board of directors at BCHR who participated in the 12 March 2011 march on the royal palace. Eight days later, his family reported that a group of 25 plainclothes police officers had come to his home at night and searched it, though al-Mahafda himself had been absent. His family was reportedly told that if al-Mahafda did not come to the police station voluntarily, the police officers would return "every night" until he did. BCHR also alleged that security forces were working to block al-Mahafdha's travels. On 5 December 2011, al-Mahafdha, Rajab, and Mohammed Al-Maskati of the Bahrain Youth Society for Human Rights were named in a death threat by Adel Flaifel, a former State Securities Services official, causing the International Federation for Human Rights and World Organisation Against Torture to call for an international letter-writing campaign on their behalf. On 6 January 2012, a stun grenade thrown by security forces injured al-Mahafda's arm during a protest.

On 25 January 2012, al-Mahafdha participated in an open seminar organised by Al Wefaq, Bahrain's main opposition party, in which he criticized the government on freedom of press, suppression of peaceful protests, blocking opposition websites and delaying visits of international human rights organizations. After the arrest of BCHR president Nabeel Rajab, al-Mahafdha became acting head of the organization.

== Arrests ==
Al-Mahafdha was arrested several times at checkpoints in August, September, and October 2012, but was not charged with a crime and was quickly released in each instance.

Al-Mahafdha was arrested on 2 November 2012 in the village of Diraz in Manama for joining an "illegal gathering" and "taking part in an unauthorised march". He was reportedly observing police actions during a demonstration for the BCHR. The Washington Post described the arrest as likely to "embolden Shiite-led demonstrators seeking a greater political voice in the Sunni-ruled nation". Amnesty International designated him a prisoner of conscience, "detained solely for exercising his rights to freedom of expression, association and assembly", and called for his immediate release.
