= Karbabad =

Village in the Kingdom of Bahrain

Coordinates: 26°14′N 50°32′E

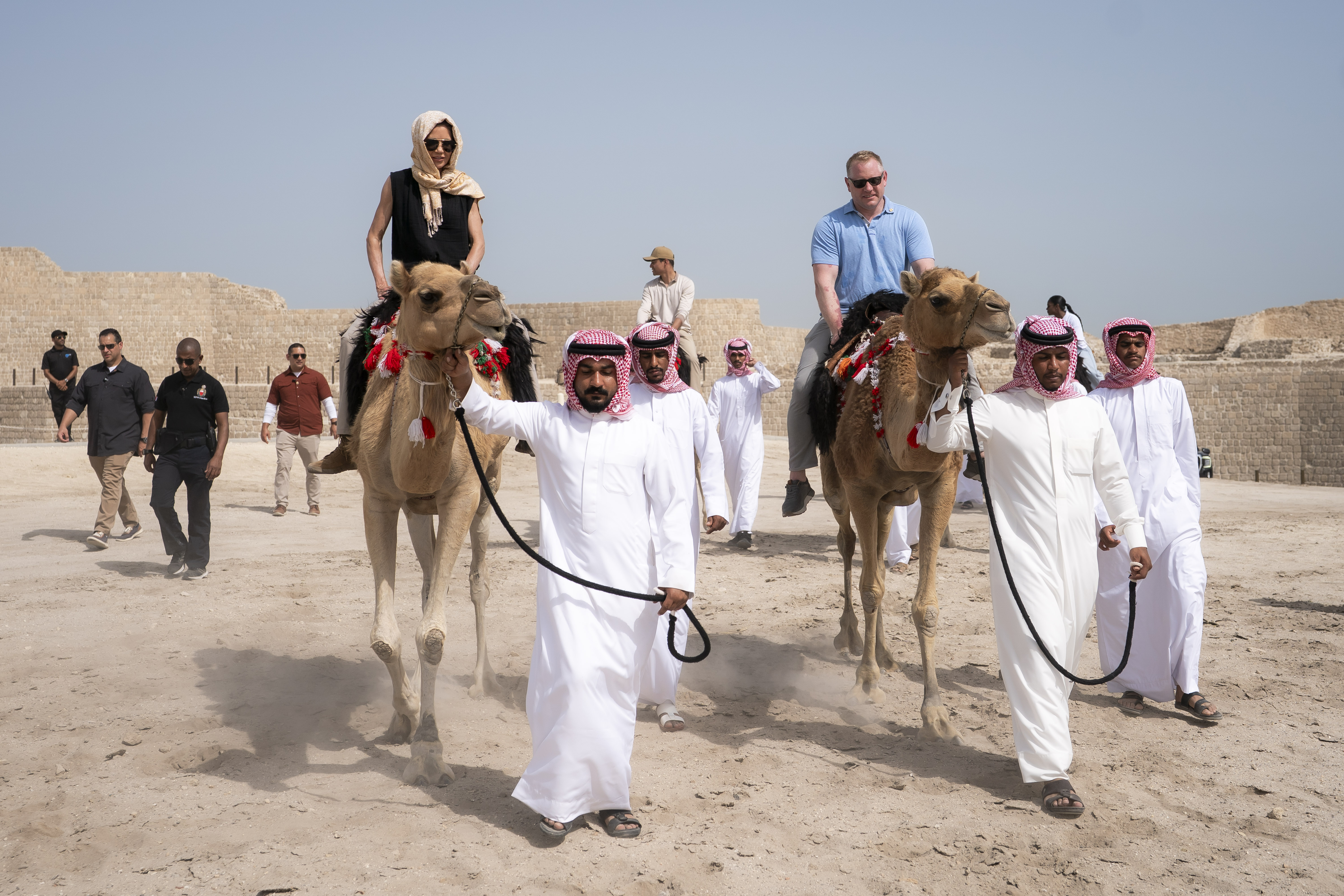
Camel riding in Karbabad, 2025

Karbabad (Arabic: كرباباد) is a village in the Kingdom of Bahrain, situated along the northern coastline bordering the Persian Gulf. The village is famously known for being close to the location of the UNESCO World Heritage Site Qal'at al-Bahrain.

The village was known for its beach, however in recent years, land reclamation has resulted in the sea shore moving some 2 km from the once sea-front village. Residents of the village have complained about land reclamation "destroying their heritage".
