= Adel Flaifel =

Bahraini State Security Services official

Colonel Adel Jassim Flaifel (or Felaifel, or Flaifil) (Arabic: عادل فليفل) is a former colonel in the State Security and Intelligence Service of Bahrain. He is accused of committing, or overseeing, acts of physical and psychological torture on Bahraini citizens from 1980s until 1997. He was released from his duties in December 2002 due to protests and pressure from human rights organizations worldwide. In March 2000, King Hamad awarded Flaifel with the Order of Shaikh Isa bin Salman Al Khalifa (Third Class).

Flaifel has never been charged with any crime. In the Royal Decree 56 of 2002, an edict issued by King Hamad ibn Isa al-Khalifah granted amnesty to human rights abuses committed by security officers prior to 2001. Torture allegations against Flaifel have been documented by international human rights organizations such as Human Rights Watch and Amnesty International. Protests were held in Bahrain in 2002 demanding prosecution of Flaifel for carrying out torture.

Flaifel has been accused of carrying out torture along with former Bahrain State Security chief Ian Henderson.

In November 2002, 8 Bahraini torture victims lodged complaints against Flaifel with Directorate of Public Prosecutions, however no charges have been taken against him by the government of Bahrain.

== Fraud and embezzlement charges ==
Flaifel managed to flee Bahrain on May 3, 2002, despite being wanted for involvement in fraud. He fled to Brisbane, Australia where he purchased 50 million Australian dollars' worth of prime Brisbane central business district buildings. It would later turn out that he was being sought after by Interpol on fraud and embezzlement charges, following a request from the Bahrain Government on May 20, 2002.

Two individuals, Omar Ali Babtain, the president and chief executive officer of the United Medical Group, which equips and manages hospitals throughout the world, and Khalid Bin Nasser Bin Abdulla Al Misnad, president of the Misnad Group, an international trading and construction company, lodged a challenge against Flaifel with the Supreme Court in Brisbane challenging his ownership of the Australian properties. The pair claimed Flaifel had sold them properties in the Middle East worth 59.5 million Australian dollars, but never transferred the contracts, and used that money to purchase the Australian properties.

When it became apparent that Flaifel was in Australia, Lord Avebury, the vice-chairman of Britain's Parliamentary Human Rights Group, said he would call on Australia to try Flaifel for his alleged torture of Bahraini political activists.

Following the fraud and embezzlement case in Australian courts, Flaifel's assets were frozen internationally and he was not allowed to leave Australia.

These counts later proved to be false under specific special investigations held by the General Directorate for State Security Investigations and the Bahrain Intelligence Agency (BIA1).

== 2010 Election campaign ==
Adel Flaifel was registered as a candidate to run for member of the Council of Representatives of Bahrain (lower house of Parliament) in the 2010 legislative elections in Bahrain from Electoral District 5 of the Muharraq Governorate. He ran on behalf of the "Islamic Row" Society.

== Death threat incident ==
On 5 December, Flaifel tweeted death threats against three activists involved in the 2011-2012 Bahraini uprising: Mohammed Al-Maskati, Nabeel Rajab, and Yousef Al-Mahafdha. The incident led the International Federation for Human Rights and the World Organisation Against Torture to issue a joint statement calling for a letter-writing campaign on the men's behalf.
