= Royal Decree 56 of 2002 =

Law of Bahrain

Royal Decree 56 of 2002 is a law issued in Bahrain by King Hamad ibn Isa al-Khalifah that grants security officers and state officials immunity from prosecution for human rights abuses committed prior to 2001.

== See also ==
- Torture in Bahrain
- State Security Law of 1974
- Human rights in Bahrain
