= Bahrain Thirteen =

Bahraini opposition

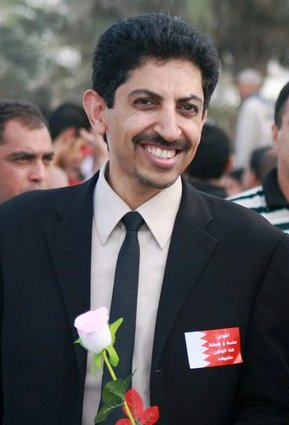
Abdulhadi al-Khawaja is widely regarded as the most prominent in the group.

The Bahrain Thirteen (Arabic: البحرين ثلاثة عشر, romanized: al-Baḥrayn Thalāthat ʻAshar) are thirteen Bahraini opposition leaders, rights activists, bloggers and Shia clerics arrested between 17 March and 9 April 2011 in connection with their role in the national uprising. In June 2011, they were tried by a special military court, the National Safety Court, and convicted of "setting up terror groups to topple the royal regime and change the constitution"; they received sentences ranging from two years to life in prison. A military appeal court upheld the sentences in September. The trial was "one of the most prominent" before the National Safety Court. A retrial in a civilian court was held in April 2012 but the accused were not released from prison. The sentences were upheld again on 4 September 2012. On 7 January 2013, the defendants lost their last chance of appeal when the Court of Cassation, Bahrain's top court upheld the sentences.

The thirteen are Abdulhadi al-Khawaja, Abdulhadi al-Mukhodher, Abduljalil al-Miqdad, Abduljalil al-Singace, Abdulla al-Mahroos, Abdulwahab Hussain, Hasan Mushaima, Ibrahim Sharif, Mohamed Habib al-Miqdad, Mohamed Hasan Jawad, Mohamed Ismail, Sa’eed al-Nuri and Salah al-Khawaja. They were originally twenty-one, but seven were tried in absentia and one was released in April 2012. The thirteen became popular heroes in Bahrain, and analysts speculated that the government was concerned that their release might re-energize the protest movement and frustrate government supporters who oppose any royal pardons.

The trial, conviction and sentencing of the Bahrain Thirteen drew expressions of concern from European Union, Denmark, France, Ireland, United Kingdom and United States, and international organizations including the United Nations, Amnesty International, Human Rights Watch, Reporters Without Borders, Committee to Protect Journalists and Human Rights First. The government of Bahrain maintained that trials were fair. The Bahrain Independent Commission of Inquiry (BICI), an independent inquiry commissioned by the King of Bahrain, concluded in November 2011 that there had been a discernible pattern of mistreatment to the defendants while in prison.

== Background ==
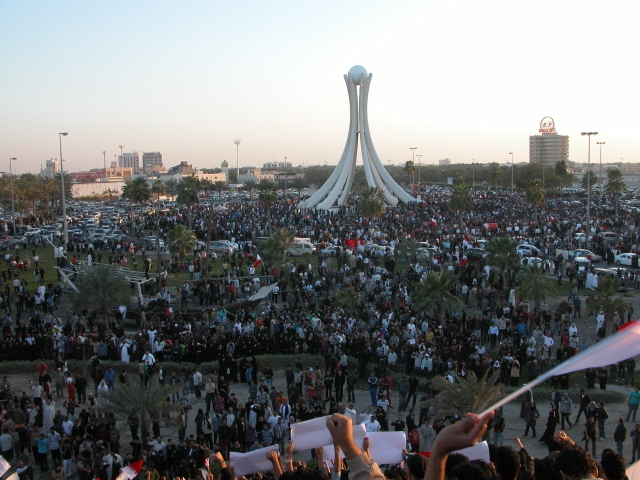
Protesters gathered at the Pearl Roundabout for the first time on 15 February.

In February 2011 the Bahraini authorities sought to repress pro-democracy protests around the Pearl Roundabout, a traffic circle near the financial district in Bahrain's capital Manama (part of the wider Arab Spring movement). On 17 February, in an attack by police that subsequently became known as Bloody Thursday; four protesters died and more than 300 were injured. Protests involving up to one fifth of the population continued over the next month until the government called in Gulf Cooperation Council troops and police and declared a three-month state of emergency. Despite the brutal crack-down that followed, smaller-scale protests and clashes continued, mostly outside Manama's business districts. By April 2012, more than 80 people had died during the uprising.

=== Naming ===
Amnesty International coined the name "Bahrain 13" to refer to the men, which was later adopted by some media sources. Their case is known locally as the Case of Icons (Arabic: قضية الرموز) and the Group of 21 (Arabic: مجموعة الـ21). They were originally twenty-one, but seven were tried in absentia and one was released in April 2012. The seven tried in absentia were either hiding or outside the country.

== Role in the Bahraini uprising ==
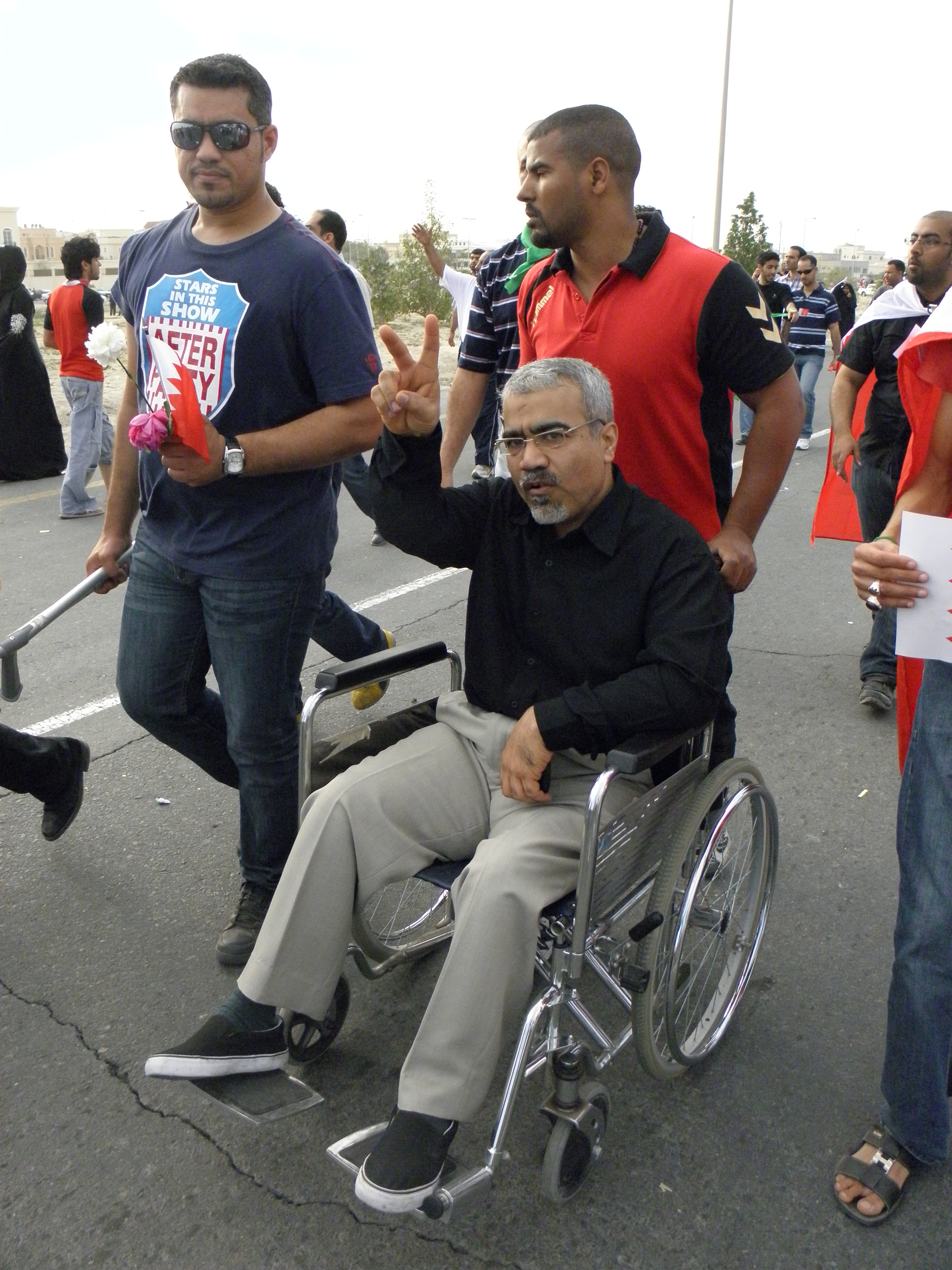
Abduljalil al-Singace on his wheel chair, taking part in a protest heading to the Royal Court in Riffa

The Bahrain Thirteen played an important role in mobilizing the public opinion against the government, organizing protests and shaping political demands. Some of the group were already in detention when the uprising began, having been arrested in the Manama incident the previous August, and were released on 22 February 2011. Abdulwahab Hussain and Hassan Mushaima, leaders of opposition parties Al Wafa' and Haq Movement respectively, were among the leaders of the 1990s uprising in Bahrain.

Mushaima was a leading member in Al Wefaq opposition group until resigning in 2005 due to their decision to run in 2006 parliamentary election. He then founded the Haq Movement. In 2010, the London-based activist was sentenced in absentia over an alleged plot to overthrow the government, however the charges were dropped in February 2011 as a part of government concessions to the opposition. This allowed Mushaima to return to Bahrain on 26 February and join the protest movement. Abduljalil al-Singace, a blogger and once the chair of University of Bahrain Engineering Department followed Mushaima's path; he resigned from his position in Al Wefaq as public relations chief and joined Haq in 2005 as the head of human rights department. He was among the arrested in August 2010 and joined the uprising when he was released on 22 February. The Haq Movement supported protest plans.

Abdulwahab Hussain was also a member of Al Wefaq who resigned in 2005. Unlike Mushaima and al-Singace, Hussain left politics in 2005. He returned in 2009 when he co-founded Al Wafa' opposition group and became its official spokesperson. He played a bigger role in the uprising; he was not arrested when the uprising began nor was he outside the country. Hussain led the first demonstration in the uprising in the early hours of 14 February. He is also credited with suggesting autonomous action and total decentralization of the protest movement which was adopted by February 14 Youth Coalition, the group behind the call for an uprising in order to avoid getting infiltrated by government.

Abduljalil al-Miqdad is a prominent Shia and political activist, and a co-founder of Al Wafa'. He resigned from the Bahrain Ulama Council in 2005. The relationship between al-Miqdad and Al Wafa' is comparable to that of Isa Qassim and Al Wefaq; its unofficial spiritual leader. Sa'eed al-Nori is a religious, political activist and vocal critic of the government, and member of Al Wafa'. He was among the arrested in August 2010. Mohamed Ismail is a political activist with close relations to Abdulwahab Hussain.

In March 2011, Haq, Al Wafa' and Bahrain Freedom Movement formed a "Coalition for a [Bahraini] Republic", calling for the downfall of the current regime by escalation of peaceful protests and the establishment of a democratic republic. While they accepted a western-style constitutional monarchy in principle, saying it was "not very different from a republic", they doubted the regime would voluntarily implement such a radical change and argued that toppling it was unavoidable. The newly found coalition supported a controversial, yet peaceful protest heading to the Royal Court in Riffa. The rally ended in chaos after it was dispersed by security forces and "pro-government Sunni vigilantes".

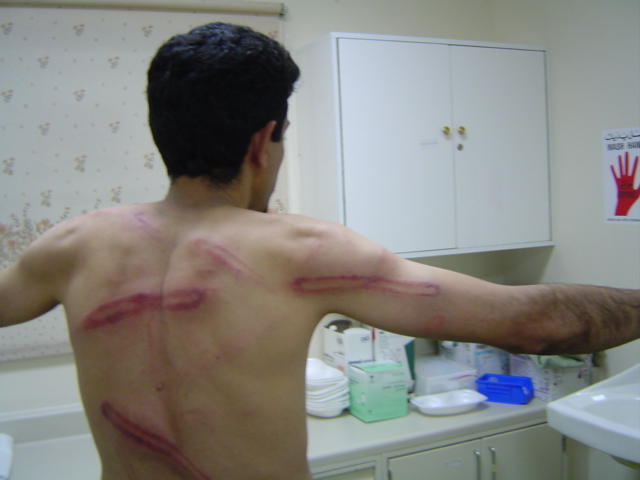
Beating marks on the back and arm of Abdulhadi al-Khawaja allegedly as a result of police attack on a protest in 2005

Abdulhadi al-Khawaja, described by the Index on Censorship as one of the best-known human rights activists in the world, is the co-founder of the Bahrain Centre for Human Rights and a vocal critic of the government. Al-Khawaja was arrested in 2004 and 2007, and reportedly beaten in 2005 over his opposition activities. He holds Danish and Bahraini dual citizenship. His role in the uprising was much less; his activities were limited to "organising peaceful awareness-raising and human rights education". He said he had intentionally kept himself away from the Pearl Roundabout in order to avoid "giv[ing] the authorities any reason to arrest" him. Salah al-Khawaja is a former member of Islamic Action Society (Amal) and brother of Abdulhadi al-Khawaja. During the uprising, he sought to document events and contact international media.

Ibrahim Sharif is an opposition leader and president of the secular, leftist, cross-sectarian National Democratic Action Society (Wa'ad). Wa'ad is allied with Al Wefaq opposition group. They organized many protests calling for an elected government and a constitutional monarchy. Sharif is the only Sunni member of Bahrain Thirteen, the rest being Shia. His Sunni identity undermines the attempts of government of Bahrain to visualize the protest movement as a sectarian and pro-Iranian plot, and shows that it has support from parts of the Sunni community. Ten days before the uprising, Sharif demanded "local reform" in a rally in solidarity with the 2011 Egyptian Revolution, however Wa'ad only announced a day before the protests that it supported "the principle of the right of the youth to demonstrate peacefully".

Mohamed Habib al-Miqdad -cousin of Abduljalil al-Miqdad- is a prominent religious and political leader, president of al-Zahraa Society for Orphans and holds Bahraini and Swedish dual citizenship. Al-Miqdad is also a vocal critic of the government. Abdulla al-Mahroos is a religious and political activist, vice president of al-Zahraa Society for Orphans and a vocal critic of the government. Abdulhadi al-Mukhodher is a Shia cleric. Mohamed Hasan Jawad is a rights activist. He is also an uncle of Nabeel Rajab, a Bahraini opposition leader, and a father of Hussain Jawad, a prominent human rights defender, arrested in February 2015. All of the four (Mohamed Habib al-Miqdad, Abdulla al-Mahroos, Abdulhadi al-Mukhodher and Mohamed Hasan Jawad) were among the arrested in August 2010.

== Arrests ==
The arrests of the Bahrain Thirteen took place between 17 March 2011 and 9 April, due to their role in the uprising. The first to be arrested were Abdulhadi al-Mukhodher, Abduljalil al-Singace, Abdulwahab Hussain, Ibrahim Sharif, Hassan Mushaima and Saeed al-Nuri, and the last was Abdulhadi al-Khawaja. Most were arrested by security forces during the night. According to the Bahrain Centre for Human Rights, no warrants were shown and many of the detainees were beaten during their arrest. They were held in al-Qurain military prison and on 28 November they were transferred to Jaw prison.

== Torture ==
Following their arrest the activists were kept in solitary confinement for weeks during which they were allegedly subjected to torture by Bahrain National Security Agency (NSA) officers seeking to secure confessions and for punishment. This reportedly included sexual assaults.

In April, a patient in the Military Hospital saw Ibrahim Sharif with his face swollen, raising concerns that he may have been tortured. According to Amnesty International, Abdulhadi al-Khawaja suffered fractures of the jaw and head and bruising of the arms during his first month in detention, allegedly as a result of torture. After a six-day hospitalization during which he underwent several operations, torture was reportedly resumed. According to Human Rights Watch (HRW) signs of mistreatment were visible on al-Khawaja's face during the first trial session in May and Hassan Mushaima and Abdulwahab Hussain were seen to have noticeable limps. Bahrain Centre for Human Rights published detailed allegations of the torture allegedly inflicted on the Bahrain Thirteen.

On 8 May 2011, the authorities declared that none of the Bahrain Thirteen had been subjected to torture, stating that information from the Military Hospital and the Salmaniya Medical Complex showed that neither hospital had admitted or treated any of the detainees. Rumours of admissions and hospitalization were said to have been fabricated and politically motivated.

The Bahrain Independent Commission of Inquiry, established by the King of Bahrain in June 2011, which found that hundreds of detainees had been subjected to torture and other forms of physical and psychological abuse, observed a discernible pattern of mistreatment with regard to 14 political leaders including the Bahrain Thirteen. According to the commission's report, torture at al-Qurain prison, where the Bahrain Thirteen were held, stopped after 10 June.

== Trial, conviction, and retrial ==
=== Military courts ===
The Bahrain Thirteen were sent for trial initially by the National Safety Court, a special military court set up in March 2011 to try protesters, opposition leaders, rights activists, health workers and other supporters or perceived supporters of the Bahraini uprising. The trial was "one of the most prominent" before the National Safety Court. The first hearing on 8 May 2011 marked the first time the fourteen defendants originally charged had seen their families since their arrest and for some it was the first time they had met with their lawyers. All fourteen denied the charges against them.

The two main charges were of "setting up terror groups to topple the royal regime and change the constitution" and of "collaborating with a foreign state", an apparent reference to Iran, and other charges included "insulting the army, inciting hatred, disseminating false information and taking part in rallies without notifying the authorities." Front Line Defenders and Human Rights First observers were denied entry to the trial, but a few Bahraini NGO observers were present. According to Human Rights Watch all of the activities with which the fourteen were charged "related to speech and peaceful assembly" and none were criminal offenses.

On 22 June, seven of the defendants were sentenced to life imprisonment, four to fifteen years in prison, two to five years and one to two years. After they protested loudly when the sentence was read, they were forcibly removed from the court. Amnesty International concluded that an appeal session on 6 September had heard no evidence to support charges. The military appeal court hearing on 28 September took a few minutes before the court upheld all the convictions. In November, the Bahrain Independent Commission of Inquiry asked for a retrial in civilian courts, because they were convicted in military courts.

On 29 January the fourteen began a one-week hunger strike which was joined, according to rights activist Mohamed al-Maskati, by another 150 prisoners. The object of the hunger strike was to demand an end to the political crackdown, protest against their trials and demand the release of prisoners of conscience. Abdulhadi al-Khawaja subsequently went on a new 110-day hunger strike. He was transferred to hospital in April as he kept reducing the amount of his glucose intake. On 30 April 2012, the Court of Cassation reduced Al-Hur Yousef al-Somaikh's sentence from two years to six months and he was released as he had already served his sentence. The court also announced that the thirteen other defendants would be retried by a (civilian) criminal court of appeal, but they were not released from prison, leading to criticism from the United Nations.

=== Civilian courts ===
The first hearing before the High Criminal Court of Appeal, due to take place on 8 May, was postponed to 22 May. Abdulhadi al-Khawaja, on the ninetieth day of his hunger strike, was brought to court in a wheelchair. All the defendants pleaded not guilty. Al-Khawaja and Abdulwahab Hussain told of being subjected to torture during the initial weeks of their detention, the former stating that he had been sexually assaulted and the latter that he had been forced to sign a written statement. On 19 June, defence lawyers asked the court to disregard confessions that the BICI report had suggested were obtained by torture but the public prosecutor insisted on their inclusion in the evidence. According to Bahrain Centre for Human Rights, these confessions were the sole evidence submitted to the court.

During the same session, cleric Mohamed Habib al-Miqdad made a long testimony in which he described alleged torture and renounced his accusation that Nasser Al Khalifa, the son of the king had tortured him in person. The thirteen asked their defense lawyers to stop representing them after the judge decided to continue hearings in secret and subsequently banned media coverage of the case, due to "national security reasons". New lawyers were appointed by court and the judge declared that the final judgment would be given even if the defendants refused to attend. The Court originally expected to give its final verdict on 14 August was attended by a number of foreign diplomats, but the session was deferred until 4 September with no specific reason given. The verdict was expected to have a significant impact on the course of the uprising and analysts suggested that the government was uncertain how to deal with the defendants who became popular heroes, given that their release was likely to give new impetus to the protest movement.

A few days prior to the expected verdict on 4 September, which was also the expected day of the verdict of 28 health workers and Zainab al-Khawaja, Human Rights First said it could be a "transformative day for human rights" in Bahrain "if the right decisions are made". On 4 September, the appeal court upheld the sentences on all of the Thirteen; who did not attend the session. Analysis said the decision was likely to fuel political tensions and street clashes, and highlight the low chances of any reconciliation in near future. Witnesses reported that protesters set tires on fire and clashed with security forces in several Shia villages following the verdict and one protester was severely injured by a stun grenade.

On 7 January, the Cassation Court, Bahrain's top court upheld the sentences. With the court decision the thirteen defendants (who did not attend the trial) had exhausted their last chance to appeal. The only avenue that remains for their release is a royal pardon.

== Reactions ==
=== International ===
==== Supranational bodies ====
EU – Catherine Ashton, the High Representative of European Union said she was "disappointed and concerned" by the sentences. "I am disappointed and concerned at the decision of the Bahraini Court of Appeal to uphold the harsh sentences against Mr Abdulhadi Khawaja and nineteen other individuals," she added.

GCC - Abdullatif Al Zayani the secretary-general of Gulf Cooperation Council supported the verdict and affirmed that judiciary of Bahrain was independent. "[C]ourt verdicts have to be respected by all," he added.

UN – Ban Ki-moon, Secretary-General of the United Nations, said he was deeply concerned by what he described as "the harsh sentences" and urged the government of Bahrain to allow all defendants to exercise their right to appeal and to act in strict accordance with its international human rights obligations, including the right to due process and a fair trial. Following 4 September verdict, he expressed his concern and asked government of Bahrain to fulfill implementation of BICI report and to engage in a meaningful dialogue that "addresses the legitimate aspirations of all Bahrainis".

Navi Pillay, the United Nations High Commissioner for Human Rights (OHCHR), expressed serious concern at the trials, which bore the marks of "political persecution". She called for an immediate end to trials of civilians in the Court of National Safety and the immediate release of all peaceful demonstrators arrested in connection with the February protest movement. Rupert Colville, spokesperson for OHCHR, also referred to the sentences as "harsh" and expressed deep concern over "serious due process irregularities". Four United Nations Special Rapporteurs demanded immediate release of Abdulhadi al-Khawaja.

==== States ====
Denmark – Villy Søvndal, Denmark's Foreign Minister said the appeal court sentence was "very disappointing" and that further international action would be taken to secure release of al-Khawaja and "the other human rights and democracy fighters in Bahrain". Jeppe Kofod, the Foreign policy spokesperson asked the Danish parliament to discuss possible sanctions on Bahrain. Eight parties in the Danish parliament appealed to king of Bahrain to release Abdulhadi al-Khawaja and his daughter, Zainab.

France - A spokesperson for the French Foreign Office said he was especially concerned by the sentence of al-Khawaja and hoped that it will be reviewed on appeal. He affirmed the right of freedom of expression and urged authorities to implement Bahrain Independent Commission of Inquiry's recommendations.

Iran - Spokesman of the Foreign Ministry criticized the verdicts saying they would only serve to "complicate the situation even further". "The only solution to the crisis in Bahrain and to restore calm and stability is to respond to the legitimate demands of the population," he added.

Ireland - Eamon Gilmore, the deputy prime minister and Minister for Foreign Affairs and Trade criticized the sentence of al-Khawaja and expressed his great concerns. "I have strongly and actively supported international efforts urging the Bahraini government to exercise clemency and to allow his release on humanitarian grounds, particularly in light of clear findings documented by the Bahraini International Commission of Inquiry as to how Mr al-Khawaja was seriously ill-treated following his initial detention," he added.

UK – The United Kingdom Foreign Office Minister Alistair Burt expressed extreme concerned about the process that surrounded the sentencing of 21 opposition members as well as the nature of many of the charges. He found it deeply worrying that civilians were being tried before tribunals chaired by a military judge, with reports of abuse in detention, lack of access to legal counsel and coerced confessions. Following 4 September sentences, the minister said he was "very disappointed" by the verdict.

United States – The United States expressed its concern at the severity of the sentences handed down to the Bahrain Thirteen. Barack Obama said keeping them in jail meant starting a real dialogue was impossible. Although avoiding direct reference to the Thirteen, the US called for the release of "those imprisoned for their political views". A State Department Deputy Spokesman, referring to President Obama's observation that such steps were at odds with the universal rights of Bahrain's citizens, noted that the cases would go through an appeals process and urged the Bahraini government to abide by its commitment to transparent judicial proceedings. Amnesty International criticized the US for its "indifference and soft approach" and urged it to demand the detainees' release instead of engaging in wishful thinking about the appeal process.

==== Non-governmental organizations ====
A number of rights groups criticized the sentences. Amnesty International designated the Thirteen prisoners of conscience and called for their immediate and unconditional release. It also called for an independent investigation of their allegations of mistreatment and urged that those responsible should be brought to justice, criticizing the Bahraini authorities for what it called a travesty of justice and said sentences were yet another proof that Bahrain was not on the path of reforms. Human Rights Watch demanded the prisoners' immediate release; according to HRW's Middle East and North Africa Deputy Director Joe Stork, the military court's original verdict was "absolutely mind-boggling", failing to mention a single actual criminal offense beyond acts relating to the defendants' basic human rights.

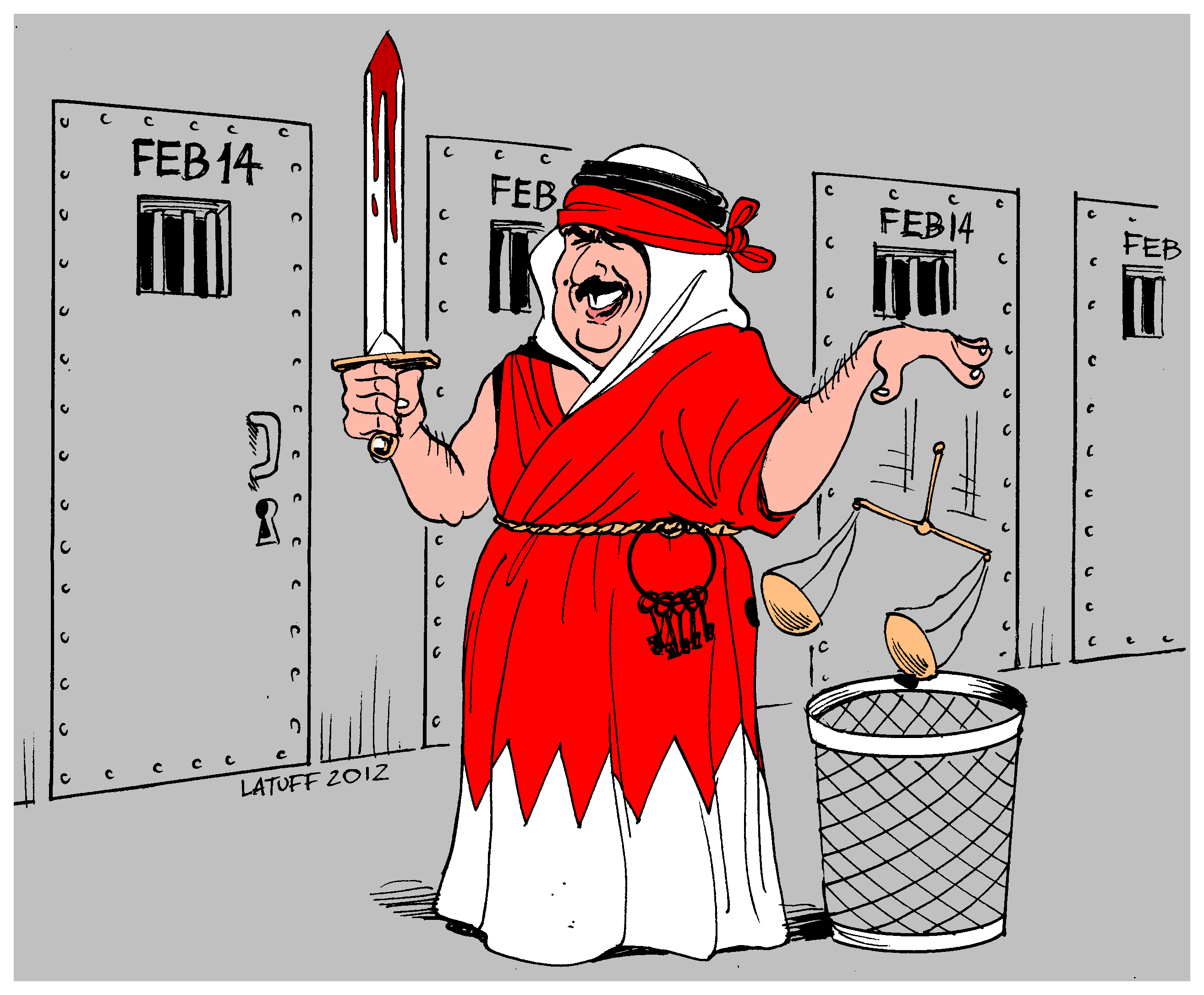
The political cartoon "Lady Justice of Bahrain" by Brazilian Carlos Latuff

Reporters Without Borders was shocked by the lengthy sentences and very worried about the physical condition of al-Singace whose release it demanded, along with that of all the other prisoners of conscience. The Committee to Protect Journalists condemned the sentences and dismissed the charges as political score-settling. The Arabic Network for Human Rights Information condemned the sentences as vindictive. The International Federation for Human Rights and the World Organization Against Torture expressed their "utmost concern" at the sentences and demanded the immediate and unconditional release of the Bahrain Thirteen. Human Rights First criticized what it called a "large political show trial" and declared that the sentences revealed the "travesty" of Bahrain's military courts. Upon reading the appeal sentence, it criticized it and said reform claims were "sham".

English PEN said it was shocked by the lengthy sentence handed down to al-Singace and demanded his release along with all of those imprisoned for peaceful expression of opinion. Jane Kinninmont of Chatham House said that the government "may be trying to show their strength ahead of a planned dialogue with political societies" and that western pressure is limited due to Saudi support. Front Line Defenders, whose al-Khawaja was its Middle East Protection Coordinator for three years condemned his sentence and demanded his immediate and unconditional release. Brazilian political cartoonist, Carlos Latuff produced a cartoon labeled "The Lady Justice of Bahrain" depicting king of Bahrain holding a blood stained sword in a hand and dropping Scales of Justice in the trash with the other.

=== Domestic ===
The government of Bahrain said that trials were fair and judiciary independent. "The court provided all assurances of a fair trial through a team of 17 defense attorneys selected by the defendants. The trial was attended by many diplomats of various nationalities ... as well as representatives of human rights and other civil society organizations," Information Affairs Authority said. Responding to the various international reactions, the Human Rights Affairs Ministry rejected "any intervention by any state or organization". Government supporters praised the sentences asking for no pardons to be given to the thirteen. Mohammed Khalid, a former MP and a hard-line cleric wrote "God is great! God is great!" on Twitter.

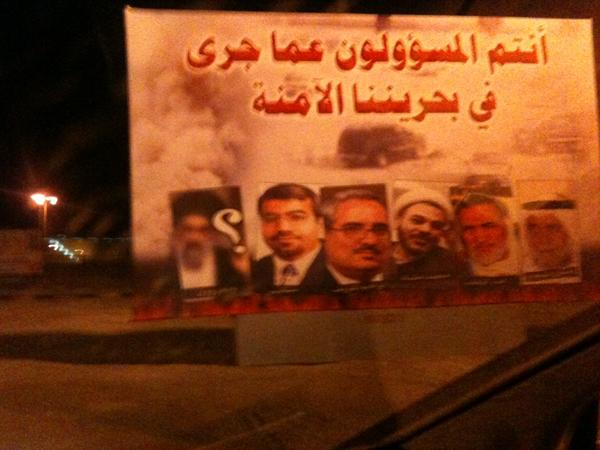
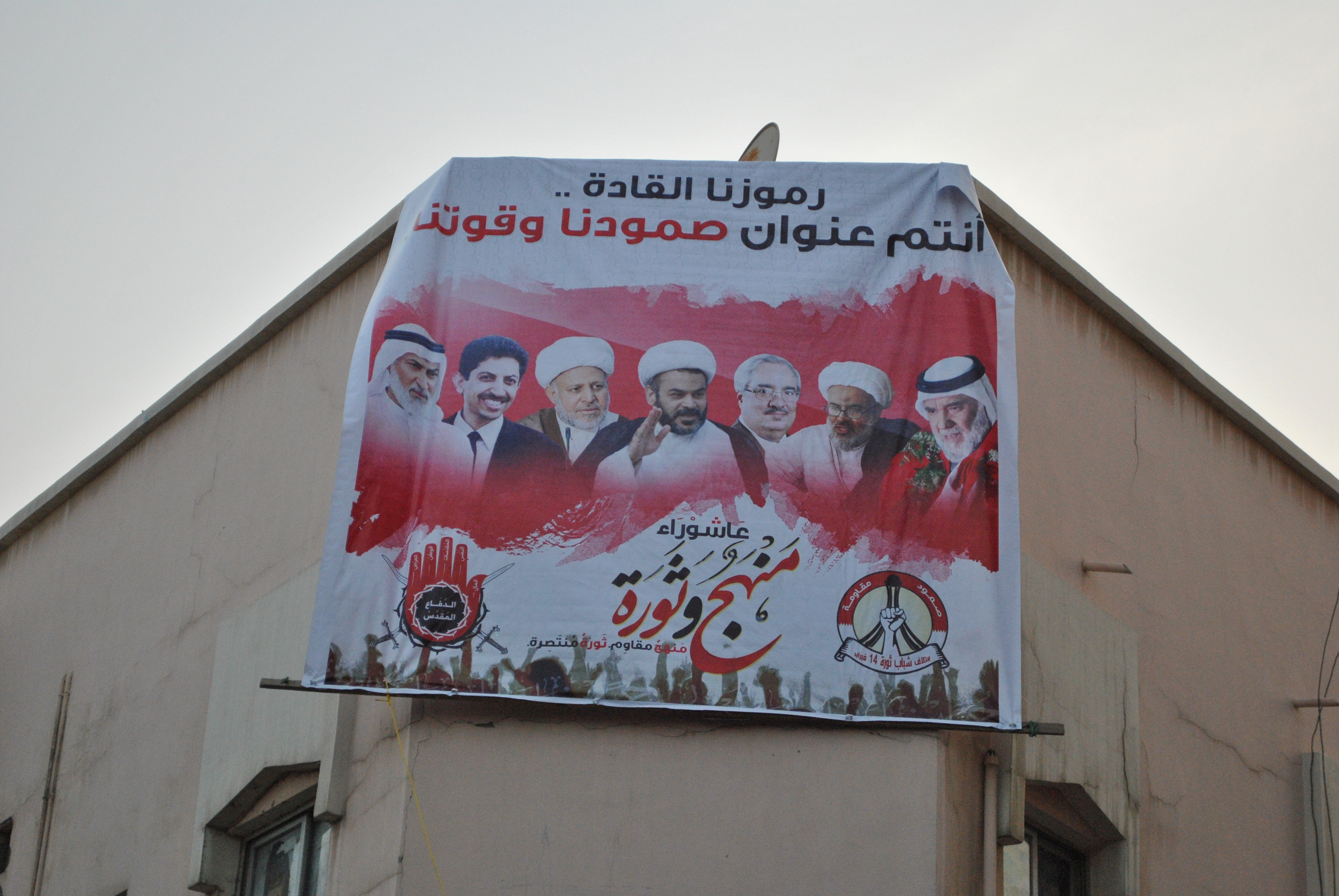
Left to right: Anti-Bahrain Thirteen sign in Muharraq and pro-Bahrain Thirteen sign in Sanabis

Many Sunnis (who comprise a substantial minority) support the government and see the Thirteen as dangerous revolutionaries that would destabilize the country should they succeed in toppling the monarchy. Government hardliners and Sunni political groups often call for harsh and no compromise approach, including calling for no pardons and death sentences. To their many supporters (in Bahrain and abroad) however, the Thirteen are heroes and prisoners of conscience jailed unfairly for nothing more than calling for democracy. Their faces appear daily in banners during protests.

The prominent human rights activist al-Khawaja family did not welcome the retrial. Maryam al-Khawaja considered it "sad news not good news", describing the court as a tool used by the regime against its people. She said she was not shocked by the civil court sentence, as there were "no international consequences and accountability for the Bahrain regime". Al-Khawaja's wife found the decision ridiculous and said that the government was "playing for time". Bahrain Centre for Human Rights maintained that the sentences were based on confessions extracted under torture and the testimony of the alleged torturers. Its head, Nabeel Rajab, criticized the military trial sentence as unfair and falling short of international standards.

Bahrain Youth Society for Human Rights expressed its concern at what it called "violations" against the Bahrain Thirteen. The Al Wefaq political party said that the sentences were hindering efforts at dialogue and damaging the country's international reputation. It rejected the appeal sentence and said they were contradictory to solving the crisis. The Bahraini Press Association described the verdict as "unfair and outrageous" and "marred by abuses and violations of all legal and human rights standards". Human rights lawyer Mohamed al-Tajer said the appeal verdict was "shocking" and that "[t]he judge dismissed the appeal". In an op-ed in Al Wasat, Kassim Hussain argued that the most remembered words about the case of Bahrain Thirteen would be Ibrahim Sharif's words: "These [political] trials are trials of ideas".

== See also ==
- Bahrain health worker trials
- Mahdi Abu Deeb
- Nabeel Rajab
