= Aftermath of the Bahraini uprising (September–December 2012) =

The following is an incomplete timeline of events that followed the Bahraini uprising of 2011 from September 2012 onward.

== Timeline ==
=== September 2012 ===
==== 4 September ====
A Bahrain court upheld jail terms against 13 leading opposition figures, including seven facing life in prison, over charges of plotting to overthrow the monarchy. Among those sentenced activist were Abdulhadi al-Khawaja who in June 2012 ended a 110-day hunger strike, Hasan Mushaima and Abduljalil al-Singace, both leaders of the banned Shia group, Haq movement, as well as Sunni leftist Ibrahim Sharif, who heads the secular Wa'ad group. The opposition swiftly condemned the "vindictive" rulings and accused the court of staging "mock trials," as the United States expressed its concern, while Amnesty International denounced the ruling as "outrageous."

==== 5 September ====
Security forces used tear gas and shotgun fire to disperse masked protesters who burned tyres and rubbish bins at the entrances of Shia villages west of Manama, and hurled petrol bombs and rocks at security forces. The main Shia opposition grouping Al Wefaq said in a statement that one protester was seriously wounded in Karrana after receiving a "direct shot in the middle of his body." Protesters chanted "Your verdicts against our revolutionary figures are unjust!" of an appeal court's decision on yesterday to uphold jail sentences against 13 leading activists, including seven facing life in prison.

==== 7 September ====
The latest demonstration was held in central Manama, an attempt by Shia-led anti-government activists to revive an uprising which started in February 2011. Protesters aimed to demonstrate against the 4 September appeals court verdict, which upheld jail sentences against 13 leading activists, including seven facing life in prison. Some carried banners reading "Freedom for the prisoners" and "We want an independent judiciary," with Sheikh Ali Salman being present. Police fired tear gas and tried to block some roads using armoured vehicles to prevent demonstrators from reaching the march.

==== 9 September ====
Police fired shotguns to disperse a "peaceful demonstration" late on Sunday in the village of Sitra, south of Manama. Al Wefaq said in a statement that Sadiq Rabie, who represents the group in the council, was hit in the back. Rabie was then led away by police from a private hospital. A picture it provided showed the right arm and shoulder of Rabie covered with bloody marks from shotgun pellets, as well as blood in his ear.

==== 10 September ====
Bahraini human rights activist Nabeel Rajab has appeared in court to appeal against a three-year jail sentence for organising illegal protests. A government official said the BBC that Rajab told the court on Monday that he had been mistreated in prison but said he had not been beaten.

==== 17 September ====
Bahrain says it has charged seven police lieutenants with alleged abuses against suspected anti-government protesters, including using torture to obtain confessions that were later thrown out in court. A government statement says two of the officers will face the most serious allegations of extracting the forced confessions. The others face lesser charges. The hearing is set for 1 October.

==== 20 September ====
An Iraqi provincial council decided to ban flights by Bahrain's carrier Gulf Air in solidarity with those facing "repression" in the tiny Sunni-ruled kingdom. The decision by Najaf provincial council came on the day that Gulf Air was resuming flights to various destinations in Shia-majority Iraq and Iran after a break of more than a year.

==== 21 September ====
Dozens of people joined the pro-democracy protest, which was called by the February 14 Youth Coalition. The clashes mark the second such violence in capital in the past month as Shia-led protesters try to rattle the Sunni monarchy by bringing rallies back into the capital Manama. Demonstrators chanted: “The people want the fall of the regime" and "Down Hamad", and demanded the resignation of Khalifa bin Salman Al Khalifa, who has served as prime minister ever since 1971. Anti-riot police responded with tear gas and stun grenades, and fired birdshot to disperse the crowd, wounding several protesters. Police has also arrested 29 people suspected of "involvement in acts of violence".

==== 26 September ====
Zainab al-Khawaja, the daughter of a jailed rights activist Abdulhadi al-Khawaja, was sentenced to two months in prison for damaging property at the police station, including tearing a picture of King Hamad bin Isa Al Khalifa. A statement from Bahrain's Information Affairs Authority said Zainab al-Khawaja would complete the sentence within a week because of time served awaiting trial.

==== 27 September ====
A Bahraini court has sentenced a policeman to 7 years in prison for killing a protester during the anti-government demonstrations. However, the court acquitted two other officers who were charged with the murder of two other protesters, Ali al-Moumin and Issa Abdel Hasan.

==== 28 September ====
Thousands of people had taken to the streets in a demonstration to demand the resignation of Prime Minister Khalifa bin Salman Al Khalifa. The protest march between the Shia-populated villages of Dia and Sahla near the capital, passed off relatively peacefully, although small groups of demonstrators skirmished with the security forces. Police killed a 17-year-old boy in a village near Bahrain's capital at night.

==== 29 September ====
The interior ministry confirmed that the male person died but defended that the police acted in self-defence from attackers using Molotov cocktails and iron rods while on patrol late Friday in Sadad, a Shia village near Manama. But the main opposition Shia group, Al Wefaq, said the 17-year-old Hussein Nemat was killed when police fired buckshot to break up a protest in the village.

Thousands of mourners took part in the funeral march, chanting anti-government slogans and waving Bahraini flags. Later, smaller groups of several hundred demonstrators broke away and hurled stones at police units. Riot police fired tear gas and stun grenades in clashes with protesters. There were no immediate reports of injuries.

==== 30 September ====
A Bahraini court reduced jail sentences for three athletes, Mohammed Mirza, his brother Ali Mirza and Mohammed Jawad, who took part in an Arab Spring-inspired uprising last year to one year from 15 years. The handball players were part of a group of 32 people accused of setting fire to a farm belonging to a member of Bahrain's royal family in a village near Manama during the protests in February 2011.

=== October 2012 ===
==== 1 October ====
Officials said Bahrain's highest court has upheld the prison sentences given to nine medics for their alleged role in last year's pro-democracy protests. Dr Ali al-Ekri was sentenced to five years and the eight others were given between a month and three years. Nine other medics had their convictions overturned in June 2012 and two are hiding. The case against the medics has drawn international condemnation and has been seen as a test of the government's commitment to reform.

==== 2 October ====
Bahraini police have arrested another five medical personnel after yesterday's court decision to reject appeals to overturn a total of 11 medical professionals were convicted for roles anti-government protests last year in the Gulf kingdom. The move is likely to bring more criticism from rights groups, which denounced the appeals court decision.

Meanwhile, a young Bahraini jailed for taking part in anti-government protests last year has died in custody after being taken to hospital for treatment of a hereditary disease. The Interior Ministry said on Twitter that Mohammed Mushaima, who was serving a prison term, was pronounced dead at a government hospital, where he was admitted on 29 August "for treatment from sickle-cell anemia." The major Bahraini opposition bloc Al Wefaq confirmed Mushaima's death, saying he "passed away in custody [Tuesday] while serving a seven-year sentence for participating in pro-democracy demonstrations."

On the same day, thousands of people had gathered for Mushaima's funeral, which passed peacefully. Clashes erupted afterwards when police stopped hundreds of people trying to march to the Pearl Roundabout, the centre of last year's uprising. Protesters threw petrol bombs and stones at riot police who were trying to disperse them with water cannons after the funeral.

==== 3 October ====
Bahraini authorities released rights activist Zainab al-Khawaja from prison after she served a two-month jail term for "destroying government property".

==== 5 October ====
Protesters have clashed with police in the Bahraini capital, Manama, after their march was stopped from proceeding towards Pearl Roundabout, the focus of the mass protests that began in February last year. Police used water cannon and tear gas to disperse hundreds of protesters on Friday after a memorial for a Shia man, Mohammed Ali Ahmed Mushaima, jailed over last year's pro-democracy uprising. The interior ministry said on Twitter that a "group of terrorists" attacked police with Molotov cocktails and blocked streets, prompting police to take "legal measures" in response.

==== 6 October ====
A local rights group said the Bahraini rights activist Nabeel Rajab has gone on hunger strike, just two days after he was briefly released from jail to attend his mother's funeral. After the funeral, Rajab was taken back into custody and barred from attending the three-day condolence gathering where friends and relatives pay their respects. BCHR said that Rajab called on mourners to "continue their struggle for rights and democracy," and argued his speech was a "peaceful expression of opinion." Authorities say Rajab was barred from attending the condolence gathering because he "committed violations" at the funeral.

==== 7 October ====
A Bahraini medic was freed for time served in jail, just five days after he was sentenced with five colleagues in connection with last year's anti-government protests in the Gulf state. Mahmud Asghar, who was sentenced to six months, was released for time served before his conviction.

==== 8 October ====
Bahraini court denied a request to release rights activist Nabeel Rajab who is serving a three-year sentence for taking part in anti-government protests. Separately, the attorney general announced in a statement on Monday that charges against a police officer accused of shooting dead a protester on 17 August have been dropped.

==== 10 October ====
The Bahraini court has sentenced 4 men to prison for destroying part of a police captain's house with a stolen crane earlier this year. A government statement said the April attack was part of repeated vandalism against the police officer's home and forced his family to move to an undisclosed location of Bahrain. The statement says one man received a two and half year sentence and three others were sentenced on Tuesday to one year in prison.

==== 12 October ====
Thousands took part in a second march along a stretch of highway outside the capital Manama, which passed without incident. The main opposition bloc Al Wefaq organised the larger march, under the slogan "Stop the shedding of our blood, we will not give up our demands". Police in Bahrain fired teargas and stun grenades to disperse hundreds of stone-throwing anti-government protesters marching in the old market area of central Manama, with 10 people were arrested.

==== 15 October ====
Bahrain summoned Iran's chargé d'affaires to protest against what it called interference in its internal affairs. The government statement said Mahdi Islami was called in over Iran's "deliberately attributing false information to Bahraini officials and promoting it in the media" and "through ties and contacts with specific groups in the Bahraini community". Al Wefaq, the main opposition group, said the meeting came after Bahrain asked Iran to "contribute in finding a breakthrough to the political crisis in the country".

==== 16 October ====
Police arrested prominent rights activist Mohammed al-Maskati, the president of the Bahrain Youth Society for Human Rights, for his participation in anti-government protests. He was taken to a Manama police station where he was questioned about his role on last week's Friday protests. Lawyers said he would be referred to the public prosecutor's office on the next day and could be charged with participating in an "illegal gathering."

==== 17 October ====
Mohammed al-Maskati, who was arrested in connection with anti-government protests, denied taking part in the demonstrations and was subsequently released.

February 14 Youth Coalition claimed that an elderly man, Haj Hassan Abdullah Ali, died on Tuesday when Bahraini security forces fired tear gas at his home in the northeastern island of Sitra.

==== 18 October ====
Bahrain authorities have detained four men on charges for defaming the Bahraini king on Twitter. The four men in their 20s were arrested on Wednesday morning after security forces confiscated their computers and other electronic equipment. The defendants, who have been detained for a week, will face "an urgent trial before the criminal court", but no date has been given.

On late night of 18 October, police clashed with demonstrators who took to the streets of Eker, answering a call by the February 14 Youth Coalition. Demonstrators marched until the early hours of next day brandishing with the red and white flag of the kingdom, chanting slogans including: "The people want to topple the regime" and "Down Hamad."

==== 19 October - Siege of Eker ====
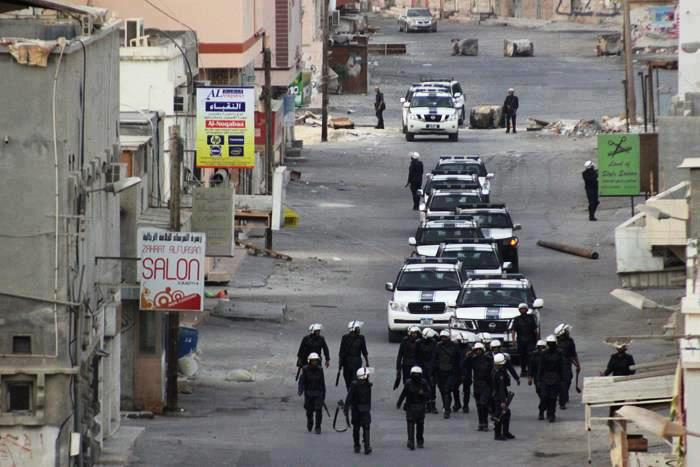
Bahraini security forces and police SUVs patrolling the besieged village of Eker, on 20 October 2012

The interior ministry on Friday said that a Bahraini policeman hurt in a roadside bombing during clashes with demonstrators overnight has died from his injuries, while another was in critical condition. The government later deployed police in SUVs and armored vehicles to Eker, and sealed off all routes leading to and from the village. Checkpoints were set up at various locations, and security forces carried out house raids, arresting at least 7 people, who the Ministry of Interior claims may have been involved in the alleged explosion. Bahraini human rights activists have stated that the raids carried out against citizens' houses are unlawful, and the arrests are arbitrary and without reasonable grounds.

Thousands of people attended the policeman's funeral in the mainly Sunni area of Riffa on Friday afternoon, with some mourners shouted "Down, down with Isa Qassim". At the same time, an anti-government demonstration attended by thousands and organised by the main Al Wefaq opposition bloc west of Manama passed off peacefully.

==== 21 October ====
Bahrain's appeals court has cut the jail terms of two teachers' union leaders, convicted of calling for the toppling of the Sunni monarchy during last year's protests. The court halved the 10-year jail sentence handed down to the head of the teachers' union, Mahdi Abu Deeb, and reduced the three-year sentence for his deputy Jalila al-Salman to 6 months. According to the statement carried by BNA state news agency, the charge of calling for the overthrow of the monarchy was dropped, but the pair's convictions for exploiting their union positions to instigate protests, calling for teachers' strikes and disrupting school were upheld.

According to the opposition Al Wefaq, clashes had broken out near Eker after some rights activists and medics tried to enter the village, which police has blocked off since Friday. Government statement said checkpoints had been set up as part of efforts to find those behind Imran Ahmed's death, the 19-year-old policeman who died during the 18 October's night bombing, "The security measures put in place in Eker in the form of checkpoints at the entrances of the area are aimed at verifying the IDs of those entering and leaving the village." The government also said seven Bahrainis have been detained over clashes.

==== 22 October ====
Authorities have fired tear gas to disperse more than 200 protesters trying to enter Eker under a security clampdown following a bombing last week that killed a policeman. An Associated Press photographer says the marchers fled when the tear gas was fired. Monday's confrontation marks the second consecutive day that demonstrators have tried to enter the village.

The Bahraini court has acquitted Sara al-Musa, a policewoman who was charged with torturing Naziha Saeed, a female journalist who works for France 24, during last year's crackdown on anti-regime protests. Media watchdog Reporters Without Borders condemned the ruling and said in a statement that it "illustrates the Bahrain's judicial system's lack of independence." The organisation also said Saeed intends to appeal the verdict.

==== 24 October ====
According to a police statement carried by Bahrain's official BNA news agency on Wednesday, police and anti-government protesters clashed in Eker Tuesday overnight leaving at least two people wounded. The statement claimed that protesters attacked police with Molotov cocktails and iron rods on Tuesday night, with at least "two suspects" were injured. The police said they were searching for "other suspects who participated in the attack." Witnesses meanwhile said police used tear gas and birdshot to disperse demonstrators who had gathered in Bani Jamra, just outside the capital, to protest a government siege of the Eker.

==== 26 October ====
On Friday, the director of northern police said that a Bahraini policeman who suffered severe burns in an attack in April has died. According to the statement, the officer had been sent abroad to receive treatment for his burns, but succumbed to his injuries on Thursday. He added that the officer was burned in a "terrorist attack" in Karzakan, but without giving any further details. He is the second Bahraini policeman to die in the past week.

Dozens of protesters hit the streets in 19 different areas including the capital Manama, demanding social justice, swift transition to democracy and real political representation in the government. Government forces reportedly attacked a peaceful protest in Manama, and arrested a father of the late child of Ali Jawad Al-Shaikh among other protesters. At the same time, people marched in Sitra to demand the immediate release of Jawad al-Shaikh.

==== 29 October ====
Bahrain's prosecutor appealed against the acquittals of a policewoman accused of torturing a journalist and two policemen tried for murdering demonstrators in last year's anti-regime protests.

==== 30 October ====
The government of Bahrain banned all public rallies and demonstrations, a move that drew swift condemnation from human rights groups and opposition activists who said it was intended solely to stifle criticism of the ruling monarchy. In a statement, Bahrain's interior minister said protests were banned after "repeated violations" by rally organizers, including riots, attacks on property and calls for the overthrow of "leading national figures" and that legal action would be taken against "anyone attempting to organize a rally". The government spokesman said in an interview that the ban would be temporary and was intended to "calm things down" after the recent deaths of protesters and police officers. The move seemed likely to inflame the already dangerous standoff involving a protest movement that has been unable to wrest freedoms from a government that opposition activists say is methodically blocking all avenues for dissent.

==== 31 October ====
Bahrain has come under fire from many international rights group, which Amnesty International said the measure nullified the rights to freedom of association, expression and assembly. Britain has expressed concern over the ban but also called on demonstrators to "desist from violent protest". While United States voiced concern at Bahrain's ban on all protests and public gatherings, urging the Gulf state to find a way to allow peaceful demonstrations to resume. However, Bahrain defended its decision to impose a ban on all public protests, saying it's because "increasing violence has resulted in death and serious injury to many."

=== November 2012 ===
==== 1 November ====
United Nations Secretary-General Ban Ki-moon expressed concern over restrictions Bahraini authorities have imposed on public demonstrations and other public gatherings. He also called on protesters to “ensure that any demonstrations are, in fact, peaceful,”, noting that “recent violence that reportedly killed two police officers is unacceptable.” He also warned that Bahrain's move to ban protests could "aggravate" tensions in the Gulf state.

A civil court has sentenced an online activist to six months in prison on charges of insulting King Hamad in Twitter posts. The activist, whose name was not released, was among four people arrested last month for allegedly defaming Bahrain's monarch in cases that mirror other social media crackdowns by Gulf Arab rulers. Court rulings on the three other Twitter activists are expected next week.

==== 2 November ====
Formula One chief Bernie Ecclestone said he's not worried about Bahrain once again hosting a Formula One race despite ongoing clashes between security forces and anti-government protesters. The race was added to the 2013 calendar despite sometimes daily violent protests for greater political rights.

==== 3 November ====
Bahrain authorities ordered the detention for seven days of a senior activist Yousif al-Mahafdha, accusing him of taking part in a banned demonstration.

Opposition activists claimed that a 43-year-old woman, Assia Hassan al-Madeh, has died after inhaling toxic tear gas in the town of Jidhafs.

==== 5 November ====
The interior ministry says that five bombs exploded in the heart of the Bahraini capital Manama on Monday, killing an Indian Thirunavukarasu Murugaiyan, 29, and 33-year-old Bangladeshi Shajib Mian Shukur Mian. The statement said the bombs were homemade and described the blasts as "terrorist acts", its term for violence by opposition activists. The explosions took place between 4:30 and 9:30 a.m. in the Gudaibiya and Adliya districts of Manama. It described the explosives as "locally made bombs" and said another Indian cleaner, Dhana Ram Sainin, had been wounded. One of the attacks took place outside a cinema, where Murugaiyan died when he kicked a package that blew up. A witness said that blast caused little material damage, suggesting it had not been large.

The bombings has triggered many response and condemnations from some countries and officials. United States condemned the attack and called for all sides to enter into a dialogue without pre-conditions to resolve the tension. Amnesty International called for an independent investigation into the attacks. Opposition politician Matar Matar from the Al Wefaq said he doubted that opposition activists were behind Monday's attacks, noting that leading Shia clerics had called on followers to avoid escalating the conflict with the government. He suggested the police or military might have been responsible, or a rogue unit, "This incident is strange - why would anyone target workers?" he said. "I'm worried that police and military are losing control of their units or it is (preparation) before declaring martial law." Maryam al-Khawaja, acting head of the Bahrain Centre for Human Rights, said "As always, we condemn violence but, given the Bahraini authorities' background in spreading disinformation, we call for an independent investigation into the deaths of the two migrant workers.", but said the attacks were "not grounds to start a campaign of collective punishment, arbitrary arrests, and torture, as we've see happen before".

==== 6 November ====
Authorities said it had arrested four suspects in the bombings that killed two people in the capital Manama and accused the Lebanese militant group Hezbollah of being behind the attacks. Bahrain News Agency quoted Information Minister Samira Ibrahim bin Rajab as saying the bombings were "staged by terrorist groups trained outside Bahrain and based in countries including Lebanon". She said the groups were operating under principles set by Iranian Supreme Leader Ayatollah Ali Khamenei and that 19 pro-Iran satellite media channels were inciting their supporters in Bahrain to subvert the government.

==== 7 November ====
The government has revoked the citizenship of 31 opposition activists for "undermining state security", including Jawad and Jalal Fairuz, former MPs for the leading Shia movement, Al Wefaq, and Ali Mushaima, son of Haq Movement's imprisoned leader Hasan Mushaima. Matar Matar, a former MP and leading member of Al Wefaq, told the AFP news agency that many of the activists whose citizenship was revoked on Wednesday had been acquitted by a military court last year after being charged with harming state security. The list also includes Said al-Shihabi, head of the Bahrain Freedom Movement, and three Shia clerics - Hussein Mirza, Khaled Mansour Sanad and Alawi Sharaf. Opposition sources said others named were currently living abroad. The Bahrain Youth Society for Human Rights (BYSHR) and the Bahrain Centre for Human Rights (BCHR) expressed their "grave concern", saying in a joint statement that the authorities had not provided any evidence. However, the interior ministry said it would implement the decision "in conformity with the kingdom's commitments under international law" and that those affected would have the right of appeal.

==== 9 November ====
Police fired tear gas and blocked roads to stop thousands of Shia Muslims joining prayers led by one of their spiritual leaders. Shia leaders had called for people to turn out to support Sheikh Isa Qassim in his village of Diraz, after the government warned clerics not to criticize the government or incite violence. Footage posted on YouTube that could not be independently verified showed a tear gas canister going off inside a car carrying women who activists said were on their way to the prayers. One woman was seen collapsing on the ground after escaping from the vehicle. Riot police prevented media and non-residents from reaching Diraz on Friday morning, blocking off all roads and highways, with some arrests were made. Al Wefaq said on Twitter that a 16-year-old, Ali Abbas Radhi, had died after he was knocked down by a car while being chased by Bahraini police during a crackdown on protesters. The interior ministry, for its part, said in a statement that the teen was killed in a traffic accident on Khalifa bin Salman highway.

==== 10 November ====
Heavy clashes erupted after the funeral of a teenager killed in a traffic incident during a clampdown on marchers the day before. According to the opposition Al Wefaq spokesman Hadi al-Musawi, he says the kingdom's paramilitary National Guard were seen setting up in Sitra deploying to back up police as authorities try to quell rising political violence. Previously, Guard forces have been used mainly at key sites in the capital Manama, including the landmark square Pearl Roundabout that was the center of the protests in their first weeks. A government statement said the Guard will be patrolling “strategic locations” that have been scenes of arson attacks and clashes.

==== 11 November ====
The court sentenced 19 activists to five years each in jail for the "attempted murder of policemen" during unrest which swept the Gulf state in 2011. They were found guilty of "setting an ambush for police and attacking them with Molotov cocktails" during demonstrations late December 2011 in the village of Nuwaidrat. Nine other defendants were acquitted.

Clashes erupted again on the second day after the funeral of a teenage boy killed on Friday was held.

The head of Bahrain's main opposition Al Wefaq group Ali Salman says envoys from the US and other countries are acting as intermediaries with the Gulf nation's rulers in attempts to ease the unrest, however the protest groups see little hope for breakthrough dialogue as crackdowns widen.

==== 13 November ====
Dozens of anti-government protesters took to the streets of Ma'ameer on Tuesday evening to commemorate the victims of the regime. The protesters held candles and pictures of the victims including 16-year-old Ali Abbas Radhi, whom activists say was killed on 9 November when he was hit by a car as he was being chased by Bahraini police forces.

==== 17 November ====
A breakaway federation says it has attracted thousands of members since launching in July 2012. The organisation, Bahrain Labour Union Free Federation (BLUFF), says its rival is "too political and no longer focuses on labour issues". Its vice-president Basim Kuwaitan told the BBC that unions from 12 companies had joined his organisation and estimated the number of members as "between 13,000 and 15,000". He says the reason for the creation of a new federation was the existing General Federation of Workers Trade Unions in Bahrain (GFBTU), he claims, was "not labour related anymore". Unions representing workers at many major corporations in Bahrain, several of them with ties to the ruling family, the Al Khalifa, have gone over to BLUFF.

==== 18 November ====
Authorities rejected requests by several groups to organise a pro-Gaza march, after a protest ban announced last month, but instead allowed sit-ins in office buildings.

==== 19 November ====
The interior ministry said its own investigation had found that a group of policemen had physically attacked one man, Hassan Mohammed Abdullah, who was trying to attend the meeting in Bani Jamra. It said the ministry referred the case to the public prosecutor and the police officers will have a court hearing on 21 November.

==== 21 November ====
Amnesty International has condemned what it says is the failure of the government of Bahrain to deliver on its promise of reform.

==== 23 November ====
The United States said it was concerned about rising violence in Bahrain, and urged the government to exercise "restraint" in responding to protests.

United Nations Human Rights Commissioner Navi Pillay is sending a team of experts to Bahrain next week to discuss how the Gulf state can improve its rights record amid concerns over Manama's decision to revoke the nationality of 31 people and ban public protests. They will focus on the judicial system as well as on accountability for present and past human rights violations and follow up on a preliminary mission that took place in December 2011.

==== 26 November ====
At least 400 people marched from Diya village near Manama towards the site of Pearl Roundabout in the capital after the Ashura services held to mark the anniversary of the death of Prophet Muhammad's grandson, Imam Hussein. Consequently, clashes erupted when demonstrators numbering in the thousands, according to opposition activities and a news website, neared the roundabout and were confronted by security forces. At least one protester was arrested and security forces used tear gas, stun grenades and birdshot to rout the crowd. Dozens were overcome by tear gas. The Interior Ministry said it confronted a group of "troublemakers" who used firebombs and used stones and wooden barricades to block a main street there.

==== 30 November ====
Amnesty International urged Bahrain to release 13 jailed opposition activists, saying doing so would prove the Gulf monarchy is "genuinely committed" to reform and respecting human rights.

=== December 2012 ===
==== 1 December ====
Protesters took to the streets in response to a call by the February 14 Youth Coalition for rallies against a blockage imposed on the Shia village locality of Mahazza since 7 November. The protesters, some of whom wore masks, waved the Bahraini flag and pictures of prisoners, chanted "The blockade will not make us afraid" and "Down with Hamad". Police responded by firing tear gas, sound bombs and buck shot, injuring some of the protesters.

==== 3 December ====
The Court of Cassation has set a date to announce its verdict in the trial of 13 opposition leaders on 7 January 2013. The court also rejected a request by the foreign diplomats and a UN human rights representative to release them on bail pending the verdict.

==== 7 December ====
Thousands of demonstrators march in a village near the Bahraini capital to demand the Prime Minister's ouster. The gathering was the first to be officially allowed since the end of October 2012, when the authorities banned all protests to ensure "security is maintained."

The crown prince of Bahrain says top Shia religious leaders must forcefully denounce violence as a key step to ease the uprising.

==== 10 December ====
Senior US envoy Michael Posner urged authorities to prosecute those responsible for widespread crackdowns against the anti-government uprising. He has also urged Bahrain's leadership to drop charges against activists involved in “non-violent political expression” and voiced concern about recent measures, including revoking citizenship for 31 activists.

Authorities sentenced the Zainab al-Khawaja to one month in jail for taking part in an unauthorised demonstration, claiming she was found guilty of entering the "prohibited area" of Pearl Square on 12 February 2012. However, her lawyers disputed the charges, saying there was "no formal decision declaring that Pearl Square is a forbidden area".

==== 11 December ====
Bahrain's appeals court has reduced the prison sentence handed to prominent human rights activist Nabeel Rajab from three years to two. He had been cleared of a charge of insulting police, however the court upheld Rajab's conviction of encouraging "illegal gatherings". Joe Stork of Human Rights Watch called the decision "bizarre", claiming the Bahraini judiciary is extremely politicised.

==== 14 December ====
Thousands of opposition supporters demonstrated peacefully on Friday near Manama, carrying the national flag marched along a road linking several villages, chanting slogans against the regime and urging reforms.

==== 16 December ====
Shortly after King Hamad's annual address calling for unity in a speech for the kingdom's National Day, sporadic clashes has taken place at many villages nearby the capital Manama. Elsewhere, masked youths blocked roads with burning tires, while protest groups are calling for large-scale marches later the following week.

==== 18 December ====
Authorities has extended by seven days the detention of Yousef al-Muhafedha who was arrested on charges of spreading false news on Twitter.
