= Abdulwahab Hussain =

Bahraini political activist, writer and philosopher (born 1954)

- عبد الوهاب حسين
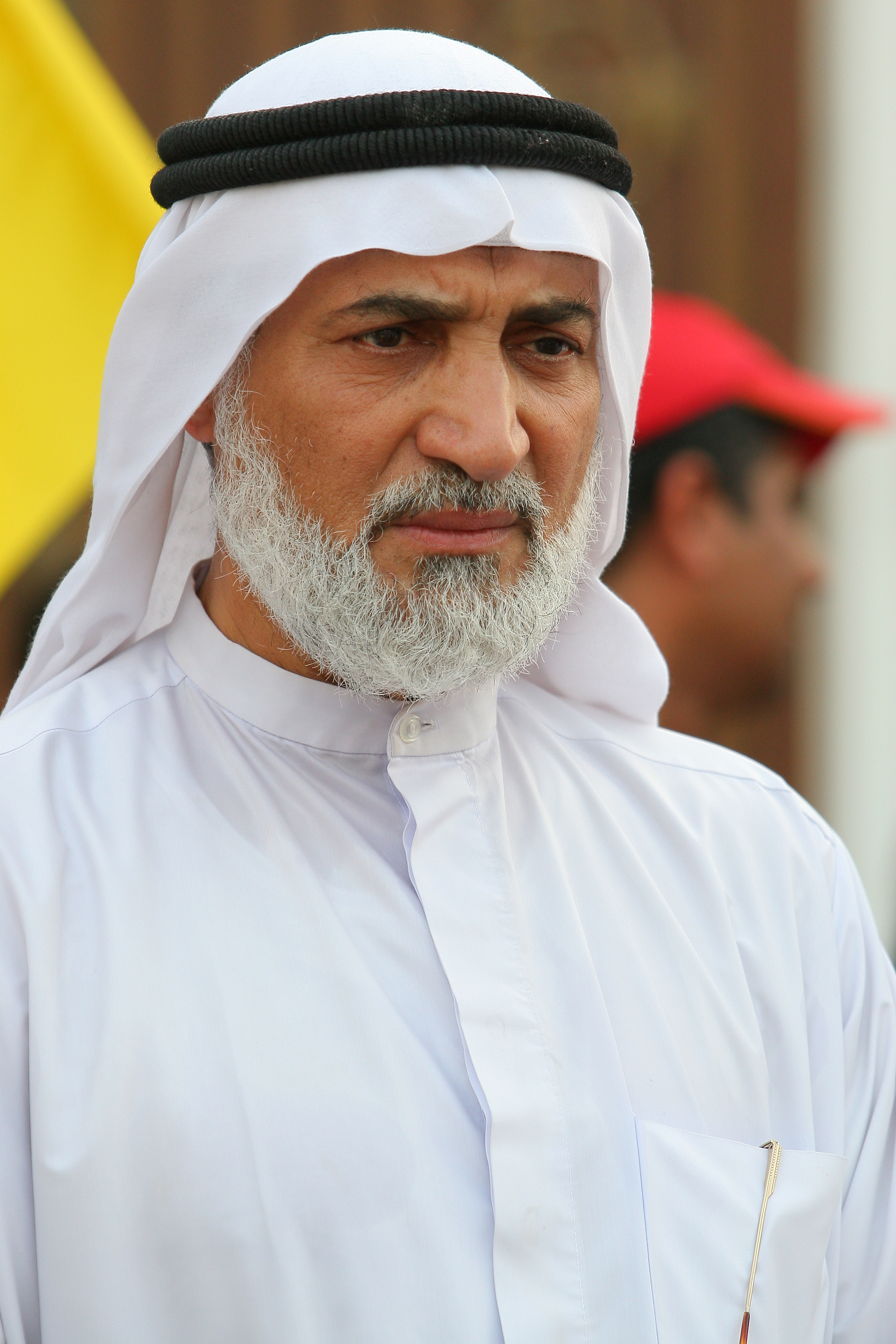
- Poster, with the Bahrain Thirteen
- Born: October 9, 1954 (age 72); Bahrain
- Education: Bachelor's degree in Philosophy and Sociology from Kuwait University
- Occupation: Political activist
- Years active: 1992–present
- Movement: Al Wafa' Islamic Movement
- Opponent: Government of Bahrain
- Spouse: Wedad Abdulraheem Salman Abdul-latif al-Bana
- Children: Aqeela (1982), Hawra (1986), Hussain (1988), Amna (1991) and Ahmed (1994)
- Relatives: Ebrahim Husain(Brother)
- Website: http://www.alostad.net

Abdulwahab Hussain Ali Ahmed Esmael (Arabic: عبدالوهاب حسين علي أحمد إسماعيل, romanized: ʻAbd-al-Wahhāb Ḥusayn ʻAlī Aḥmad Ismāʻīl; born October 9, 1954) is a Bahraini political activist, writer, religious figure and philosopher. He was one of the most prominent opposition leaders in the 1990s uprising when he was arrested twice for a total length of five years in which he was allegedly subjected to solitary confinement and torture. After his release in 2001, he supported government reform plans.

In 2001, Hussain chaired the committee which founded the now dissolved Al Wefaq, Bahrain's main opposition party. He urged opposition leaders to boycott the 2002 parliamentary election after the king issued Constitution of 2002, which he found going back on reform plans. In 2003, Hussain announced he would leave politics and stop issuing public statements and in 2005 he resigned from Al Wefaq. In 2009 he returned to politics becoming the co-founder and official spokesman of Al Wafa' Islamic Movement.

During the Bahraini uprising (2011–present), Hussain played an important role, leading protests, calling for the downfall of regime and establishment of a democratic republic. One month after the beginning of protests, he was arrested, allegedly tortured and sentenced by a special military court to life imprisonment. Later, sentence was overturned, and it was announced that he would be retried by a civilian court. The retrial began on 22 May 2012, but was postponed until May 29.

== Biography ==
Hussain was born to a poor family in the village of Nuwaidrat south of Manama. He studied in Ma'ameer primary school and upon his graduation when he was twelve, his father died. Hussain continued his study at Sitra intermediate school (then Isa Town secondary school). In 1977, he graduated from Kuwait University with a bachelor's degree in philosophy and sociology.

Upon graduation, he worked as a teacher for three years, then as a social supervisor for fifteen years before being forced to retire as a result of his activities during 1990s uprising in Bahrain. Thirteen years later, Hussain resumed his previous job for three years, before being terminated in 2008.

== Role during the 1990s uprising ==
Between December 1994 and February 2001, Bahrain saw a large number of protests and political unrest when leftists, liberals and Islamists joined forces to demand democratic reforms.

Hussain was one of the most prominent opposition leaders in the uprising. "Although the late Shaikh Abdul Amir al-Jamri was the religious leader of the Shia oppositionists at the time, Hussain's admirers claim he was the thinker behind the unrest", a leaked diplomatic cable said. He was a subscriber of the petition calling for resurrection of parliamentary life in 1992, a member of the "Petition Committee" in 1994, and of the "Initiative" in 1995. Instead of going into exile like many other activists, Hussain remained in Bahrain. He was arrested twice under the State Security Law, which allowed the government to arrest individuals without trial for a period of up to three years of administrative detention for crimes relating to state security.

=== First arrest ===
Hussain was detained for about six months between 17 March 1995 and 10 September. He and other members of the "Initiative" were released after reaching a deal with the government in which the Initiative members would calm people in exchange for the government's releasing all of those not convicted in courts. The government reportedly also agreed that at a later stage after establishment of security, the government would start a political dialogue with opposition. However, the government denied such an agreement existed, which led to worsening the situation again.

=== Second arrest ===
Hussain was arrested for the second time in January 1996 along with 7 other opposition leaders including Abdul Amir al-Jamri and Hasan Mushaima. They were held in Al-Qalaa prison. This time Hussain spent about five years in prison in solitary confinement and was allegedly mistreated. According to the Bahrain Human Rights Organisation, Hussain was pressured early in 2000 by three State Security and Intelligence Service personnel—Adel Flaifel and two "British officers"—to sign a pre-prepared paper apologizing to the Emir for his actions and promising "not to carry out acts calling for political reform, or incite others to do so, and not to partake in any public speaking, including religious sermons" in exchange for getting pardoned by the Emir. Hussain refused to sign.

On 14 March 2000, the High Court of Appeal issued an order to release Hussain. He was released three days later, but was re-arrested from his house only one hour after his return. According to the family, police promised that he would again be released after two days, after they completed arrangements for the release. Later, the family was told that Hussain would spend another three years in prison under the State Security Law.

=== Release ===
Despite getting a release verdict from the Court of Cessation on 17 November 2000, Hussain was kept in detention until 5 February 2001, when the new Emir brought several political reforms to the country. Opposition activists made intensive contacts and discussions to decide upon accepting or refusing the National Action Charter of Bahrain proposed by the Emir.

The Charter called for "a constitutional monarchy, an independent judiciary and a bicameral legislature made-up of a lower house of elected representatives and an upper house of appointed legislators. The charter also gave equal rights to men and women, with all citizens having equal political rights and being entitled to elections and candidacy according to the law".

On 8 February, only three days after his release, Hussain and three other prominent political leaders—Abdul Amir al-Jamri, Abdulla Al-Guraifi and Ali Rabea—met with the Emir. As a result, the opposition accepted the Emir's initiative. Hussain "worked hard" to convince people (specially Shia) to accept the National charter, which later gained 98.4% "Yes" votes.

== Political activities in 2000s ==
Hussain was a founding member of Al Wefaq, Bahrain's main opposition party, established on 9 July 2001. He chaired the "Preparatory Committee" between 25 September and 11 November then moved to work on other areas. When the Emir (who now became a king) officially declared the Constitution of 2002, opposition considered it going back on his public promise of 2001. Hussain urged many opposition leaders to boycott the parliamentary elections, calling the participation "unethical action".

Hussain led the Islamic Enlightenment institution in 2002, before resigning in March 2003 and announcing that he would refrain from issuing public statements and leading Friday sermons in August. As a result, a number of his admirers gathered in a two-day sit in front of his house to dissuade him from his decision. Isa Qassim, Bahrain's top Shia cleric, visited him twice for the same purpose. However, Hussain kept his position, thanking all of those who stood by him. He said his decision was not due to a personal interest and that the "issue is larger than using courtesy with it". In 2005, Hussain officially resigned from Al Wefaq after the society decided to register under the "political societies law" and participate in the elections.

=== Return to politics ===
On 6 February 2009, Hussain and Abduljalil al-Miqdad, a senior Shia cleric, announced the establishment of a new opposition group: Al Wafa' Islamic Movement. They immediately began a ten-day hunger strike demanding the release of Haq Movement leaders Hassan Mushaima and Mohammed Habib al-Miqdad. According to a leaked cable, the hunger strike attracted support from a wide range of opposition and human rights spectrum including Abduljalil al-Singace of Haq Movement, a "few members" of Al Wefaq and Abdulhadi al-Khawaja of Front Line Defenders. According to the cable, the hunger strike "achieved little", but "announce[d] the return of Abdulwahab Hussein to the opposition scene".

Starting from 6 March, Hussain, who became the official spokesman of the newly formed movement, visited a number of Shia villages holding open seminars to explain its goals and means of action. The seminars were described by many observers to be similar to those held during the 1990s by opposition leaders. Aiming to get legitimacy and support, Hussain and al-Miqdad met with Isa Qassim; however, a leaked cable reported that the latter "was not impressed".

Despite remaining small, Al Wafa' is a noted discussion topic among Bahraini politicians. It was described by a cable as having "the potential to appeal to more pious Shia" due to the "stature and credibility" of Hussain as a "conservative leader" and having the "Religious Cover" of Abduljalil al-Miqdad, which is a "must" in order to gain "popular support in the Shia community".

== Role during the Bahraini uprising (2011–present) ==
Beginning in February 2011, Bahrain saw sustained pro-democracy protests, centered at Pearl Roundabout in the capital of Manama, as part of the wider Arab Spring. Authorities responded with a night raid on 17 February (later referred to by protesters as Bloody Thursday), which left four protesters dead and more than 300 injured.

Hussain played a leading role in first days of the Bahraini uprising. He led a protest in the early morning of 14 February 2011 in his village Nuwaidrat, which police attacked. On 8 March, Al Wafa, Haq Movement and Bahrain Freedom Movement formed a "Coalition for a [Bahraini] Republic", calling for the downfall of the current regime by escalation of peaceful protests and the establishment of a democratic republic. While they accepted a western-style constitutional monarchy in principle, saying it was "not very different from a republic", they doubted the regime would voluntarily implement such a radical change and argued that toppling it was unavoidable.

=== Arrest ===
Hussain was arrested in the early hours of 17 March 2011 along with other protest leaders. He later described the arrest by saying: "While arresting me, I got beaten, kicked and had my head hit by the wall and started bleeding. My daughter Aqeela (20 years old) was also beaten by the rifle butt." Hussain also reported that security forces stole money and electronic devices from his house during the arrest and continued to beat him while being transported to prison. In prison, he was interrogated by National Security Agency and was reportedly tortured with "water, spitting in the mouth, kissing the shoes of torturers under threat of beatings". He was kept in solitary confinement for weeks.

=== Political opinion from inside prison ===
In November, Hussain said he and other activists read and studied Manama Paper, a document issued by five opposition parties listing a number of demands. However, he said, "we do not have a trend so far to issue an opinion on the document". He also emphasized on "sticking to the peaceful approach and not to be drawn to violence" and "avoiding collision with other views", his son reported.

=== Trial ===
The first hearing for Hussain and twenty other activists (seven of whom were absent) was on 8 May. They were brought before a special military court called the National Safety Court, where they were able to see their families for the first time since their arrest. Bahrain Centre for Human Rights reported that lawyers were notified less than twelve hours before the trial. Their case was referred to by Bahrain News Agency as the "terrorist organization". The defendants were faced with twelve different charges including "[o]rganising and managing a terrorist group for the overthrow and the change of the country's constitution and the royal rule". The National Safety Lower Court adjourned the hearing to 12 May, when the activists denied all charges against them and some international human rights organisations said they were not allowed to enter court. It was again postponed to 16 May.

On the fourth hearing on 22 May, Lieutenant Isa Sultan, who was brought as a witness, said the activists were following Iranian and Hezbollah orders and that they received financial aid from them to "buy gas and car tires for the youth to burn on the streets".

On 22 June, Hussain and seven other activists—Abdulhadi al-Khawaja, Abduljalil al-Miqdad, Abduljalil al-Singace, Hassan Mushaima, Mohammed Habib al-Miqdad, Saeed al-Nouri and Saeed al-Shehabi—were sentenced to life imprisonment after the court found them guilty of "plotting a coup against the government" and "having links to a terrorist organization abroad" - a clear reference to allegations that "Iranian-backed Hezbollah" was responsible for the uprising. The other thirteen activists were given sentences between two and fifteen years. According to relatives, activist raised their fists in the air and shouted "peacefully" when their sentences were issued. Hussain said to the judge "I don't recognize you, your court or who employed you", witnesses reported. As a result, they were taken out the courtroom by force. According to witnesses, security officers in the courtroom exchanged congratulations publicly. Their appeal hearing on 29 June was postponed to 6 September.

On 24 September, Hussain and other jailed opposition leaders started a hunger strike demanding the release of more than forty women arrested, reportedly humiliated and beaten one day earlier after protesting inside a shopping mall. As a result, the prison administration reportedly punished Hussain and the others by denying them health care, reportedly leading to deterioration of Hussain and Abduljalil al-Singace health conditions. Hussain denied news spread by one of Bahrain Independent Commission of Inquiry employees that they were getting good health care and said he and the other activists had called off their hunger strike on 4 October due to "complete medical negligence by prison administration", his son reported.

On 28 September, the National Safety Court of Appeal endorsed all the convictions and sentences in a session that only lasted for few minutes. On 2 April 2012, activists case was moved to the civilian Court of Cessation. The next hearing on 23 April was postponed to 30 April, when one activist, Al-Hur Yousef al-Somaikh was released, after his sentence was reduced from two years to six months. The remaining thirteen were supposed to stand a retrial before the High Criminal Court of Appeal on 8 May. However, the hearing was postponed to 22 May due to the health conditions of al-Mahroos and al-Khawaja who was on hunger strike; both of them had been hospitalized. On 22 May, Hussain said he was tortured in 2011 to obtain confessions and beaten when he refused to record an apology to the king. The hearing was postponed to 29 May.

=== Responses ===
In a statement announced by his spokesman, Ban Ki-moon, the Secretary-General of the United Nations called for the release of all "political detainees" appealing to the "highest level" of government of Bahrain to "ensure the application of due process and respect for international human rights norms". Rupert Colville, spokesman of OHCHR said the sentences were "harsh" and expressed his "severe concern" due to "serious due process irregularities". Mark Toner, State Department spokesman of United States urged Bahrain government to "abide by its commitment to transparent judicial proceedings, conducted in full accordance with Bahrain's international legal obligations" and said the U.S. was "concerned about the severity of the sentences and the use of the military-linked security courts". He also cited President Barack Obama's remarks the previous month that "such steps are at odds with the universal rights of Bahrain's citizens". Alistair Burt, a British Foreign Officer expressed extreme concern from the trial process and said "It is deeply worrying that civilians are being tried before tribunals chaired by a military judge, with reports of abuse in detention, lack of access to legal counsel and coerced confessions".

The verdicts drew wide criticism from human rights organisations citing them as examples of "political and summary justice". Joe Stork, deputy Middle East director of Human Rights Watch said the charges were politically motivated and the trials unfair. Amnesty International criticized trying civilians in a military court calling the trials unfair. "[T]he court failed to adequately investigate allegations that some of the defendants were tortured and made to sign false confessions, which seem to have been used as evidence against them," said Malcolm Smart, the organisation Middle East and North Africa programme director.

Nabeel Rajab, the president of Bahrain Centre for Human Rights criticized the trials saying they do not meet international standards. "The people were sentenced for expressing their opinion and for opposing the government," he said. Ali Salman, head of Al Wefaq said the convictions go against recommendations by Barack Obama to restore calm before the start of a national dialogue. Khalil al-Marzooq, a leader in Al Wefaq said trials were "hurting the country's international standing". Saeed al-Shehabi, leader of London-based Bahrain Freedom Movement who was sentenced to life imprisonment in absentia, said accusations were invalid calling the government's reaction "draconian". "The world has seen how peaceful the demonstrations were. [Y]et, they were condemned as being terrorists," he said.

Hundreds of protesters tried to reach the site of Pearl Roundabout, but were teargassed by security forces. In Shia villages, protesters took to the streets only to be taken back by riot police. Bahrain government said the activists were behind "bringing the country to the brink of total anarchy" and that "[t]oday's sentencing sends a message that law and order will be preserved".

== Publications ==
Hussain has written a number of books in Arabic including:

- State and government.
- Sūrat al-Ḍuḥā.
- Reading statements of Imam Hussain revolution.
- Memory of the people.
- Quranic vision of human.
- Seeking refuge.

== Criticism ==
In a leaked cable dated to 19 October 2009, the US Embassy in Bahrain described Al Wafa' as a part of the "radical opposition" that uses ideology and religious credibility to gain supporters. The same cable quoted Mansoor Al-Jamri, editor-in-chief of the independent daily newspaper Al-Wasat, saying he was "concerned" about Hussain, because he was "a religious ideologue who has throughout his life gravitated to the extreme end of the Shia spectrum".
