= Manama incident =

The Manama incident on August 26, 2010 involved the arrest in the Seef Mall in Manama, Bahrain, of Fakhria al-Singace, the sister of Abduljalil al-Singace, a human-rights spokesperson for the Bahrain opposition Haq Movement. According to The New York Times, three women wearing the niqāb and abaya entered the mall and unfurled a banner reading, "It is forbidden to arbitrarily arrest and detain people". More than a dozen plainclothes and uniformed police officers surrounded them, and Fakhria al-Singace was handcuffed and arrested after being pinned spread-eagled to a cafe table. She was released the next day.

The women were protesting against the arrests of several human rights activists, including Abduljalil al-Singace, who was detained on August 13 at Bahrain International Airport after returning from a conference in London, where he had offered evidence about the human rights situation in Bahrain. The government has accused him of involvement in terrorism. The arrests are part of a crackdown on political opposition in Bahrain that saw 159 arrests in two weeks in August 2010, with many activists reportedly held without charge or access to lawyers or family members.

Amnesty International has asked the government to reveal the whereabouts of eight of the detainees, who include a number of Shia clerics. Local websites describing the situation have been blocked by the government.

The Sunni governing family is concerned about upcoming parliamentary elections on October 23 that could see it lose to the country's Shiite majority. Bahrain's close relationship with the United States — it hosts an American naval base — and its Shiite citizens' relationships with Iran, have added to the tension.

== Arrest of Abdul Jalil al-Singace ==
The country's opposition spokesman on human rights, Singace was arrested at Bahrain International Airport on August 13, when he returned with his family from a trip to London. He and another activist, Abd-al Ghani al-Khanjar, had attended a conference at the House of Lords on August 5, held to discuss human rights issues in Bahrain. Al-Khanjar was also arrested along with two others on August 15. On August 3, the Bahrain News Agency, a government press agency, quoted a National Security Agency source who said the arrests were related to a network seeking to undermine national security. The source said al-Singace had led "sabotage cells," and provided funds to the cells to carry out acts of terrorism. Because he is accused of having tried to overthrow the government, al-Singace could potentially face the death penalty, according to a Bahrain lawyer, Mohammad Al Tajer.

Singace, who uses a wheelchair as a result of partial paralysis from polio, was arraigned on August 27, and complained that he had been kept in solitary confinement, deprived of sleep, regular access to the bathroom and that his wheelchair and crutches were removed. He said he had been forced to sign documents without having a chance to review them.

== Other arrests ==
As of August 19, 2010 the United Arab Emirates-based Gulf News reported that eight activists and clerics had been arrested. By August 20, the number had risen to 12, according to Emirates247.com, citing the Gulf News. According to Bahrainian sheikh Rasheed Bin Abdullah Al Khalifa the arrests were due to "acts of incitement and sabotage ... risks and dangers to people's lives and their social and economic status as well as the country's domestic and international reputation." The deputy chief of public security announced that two rioters had been injured and twenty-five arson attacks had been carried out by August 22, as reported by the Khaleej Times. "

The number arrested increased dramatically after the incident at Seef Mall. On August 26, the Times reported that the number of detainees had risen to 159, and that it included young men not known as activists. The next day, the Gulf Daily News reported that Muhannad Abu Zeitoun, who works for the Arabic-language publication Al Watan, had been attacked by two masked men; the victim suggested that he had not been directly singled out for attack but rather that his newspaper had been for speaking out against violence and terrorism. Bahraini police and other democratic organizations condemned the assault, according to the Gulf Daily News report.

== Government crackdown ==
On September 6, the Gulf News reported a sweeping crackdown on the part of the Bahraini government. The country's National Security Agency (NSA) reported that it had "dismantled a terrorist network" including the arrest of at least ten leaders in charge of planning and raising funds and at least thirteen heads of cells overseeing "acts of sabotage" in various parts of the country. The NSA suggested the "terrorist networks" may have aimed to overthrow the government. No non-governmental sources were cited to corroborate the account.

On the same day, the Gulf News reported that the government of Bahrain intended to "check misuse of religion." Prince Khalifa Bin Salman Al Khalifa, Bahrain's Prime Minister, is reported to have sent a letter to the country's king, Hamad ibn Isa Al Khalifa, urging that they regain "the pulpits to avoid them being hijacked by incompetent politicians or preachers who have moved away from the nation's interests and asserting the nation's mandate is the starting point in our efforts to achieve a sound religious orientation."

A third report quoted rights groups who suggested that "more than 250 people have been detained [and that the] backlash spilled onto the streets with gangs and police clashing on opposite sides of barricades of burning tires." The preceding day, state media were reported to have released the photographs of 23 opposition figures ranging from professors to taxi drivers. No details of the alleged coup plot have been made public.
