= Ali Rabea =

Bahraini politician and leader of the Haq Movement

Ali Qasim Rabea (Arabic: علي قاسم ربيعة) is a leftist political activist in Bahrain, currently a leader of the Haq Movement. Before joining Haq, he was part of Wa'ad, Bahrain's largest leftist political party. Rabea was elected to the 1973 National Assembly before it was dissolved. He has been an opposition activist calling for the restoration of democracy in Bahrain. In October 1998, the government of Bahrain arrested him along with fellow opposition activist Isa Al Jowder, for signing a petition demanding political reform in the country.

He is one of the signatories to a 2008 petition calling for Prime Minister Khalifah ibn Sulman Al Khalifah to be sacked from office.

== See also ==
- Haq Movement
- Abdulhadi Khalaf

== Publications ==
- 'Popular Petition Committee in Bahrain's National Struggle'
- 'Ali Rabea Discusses the Nineties', Alwaqt newspaper: Parts: 1, 2, 3, 4, 5, 6, 7, last
- 'Democracy and Discrimination in Bahrain'
- 'Whither the National Movement'
