= Bahrain health worker trials =

Series of legal cases in Bahrain

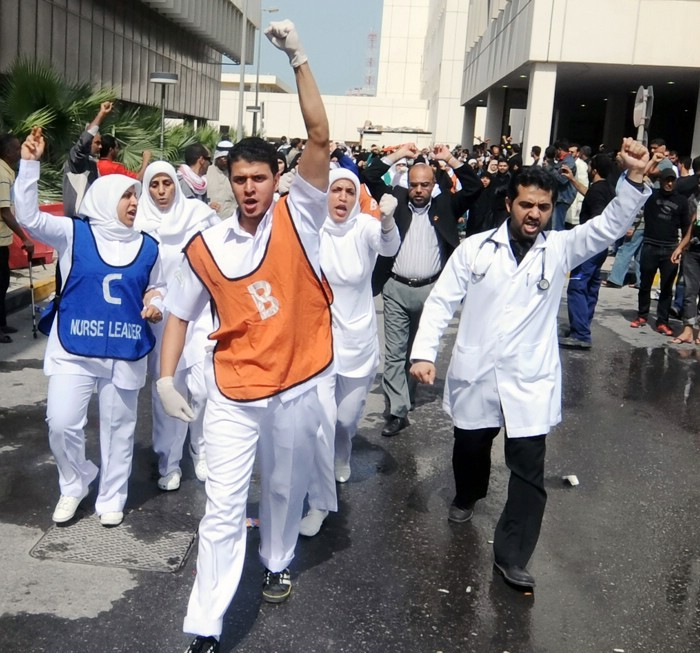
Health workers protest near Salmaniya Medical Complex following reports that paramedic crews and doctors were attacked in the 17 February raid at Pearl Roundabout.

The Bahrain health worker trials were a series of legal cases in which forty-eight doctors, nurses, and dentists faced charges for their actions during the Bahraini uprising of 2011. In September 2011, twenty of the health workers were convicted by a military court of felonies including "stockpiling weapons" and "plotting to overthrow the government". The remaining twenty-eight were charged with misdemeanors and tried separately. The following month, the felony sentences were overturned, and it was announced that the defendants would be retried by a civilian court. Retrials began in March 2012, but were postponed until June 14. Convictions of nine medical professionals were quashed and sentences for another nine were reduced. On 1 October of that year, the Court of Cassation upheld the prison terms for these nine defendants.

The case drew international attention and criticism, with organizations including the United Nations, the World Medical Association, Médecins Sans Frontières, the International Council of Nurses, Amnesty International, and Human Rights Watch expressing their concern over the health workers' military trials and sentences. An independent commission organized by the King of Bahrain concluded in November 2011 that many of the detained health workers had been subject to torture and abuse while in police detention.

== Role of health workers in the Bahrain uprising ==
Beginning in February 2011, Bahrain saw sustained pro-democracy protests, centered at Pearl Roundabout in the capital of Manama, as part of the wider Arab Spring. Authorities responded with a night raid on 17 February (later referred to by protesters as Bloody Thursday), which left four protesters dead and more than 300 injured.

Health workers played an important role in documenting the injuries, which were at the time downplayed or denied by the government of Bahrain. Rheumatologist Fatima Haji, for example, appeared on Al Jazeera television news in a "hysterical" state, describing Isa Abdul Hasan, a man in his 60s who died in her hospital of a head wound he had received from police: "I just started shouting: 'What the hell did this guy do, he was an old man. What did he do to deserve this?'" She later stated that following her arrest, her interrogations were centered on this television appearance.

At Salmaniya Medical Complex, doctors joined the protests themselves, speaking to protesters and media from the hospital stairs, after authorities blocked ambulances from bringing injured protesters there for care. The military responded by naming the hospital an opposition stronghold, taking it over on March 16.

== Arrests and charges ==
In March and April 2011, twenty health workers were arrested on a variety of felony charges for their actions during the protests, while an additional twenty-eight were arrested for misdemeanors. The total number of arrested health workers exceeded seventy. Dr. Ali Al-Ekri was arrested while performing surgery at Salmaniya Medical Complex.

Charges against the doctors included "occupying a hospital, stockpiling weapons, spreading lies and false news, inciting hatred of Bahrain's rulers and calling for their overthrow, and withholding treatment of Sunnis". The government additionally alleged that blood from hospital blood banks had been used to exaggerate wounds, that health workers had transported weapons to the protesters by ambulance, and that AK-47s had been confiscated inside the hospital during a police raid. State media described the defendants as having "a terrorist aim".

According to the prosecutor's case, al-Ekri acted as the group's ringleader, organizing staff at Salmaniya to oppose the Bahraini government. Al-Ekri was well known in Bahrain prior to the uprising for a January 2009 trip to the Gaza Strip to provide aid to Palestinians during the Gaza War. On his return, he received a number of awards, including one from the king. After his arrest, Al-Ekri stated that he was being persecuted for his comments to the media about police violence: "They know we witnessed all the crimes of the regime and we stood strong by injured people and we talked to the media ... Anywhere, like in Gaza and in Yemen now, doctors speak about what they see."

The defendants denied all charges and maintained that the accusations were politically motivated. In a joint statement, they held that "our only crime was that during the unrest earlier this year, we were outspoken witnesses to the bloodshed and the brutal treatment by the security forces." Bahraini MP Jamal Fakhro responded that Bahrain jails only "people who prefer to play politics rather than be doctors", not "doctors who treat people". A spokesman for Bahrain's Information Affairs Authority stated that the health workers were fabricating their stories and that they were "collaborating with the hard liners" in "an attempted coup d'etat".

British journalist Robert Fisk, who had been present at the protests, accused the Bahraini government of dishonesty: "Doctors I saw, drenched in their patients' blood, desperately trying to staunch the bullet wounds of pro-democracy demonstrators shot in cold blood by Bahraini soldiers and police, are now on trial ... How could these fine medical men and women have been trying to "topple" the monarchy? The idea that these 48 defendants are guilty of such a vicious charge is not just preposterous. It is insane, a total perversion – no, the total opposite – of the truth." In response, Bahrain's Information Affairs Authority threatened him with libel action.

The BICI supported the government account that medics occupied the first floor of Salmaniya hospital. However, it rejected the claim that medics had supplied protesters with weapons and stated that evidence supporting allegations that medics denied health care to patients was "hardly conclusive," as paraphrased by Al Jazeera English.

== Trials ==
=== Felony trials ===
The twenty health workers facing felony charges were found guilty and sentenced on 29 September 2011 by the military National Safety Court of First Instance. According to the International Federation for Human Rights, the trial lasted only a few minutes. Thirteen of the twenty received sentences of fifteen years' imprisonment, while five were sentenced to five years and two were sentenced to ten years. The sentences were a blow to the hopes of human rights groups lobbying on the health workers' behalf, which had predicted authorities would ease their stance after releasing some defendants on bail.

The defendants were scheduled to be retried by civilian courts after widespread international criticism. The prosecutor's office stated that the defendants' confessions, which had allegedly been given under torture, would not be used as evidence.

On 10 March 2012, Bahrain's Information Affairs Authority announced that the criminal charges against fifteen of the twenty would be dropped, and referred to a review board. Their decision was reversed without explanation the following week. The trials were postponed to 14 June.

On 14 June the court acquitted nine medics and downgraded sentences against nine others. Ali Al-Ekri was sentenced to five years imprisonment, another doctor to three years and seven were given from one month to one year. Two other doctors did not appeal their sentences of 15 years' imprisonment, instead fleeing the country. On 1 October, the Court of Cassation, the country's highest court, closed the first case involving twenty medics by upholding jail sentences on the remaining nine. Although the verdict is final, activist Mohamed al-Maskati said that they could still be pardoned by the king.

=== Misdemeanor trials ===
Of the 28 health workers charged with misdemeanors, 23 were convicted and five acquitted on 21 November 2012. Those convicted were sentenced to either serve three months in prison or pay 200 dinars (US$530). On 28 March 2013, 21 of the 23 convictions were overturned by an appeals court. The remaining two health workers had chosen not to appeal their sentences.

== Torture of health workers ==
Many of the detained health workers stated that they were ill-treated or tortured while in custody, leading Human Rights Watch and Amnesty International to call for independent investigations. Authorities reportedly forced detainees to stand for long periods, beat them with boards and rubber hoses, and deprived them of sleep in an effort to force confessions. In one case, a prisoner alleged that he had been forced to sign papers while blindfolded. Dr. Fatima Haji alleged that she was blindfolded and beaten in an effort to make her confess to faking the injuries to protesters during her Al Jazeera interview; she later identified her interrogator as a distant relative of the king. Ibrahim al-Demastani, head of the Bahrain Nurse's Society, alleged that he was deliberately kicked and kneed by guards in his back at a spot where he had told them he had a prolapsed disc; he was then denied medical care until he happened to meet a police officer to whom he had once taught first aid.

In an investigation by Human Rights Watch, Dr. Rula al-Saffar stated that she had been given electric shocks in the hands and face, and threatened with rape. Al-Ekri described being "constantly beaten by cables, hoses, and fists", as well as being forced to stand for a full day. Dr. Ghassan Dhaif stated that he remained handcuffed and blindfolded for 21 days, and "was beaten every hour". Dr. Basim Dhaif alleged that he was beaten in front of his children at his home at the time of his arrest, and eventually signed a false confession while in custody after authorities threatened to harm his family. Dr. Nader Dawani, a pediatrician, stated that he was forced to stand for seven days while being beaten by a female officer, and that other officers had tried to force a bottle into his anus.

The BICI verified that "many detainees were subjected to torture and other forms of physical and psychological abuse". The report stated that medics were among the tortured.

== Reactions ==
=== Domestic ===
Many Sunnis supporting the government of Bahrain stood against the doctors, accusing them of "deliberately worsening patient injuries for cameras" as well as "causing the deaths of protesters in order to discredit security personnel". The BICI report said that some of the Shia health workers refused to treat Sunni patients and instead used their positions to support activists by promoting their causes.

=== International ===
The trials drew sustained international attention, with governments, medical professional organizations, and human rights organizations issuing statements on behalf of the health workers.

==== Governments ====
The U.S. State Department stated that it was "deeply disturbed" by the sentences and urged the Bahraini government "to abide by its commitment to transparent judicial proceedings, including a fair trial, access to attorneys, and verdicts based on credible evidence". Following the conviction of nine medics on the retrials, the department said it was "deeply disappointed" that not all medics were acquitted and that "convictions appear to be based, at least in part, on the defendants' criticisms of government actions and policies". United Nations Secretary General Ban Ki-moon also expressed concern at the legality of the military trials, calling on the Bahraini government "to ensure the application of due process and respect for international human rights norms". A spokesman for the UN High Commissioner for Human Rights noted the office's "severe concerns" over "serious due process irregularities" in the trials.

==== Health worker organizations ====
In a letter published in The Guardian, the British Medical Association expressed its "deep concern" over the twenty felony convictions, stating that "all the independent evidence points to a politically motivated trial which has demonstrated a disregard for proper judicial process and fundamental principles of medical neutrality." The Australian Medical Association condemned the prosecutions, describing the defendants as "simply doing their jobs in places of conflict". Doctors Without Borders criticized doctors at Salmaniya Hospital for joining the protests, but described the military response as "exponentially more damaging" to medical neutrality. In May 2011, the group issued a statement on behalf of the health workers, urging that "doctors and nurses must be allowed to provide healthcare in line with medical ethics, without the fear of reprisal." The World Health Organization expressed similar concerns, stating that "health-care workers must be able to carry out their duty to treat injured people, regardless of their political affiliation, and even in times of conflict."

The International Council of Nurses and World Medical Association issued a joint statement objecting to the closed military trial and stated its belief that "Doctors and nurses have an ethical duty to care for patients irrespective of their race, colour, creed and political affiliation. No health professional should be put on trial for looking after injured and dying people." The U.K.-based Royal College of Nursing wrote to the Bahraini government on the health workers' behalf, as well as sending them a direct video message of support in which General Secretary Peter Carter said, "All you were doing was your job. You were trying to care for people."

==== Human rights organizations ====
International human rights groups said the accusations against doctors were "reprisals for treating injured protesters". Amnesty International described the charges as "ludicrous" and a "travesty of justice". The organization called for a letter-writing campaign on behalf of the convicted health workers, stating its belief "that the charges were politically motivated, that the proceedings did not meet international fair trial standards and that [the health workers] may be prisoners of conscience". Following the conviction of nine medics in the retrials, Amnesty said it was a "dark day for justice" and named them prisoners of conscience.

Freedom House called the trials part of "a pattern of repression that belies any promises of reform and honest political discourse by the government or the ruling family". Front Line Defenders also described the arrests as part of a "widespread pattern of repression". Human Rights Watch protested the alleged torture of the medics, condemned what it called the "fundamental unfairness" of the trials, and urged the appeals court to overturn the "flawed convictions". The Gulf Centre for Human Rights called on Bahrain's king to "intervene personally and immediately" to have the charges against the health workers dropped. The U.S.-based Physicians for Human Rights also called for the health workers' immediate release.

== See also ==
- College of Health Sciences, Bahrain
