= Hussain Jawad =

Bahraini human rights activist

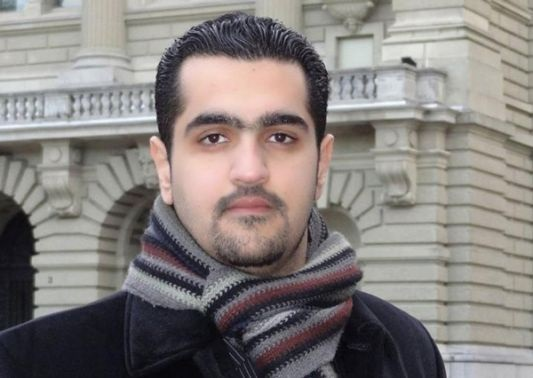
- Hussain Jawad in Bern, Switzerland in 2012.
- Born: 10 December 1987 (age 38); Bahrain
- Education: Law
- Occupation: Human rights activist
- Years active: 15 years
- Spouse: Asma Darwish (2011- 2020)
- Children: Parweez Jawad, Maryam Jawad
- Parent: Mohamed Jawad Parweez (father)
- Relatives: Nabeel Rajab (cousin)
- Website: Twitter

Hussain Jawad Parweez (Arabic: حسين جواد برويز; born 10 December 1987) is a leading Bahraini human rights activist. He is the Chairman and founder of the European-Bahraini Organisation for Human Rights (EBOHR). He is also one of the founders of Bahrain Youth Society for Human Rights and served as its vice-president from 2004 to 2006. Hussain has long been an advocate for peaceful and democratic change in Bahrain and is an active supporter of the freedom of expression and human rights. He has been a member of the Bahrain Centre for Human Rights since 2002.

Hussain Jawad, like many of his fellow activists, was detained as a result of his work as a human rights defender and for having freely expressed his opinion.

Hussain was arrested in a raid on his house on February 16, 2015. He stood trial on 17 March on charges of "collecting and receiving money from home and abroad in order to support and finance subversive groups". Hussain Jawad denied the charges and told the judge he was tortured when in custody of the Criminal Investigations Directorate (CID). On May 19, 2015, the 4th Lower Criminal Court ordered his release from prison with the guarantee of his place of residence. However, the cases against Mr. Jawad were not terminated (the court simply adjourned them) and Hussain still stands trial at a later date.

== Arrest and the Ongoing Trial ==
On Monday, February 16 at around 1:30 am local time masked police in plain clothes accompanied with riot police raided the house where Hussain lived together with his wife and a two-year-old son and arrested him without any explanations.

On February 18, Mr. Jawad was taken to the Public Prosecution without his lawyer or family being informed. The Public Prosecution ordered the release of Mr. Jawad pending trial on charges of "illegal gathering" and "rioting". However, he was not released but taken back to the CID to confess on a new case & other charges.

Hussain Jawad allegedly "confessed" to a number of charges when he appeared before the Public Prosecution again on 21 February. Later, on 23 February, he told the Public Prosecution that he had been tortured at the CID, including by being beaten, deprived of sleep, forced to stand for a prolonged period in a cold room, insulted, humiliated and threatened with rape and sexual assault, and forced to "confess". He was questioned by the Special Investigation Unit (SIU), the body mandated to investigate and bring to court allegations of torture and other violations by the security forces, and told them he was tortured and threatened with further torture if he withdrew his confession. There is no information on the outcome of the SIU investigation into Hussain Jawad's torture allegations up till now.

Hussain stood trial on 17 March before a Lower Criminal Court in Manama, the capital of Bahrain, on charges of "collecting and receiving money from home and abroad without authorization". He was tried together with two other individuals in the same case, of whom one is the Kuwaiti MP Abdulhamid Dashti. Hussain Jawad denied the charges and told the judge he was tortured when in custody of the CID. On May 19, 2015 Hussain was released from prison and the cases against him were adjourned to May 29 and November 7.

== International Reaction ==
On February 13, 2015, Jen Psaki, then a Spokesperson for the United States Department of State, at her daily press briefing said that US were closely following the case of Hussain Jawad and continue to gather more information. "We do plan to observe his trial, just as we often observe open hearings in Bahrain and other countries", she said when answering one of the questions.

In March 2015 (in response to a written question from Jeremy Corbyn MP), Tobias Ellwood MP, Minister of State in the United Kingdom's Foreign & Commonwealth Office, said that the government was closely following Mr Jawad's case and that UK has raised its concerns about the case. He also said that the British Embassy in Bahrain has raised the allegations of mistreatment made by Mr Jawad with the Ministry of Interior's Ombudsman and that the embassy officials have attended Mr Jawad's court appearances.

== Asylum in the UK ==
Hussain's active role as a human rights defender has previously led to him being subjected to harassment by the Bahraini authorities. The latest was his arrest in November 2013, when he went to file a complaint against the government claiming they were defaming him in a local newspaper. He was arrested on the spot at the Central Province Police station and taken to the dry dock prison where he spent 47 days. His arrest came following a speech he delivered calling for peaceful struggle and democracy. During his imprisonment he managed to monitor and document many cases and violations against detainees, which he revealed following his release in January 2014 on bail pending trial.

Looking for a better future, Jawad decided that it was best to leave Bahrain and seek refuge in the United Kingdom, where he could practice his job safely. He was greeted by UK Visas and Immigration officials at Heathrow airport, and taken to a medium security prison for illegal immigrants. His case was placed in a Detained Fast Track special program (DFT), designed for uncomplicated cases that would eventually be returned to their home countries, despite his strong case for asylum.

After UK Home Office did not process his application, Jawad decided to return to Bahrain and continue his fight for human rights on the ground. He left the UK on August 28, 2014.

== Family ==
Hussain's father is an independent human rights activist and a victim of torture - Mohammed Hasan Jawad, better known as Parweez. He has campaigned specifically for human rights on behalf of detainees and prisoners.

Parweez is 67 years old and has been imprisoned in Jau Central Prison since March 2011. He has been sentenced to 15 years in prison on charges of "conspiring to topple the regime and collaborating with a terrorist organization". Mohammed has been among thirteen Bahraini opposition leaders, rights activists, bloggers and Shia clerics arrested between 17 March and 9 April 2011 in connection with their role in the national uprising - a group that is internationally known as "Bahrain Thirteen".

== See also ==
- Bahrain Human Rights Society
