= Abdulhadi Khalaf =

Bahraini academic and activist (born 1945)

- Born: 1945 (age 80–81)
- Occupations: Leftist political activist and academic

Abdulhadi Khalaf (Arabic: عبد الهادي خلف, born 1945) is a Bahraini leftist political activist and senior lecturer in the Sociology Department at Lund University, in Sweden. He is regarded as a specialist in the politics of the Persian Gulf region.

== Biography ==
He received his primary and secondary education in Bahrain, then went abroad for college. He obtained a doctorate in sociology from Sweden's Lund University in 1972. Returning to Bahrain, he became a candidate for the country's first National Assembly and was elected in December 1973. The assembly was an advisory body with limited powers to approve laws drawn up by the government. Several months after the National Assembly convened, Khalaf was expelled and arrested on charges of supporting one of several banned political groups that called for a constitutional monarchy. He was released from prison in 1975. He was rearrested in 1976, again because of his political activities on behalf of democratic government.

Between 1975 and 1990, Khalaf worked as a consultant for a number of institutions, including UNECWA (now UNESCWA). In 1990, he accepted an appointment to teach sociology at the University of Lund and moved to Sweden. He continues to write articles about Bahrain's politics and society for Arabic and English publications across the Middle East. He has also written and published multiple books on the region.

== Bibliography ==
- Conditions and needs of Working Women in Bahrain, Ministry of Labour and Social Affairs, Manama, in 1983.
- Civil Resistance: Schools and forms of Mass Action, Arab Research Institute, Beirut, in 1988.
- Contentious Politics and State-Building in Bahrain, Research Reports in Sociology, 2000:1, Dept of Sociology, U. of Lund, ISBN 91-7267-004-5 in 2000.
  - Contentious Politics and State-Building in Bahrain, ISBN 91-7267-004-5 An Arabic translation published in 2000. Reprinted in 2004.
- Constitutional Reform and Political Participation in the Gulf, co-edited by Giacomo Luciani, Gulf Research Center, Dubai, 2006, ISBN 9948-432-53-3.

== See also ==
- Majeed Marhoon
- Ali Rabea
- Layla Fakhro
