= Law of Bahrain =

The Law(s) of Bahrain are based on what is written in its constitution. Bahrain's legal system is based on a combination of civil law (particularly influenced by Egyptian law, which is in turn heavily based on French law), and Islamic law. Along with the use of its constitution, Bahrain utilizes Amiri decrees to enact laws.

== History ==
Throughout Bahrain's history, its laws have been primarily in the hands of the rulers of the state. In 1783, the judiciary was also one of the responsibilities of the ruler. However, during the reign of Sheikh Isa bin Ali Al Khalifa, the judiciary began to shift to a more modern approach, establishing a court that handled foreigner disputes.

=== Major Laws/Events ===
In 1820, Bahrain signed a protectorate agreement with Great Britain, which helped influence its laws.

In 1958, Bahrain and Saudi Arabia sign the 'Saudi Arabia-Bahrain Agreement' which set the maritime boundaries that separate the two countries.

Bahrain wrote and established its first constitution in 1973. This constitution was an experiment for how the country could run as a democracy.

In 1975, Isa bin Salman Al Khalifa, the monarch of Bahrain, suspends the National Assembly, suppressing democracy throughout the 70s, 80s, and 90s.

The 2001 National Action Charter sets the stage for the 2002 Constitution.

== Present ==
In 2002, Bahrain wrote and established its current constitution, establishing it once again as a Constitutional Monarchy. This constitution saw the National Assembly re-established, separated into an upper house and a lower house.

== See also ==
- Judiciary of Bahrain
