= Bahrain Freedom Movement =

Bahrain Freedom Movement حركة أحرار البحرين الإسلامية
- Leader: Saeed al-Shehabi
- Founded: 1982
- Headquarters: London, United Kingdom
- Ideology: Constitutionalism; Islamism
- Religion: Shi'a Islam

Website
- Voice of Bahrain

The Bahrain Freedom Movement (Arabic: حركة أحرار البحرين الإسلامية, romanized: Harakat Ahrar al-Bahrayn) is a London-based Bahraini opposition group which has its headquarters in a north London mosque. Its main medium is the Voice of Bahrain website which was blocked for several years by Batelco, Bahrain's sole Internet service provider, on orders from the Ministry of Information.

The BFM played a leading role in the 1990s uprising in Bahrain.

It is led by Said Al Shehabi, who was formerly a member of Bahrain's main Shi'a Islamist party, Al Wefaq Islamic National Society but resigned along with several other members in September 2005 after it ended its boycott of parliamentary elections. Shehabi is a columnist with the London-based Arab newspaper, Al Quds Al Arabi.

The Bahrain government's political reforms in 2001 saw two of the BFM's most prominent leaders leave the movement. Under the reforms, all exiles were invited to return to Bahrain to participate in the political process, and leading members returned to their homeland. Although all of its members have received political amnesties and most have returned to Bahrain to participate in the political process, several have remained in London where they hold the status of asylum seekers.

On March 7, 2011, Al Shehabi alongside Hasan Mushaima, the leader of the Haq movement and Abdulwahab Hussain, the leader of the Wafa movement, formed the "Coalition for the Republic", calling for an overthrow of the Sunni government, because of the crackdown in February during the Bahraini uprising of 2011.

== See also ==
- List of Islamic political parties
- 1990s uprising in Bahrain
- List of political parties in Bahrain
- Politics of Bahrain
