= Hasan Mushaima =

Bahraini politician and Haq Movement secretary-general (born 1948)

Hassan Mushaima حسن مشيمع
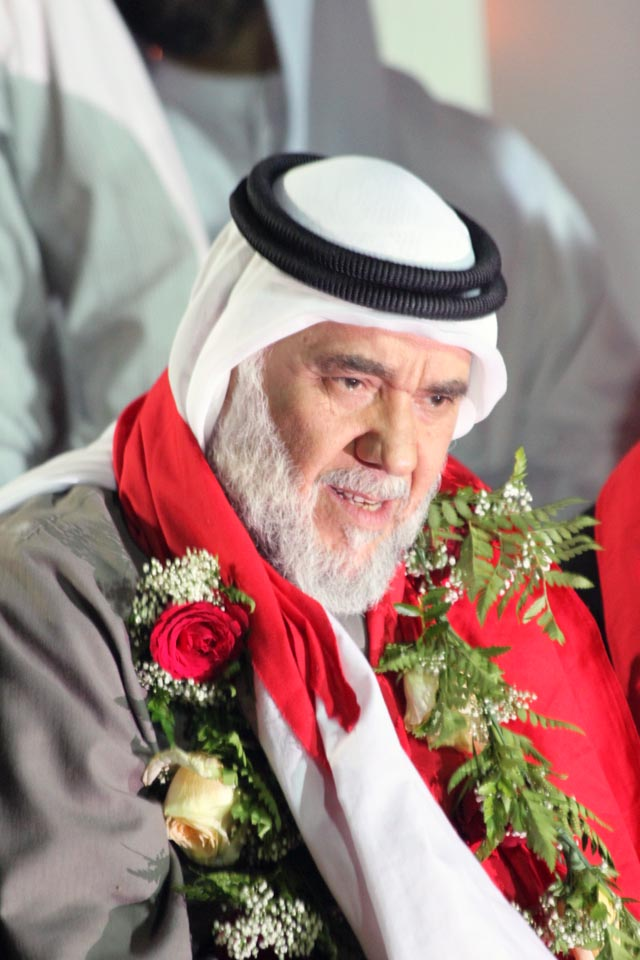
- Hassan Mushaima
- Born: 1948 (age 77–78); Jidd Haffs, Bahrain
- Opponent: Government of Bahrain

Secretary-General of Haq Movement
- Incumbent
- Assumed office November 11, 2005
- Deputy: Isa al-Jowder (d. 2011)

Personal details
- Party: Haq Movement (since 2005)
- Other political affiliations: Al Wefaq (until 2005)
- Criminal information
- Status: To be retried (2012)
- Criminal charges: Attempting to overthrow the Bahraini monarchy
- Penalty: Life imprisonment

Hasan Mushaima (Arabic: حسن مشيمع) is an opposition leader in Bahrain and the secretary-general of the Haq Movement, an important opposition party in Bahrain. Before forming Haq, he was a founding member of Al Wefaq and a leading figure in the 1994 uprising in Bahrain. He has campaigned for more democratic rights in Bahrain and has been in prison in Bahrain since his arrest in 2011.

== Political activity ==
=== 1990s uprising ===
The Bahraini government has placed Mushaima under arrest several times, twice arresting him during the 1994 uprising. He was later jailed from March 1995 to September 1995 and again from January 1996 to February 2001. Mushaima was detained for one day in February 2007 and was arrested and imprisoned again from January 2009 to April 2009.

=== Political activities in the 2000s ===
In 2010 Mushaima travelled to Great Britain to be treated for lung cancer.

=== Bahraini uprising (2011–present) ===
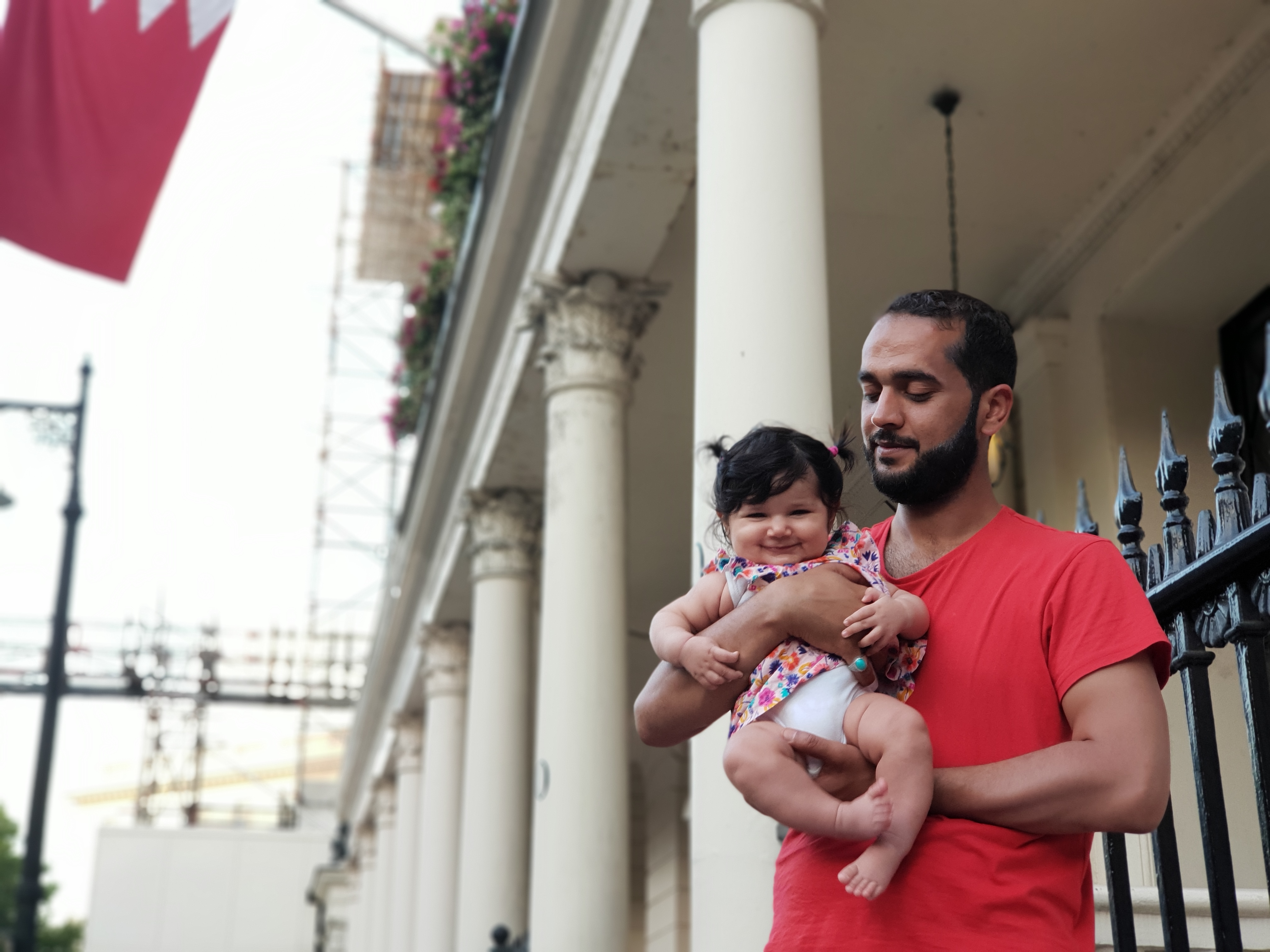
Hassan Mushaima's son Ali on hunger strike outside the Bahraini embassy in 2018.

Mushaima announced plans to return to Bahrain during the protests in February 2011, but authorities detained him in Lebanon while en route, possibly at the request of the Bahraini government. Mushaima finally did return to Bahrain on Saturday, February 26, 2011. On that day, he was described by the Associated Press as being "welcomed like a rock star," by protestors in Pearl Square. He reportedly told followers that "The dictator fell in Tunisia, the dictator fell in Egypt and the dictator should fall here."

On 7 March 2011, Mushaima along with Abdulwahab Hussain, the leader of the Wafa movement, and Saeed Alshehabi, the leader of the Bahrain Freedom Movement, formed the "Alliance for the Republic" (Arabic:التحالف من أجل الجمهورية), because of their belief that the Bahraini regime lost legitimacy after the harsh crackdown on protesters using heavy weapons. One month after protests, the Gulf Cooperation Council sent 1,500+ PSF troops (1,000 Saudi, some Qatari troops and 500 Emirati policemen) to crush the popular uprising there and also sent the Kuwaiti Navy to stop any aid to the protesters by sea. After the protesters were kicked from the Pearl Roundabout, many known rights activists operating in Bahrain were arrested, including Mushaima.

On 22 June 2011, Mushaima was sentenced to life imprisonment by a military court for "attempting to overthrow the monarchy".

On 30 April 2012, a Bahraini court ordered a civilian retrial of Mushaima and 20 other men convicted of leading the uprising.

In 2018, Mushaima's son Ali Mushaima began a hunger strike outside the Bahraini embassy in London, protesting the denial of medical treatment for political prisoners including Hassan Mushaima.

On 15 September 2021, he declined a conditional release offer.

== See also ==
- Bahrain Thirteen
