= Isa al-Jowder =

Isa Al Jowder عيسى الجودر
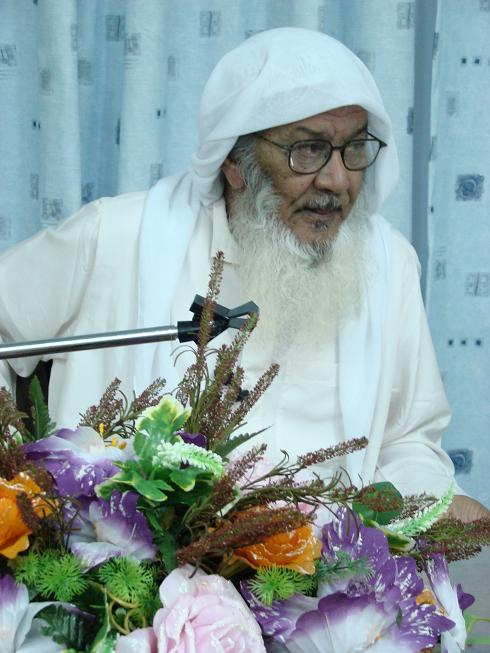

Deputy Secretary General of Haq Movement
- In office November 11, 2005 – September 24, 2011
- President: Hasan Mushaima
- Succeeded by: TBD

Personal details
- Born: c. 1937
- Died: September 24, 2011 (aged 74)
- Party: Haq Movement

Sheikh Isa Abdullah Al Jowder (Arabic: الشيخ عيسى عبدالله الجودر) was a Sunni cleric and nationalist political activist in Bahrain. He was a member of the Haq Movement. He was a signatory to both the 1992 and the 1994 petitions calling on the then Amir to reinstate the authority of the 1973 elected parliament (dissolved by an Amiri decree in 1975). He was briefly arrested by the government during the 1990s Uprising. He had previously been arrested for his political activities in 1957, 1963 and 1968.

He died on Saturday, September 24, 2011.
