= Manama Paper =

Declaration by opposition parties in Bahrain

The Manama Paper, also referred to as the Manama Letter or Manama Document, is a document issued on 12 October 2011 by five opposition parties in Bahrain, including the Shia group Al Wefaq, in which they repeat their calls for a restructuring of the political system as well as other democratic demands following the Bahraini uprising (2011–present).

The list of demands includes "an elected government", "a fair electoral system", redrawing constituencies to guarantee better representation, "a legislative authority with a single chamber that would have exclusive legislative, regulatory, financial and political authorities" and "ending discrimination against the Shiite majority". A chief complaint of the opposition is the naturalisation of foreigners "on political grounds," which they allege to be an attempt to change the demographic balance in favour of the Sunnis.

One major part of the Manama Paper was the call for a "genuine dialogue" after the opposition pulled out in July of a high-profile national dialogue called for by King Hamad to discuss reforms in the kingdom. This is a significant change to their stance in February and March 2011, when the opposition refused to negotiate with the government without several preconditions.
