= Mohammed al-Tajer =

Bahraini human rights lawyer

Mohammed Issa Altajer
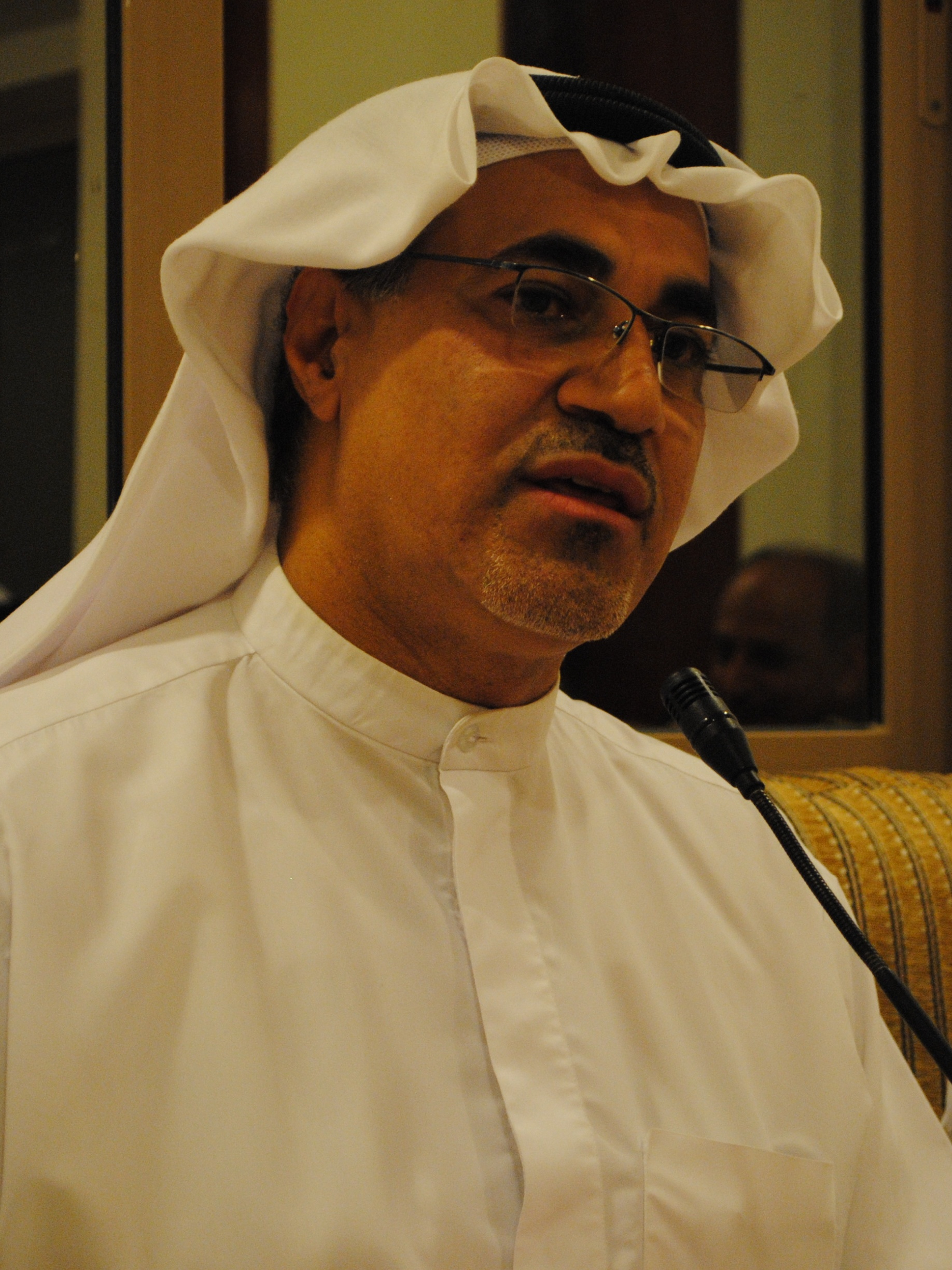
- Mohammed Altajer in September 2012
- Occupation: Human rights lawyer
- Known for: 2011 arrest

Mohammed Issa Altajer (Arabic: محمد عيسى التاجر) is a Bahraini human rights lawyer who was detained for several months in 2011, apparently for his role in defending Arab Spring protesters.

In early 2011, following the self-immolation of young Tunisian merchant Mohamed Bouazizi, a series of pro-democratic uprisings swept the Middle East, later to be known as the "Arab Spring". Bahraini activists joined the movement with a series of protests beginning on 14 February, which escalated into the Bahraini uprising. In March, King Hamad bin Isa Al Khalifa declared martial law and a three-month state of emergency.

Following the arrests of some protesters, Altajer coordinated a team of 25 defense lawyers to help those activists in incommunicado detention. Altajer's wife Huda al-Juffairi, a medical doctor, was also active in providing medical aid to injured protesters.

Altajer was arrested without a warrant on 16 April 2011 at his home in Manama by more than 20 masked security officers, in front of his wife and children. The officers also confiscated laptops, mobile phones, and documents, and demanded the keys to Altajer's law office, forcing him to turn them over. His bank account was also frozen. On June 12, 2011, he was brought before a military tribunal; his attorneys were given no notice and were therefore not present. He was charged with inciting hatred for the regime, engaging in illegal protests, and inciting people to harm police, and pleaded not guilty.

On 7 August 2011, Altajer was released from prison, though the charges against him appeared not to have been dropped. As one of the conditions of his release, he signed papers agreeing that he would not participate in "any activity against the country". He stated that he had been abused while in captivity by being beaten and deprived of sleep.

Altajer's arrest led to international outcry, with statements of protest from Human Rights Watch, the International Federation for Human Rights, Front Line Defenders, the Bahrain Centre for Human Rights, and the New York City Bar Association. Amnesty International also called for the dismissal of charges against him, designating him a prisoner of conscience during his detention.
