= Abduljalil al-Singace =

Bahraini human rights activist (born 1962)

Abduljalil al-Singace عبدالجليل السنكيس
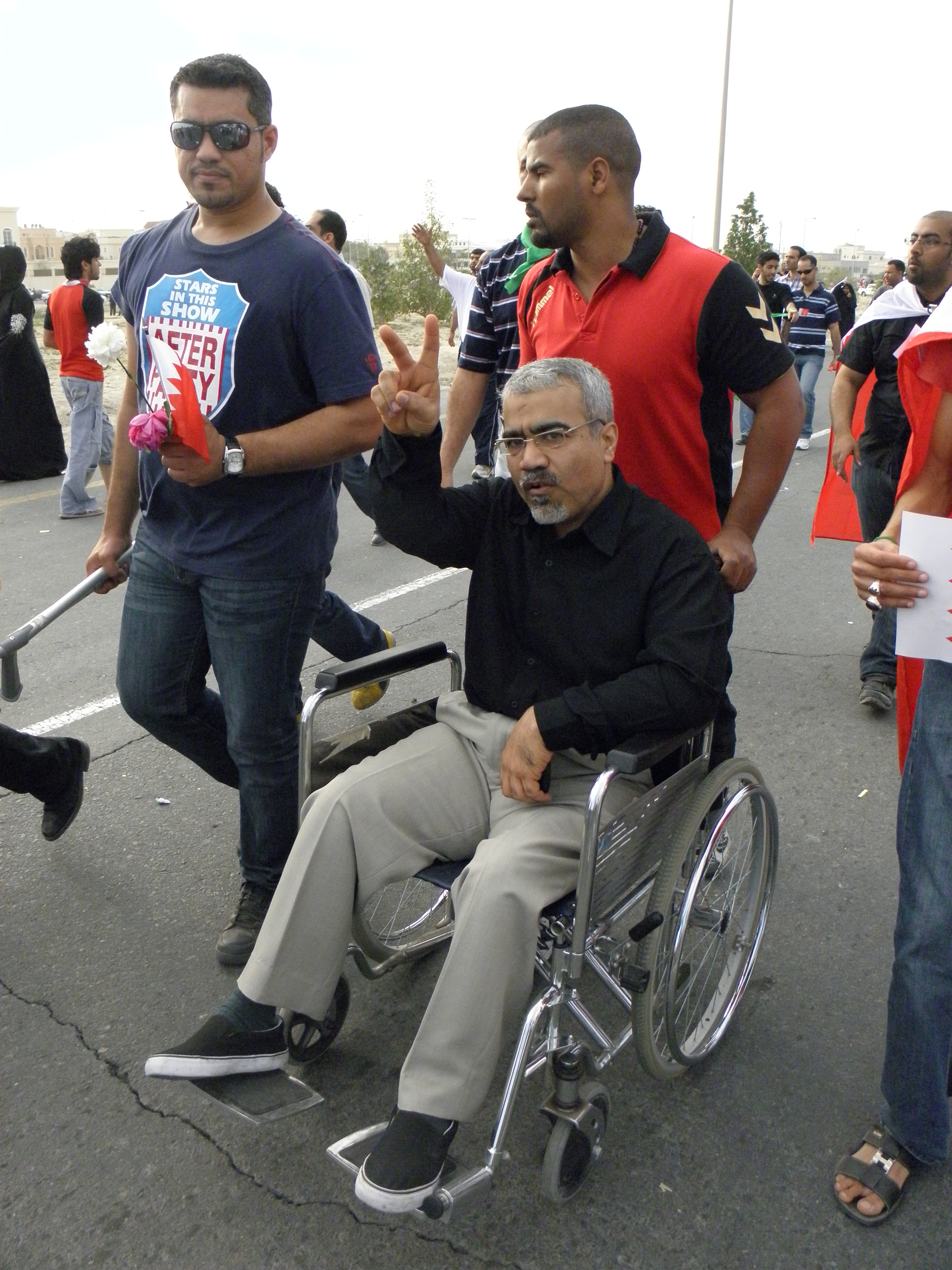
- Al-Singace taking part in a protest in 2011 on his wheelchair
- Born: January 15, 1962 (age 64); Bahrain
- Occupation: Human rights activist
- Criminal charge: plotting to topple the government
- Criminal penalty: Life imprisonment
- Criminal status: To be retried

Abduljalil Abdulla al-Singace (Arabic: عبدالجليل عبدالله السنكيس, born January 15, 1962) is a Bahraini engineer, blogger, and human rights activist. He was arrested in 2009 and 2010 for his human rights activities and released later. In 2011, he was arrested, allegedly tortured and sexually abused, and sentenced to life imprisonment for pro-democracy activism during the Bahraini uprising. Al-Singace has continued to receive support from human rights organizations alongside Bahraini leaders while imprisoned.

== Background ==
Abduljalil Al-Singace is an engineer by training and was an associate professor of engineering at the University of Bahrain. Until 2005, he was the chief of mechanical engineering department when he was demoted by the head of university. His family have said that then-Prime Minister, Khalifa bin Salman Al Khalifa, was behind this decision, due to Al-Singace's human rights activity.

== Medical history ==
Al-Singace was diagnosed with polio at a young age. Due to his paralysis, he usually uses a wheelchair or crutches for mobility. In addition to polio, Al-Singace suffers from a multitude of conditions that are not being addressed in prison, which include arthritis, carpal tunnel syndrome, vision issues, dental problems, tremors, respiratory concerns, an unspecified skin condition, and prostate concerns.

== Activism ==
Al-Singace was a member of Al Wefaq's board of directors. He resigned in 2005 and joined the newly formed Haq Movement for Liberty and Democracy, becoming the head of its Human Rights Bureau and its official spokesman. Al-Singace began to operate a blog titled "Al-Faseelah", critical of a perceived lack of freedom in Bahrain. During a visit of George W. Bush to Bahrain in 2008, Al-Singace attempted to present him with a petition of 80,000 signatures protesting his description of Bahrain as a democracy and demanding the "right to draft a democratic constitution". In January 2009, he was arrested on charges that he had participated in a "terror plot" and that his blog articles had "incited hatred against the regime". His blog was also blocked by authorities in February of that year, leading the Bahrain Centre for Human Rights to begin a letter-writing campaign calling for authorities "to respect freedom of expression, particularly for human rights defenders". Al-Singace was soon released following "international and local pressure", and was eventually given a royal pardon.

In June 2009, Al-Singace wrote an op-ed for The New York Times calling on Barack Obama not to talk to the Muslim world about democracy unless he truly meant to pursue it.

== Arrests ==
In August 2010, Al-Singace spoke at a conference at the British House of Lords, at which he criticized Bahrain's handling of human rights issues. On landing at Bahrain International Airport with his family on 13 August, he was arrested. A security official stated that Al-Singace had "abused the freedom of opinion and expression prevailing in the kingdom". Government officials later stated that Al-Singace had been arrested for "inciting violence and terrorist acts". Al-Singace was represented by Mohammed al-Tajer, who would himself be arrested by security forces the following year.

Al-Singace was held incommunicado until February 2011, during which time he alleges that he suffered "physical and mental torture" as well as solitary confinement at the hands of authorities. He was briefly released before being re-arrested in March, following the widespread protests of the 2011-2012 Bahraini uprising.

On 17 March 2011, two days after protesters were evacuated from the Pearl Roundabout, Al-Singace was arrested. His family said that in the middle of night about four dozens of police, some masked in plainclothes and some people speaking in a Saudi accent, broke into their house. A family member stated that Al-Singace was beaten inside his house and on the street during the arrest, and he "saw them drag [Abdul Jalil] in his underwear and without his glasses, with a gun pointed at his head". His eldest son, Husain (28 years old) was arrested the next week and sentenced by a military court to seven years in prison on 6 October.

=== Imprisonment and mistreatment ===
Al-Singace was first taken to police station for few hours before being moved to Al Qurain military prison. According to his family, one month after his arrest, Al-Singace was allowed to make a ninety-second phone call to them, and another one the following month. A Bahrain Independent Commission of Inquiry (BICI) report revealed that Al-Singace was verbally and physically abused, and sexually assaulted, losing more than 10kg and suffering from multiple health problems as a result. According to the report, he was beaten on a daily basis, and he told his daughter that he was raped and sexually abused by "finger thrust into his anus."

Despite being handicapped, Al-Singace was forced to stand on his good leg without crutches for prolonged periods, put in solitary confinement for two months in a 2m x 3m dark cell and humiliated by being forced to "lick the shoes and wipe them on his face". Al-Singace also stated at his trial that his prescription glasses and medications had been taken from him for nine weeks.

=== Trial ===
He was brought to trial by the military National Safety Court in June 2011 and was charged with "plotting to topple" the government, receiving a life sentence. The appeals chamber of the National Safety Court upheld the sentence on 28 September.

Responding to the verdict, the Committee to Protect Journalists condemned the Bahraini government's "stunning disregard for due process and basic human rights". Reporters Without Borders also protested Al-Singace's sentence, stating that his only crime was "freely expressing opinions contrary to those of the government". English PEN described its organization as "shocked" by the sentence and began a letter campaign calling for Al-Singace's "immediate and unconditional release". Dutch European Parliament member Marietje Schaake has also spoken out in protest of Al-Singace's imprisonment. The Bahraini Press Association described the verdict as "unfair and outrageous", "marred by abuses and violations of all legal and human rights standards".

== Support ==
On 13 August 2022, several human rights organizations released a joint statement urging the King of Bahrain, Shaikh Hamad bin Isa Al Khalifa, to release Al-Singace immediately. On 15 January 2023, an additional letter was sent to bring the awareness of Al-Singace's imprisonment and others, with the support of 19 human rights organizations, once again addressed to the King, as well as the Prime Minister and Crown Prince Salman bin Hamad Al Khalifa. The support has continued, with the most recent letter to the King sent in July 2024; Al-Singace has been on a hunger strike for more than three years, with his health at a heightened risk.

Al-Singace's case has also seen support from multiple parliamentary bodies. British MPs issued an early day motion in his support and the European Parliament called for the release of Al-Singace and other Bahraini prisoners of conscience.

In October 2022, Dr. Al-Singace was honored as the 2022 PEN Prize International Writer of Courage; the award is for those who participate in the freedom of speech, without the discouragement of the public.

In November 2023, he received the MESA Academic Freedom Reward as a way for the organization to call attention to general human rights abuses in Bahrain.
