= Haq Movement =

Haq Movement for Liberty and Democracy حركة حق حركة الحريات والديمقراطية
- Leader: Hasan Mushaima
- Founded: November 2005
- Ideology: Constitutionalism

Website
- X account: https://x.com/HAQ_MOVEMENT

The Haq Movement for Liberty and Democracy (Arabic: حركة حق حركة الحريات والديمقراطية, romanized: Ḥarakat Ḥaqq Ḥarakat al-Ḥurrīyāt wa-al-Dīmuqrāṭīyah) is an opposition political organization in Bahrain founded in November 2005 with Hasan Mushaima as its secretary general. Several of its leaders were previously in the leadership of the Al Wefaq society, a Shi'a Bahraini political party, but it also contains others such as Ali Rabea, a secular nationalist and former member of parliament previously associated with the National Democratic Action Society, and Shaikh Isa Al Jowder, a Sunni cleric.

== Background ==
Haq opposed participation in the parliamentary elections because it considers the 2002 Constitution of Bahrain to be illegal and unilaterally imposed by King Hamad ibn Isa Al Khalifah, replacing the 1973 Constitution.

Haq called on the United Nations on 15 November 2006 to investigate allegations that a secret government grouping has been conspiring to fuel sectarian tensions and rig the results of upcoming parliamentary and municipal elections. In a letter addressed to UN Secretary-General Kofi Annan and delivered to Sayed Aqa, the UN Development Programme's (UNDP) Bahrain coordinator, Haq called for the formation of an international fact-finding committee to scrutinize the claims made in an August report by the Gulf Centre for Democratic Development (GCDD).

The 240-page report, dubbed Bandar Gate after its co-author Salah Al Bandar — a Briton of Sudanese origin who was deported in September to Britain after its publication — alleged that a ring masterminded by a government minister was secretly planning to manipulate the demographic makeup of the country, through the selective granting of citizenship.

== Prominent figures of Haq Movement ==
- Hasan Mushaima (Secretary General)
- Abdul Wahhab Hussain
- Abdul Jalil al-Singace
- Shaikh Isa al-Jowder (Sunni cleric)
- Ali Rabea
- Sayed Hadi Jawad al-Aali
- Abbas Abdul Aziz Nasser
- Layla Khalil Dishti
- Abduljalil Al-Singace, professor of engineering at the University of Bahrain, director of the movement’s Human Rights Bureau, was tried on 27 September 2011 and received a life sentence.

== See also ==
- 1990s Uprising in Bahrain
- Bandar Gate
- List of political parties in Bahrain
- Manama incident
