= Judiciary of Bahrain =

The judiciary of Bahrain is a system of three courts that interpret and apply the laws of the Kingdom of Bahrain. The three courts are the Civil Courts, Sharia Courts, and Criminal Courts. Civil Courts have jurisdiction to adjudicate all commercial, civil, and administrative disputes, as well as disputes related to the personal status and domestic relations of non-Muslims. The Sharia Courts, which apply Sharia law, have jurisdiction over all aspects of the personal status of Muslims. Criminal Courts have the jurisdiction to deal with criminal matters.

Each of these three courts has lower and high courts, whose judges are nominated by the Supreme Judicial Council and appointed by decree by the King of Bahrain. The Supreme Judicial Council, chaired by the King, appoints the members of the Constitutional Court. To secure renewal of these positions, judges may be prone to consider it necessary to take decisions not unfavourable to the wishes or interests of the Government.

== History ==
The first regular court in Bahrain was established in 1922. The judiciary was divided into a civil judiciary and a Shari'at judiciary.

The highest courts are: Court of Cassation (consists of the chairman and 3 judges); Supreme Court of Appeal (consists of the chairman and 3 judges); Constitutional Court (consists of the president and 6 members); High Sharia Court of Appeal (court sittings include the president and at least one judge).

== Court of Cassation ==
The Court of Cassation was established in 1989 as a supreme court of appeal. It serves as the final court of appeal for all civil, commercial, and criminal matters. The judges for the court are appointed and removed by royal decree. The current Chief Justice of Bahrain and president of the Court of Cassation is Khalifa bin Rashid Al Khalifa, a cousin of King Hamad and the prime minister, and a member of the Al Khalifa ruling family of Bahrain.

== National Safety Court ==
The National Safety Court (Arabic: محكمة السلامة الوطنية) is a special military court that was set up in March 2011 to try protesters, opposition leaders, rights activists, and people who supported or are perceived as supporting the Bahraini uprising. A military judge presides over the court, along with two civilian judges, all of them appointed by the Bahrain Defence Force commander-in-chief, Marshal Khalifa bin Ahmed Al Khalifa, a cousin of King Hamad and the prime minister, and a member of the Al Khalifa royal family. The cases are prosecuted by the military public prosecutor Colonel Yousef Rashid Flaifel.

The National Safety Court has been heavily criticized by international human rights organizations for trying civilians in a military court and for the lack of transparency and due process. Human Rights Watch has described the court as a "travesty of justice", while Amnesty International has described it as a "sham" and "a parody of justice."

In June 2011, King Hamad announced that all trials related to the protests would be transferred from the National Safety Court to the normal civilian courts. However he backtracked on August 18, issuing a decree which made it clear that the new measures did not apply to all arrested protesters.

== See also ==
- Law of Bahrain
- Constitution of Bahrain
