= March of loyalty to martyrs =

2011 protest in Manama, Bahrain as part of the country's ongoing uprising

- Part of 2011 Bahraini uprising
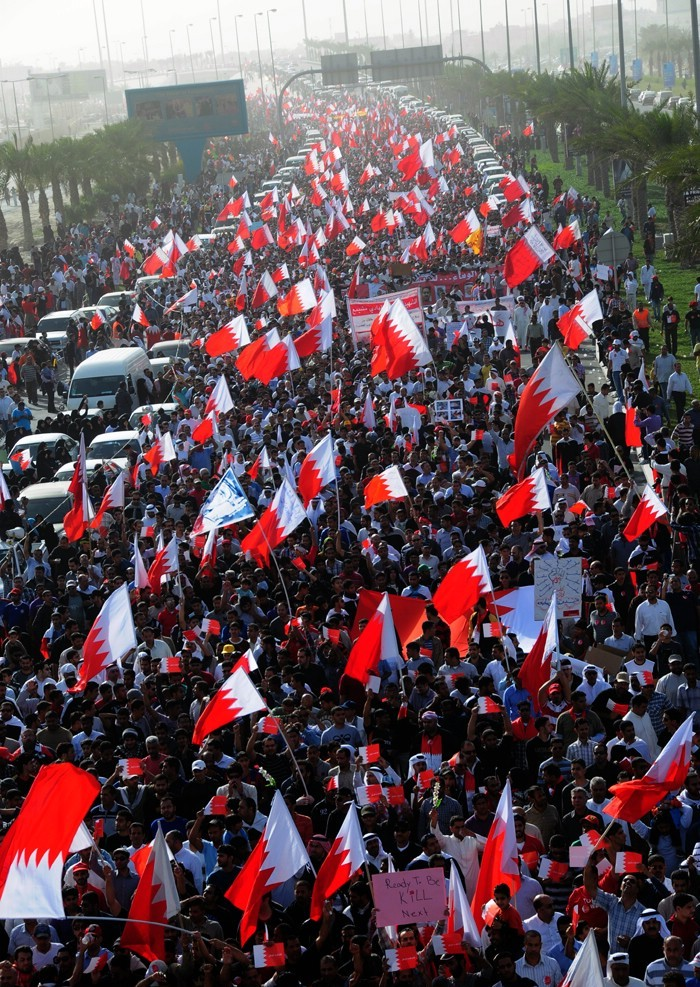
- Over 100,000 took part in the protest which stretched for several miles.
- Time: 2:00 pm till 5:00 pm
- Location: Manama, Bahrain; 26°01′39″N 50°33′00″E
- Cause: Part of the 2011 Bahraini uprising
- Participants: Over 100,000 protesters

The March of loyalty to martyrs (Arabic: مسيرة الوفاء للشهداء masīra al-wafāʾ ash-shuhadāʾ) was a protest on 22 February 2011 in Manama, Bahrain. Tens of thousands participated in the protest, one of the largest in the Bahraini uprising. Named after the seven victims killed by police and army forces during previous protests, the march filled the space between Bahrain Mall and Pearl Roundabout. Protesters carried Bahrain's flag and demanded the fall of the government, implementation of a constitutional monarchy and other reforms, with some of them also demanding the end of the regime.

The march was named the largest in the country's history by organizers; sources estimated that over 100,000 protesters (20% of Bahrain's citizens) participated, although other sources gave higher and lower estimations. A number of ambulance drivers, police and army officers joined the protest. Security forces were not present and unlike previous protests, it ended peacefully.

== Background ==
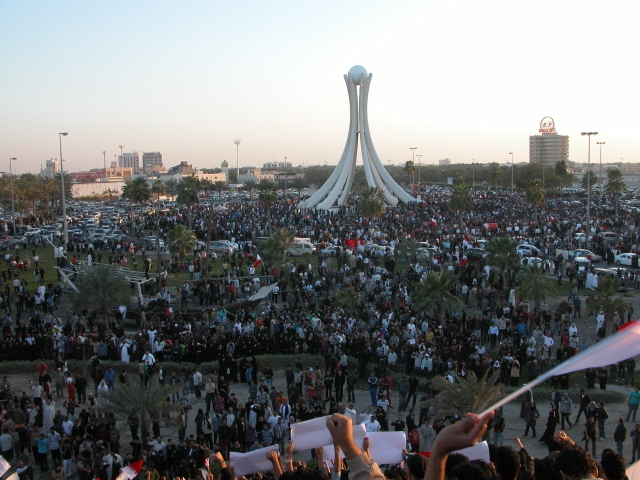
Protesters gather for the first time in Pearl Roundabout on 15 February.

Protests inspired by the successful uprisings in Egypt and Tunisia erupted in Bahrain on 14 February. Security forces responded by firing tear gas, rubber bullets, sound bombs and birdshot into the crowd of protesters. More than thirty protesters were injured and one died from birdshot injuries in his back. Another protester was killed the same way the next day, on 15 February, when over 10,000 protesters occupied Pearl Roundabout.

On 17 February, police launched a pre-dawn raid on sleeping protesters. Four protesters were killed and more than 300 were injured. Health workers and a journalist were allegedly attacked by security forces. The army was deployed after Pearl Roundabout was cleared of protesters and checkpoints were set up. Protesters moved to Salmaniya Hospital's car parks where thousands protested against the government.

The following day, army forces stationed in the Pearl Roundabout fired live ammunition on hundreds of protesters who tried to re-occupy the site. At least 120 protesters were hurt and one was fatally wounded, bringing the number of deaths to seven. The Crown Prince offered dialogue with opposition parties. On 19 February, tens of thousands of protesters re-occupied Pearl Roundabout after the army was ordered to withdraw.

On 21 February, the king canceled the Formula 1 race originally scheduled for 13 March. The Associated Press named the decision "another victory" for protesters who had called for its cancellation. "We felt it was important for the country to focus on immediate issues of national interest and leave the hosting of Bahrain's Formula One race to a later date", the king stated.

In the evening, tens of thousands of government supporters, borrowing the anti-government protesters' slogan "no Sunni, no Shia, only Bahraini", gathered in Al Fateh Mosque in Juffair. One participant interviewed by The New York Times said, "The democracy they have been asking for is already here, but the Shias, they have their ayatollahs, and whatever they say, they will run and do it. If they tell them to burn a house, they will. I think they have a clear intention to disrupt this country".

The next day, appearing on Bahrain's official news agency, the king ordered the release of 50 political prisoners, including 25 Shia activists arrested during the 2010 crackdown and accused of forming a "terrorist network" whose goal was to overthrow the government. Ali Abdulemam, a prominent blogger and founder of Bahrain Online opposition forum, was among those who were released. Blogger and human rights activist Abduljalil al-Singace, who called the move "a good step" and a "positive gesture", was also released. However, according to human rights activist Nabeel Rajab, about 400 more activists remained in prison on "politically inspired charges".

== Loyalty to Martyrs ==
In the afternoon of 22 February tens of thousands of children, men and women occupied and marched on the main streets of Manama. The march was called "The march of loyalty to martyrs" in reference to those killed in previous protests. It stretched for several miles, filling the eastern side of Sheik Khalifa bin Salman Highway from Bahrain Mall to Pearl Roundabout located in Manama's business district.

The protesters, while carrying the white-and-red flag of Bahrain and posters of the seven victims, chanted: "Ash-shab yurid isqat an-nizam" ("the people want to bring down the regime"), "Egypt, Tunisia, are we any different?" and "No Shia, No Sunni, only Bahraini". Most demanded the fall of the Bahrain government. "Some want the family out but most only the prime minister", said a protester interviewed by BBC. The march was led by ambulance drivers who reported being attacked by security forces while trying to help treat protesters from the Pearl Roundabout injured on 17 February, which came to be called Bloody Thursday.

Protest organizers, which consisted of a loose coalition of seven political parties including Al Wefaq and Wa'ad, named the march the largest in Bahrain's history. Associated Press, The Huffington Post, The New York Times and Voice of America estimated that there were over 100,000 participants. The New York Times described the number as "astonishing", because Bahraini citizens total number was a little over 500,000. The BBC described the course of march as a "sea of red and white flags". Other estimates varied between 30,000 and 200,000 participants. In their documentary film Bahrain: Shouting in the Dark, Al Jazeera English stated, "Bahrain held its largest march in history; the world media recorded nearly a quarter of all citizens in the streets". The BICI report mentioned that "by many accounts more than 100,000 people were marching" and that the number of protesters at Pearl Roundabout peaked at over 150,000. IFEX estimated the number to be as high as 200,000; however, CNN Arabic said the number was just about 30,000.

Security forces did not intervene to disperse the march, however a state-owned helicopter hovered overhead. A small number of police and army officers participated in the protest. Denouncing army troops who opened fire on protesters, an officer said, "What we did to the people was not heroic. We ask the people to forgive us, we ask the people for forgiveness". Another officer added, "The weapons that have been used against the people are weapons of shame, these weapons should be used to protect the people, and not be used against them. That's why we've decided to be with the people".

The widow of one of the seven "martyrs" read a statement after the march that listed the opposition's demands; the most important demands were the resignation of the forty-year-long government headed by the king's uncle and the implementation of a constitutional monarchy. Other demands included the immediate commencement of an "impartial" investigation into the deaths, the neutralization of the state media and the release of the remaining "political" prisoners. Analysts stated that the large size of the protest pressured the government to concede to the protesters' demands. Al Jazeera English said that "unless they offered deep reforms, the Khalifas will likely fall".

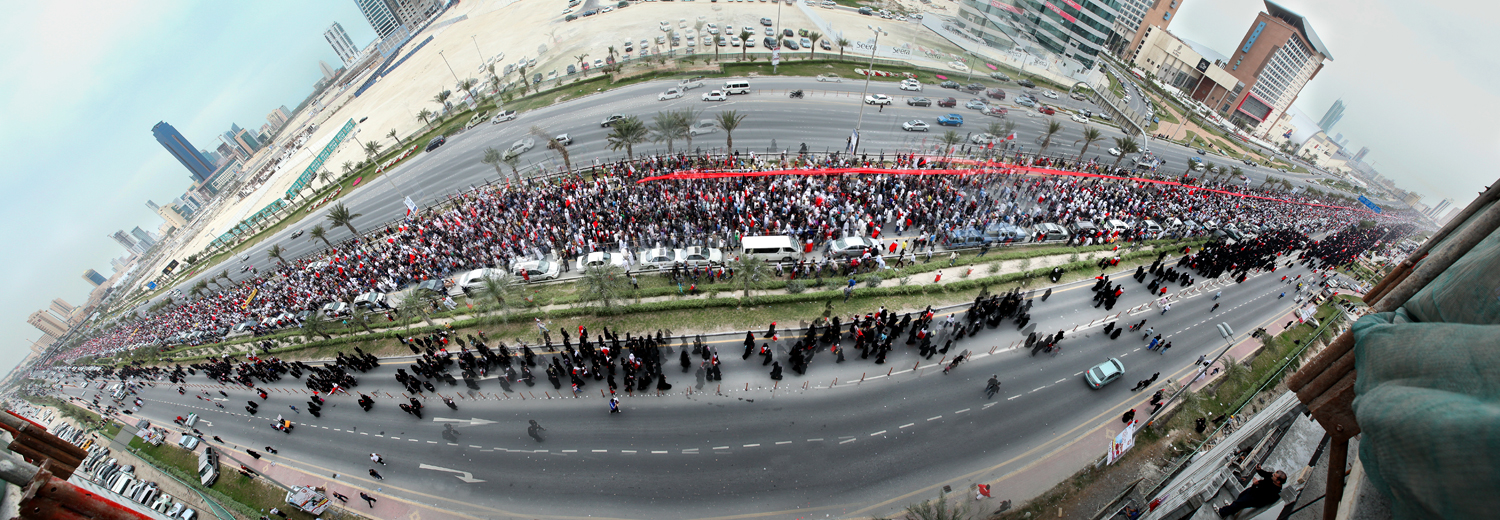
Panoramic image of the protest.

== Aftermath ==
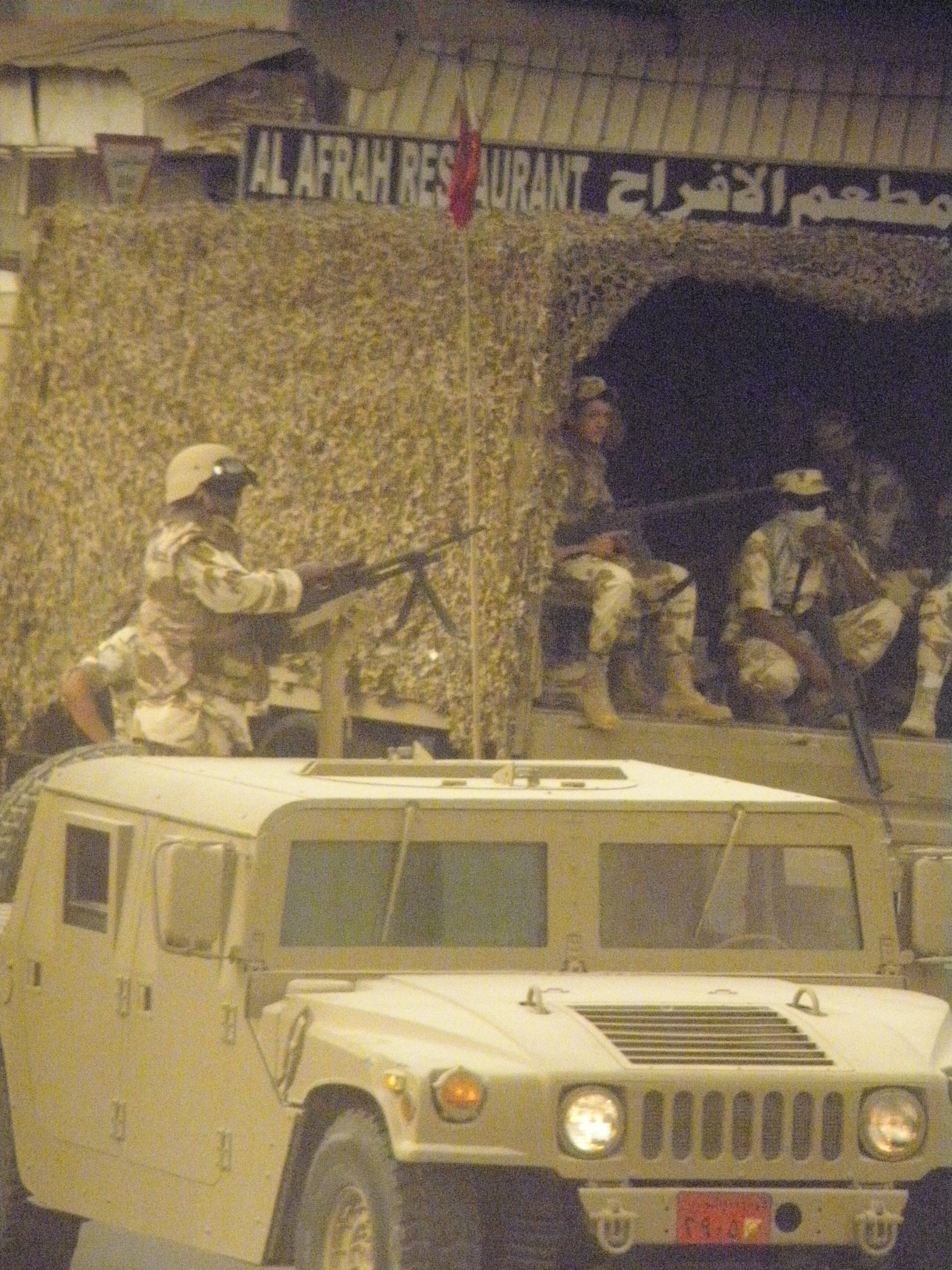
Bahrain army forces at a village entrance on 29 March

Peaceful protests, including one pro-government rally, continued throughout February and the first half of March, and drew tens of thousands of participants. On 8 March, unsatisfied by the government response, a coalition of three hard-line Shia groups called for the abdication of the monarchy and the establishment of a democratic republic through peaceful means. Al Wefaq continued to demand an elected government and a constitutional monarchy.

In the following days, protests intensified, moving to the Royal Court in Riffa, a royal palace in Safiriyya and finally blocking roads leading to the financial district in Manama. Security forces clashed with protesters using tear gas and rubber bullets, but police were overwhelmed by protesters. The government then requested help from neighboring countries, which sent about 1,500 security forces to assist the government. A state of emergency was declared and the government launched a crackdown campaign to put down the protests by force. The Pearl Roundabout, now cleared of protesters, was torn down by government and protesters found themselves pushed back into their villages. The government arrested over 1,000 protesters including leading opposition and rights activists (known as the Bahrain Thirteen) as well as sportsmen, academics, businessmen, doctors, engineers, journalists and teachers.

Despite the brutal crackdown, smaller-scale protests and clashes continued, mostly outside Manama's business districts. By April 2012, more than 80 people had died during the uprising.

== See also ==
- Day of Rage
- Bloody Thursday
- Bahrain: Shouting in the Dark

== External videos ==
- The march of Loyalty to Martyrs rally −1
- The march of Loyalty to Martyrs rally – 2
- The march of Loyalty to Martyrs rally – 3
