= Human rights in Bahrain =

Bahrain's record on human rights has been described by Human Rights Watch as "dismal", and having "deteriorated sharply in the latter half of 2010". Their subsequent report in 2020 noted that the human rights situation in the country had not improved.

The government of Bahrain have repressed the native Shia Muslim population. Torture and forced disappearances are common in Bahrain. The crackdown on protesters during the 2011 Arab Spring brought further human rights complaints, including the destruction of dozens of long-standing Shia mosques.

The Bahrain Independent Commission of Inquiry was established on 29 June 2011 by King Hamad bin Isa Al Khalifa to assess the incidents that occurred in the Kingdom during the period of unrest in Bahrain in February and March 2011 and the consequences of these events. The report was released on 23 November of that year and confirmed that there were some incidents of physical and psychological abuse on detainees. It has been criticized for not disclosing the names of individual perpetrators of abuses and extending accountability only to those who actively carried out human rights violations.

== Stateless people ==
There is a growing problem of stateless people, known as Bedoon, who are descendants of Iranians (especially ethnic Persians) who have lived in Bahrain for many decades. Most of Bahrain's stateless are Muslims, some of Bahrain's stateless are Christians.

In Bahrain, stateless people are denied the right to hold legal residency, are not allowed the right to travel abroad, buy houses, and to hold government jobs. They are also not allowed to own land, start a business and borrow loans. Recently, the Bahraini government issued regulations preventing them from sending their children to public schools and to receive free medical care. The stateless can also get deported at any time. Since the beginning of the 1980s, the Bahraini government has deported hundreds of Bedoon to Iran.

== Torture ==
Despite repeated government claims of improvement over the course of several years, Human Rights Watch claims that "torture is a regular part of the legal process in Bahrain."

According to a 2011 report by Human Rights Watch, between 2007 and 2009, the government regularly practiced torture and ill-treatment in interrogating security suspects. Although government spokesmen have issued denials, there is no evidence of criminal investigations and the government has not imposed disciplinary measures on the alleged perpetrators.

In 2011, Human Rights Watch claimed to have found evidence that protections for migrant workers have improved.

According to a report published by Reprieve and Bahrain Institute for Rights and Democracy, death sentences in Bahrain have increased by over 600% in the last ten years. The report also called the use of torture in Bahrain "endemic", revealing cases of forced confessions, electric shocks, beatings and attempted rape.

=== Hakeem al-Araibi held in Thailand ===
In November 2018, a Bahraini footballer Hakeem al-Araibi, who had been sentenced in absentia by Bahrain to 10 years in prison for vandalising a police station, was arrested upon arrival in Thailand with his wife for their honeymoon. The footballer, who was given refugee status by Australia in 2014, urged the Thailand authorities not to deport him to Bahrain as he was previously tortured in Bahrain for his political views.

He was kept in detention in Thailand while the Australian government and many international organisations and individuals lobbied for his release, until it was announced on 11 February 2019 by the Thai Office of the Attorney-General (OAG) that the extradition case against al-Araibi had been dropped by the criminal court at Bahrain's request. No reason was given by the foreign ministry, but the decision was made under Section 21 of the Prosecution Act, which allows for cases to be dropped if not in the public interest, and he would be released and allowed to return to Australia as soon as possible.

== Discrimination ==
=== Against ethnic Iranians ===
According to reports from 2013 and 2016 Bahrainis of an Iranian descent (Like Bushehri Lurs, and Achomis) that have a Shia background face systematic racism whereas Sunni Achomis do not. Some Sunni Achomis object to being classified as "Ajam" (a term usually used to refer to non-Arabs and especially people of Iranian ancestry in GCC countries and especially Achomis), and argue that this term only refers to people who migrated from Iran with a Shia background. The researcher pointed out that the linguistic and religious situation of the Sunni Persians in Bahrain is thorny, and that there is sometimes deliberate confusion between the "Huwala Arabs" and the "Sunni Persians/Achomis."

Iranians of Bahrain could quite often face discrimination and racism, and their loyalty is always questioned. Sectarian conflicts following the Islamic revolution of Iran, 2011 events, along with Islamic extremism, attributed to divisions among the Ajams of Bahrain.

While school students in Iran study Modern Standard (Formal) Arabic, Bahrainis of Iranian origins or Iranian ancestry cannot study Farsi, or any other Iranian languages, the suggestion was made between 1919-1923 and ignored. Citizenship laws in the Gulf Arab states currently mandate prolonged residency and a satisfactory proficiency in Arabic as prerequisites for applying for citizenship. This can indefinitely extend the stateless status of many Gulf Iranians, particularly those facing linguistic or other challenges. Furthermore, online content about the country's Persian minority is virtually absent, and media outlets are forbidden from using the Persian language or addressing Persian culture.

=== Against Baharna ===
Similarly, it is reported (in 2016) that the native Bahrainis (Baḥārna), who are Shias, also face similar prejudices simply due to their religious background.

== Sectarianism ==
=== Origin ===
A sizeable minority of the citizen population of Bahrain are Shia Muslims. The ruling Sunni Al Khalifa family, who were supported by the US, arrived in Bahrain from Qatar at the end of the eighteenth century. Shiites alleged that the Al Khalifa failed to gain legitimacy in Bahrain and established a system of "political apartheid based on racial, sectarian, and tribal discrimination." Vali Nasr, a leading expert on Middle East and Islamic world said "For Shi'ites, Sunni rule has been like living under apartheid".

=== Sectarian discrimination ===
According to The Christian Science Monitor, Bahrain is practicing "a form of sectarian apartheid by not allowing Shiites to hold key government posts or serve in the police or military. In fact, the security forces are staffed by Sunnis from Syria and Pakistan who also get fast-tracked to Bahraini citizenship, much to the displeasure of the indigenous Shiite population."

According to the Bahrain Centre for Human Rights, while the Shiites exceed 70% of the population, "they occupy less than 18% of total top jobs in government establishments. In several government ministries and corporations no Shiite is appointed in leading jobs."

Jobs in the police and armed forced are reserved for Sunni. Sunni Saudis are admitted to Bahrain as citizens to fill these jobs. Shiites and "some Sunnis of Persian origins", are banned from residing in the city of West Riffa, where only the Sunni Muslims are permitted to live.

The Bahraini government's successfully made systematic efforts to diminish the Shia majority by promotion of immigration of Sunni Muslims and granting them citizenship. According to Dr. Saeeid Shahabi, a London-based journalist,

On 28 April 2007, the lower house of Bahraini Parliament passed a law banning unmarried migrant workers from living in residential areas. To justify the law MP Nasser Fadhala, a close ally of the government said "bachelors also use these houses to make alcohol, run prostitute rings or to rape children and housemaids".

Sadiq Rahma, technical committee head, who is a member of Al Wefaq said:

The rules we are drawing up are designed to protect the rights of both the families and the Asian bachelors... these labourers often have habits which are difficult for families living nearby to tolerate... they come out of their homes half dressed, brew alcohol illegally in their homes, use prostitutes and make the neighbourhood dirty... these are poor people who often live in groups of 50 or more, crammed into one house or apartment," said Mr Rahma. "The rules also state that there must be at least one bathroom for every five people... there have also been cases in which young children have been sexually molested.

Bahrain Centre for Human Rights issued a press release condemning this decision as discriminatory and promoting negative racist attitudes towards migrant workers. Nabeel Rajab, then BCHR vice president, said:

It is appalling that Bahrain is willing to rest on the benefits of these people's hard work, and often their suffering, but that they refuse to live with them in equality and dignity. The solution is not to force migrant workers into ghettos, but to urge companies to improve living conditions for workers – and not to accommodate large numbers of workers in inadequate space, and to improve the standard of living for them.

There was a flurry of racially motivated hate messages sent to naturalized Bahrainis from developing countries after opposition political leaders alleged that immigration was tantamount to ‘cultural genocide’. In November 2006, Al Ayam published a collection of threats sent to naturalized citizens warning that they would have to 'choose between the suitcase and the coffin', promising 'Death and fire are your destiny' and another warned that the author hated all naturalized Bahrainis, "You are detested. You have taken from us, the sons of Bahrain, our homes, jobs and education opportunities. You will face the same destiny as the Egyptians in Iraq [after the end of the Iraq-Iran war]. It will be nails, hammers and a coffin. Your destiny is near."

According to Human Rights Watch, Bahrain's personal status law (Law 19/2009), adopted in 2009 and marriage, divorce, custody, and inheritance cases, applies only to Sunnis although women's groups believe that it should treat all citizens equally.

On 27 September 2017, Bahraini authorities attacked and took down many Ashura banners and slogans. Ashura, the tenth day of the Islamic year, is an event commemorated by Shias annually, marking the date that Husayn ibn Ali, the grandson of Muhammad, was killed in the Battle of Karbala. This is not the first time that Bahraini authorities havd attacked the commemoration of Ashura; rather, they do so on a yearly basis.

=== Criticism of Bahraini government ===
Among the journalists, authors and human rights activists who have criticized Bahrain's system as apartheid are Mansoor Al-Jamri, former editor of the Bahraini newspaper Al Wasat, the Voice of Bahrain, Saeed Shahabi of the Bahrain Freedom Movement, New York Times columnist Nicholas Kristof, Irshad Manji, Shibil Siddiqi, Ameen Izzadeen, Ben Cohen, Professor Staci Strobl, Ali Akbar Salehi, the Foreign Minister of Iran.

In 1996 the UK newspaper The Guardian stated that, "if Bahrain is to preserve its reputation as a financial and service center in the Gulf, then the government must begin to forge a new national consensus and end the apartheid against the Shi'ites".

In 1997, Joe Stork of Human Rights Watch said the apartheid practiced against the Shia by the government appeared to be "worsening."

In August 2017, United States Secretary of State Rex Tillerson spoke against the discrimination of Shias in Bahrain, saying, "Members of the Shia community there continue to report ongoing discrimination in government employment, education, and the justice system," and that "Bahrain must stop discriminating against the Shia communities." He also stated that "In Bahrain, the government continue to question, detain and arrest Shia clerics, community members and opposition politicians."

Bahraini human rights defender Nabeel Rajab was released from prison on 9 June 2020. He was detained in 2016 and then sentenced for five years in prison on peacefully expressing his views on the Bahraini government online. Human Rights Watch urged the government to release the human rights defenders, political activists, opposition leaders, and journalists who were unjustly imprisoned for peacefully expressing their opinions.

In April 2021, rights defender Abdulhadi Al-Khawaja not only turned 60 years old but also completed 10 years of unconditional imprisonment. The family members of Abdulhadi are concerned about his well-being due to his declining health condition during the COVID-19 pandemic. According to the report issued by Civicus, an international non-profit organization, Al-Khawaja has spent 10 years of unreasonable incarceration along with abuse and mistreatment at the hands of the prison authorities. He was arrested in 2011 for a critical stance against the government and for organizing protests that demanded political reforms during the 2011 Arab uprisings. Rights organizations are now calling for his prompt release.

Human rights groups reported on 9 April 2021 the detention of the family members of prominent political prisoners following their peaceful protests against their imprisonment, which included Mohammed Al-Daqqaq and his inmate on death row, Mohammed Ramadhan. The arrests were made during an event of suppression of protesters during a demonstration against the severe outbreak of coronavirus at the Jau Prison, where the political prisoners have been held.

According to Ricochet, independent journalism and crowdfunded media outlet, the largest prison in Bahrain, Jau, has an average cell measuring 3 by 3.4 meters which each house an average of 12 prisoners at a time, despite concerns regarding the coronavirus pandemic. Many of the inmates are political prisoners arrested for opposition against the government or protests during the Arab Spring movement. The conditions at the prison are reportedly dirty and unhygienic. However, the economical and geopolitical relations shared by Ottawa and Washington with Bahrain are apparently overshadowing the violation of human rights in the Gulf nation. When the relatives of the prisoners discovered that 3 Covid-positive cases had been detected at the prison, they took to the streets to protest against the continued imprisonment of the political prisoners. The event was followed by prisoners being beaten in their cells by authorities, as per Bahrain's National Institution for Human Rights.

In April 2021, the death of a Bahraini prisoner at the Jau prison due to COVID-19 led to protests from angry inmates who feared for their lives due to the lack of adequate medical facilities and treatment. As a response, prisoners at building 13 staged a sit-in which lasted for 10 days. The data provided by the Bahrain Institute for Rights and Democracy and reviewed by the Guardian stated that at least 138 inmates at the prison had been infected with COVID-19 since 22 March 2021.

The COVID-19 outbreak in Bahrain's main prison, Jau has left prisoners with poor living conditions as prison authorities continue to deliberately neglect medical needs. According to Americans for Democracy and Human Rights in Bahrain (ADHRB), a second outbreak at Jau began in mid-May’21, infecting at least 60%of the 255 political prisoners.

A 22-year-old Bahraini, Mustafa Abdul-Karim Khatam, was reported to be in a bad health condition, following torture inside Jau Prison. He was allegedly interrogated and tortured to submit to charges. Despite the worsened conditions, Khatam was denied any medical assistance or care, criticized by human rights organizations.

In July 2021, non-governmental organisation IFEX called upon the Bahraini government to immediately release prominent Bahraini human rights defender and academic Dr.Abduljalil AlSingace, who went on a hunger strike to protest against the degrading and punitive treatment he had been receiving from Jau Prison authorities.

On 22 August 2021, The Independent revealed that the UK government has been using British taxpayers’ money to secretly fund a Bahraini government institution, known as the National Intelligence Agency Ombudsman. The institution was accused of "whitewashing" the torture and rape of women's rights activists. The British government was condemned by Najah Yusuf and Ebtisam Al-Saegh, the two activists who were alleged to have been sexually assaulted by the Bahraini authorities.

On 24 September 2021, the Americans for Democracy and Human Rights in Bahrain (ADHRB) reported that a bipartisan group of the United States senators called on the Secretary of State Antony Blinken to press the Bahraini government to end human right abuses including, "arbitrary detention, torture, cruel and degrading treatment of prisoners, restrictions on freedom of the press, interference with peaceful assembly, and restrictions on political participation and religious practice".

In October 2021, the US Senate Appropriations Committee addressed the extensive human rights violations by the Bahraini government. The Committee expressed concerns over the "widespread use of arbitrary detention, torture, violation of due process, and unfair trials in Bahrain". They also pointed out at the intolerance towards free expression and suppression of peaceful dissent. The committee's legislation stated that Government of Bahrain should release the political prisoners, human rights activists and independent journalists without condition.

On 20 December 2021, 12 members of the European Parliament signed a joint letter to High Representative Josep Borrell, expressing grave concerns about the human rights violations in Bahrain. The letter, under the initiative of the European Center for Democracy and Human Rights (ECDHR), raised many questions regarding the measures taken by the European External Action Service (EEAS). The MEPs mentioned the situation of the imprisoned opposition leader, Hasan Mushaima, and prominent opposition activist Dr. Abduljalil Al-Singace, along with two European citizens, Abdulhadi al-Khawaja and Sheikh Mohammad Habib Al-Miqdad. The MEPs also requested in their letter to impose sanctions against members of the government of Bahrain responsible for the said violation of human rights.

On 14 January 2022, the Scottish National Party criticised the UK's relationship with Bahrain and accused the government of prioritizing trade deals over human rights abuses. In the House of Commons, SNP's Westminster human rights spokesman Brendan O'Hara stated that when it came to right and wrong, the Government's position on Bahrain shows it has "clearly picked which side they are on", citing the case of Dr. Al-Singace, who has suffered torture and sexual abuse at the hands of Bahraini security forces.

It was revealed in February 2022 that Bahrain used Israel's Pegasus spyware to hack into the phones of three individuals involved in political opposition. The targets included a prominent lawyer, an exiled Bahraini psychiatrist and a journalist. A separate investigation by the Pegasus Project revealed that 20 loyalists close to Bahrain's government, including two members of the royal family, were also listed in the leaked database of numbers targeted or hacked by NSO. The mobile phone of a US state department official, who was stationed in Bahrain at the time of her selection, also appears on the leaked database.

On 5 April 2022, a report by Human Rights Watch claimed that Bahrain failed to fulfil an undertaking it pledged at the Human Rights Council's Universal Periodic Review in 2008. The Kingdom had pledged that it "is fully committed to supporting non-governmental organizations through legal and other instruments". Instead, it shut down almost all NGOs that were critical of the regime. HRW said independent media and foreign journalists rarely have access to the country. With abusive restrictions on freedom of expression, Bahrain arbitrarily imprisons human rights defenders and those who took part in protests. The repressive Kingdom was asked to permit an access for foreign journalists and human rights organizations into the country.

On 12 April 2022, Americans for Democracy & Human Rights in Bahrain (ADHRB) criticized relations of the UK and US with Bahrain, stating that the two nations turned a blind-eye towards the Arab nation's legalization of systematic repression and human rights violations. The US and UK were condemned for continuing their business-as-usual with Bahrain and for ignoring the torture, unfair trials, and killing of protesters and critics of the government. ADHRB stated that the futile political reforms enacted by the Bahraini government to improve the country's human rights situation have covered for both the US and the UK to continue their political relations with the Arab nation, while neglecting the country's human rights violations.

On 10 October 2022, the Human Rights Watch and the Bahrain Institute for Rights and Democracy released a joint report stating that Bahraini courts routinely violated defendants’ rights to fair trials, and sentenced defendants to death following manifestly unfair trials, based primarily on confessions allegedly coerced through torture. Since 2011, courts in Bahrain have sentenced 51 people to death, and the state has executed six since the end of a de facto moratorium on executions in 2017. As of June 2022, 26 men were on death row, and all have exhausted their appeals.

In August 2023, Bahrain's government used political isolation laws to curb activists and former opposition members from public participation, resulting in rights abuses and stifled democracy, as per a report by Human Rights Watch. The laws, enacted in 2018, restricted running for parliament and serving on civic boards, prompting criticism and calls for their repeal to restore civil rights.

=== Calls for an election boycott ===
In 2010 the Al-Wafa Islamic Movement, Haq Movement and Bahrain Freedom Movement called for a boycott of the 23 October election to the Bahraini Council of Representatives on the grounds that participation would be "tantamount to accepting the unjust sectarian apartheid system."

=== Silencing of Shia clerics ===
On 19 August 2015, Bahraini authorities arrested Shia cleric and former MP Sheikh Hassan Isa. His arrest on false charges was said to be a reprisal of the Bahraini government against him, and it was reported that the measures taken against Sheikh Isa, who was innocent, violated national and international law.

On 20 June 2016, Ayatullah Sheikh Isa Qassim was stripped of his nationality. As a result, some people protested the Bahraini government's act of doing this by holding a sit-in outside the home of the Ayatullah. On 23 May 2017, however, Bahraini security forces attack the sit-in. As a result of the attack, five people died, dozens of people were injured, and hundreds of people were arrested. The Ayatullah was also placed under house arrest.

In August 2017, Bahraini authorities arrested Shia cleric Sayed Mohieldin Al-Mashaal. Sayed Al-Mashaal had previously been harassed by the Bahraini authorities for about 5 years.

Also in August 2017, around the three-month anniversary of Ayatullah Sheikh Isa Qassim's house arrest, it was reported that Bahraini authorities were placing concrete barriers around his house.

On 1 November 2017, Bahrain imposed charges against Sheikh Ali Salman, Hassan Sultan, and Ali al-Aswad because of their efforts for reform through peaceful means. In March 2018, Bahrain refused to grant Bahraini citizenship to the daughter of Sheikh Ali Salman, a prominent Shia and opposition leader in Bahrain. This was Bahrain's retribution for the imprisoned Shiekh's peaceful attempts for reform in the country.

In late April 2018, after the Bahraini monarch commuted the death sentences of four men who had been tried by Bahrain's military court, four Shia sheikhs released a statement saying that they hoped that such steps would be "extended to the rest of those sentenced [to death]." The statement also called for a "homeland of love, tolerance, justice, and prosperity." In response, Bahrain's interior ministry threatened the sheikhs with "legal action."

=== Ban on Friday prayers ===
Since 20 June 2016, Bahrain has prevented the leader of Friday prayers of Diraz, a village of about 30,000 people, from entering.

== Bahraini uprising (2011–present) ==
In February 2011, the tensions between the Sunni ruling minority and the Shi'a majority spilled over into street protests which was violently suppressed by police forces, resulting in multiple civilian deaths. McClatchy Newspapers/csmonitor.com reported that as of mid-May 2011,

Authorities have held secret trials where protesters have been sentenced to death, arrested prominent mainstream opposition politicians, jailed nurses and doctors who treated injured protesters, seized the health care system that had been run primarily by Shiites, fired 1,000 Shiite professionals and canceled their pensions, detained students and teachers who took part in the protests, beat and arrested journalists, and forced the closure of the only opposition newspaper.

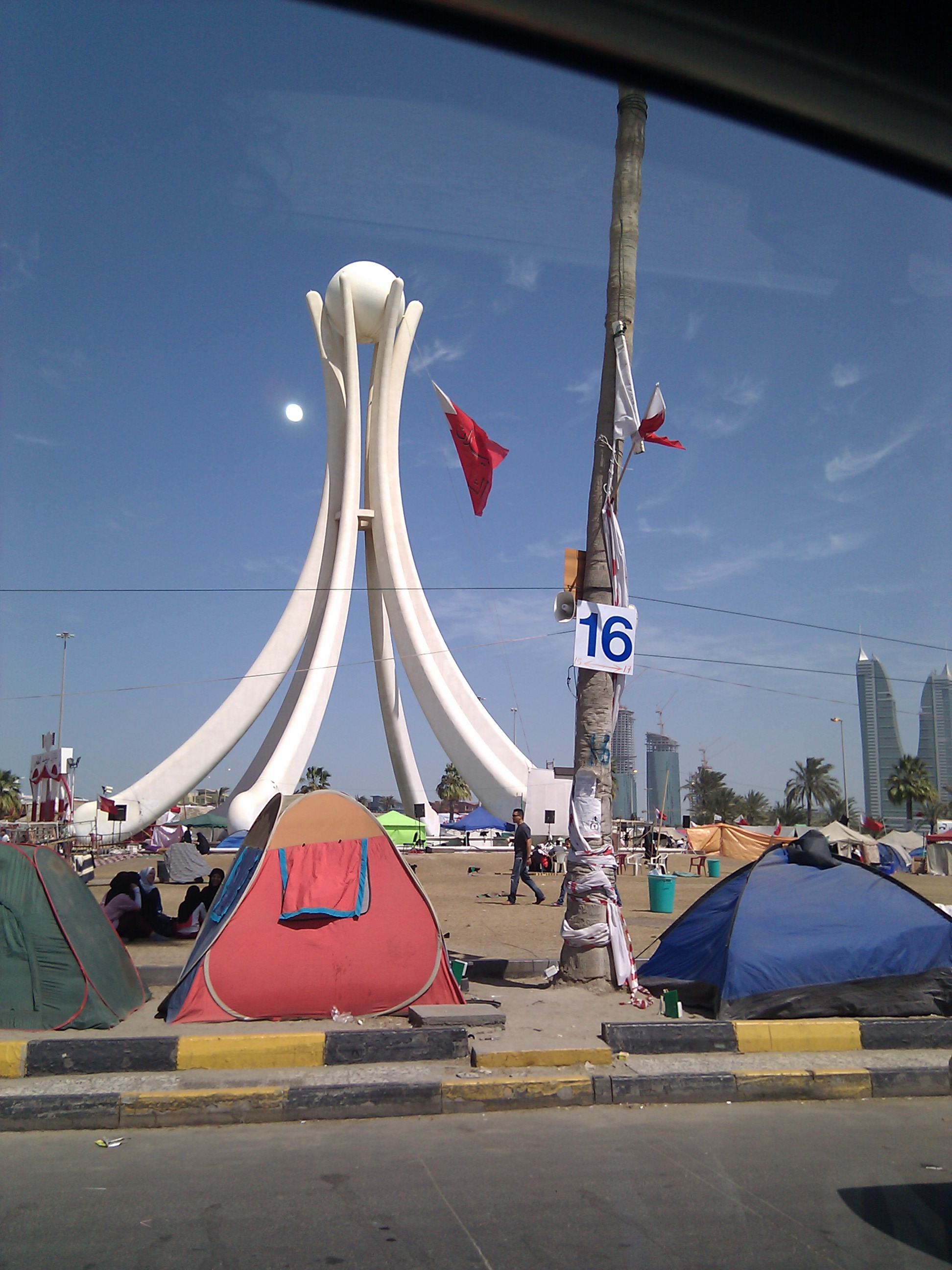
Protesters at the Pearl Roundabout just before it was demolished.

Physicians for Human Rights reported that during the 2011 uprising the Bahraini government initiated systematic and targeted attacks against medical personnel who had witnessed government atrocities while treating civilian protesters. In a report titled Do No Harm: A Call for Bahrain to End Systematic Attacks on Doctors and Patients, released in April 2011, Physicians for Human Rights documented violations of medical neutrality including the beating, abuse, and threatening of Shi'a physicians at Salmaniya Hospital; government security forces stealing ambulances and posing as medics; the militarization of hospitals and clinics, thus obstructing medical care; and rampant fear that prevented patients from seeking urgent medical treatment. Other key findings in the report included the use of excessive force against unarmed civilians and violent assaults on civilian detainees by government authorities and security forces.

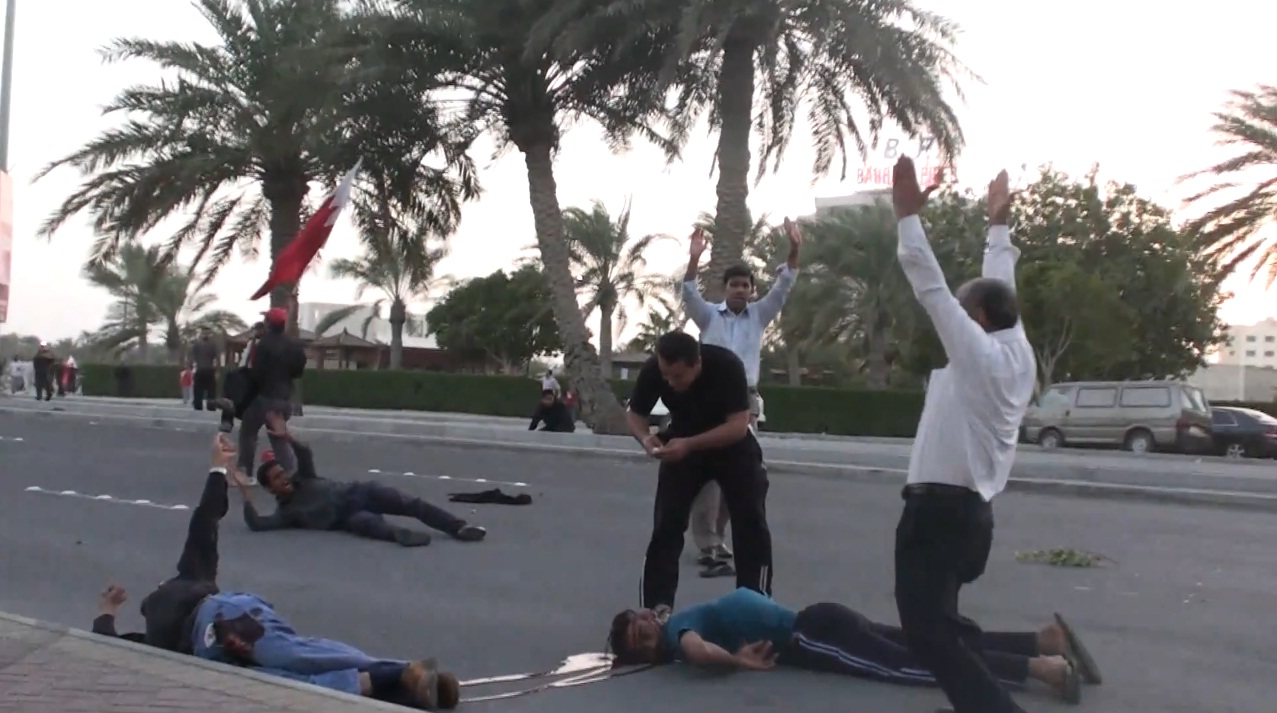
Bahraini protesters shot by military, 2011

In May 2011, Richard Sollom, deputy director of Physicians for Human Rights, testified before the Tom Lantos Human Rights Commission, a bipartisan caucus of the US House of Representatives, at a hearing on Bahrain. He reported the abuses documented by Physicians for Human Rights and called upon Congress to take a stronger stance against human rights violations in Bahrain.

An estimated 1000 Bahrainis have been detained since the uprising and Bahraini and international human rights groups have documented hundreds of cases of torture and abuse of Shia detainees. According to csmonitor.org, the government has gone beyond the crushing of political dissent to what "appears" to be an attempt to "psychologically humiliating the island's Shiite majority into silent submission."

The Bahrain Independent Commission of Inquiry was established on 29 June 2011 by King Hamad bin Isa Al Khalifa to assess the incidents that occurred in the Kingdom during the period of unrest in February and March 2011 and the consequences of these events. The report was released on 23 November and confirmed the Bahraini government's use of torture and other forms of physical and psychological abuse on detainees. It has been criticized for not disclosing the names of individual perpetrators of abuses and extending accountability only to those who actively carried out human rights violations.

On 1 April 2022, the Amnesty International reported that Bahraini human rights defender, Abdulhadi al-Khawaja was being denied medical treatment for suspected glaucoma, as a result of the injuries he sustained due to torture in 2011, including a broken jaw. After spending over a decade in wrongful imprisonment and being subjected to physical, psychological and sexual torture, Al-Khawaja suffered from chronic pain and required an additional surgery. However, his medical treatment was stopped due to his activism inside the prison in February 2022. His daughter also reported that during January, Al-Khawaja had to wait outside the hospital for three hours, before he was brought back to the prison without seeing the doctor.

An academic, Abduljalil al-Singace was arrested by the Bahraini authorities and sentenced to prison for life for his role in the 2011 uprisings. Following his arrest, he was subjected to beatings at night for two months and was kept in solitary confinement. He has been subjected to torture and ill-treatment, where he was forced to "stand on one leg for prolonged periods", tortured by pushing his crutch "into his genitals" and was "threatened him with rape and made sexually explicit comments about his wife and his daughter". In July 2021, al-Singace went on a hunger strike in protest, after the prison authorities confiscated his research work of four years. He refused to take solid food and survived on liquids and vitamins. In July 2022, al-Singace announced to further abstain from taking salts that helped in stabilizing his health condition. Amnesty International called on the Bahraini authorities to "immediately and unconditionally release” him, hand over his work to his family and to “ensure he receives the medication" required.

=== Conviction of medical workers ===
A security court handed down what have been described as "harsh sentences" to 20 Bahraini medical workers in September 2011. The accused workers, who all worked at the Salminaya Medical Center, were given prison terms ranging from 5–15 years based on government claims that the medical workers had taken over the hospital and used it for antigovernment activity.

After the sentences were condemned by United Nations secretary Ban Ki-moon and international human rights groups such as Physicians for Human Rights, Bahraini judicial authorities nullified the convictions and ordered retrials in civilian court.

In January 2012, Richard Sollom, deputy director of Physicians for Human Rights, was denied entry to Bahrain, where he had travelled to monitor the appellate court trial of the 20 previously sentenced medics. Bahrain had promised greater transparency in the wake of an international investigation into the human rights violations that occurred during the uprising, yet refused to allow Sollom, who carried a valid entry visa, to view the trial or even enter the country.

== Civil and political rights ==
Parliamentary and municipal elections take place every four years, since the restoration of elections in 2002, when women were also given the vote for the first time as part of reforms by King Hamad. Bahrain has a bicameral legislature with the lower chamber of parliament, the (Council of Representatives of Bahrain), elected by universal suffrage, and the upper chamber, the (Shura Council), appointed directly by the King. Those represented in the Shura Council include members of Bahrain's Christian and Jewish communities.

The Prime Minister and government ministers are not elected. They are appointed directly by the King, but ministers can be removed by parliamentary no-confidence votes. The current Prime Minister, Khalifah ibn Sulman Al Khalifah, is the King's paternal uncle and has been in office since 1970. Twelve of the twenty-three cabinet ministers appointed in November 2006 are members of the Al Khalifa royal family.

Bahrain has a complex civil society, which pre-dates the reforms introduced by King Hamad, and has its roots in the emergence of the labour movement and the development of an educated middle class in the 1930s. According to a 2006 study on civil society in Bahrain by the European University Institute, Voices in Parliament, Debates in Majalis, Banners on the Street: Avenues of Political Participation in Bahrain:

Generally, civil society has thriven, at least numerically. Bahrain's NGOs are fragmented – many NGOs are really a spin-off of a political organisation and/or can draw only a narrow ethnic-sectarian segment to their activities. Generally the more elitist the NGO, the less narrowly defined its constituency in sectarian terms: Sectarianism does not play a role in many of the ‘arty’ clubs.

Contrary to views commonly held on Gulf states’ societies, Bahrain's society offers a complex matrix of interlinking social institutions, understood in a broader anthropological sense. These can in varying degrees be mobilised for political ends.

Catering to the urban elites of both sects, the first clubs were opened in Manama earlier than in the rest of the Gulf region. Namely, the Uruba Club to which most prominent liberals are a member was founded in the early 1930s.

Other venues for political and social interactions are obviously the headquarters of political societies. Several of these also have regular weekly or monthly lecture days. Many headquarters of NGOs and trade unions are located very close to each other, since the king had donated a block of apartments for that purpose in 2001.

For the average politically active Bahraini, there are usually a number of outlets according to the European University Institute:

A typical male Bahraini with political interests has multiple affiliations: he is a member of a political society, has joined two or three NGOS in the first reform euphoria (related to human rights, women, environment), has been (since he entered his professional life) a member of a professional association. If Shiite, he attends ma’atim at least for holidays, and is involved in some charity, religious or through a local fund. It's quite likely he is a regular to a majlis, the likelihood even increasing in case he is Sunni with tribal affiliations.

The government's moves to join international treaties protecting human rights have often been opposed by parliament. The initial attempt to get parliamentary ratification of the Optional Protocol to the International Covenant on Civil and Political Rights was blocked in February 2006 on the grounds that leading MPs said contradicted Islamic laws. Al Menbar Bloc president Dr Salah Abdulrahman complained that the covenant would allow citizens to change religions without any restrictions, noting "This means that Muslims could convert to another religion, something against the Islamic law, since those who do so should be beheaded," he said. "Under the convention, women have the right to marry without their father's consent, while in Islam they should do so if she was a virgin".

It was not until June 2006 that a second attempt was made to ratify the country's accession to the Covenant, meaning that Bahrain did not formally accede to the treaty until 20 September 2006.

Civil society has been prominent in supporting specific legislation promoting human rights through parliament. One recent campaign is the call for Bahrain's government to ratify the Rome Statute of the International Criminal Court. It is being led by the Bahrain-branch of the Coalition for the International Criminal Court and wants the government to transfer the draft bill on ratification to parliament at the earliest. The Bahraini Coalition for the ICC is headed by Nasser Burdestani (who is also the head of the Bahrain-branch of Amnesty International), who commented:

"The fact that we in Bahrain do not suffer from such grave crimes that are within the court's jurisdiction should facilitate the process of ratification without any reservations."

Citing the role that Bahrain plays in the region and the domino effect, the Coalition for the International Criminal Court Co-ordinator for the Middle East and North Africa, Amal Basha, said Bahrain's ratification could have a significant impact among the neighbouring Persian Gulf countries: "We believe that Bahrain could serve as a real catalyst by ratifying as soon as possible," she said. "It would provide a serious boost to the growing world movement to ensure accountability for the worst violations of international human rights and humanitarian law."

On 25 November 2020, The Guardian reported that three political prisoners, who claimed to have been victims of human rights abuses in Bahrain, appealed Lewis Hamilton to use his position as F1's champion to highlight the reality of their dilemma to the world. In a letter to Hamilton, they also praised his commitment to pursuing equality, anti-racism and human rights causes.

Since the 2011 uprising, many Bahrainis have repeatedly protested against the hosting of the Formula 1 Grand Prix, while hundreds of political prisoners had been piled up and tortured in prisons of Bahrain. In 2012, Salah Abbas was murdered by the Bahraini police and his body was found a day before the Grand Prix. Similarly, in 2017, Najah Yusuf was arrested, tortured and sexually assaulted by the Bahraini authorities for criticizing the Bahrain Grand Prix on social media.

On 4 October 2021, according to a report by Americans for Democracy and Human Rights in Bahrain (ADHRB), four French MPs Gérard Leseul, Jean-Christophe Lagarde, Isabelle Rauch, and Dominique Potier urged France's foreign minister to speak out over the deteriorating human rights situation in Bahrain, especially the imprisonment of political opponents.

Bahraini's showed up to the November 2022 elections to vote for a meaningful change, only to find out that the opposition was banned, as per rights groups. Despite 330+ candidates, which included a record 73 women competing in the elections, the elections ended up being an unfair event with all of them being banned from competing. Amnesty International claimed that the election was held in an "environment of political repression".

=== Citizenship rights ===
On the weekend of 31 January/1 February 2015, 72 Bahraini citizens, including "about 50 journalists, bloggers, religious figures, doctors, political and human rights activists" and about 20 people "suspected of or known to have left Bahrain to join ISIS in Iraq and Syria", had their citizenships revoked. The citizenship revocations were discussed on the newly launched al-Arab News Channel on 1 February.

According to Human Rights Watch annual report 2016, Bahraini authorities can revoke the citizenship of any person who involved in helping a hostile state or causing harm to the interests of the kingdom. In January, the minister of interior revoked the citizenship of 72, including former parliamentarians and politicians, claiming that they had been involved in "illegal acts," including "inciting and advocating regime change through illegal means".

=== Death penalty ===
In 2017, Bahrain ended its moratorium on the use of the death penalty, and by 2020 had executed six people. As of 2021, there are 27 individuals on death row in the country, with 25 deemed at "imminent risk" of execution according to the Bahrain Institute for Rights and Democracy.

A report by the Human Rights Watch published in October 2022 claimed that despite a de facto moratorium on executions put in place in 2017, executions have continued to take place in Bahrain. Approximately, 51 people were sentenced to death who had exhausted their appeals, even though the Bahraini law is controlled by King Hamad bin Isa Al Khalifa. It was possible for the King to ratify the sentences or grant pardons to those sentenced. The report claimed that the Bahraini courts failed on multiple levels to investigate reports of torture or abuse used as a means to coerce confessions as evidence for death sentencing, prohibited under Article 7 of the International Covenant on Civil and Political Rights (ICCPR).

== Freedom of speech ==
The government claims that the press is free. However, the Penal Code of 1976, still active today, has been widely criticized by local and international human rights bodies for granting the regime widespread powers to suppress dissent. Human Rights Watch noted in 2004 that the Penal Code gives the government "wide latitude to suppress public criticism" and that it "has provisions that contradict international human rights standards". Amnesty International in 2004 stated the Code can be used "as a justification to restrict freedom of expression. The organization reiterates its call for the Code to be reviewed as soon a possible to ensure compliance with international human rights standards."

According to Human Rights Watch 2011 country report and the international press, freedom of the press both in print and on web sites is severely restricted, with websites blocked, journalists allegedly tortured and editors fired.

As of 2017, Human Rights Watch said Bahraini authorities are apparently targeting the family members of a prominent Bahraini activist, Sayed al-Wadaei, in retaliation for his human rights work. They have detained both his brother-in-law and his mother-in-law. Sayed has accused Bahraini authorities of serious human rights abuses. Since having forced Sayed into exile in Britain, authorities have resorted to threatening and harassing his wife, infant son, and relatives with torture.

According to Amnesty international report on the human rights situation in Bahrain during 2016, Authorities continued imposing restrictions on the rights to freedom of expression and association and continued to curtail the right to peaceful assembly. The international organization said authorities detained several activists and banned others from travelling abroad. Authorities also continued its policy in removing opponents their citizenship.

During the 2017 Qatar diplomatic crisis, Bahrain banned any expression of sympathy towards Qatar. Violators will face a fine and jail term up to five years.

On 11 July 2020, the UK foreign office was urged to intervene to stop the execution of Mohammed Ramadan and Husain Moosa, two Bahraini pro-democracy activists who were given death sentence by a Bahrain court, despite claims of confessions extracted through torture.

In January 2021, three deputies of the Dáil Éireann, Niall Collins, Joan Collins, and Michael Creed questioned the Irish Foreign Minister Simon Coveney over the human rights violations in Bahrain. They called for the Irish authorities to put efforts into the release of Bahrain's opposition political party leader, Hassan Mushaima. In response to the deputies, Coveney expressed serious concerns over the violations of freedom of speech in Manama, and urged the regime to release Mushaima.

On 13 December 2021, the Human Rights Watch demanded that on the occasion of Bahrain National Day, 16 December 2021, authorities use the customary pardon to free everyone imprisoned for exercising freedom of expression and association. The most prominent opposition leaders, including human rights defenders, and journalists, have been behind bars for more than a decade for their role in the 2011 pro-democracy protests. According to the reports, Bahrain has one of the highest incarceration rates per capita in the Middle East.

On 6 March 2023, Ebrahim Al-Mannai posted on Twitter, urging the Bahraini government to reform its parliament if they wanted to showcase it internationally. Shortly after, he and three others were arrested for their social media activity. On 9 March, Bahrain's Public Prosecutor's Office released a statement on Instagram, explaining that the arrests were for "misusing social media platforms." Al-Mannai has since been released, but the current situation of the other three individuals remains uncertain.

=== Self-Censorship Among Internet Users in Bahrain ===
Internet users in Bahrain exhibit significant self-censorship due to fears of government reprisal. Many opt to use pseudonyms on platforms such as Twitter, online forums, and comment sections to avoid being targeted by authorities. Others prefer sharing content privately on social media rather than posting publicly. Even opposition news outlets based outside the country rarely disclose the identities of their editors. Investigations into users' online activities have also been conducted in workplaces and universities.

Activists often cease tweeting following detentions and interrogations. Those who return to Twitter after being detained tend to steer clear of controversial topics, such as criticism of the king or other issues flagged by the Ministry of Interior (MOI). In May 2019, exiled journalist Adel Marzooq reported losing 180 followers on Twitter shortly after the MOI labeled his account as malicious and warned users not to follow or promote his messages. Similarly, tweets about royal family members’ alleged appropriation of public land in Arad ceased after several users received summonses in April 2019.

By 2019, self-censorship on Twitter had reached extreme levels, with many users avoiding discussions beyond sports, lifestyle topics, or political views aligned with the regime. Bahraini satirical writer Mohsen Alsaffar humorously remarked in April 2019 that before posting a tweet, one must first consult a lawyer to verify its legality, a cleric to confirm its religious validity, a diplomat to ensure it aligns with international norms, a security expert to avoid accusations of supporting terrorism, and an economist to ensure it does not destabilize the country's economy.

=== Blasphemy Laws ===
Blasphemy is considered a crime in Bahrain. Articles 309 and 310 of the penal code criminalize "any method of expression" against a religious community (309), or ridiculing religious beliefs (310):

"a punishment for a period not exceeding one year or a fine not exceeding BD 100 shall be inflicted upon any person who commits an offence by any method of expression against one of the recognized religious communities or ridicules the rituals thereof".

The press and publications law prohibits anti-Islamic media, and mandates imprisonment for "exposing the state's official religion for offense and criticism." The law states that "any publication that prejudices the ruling system of the country and its official religion, public morals or any faith in a manner likely to disturb the peace, can be banned from publication by a ministerial order." The law allows the production and distribution of religious media and publications of minority groups, under condition that they do not criticize Islam.

In September 2022, Sheikh Abdul Rahman bin Mohammed bin Rashid Al Khalifa, Chairman of the Supreme Council for Islamic Affairs in Bahrain, said during his participation in Bashkortostan's celebrations of the 11th anniversary of the introduction of Islam: "There is no doubt that you have followed and are following with pride the pioneering role of Muslim peoples and major Islamic institutions around the world in confronting campaigns to spread atheism and moral decay and threaten families, communities and values."

==== Known cases ====
In August, 2012, a Bahraini court sentenced a man (name unknown) to two years in prison for making insulting comments about one of the Prophet Mohammad's wives. The man reportedly insulted Aisha in comments online.

In March 2015 the Lebanese feminist poet and journalist Joumana Haddad was banned from taking part in a cultural event in Bahrain, due to accusations that she would promote atheism and target Islamic values.

In 2016, a Bahraini court sentenced Ibrahim Sharif, a founding member of the secular National Democratic Action Society (Waed) party, to one year in prison on the charge of "inciting hatred" for making a pro-democracy speech. After his release, in March 2019 Sharif was sentenced to 6 months in prison for tweeting criticism of Sudan's president.

In November 2016, a Bahraini court sentenced journalist and blogger Faisal Hayyat under Article 309 of the penal code to 3 months in prison for a tweet deemed to have insulted a "religious symbol and group."

In June 2019, Shia Jaafari cleric Ahmed Abdulaziz Al Madhiwas accused of ‘insulting the companions of the Prophet Muhammad’ during a sermon and was prosecuted under Article 310 of the penal code. Al Madhi is one of dozens of Jaafari religious figures to be harassed and jailed by Bahraini authorities for similar charges.

In October 2020, an unidentified female Bahraini citizen who mocked Islamic scripture on Twitter, was reported which got her subsequently arrested on claims of "blasphemy and defamation of Islam and other religions on social media".

According to the MOI, during the year, the ministry investigated 26 individuals for defamation of religions, a charge usually stemming from statements made during sermons, and the government prosecuted six of them for inciting religious hatred and sectarianism. Courts convicted two of the six, but authorities did not announce their sentences. The other four cases remained ongoing at year's end. The government also prosecuted 11 of the 26 individuals for "despising other religions" and convicted one person of blasphemy.

On 23 May, the MOI Anti-Cyber Crime Directorate arrested a Sunni woman and charged her with inciting sectarian hatred. According to the government, the woman said Shia Muslims were responsible for the spread of COVID-19. She appeared before the criminal court on 27 May. At year's end, there was no further information available on the disposition of her case. (Note: This, however, falls more into the category of Article 309 of the penal code.)

According to media, on 9 December, the MOI announced it had arrested a male citizen for blasphemy and for inciting immoral activities on social media. The MOI referred the case to the public prosecutor, and it remained pending at year's end.

In 2023, Jalal al-Qassab, 60, and Redha Rajab, 67, were imprisoned after their final appeals were rejected. Both men, members of the Bahraini cultural association Al-Tajdeed (lit: reformation; referring to the reformation of Islam), were sentenced to one year in prison and fined for "mocking" Islamic beliefs. Their charges stemmed from YouTube videos where Al-Qassab questioned certain Quranic verses. Bahraini authorities accused them of violating the penal code by offending religious sects and symbols. The court's decision highlights tensions between Bahrain's penal code and its commitments to international human rights law, particularly the right to freedom of belief and expression. Prominent Shia clerics have been the most openly hostile to the organisation, denouncing its work as blasphemy and calling for Al-Tajdeed members to be ostracised.

In October 2023, an Asian was reportedly arrested for posting tweets considered insulting to Islam.

On 20 July 2024, two people were arrested and summoned on claims of religious blasphemy.

== Information Control ==
Activists in Bahrain heavily depend on digital platforms, especially social media, to highlight protests and human rights violations. However, due to the risk of arrest, prosecution, and other repercussions, many users are cautious about engaging in political discussions online. Authorities have also blocked certain tools used for mobilization and campaigning, such as Telegram.

=== Internet Censorship ===
A Bahraini website blocked

Internet censorship in Bahrain is classified as pervasive in the political and social areas, as substantial in Internet tools, and as selective in conflict/security by the OpenNet Initiative in August 2009. Bahrain was placed on Reporters Without Borders' list of Internet Enemies in 2012.

On 5 January 2009 the Ministry of Culture and Information issued an order (Resolution No 1 of 2009) pursuant to the Telecommunications Law and Press and Publications Law of Bahrain that regulates the blocking and unblocking of websites. This resolution requires all ISPs – among other things – to procure and install a website blocking software solution chosen by the Ministry. The Telecommunications Regulatory Authority ("TRA") assisted the Ministry of Culture and Information in the execution of the said Resolution by coordinating the procurement of the unified website blocking software solution. This software solution is operated solely by the Ministry of Information and Culture and neither the TRA nor ISPs have any control over sites that are blocked or unblocked.

Internet censorship in Bahrain applies to anything that the Bahraini government deems inappropriate; this includes but is not limited to: political websites, independent journalism, pornographic websites, and more.

The internet is a primary source of news and information for many Bahrainis, with platforms like Twitter and Facebook serving as key outlets. However, only media organizations based outside Bahrain can report on local political matters without facing restrictions. Many independent, foreign-based news websites are blocked within the country.

Despite the government's tight grip on information, opposition websites and foreign news outlets based outside Bahrain still attract traffic from users inside the country who bypass restrictions using proxy servers, dynamic IP addresses, and VPN applications. The government had previously blocked access to tools like Google Translate and Google cached pages that could help users circumvent these blocks, but these services became accessible again in May 2019.

Censorship in Bahrain intensified following the prodemocracy protests of 2011, where online media played a pivotal role. Since then, strict controls on digital content have been maintained. Political content is widely restricted, though platforms such as YouTube, Facebook, Twitter, and international blog-hosting services remain accessible. However, several messaging and livestreaming applications have been blocked by authorities.

A 2015 report revealed that over 85 percent of Bahraini websites are hosted outside the country, despite Bahrain's advanced internet infrastructure. Hosting websites abroad makes them less susceptible to government takedown requests, allowing them to remain accessible via censorship circumvention tools.

In August 2016, Bahrain's Telecommunications Regulatory Authority (TRA) mandated all telecommunications companies to implement a centralized website-blocking system managed by the TRA. This directive was linked to a US$1.2 million contract with Canadian company **Netsweeper** for the development of a national website filtering solution. Netsweeper has since been identified on nine Bahraini internet service providers (ISPs) and is known to filter political content on at least one.

In May 2017, authorities blocked several Qatari news websites, including Al-Jazeera, Al-Sharq, and Al-Raya, following Bahrain's severance of diplomatic ties with Qatar alongside Egypt, Saudi Arabia, and the UAE. Previously, in June 2016, the popular communication app Telegram was banned. Telegram was widely used by independent media, opposition groups, and activists. The app and its associated website remained blocked at the end of the reported period. Other blocked sites include the Arab Network for Human Rights Information (ANHRI), the Bahrain Center for Human Rights (BCHR), and the London-based newspaper Al-Quds Al-Araby. Additionally, Bahrain Mirror, a prominent news site, remains inaccessible.

In December 2018, the website of Awal Online, an independent Bahraini news outlet, was blocked just a month after its launch. The anonymous editors of the platform attributed the blockage to critical reporting on a long-serving minister. In March 2019, their Twitter account was temporarily suspended.

Livestreaming platforms like Ustream and Bambuser, which were widely used during the 2011 protests, also continue to be blocked. According to a crowdsourced list from August 2018, 39 percent of the 367 blocked websites were categorized as political, while 23 percent were related to tools for bypassing censorship, such as anonymizers and web proxies.

=== Blocking Policies ===
The process for blocking websites in Bahrain is opaque, with multiple state entities, including the Ministry of Information Affairs (MIA) and the Ministry of Interior (MOI), authorized to block websites without requiring a court order. The MIA blocks websites under articles 19 and 20 of the Press Rules and Regulations, which prohibit content deemed to "instigate hatred of the political regime, encroach on the state's official religion, breach ethics, jeopardize public peace, or address prohibited topics." Additionally, article 70 criminalizes the publication of false news under the same law.

Authorities routinely issue updated lists of blocked websites to internet service providers (ISPs), instructing them to "prohibit any means that allow access to blocked sites." ISPs risk having their licenses revoked by the Telecommunications Regulatory Authority (TRA) if they fail to comply with these orders. However, the list of blocked websites is not made publicly available, and administrators of blocked websites are not notified or given reasons for the bans. When users attempt to access blocked websites, they are met with a generic message stating that the site has been "blocked for violating regulations and laws of the Kingdom of Bahrain." A link for submitting unblocking requests redirects to an error page.

There are no formal regulations governing an appeals process for content restrictions. In the absence of published blocking orders, website administrators face significant challenges in appealing such decisions through the court system. According to a 2009 MIA directive, no blocked website can be reinstated without explicit approval from the information minister.

Website administrators may also be held legally responsible for user-generated content, including alleged libel. In February 2016, the Interior Ministry announced that administrators of WhatsApp groups could be held accountable for spreading false news if they fail to report incidents occurring within their groups. Spreading false news that endangers national security or public order is considered a criminal offense and is punishable by up to two years in prison.

=== Content Removal ===
In March 2019, Bahrain's Ministry of Housing deleted several videos from its Instagram account featuring the Minister of Housing. In the videos, the minister argued that a small housing unit is only considered small if people perceive it as such. The videos went viral, attracting widespread sarcasm and criticism, prompting their removal.

Recordings of Shura Council sessions, the upper house of Bahrain's parliament, have also been selectively edited by administrators before being uploaded to the council's official YouTube Live channel. For instance, a March 3, 2019 recording omitted controversial remarks by a councilmember regarding the relationship between the village of Ma’ameer and a large industrial area where the member owned a business. Similarly, a June 2018 video excluded footage of a representative calling opponents of a new retirement law "psychos." This statement was also removed from the website of the local newspaper Al-Ayam.

In July 2018, YouTube removed a video showing a verbal attack on a Bahraini cleric who had visited Israel. The video garnered 32,000 views within four hours of its upload before being taken down, though YouTube did not specify the reason for its removal.

Online platforms’ reporting mechanisms have been exploited to suppress criticism of authorities and target accounts operated by activists and independent journalists. In March 2019, the Twitter account of the independent news site Awal Online was temporarily suspended due to coordinated user reporting. Similarly, in February 2019, Instagram permanently closed the account of activist Yousef al-Jamri. Earlier, in October 2018, a video of Hezbollah's leader discussing Bahrain's political situation was removed from al-Jamri's account, with Instagram citing community guideline violations. In December 2018, journalist Hani al-Fardan's Instagram account was also suspended due to organized user reporting.

Transparency reports indicate that neither Google nor Twitter removed content based on requests from Bahraini authorities. While Twitter received two content removal requests in the first half of 2018, no content was withheld.

Authorities have employed coercive measures, including arrests, prosecutions, and torture, to compel online forum moderators to shut down their websites. In April 2019, during the arrest of columnist Ibrahim al-Sheikh, seven tweets were deleted from his account, though it remains unclear who removed them. In the same month, former member of parliament Mohammed Khalid briefly deactivated his Twitter account following a brief detention, later reactivating it as a private account. His lawyer, Mohammed al-Othman, deactivated his Twitter account twice during the same period before restoring it.

=== Online Manipulation ===
Government authorities and pro-government trolls actively shape and manipulate the online information environment in Bahrain.

Officials frequently issue warnings about discussing sensitive topics or "misusing" social media platforms. In May 2019, the Ministry of Interior's (MOI) cybercrime directorate labelled the accounts of several Bahraini activists and journalists as "malicious." Shortly after, users received SMS messages and tweets cautioning that following such accounts could result in prosecution. Similarly, in June 2018, the MOI warned against reposting a resurfaced 2011 video showing a "war dance" performed by naturalized Bahraini citizens of Arab origins. The MOI claimed that sharing the video aimed to "incite sedition and disturb social peace," threatening legal action against those who shared it.

Research from 2013 highlighted government ties to extremist Twitter and Facebook accounts advocating violence against both authorities and protesters. The government has also been found impersonating opposition figures online to send malicious links, such as IP trackers, to identify and prosecute anonymous critics.

Organized trolling campaigns, active since 2011, have targeted activists, commentators, and journalists supportive of protests and human rights. These coordinated efforts have successfully silenced or reduced opposition activity, both within Bahrain and abroad. Trolls also spread disinformation, discredit protesters, fuel conflict, and undermine valid social media content. Some accounts even impersonate imprisoned users to interact with opposition supporters.

During the November 2018 parliamentary elections, some citizens received deceptive text messages claiming their names had been removed from the electoral register, discouraging them from voting. While the government denied involvement, the MOI alleged that 40,000 messages originated from Iran in an attempt to disrupt the electoral process. It also accused Iranian-run accounts and opposition groups like Al-Wefaq of threatening candidates and promoting election boycotts.

Social media accounts from Saudi Arabia and the UAE have also influenced Bahrain's online discourse. For instance, in November 2017, a Saudi-based Twitter account launched a trending hashtag blaming “terrorists”—a term often used to describe anti-government protesters—for an oil pipeline fire. The hashtag reached a wide audience, particularly in Saudi Arabia.

=== Censorship and Licensing Restrictions for Media Outlets ===
Regulatory restrictions severely limit users' ability to publish content online, while government censorship imposes indirect economic constraints, leaving many outlets reliant on personal funding.

According to Decree 68/2016, newspapers in Bahrain must obtain a license from the mass media directorate to disseminate electronic media on websites or social media. However, the decree does not specify the criteria for granting or renewing the one-year license. Additionally, applicants must submit a list of their social media accounts, website addresses, and the names of their overseers, potentially exposing employees to government monitoring or coercion. Violating the licensing requirement under Bahrain's press law can result in six months of imprisonment and/or a fine of 5,000 dinars ($13,180).

Decree 68/2016 also prohibits newspapers from posting videos longer than two minutes or live streaming content. Moreover, electronic media must mirror the content of their printed editions, restricting the use of multimedia and limiting creative freedom.

While government restrictions extend to online advertising, some opposition websites continue to operate despite these limitations. Blocked websites face significant challenges in securing advertisements, but outlets like Bahrain Mirror manage to function with minimal resources, often relying on self-funding.

In August 2019, the Information Affairs Authority (IAA) revoked the license of Manama Voice, a news site managed by Bahraini journalist Hani al-Fardan, without providing a specific explanation. Al-Fardan has since continued his reporting through his Instagram account, as publishing on social media does not presently require an IAA license.

=== Online Surveillance and Monitoring ===
State surveillance of online activities in Bahrain is extensive. Reports have highlighted the government's use of spyware to target dissidents. In October 2018, it was revealed that Bahrain had acquired espionage software from private companies, including a system from Verint, designed to gather intelligence from social media. Members of Bahraini intelligence were also trained in using these surveillance systems.

A September 2018 Citizen Lab report indicated that Bahrain might have utilized the Pegasus spyware, developed by the Israeli company NSO Group. Once a user clicks on an exploit link, Pegasus is covertly installed on their phone, allowing the operator to access sensitive data such as passwords, contacts, text messages, live calls from messaging apps, and even the phone's camera and microphone. Citizen Lab found evidence suggesting that the persecuted Shia minority and members of the Coalition of February 14 may have been specifically targeted.

In the lead-up to the October 2018 parliamentary elections, the Ministry of Interior (MOI) announced it was monitoring phone messages, particularly those promoting an election boycott, and warned of legal consequences for those involved.

Additionally, the government of Bahrain purchased $544,000 worth of British surveillance equipment between 2015 and 2017.

A Cyber Safety Directorate was established in November 2013 within the Ministry of State for Telecommunications Affairs to monitor websites and social media platforms, with the stated goal of preventing their use in promoting violence or terrorism, and stopping the spread of information deemed a threat to national security and stability. This initiative followed the creation of a similar unit in 2011 tasked with responding to false information on foreign news sites and social media.

In January 2017, Bahrain ratified the Arab Treaty on Combating Cybercrime, a framework aimed at regulating the misuse of telecommunications, curbing financial fraud, and preventing the spread of terrorism and pornography online. This treaty also introduces provisions for real-time monitoring and data retention, as well as cross-border information sharing. However, the treaty's weak human rights standards could potentially compromise privacy protections when it is incorporated into local law.

Bahrain lacks a comprehensive privacy law. Although a personal data protection law was passed in July 2018, it includes an exemption for national security-related data processing by the Interior Ministry, security services, and other relevant government bodies.

==== Data Retention Policies ====
Since 2009, the Telecommunications Regulatory Authority (TRA) has required all telecommunications providers to retain records of customers' phone calls, emails, and website visits for up to three years. These companies must also grant security forces access to subscriber data upon request from the public prosecution, although data content access requires a court order.

To obtain an operating license (see A5), telecom providers must create a “lawful access capability plan” that facilitates security forces’ access to communications metadata. In February 2016, the provider 2Connect had its license revoked for failing to establish this plan.

Cybercafés are also subject to increased oversight, with a commission from four ministries ensuring strict adherence to rules that prohibit access to minors and mandate that all computer terminals remain fully visible to observers.

Transparency reports from companies indicate that Bahrain made one data request to Google, six to Twitter, and three to Facebook in the first half of 2017, though all requests were denied. There were no requests made in 2018. It remains unclear how local providers comply with state requests for user data, as such information is not publicly disclosed.

Bahrain introduced a personal data protection law in July 2018, which mirrors the European General Data Protection Regulation (GDPR) and outlines requirements for entities collecting, processing, and storing personal data, including obtaining user consent and informing them of data collection. However, the enforcement details of this law are still uncertain.

== Freedom of Association ==
According to the Human Right Watch 2011 country report, freedom of association is severely curtailed by an association law, "which prohibits organizations from involvement in political activities." The Bahrain Human Rights Society, Bahrain Centre for Human Rights and Bahrain Youth Human Rights Society have been closed or ordered to close.

In June 2017, the National Democratic Action Society party (Wa'ad) was banned on terrorism charges. The ban was criticised by Amnesty International and Bahrain Institute for Rights and Democracy. Lynn Maalouf of Amnesty International stated that "the suspension of Waad is a flagrant attack on freedom of expression and association".

== Bandargate ==
The Bandargate scandal was an alleged political conspiracy by the certain government officials in Bahrain to foment sectarian strife and marginalize the Shia community in the country. The conspiracy was allegedly led and financed by Sheikh Ahmed bin Ateyatalla Al Khalifa, Minister of Cabinet Affairs and head of the Civil Informatics Organization and member of the Al Khalifa royal family. The allegations were revealed in September 2006, in a 240-page document produced by the Gulf Centre for Democratic Development, and authored by Dr Salah Al Bandar, an adviser to the Cabinet Affairs Ministry. Following the distribution of the report, Bahraini police forcibly deported Dr Al Bandar to the United Kingdom, where he holds citizenship. According to Dr al-Bandar, the Minister paid five main operatives a total of more than $2.7 million to run:

- a secret intelligence cell spying on Shi’as
- GONGOs – government operated bogus NGOs like the ‘Bahraini Jurists Society’ and the ‘Bahrain Human Rights Watch Society’
- internet forums and websites that foment sectarian hatred
- subsidisation of ‘new converts’ from Shia Islamic sect to the Sunni sect
- payments for election rigging.

== Freedom of religion ==
The Constitution states that Islam is the official religion and that Shari'a (Islamic law) is a principal source for legislation. Article 22 of the Constitution provides for freedom of conscience, the inviolability of worship, and the freedom to perform religious rites and hold religious parades and meetings, in accordance with the customs observed in the country; however, the Government placed some limitations on the exercise of this right. The Government continued to exert a level of control and to monitor both Sunni and Shi'a Muslims, and there continued to be government discrimination against Shi'a Muslims in certain fields. Members of other religious groups who practice their faith privately do so without interference from the Government. There were occasional reports of incidents between the Government and elements of the Shi'a majority population, who were often critical of the Sunni-controlled Government's rule. Problems continued to exist, stemming primarily from the Government's perceived unequal treatment of Shi'a in the country.

=== Destruction of religious facilities ===
In the wake of the 2011 Arab Spring uprising and crackdown against Shia protest in Bahrain, "dozens" of Shia mosques have been leveled by the government according to a report in McClatchy newspapers. According to Shiite leaders interviewed by the reporter, work crews have often arrived "in the dead of night, accompanied by police and military escorts", to demolish the mosques, and in many cases, have hauled away the buildings' rubble before townspeople awake so as to leave no trace. Sheikh Khalid bin Ali bin Abdulla al Khalifa, the minister of justice and Islamic affairs for Bahrain, defended the demolitions stating: "These are not mosques. These are illegal buildings." However the McClatchy reporter found that photos taken of several mosques before their destruction by the government "showed they were well maintained, decades-old structures."

=== Media and publication ===
Bahrain has eight daily newspapers representing a broad section of opinion. In 2002, Al Wasat was set up by Mansoor Al-Jamri, the son of Bahrain's spiritual Shi'a leader, Sheikh Abdul-Amir Al-Jamri and the spokesman of the Bahrain Freedom Movement. The paper is broadly sympathetic to the Shia Islamist opposition, particularly Ali Salman. Akhbar Al Khaleej has traditionally been close to Bahrain's Left and Arab nationalist strands, featuring controversial columnists such as Sameera Rajab. Al Ayam is seen as solidly pro-government, with its proprietor an advisor to the King.

The Press Law 47 of 2002 has been strongly criticised as restrictive as it specifies criminal charges against those who criticise the head of state or Islam, or "threaten national security". However, discussion in the newspapers is often robust with journalists frequently criticising government ministers: for instance one newspaper recently criticised the Minister of Housing, Fahmi Al Jowder, for lavishing "ludicrous praise" on the King.

Liberal intellectuals in the press have faced concerted campaigns against them by Islamists. In 2005, hundreds of Shia Islamists protested outside the Al Ayam's offices after it published a cartoon on Iran's Mahmoud Ahmadinejad's election victory; while a Sunni Islamist campaign against the paper's editor, Isa Al Shaygi, was condemned at a conference of the International Federation of Journalists: "The vicious and unprovoked attack on a respected and distinguished colleague is an example of the intolerant and undemocratic character of extremist politics that is increasingly being used against the free press."

Various Bahraini liberal intellectuals in Bahrain strongly criticized the Bahraini government for "favoring extremist Islamic religious groups and hastening to respond to their demands at the expense of the interests of many social groups and various sectors of production," and expressed concern "about the course that Bahraini politics is taking in light of the fear of The decline of freedoms and the issuance of Taliban-ish laws that tighten the screws on them."

All broadcast media is owned and managed by the government. In 2005, three website administrators were arrested by security forces.

As such, many political websites and blogs are blocked by the government, and as of November 2005 the government requires all Bahraini websites to register with the Ministry of Information. In August 2006, Bahraini government authorities blocked internet access to Google Earth and Google Video. Recently they have blocked the popular site anonymous.com

In October 2006, the Criminal Court issued a ban on the publication of any news, information or commentary on the series of allegations in the Bandargate scandal, which has continued to date. In the following weeks, the Ministry of Information ordered Bahraini ISPs to block several websites that violated the ban, include the websites of National Democratic Action (liberal opposition political society), the Bahrain Centre for Human Rights and the Arab Network for Human Rights Information. The block order was accompanied by press statements from the Ministry threatening the website owners with legal action.

In January 2009, Bahrain has started blocking a vastly increased number of sites through the Information Affairs Authority (IAA). The new filtering has had a noticeable impact in internet access speeds for all traffic.

On 31 August 2014, photographer Ahmed Humaidan was condemned to 10 years in prison after covering the 2011 uprising, allegedly for attacking the police.

=== Public gatherings ===
New political freedoms mean that public political activity and demonstrations are a common occurrence: according to the Ministry of Interior's figures there were 498 street demonstrations in 2006, up from 259 the previous year.

In July 2005, Human Rights Watch said:

Bahrain has been a poster child for political reform in the Middle East, but police attacks like this one are a worrisome trend. [...] Bahrain is growing more repressive in response to peaceful political activism.

Despite this prediction, the European University Institute, in its study of civil society in Bahrain in 2006, Voices in Parliament, Debates in Majalis, Banners on the Street: Avenues of Political Participation in Bahrain, found that:

Demonstrations of all sorts occur on a regular bases – less than common in the region. The laws regulating rallies and demonstrations predate the reforms; a bill for a new one has not yet been passed by parliament. As is the case with press freedom, a general liberal practise without the necessary legal foundation can be assessed. Normally neither the government nor the security forces interfere with demonstrations – unless feeling threatened. This lack of legal certainty is obviously wanted: ‘You have to see what we practice, not what is written in laws. Our practise is very liberal. One also has to see in which part of the world we're living’ says the then head of the central informatics organisation and now minister of the royal court, Sheikh Mohammed bin Atiyatallah Al Khalifa.

Bahrain is the only country in the Middle East to have sacked a senior government minister as a direct result of a human rights issue. In 2004, when the security forces fired rubber bullets at a demonstration led by Shia religious leaders, King Hamad immediately fired the country's longstanding Interior Minister (and member of the royal family) Sheikh Mohammed bin Khalifa Al Khalifa.

While public demonstrations about various issues regularly take place, they have sometimes resulted in clashes between the police and youths. Fifteen Bahraini Shia activists were arrested between 16 and 20 May 2007 following clashes with the police. Thirteen remain in custody, (as of June 2007) according to the Bahrain Youth Society for Human Rights. In response to the problem presented by violent protestors, the Serbia-based human rights group, the Centre for Applied Non-Violent Action and Strategies, has been invited to Bahrain to teach demonstrators how to demonstrate peacefully. Under the scheme begun in 2007, peace camps will be set up in various trouble spots where specialists will advise on using protest strategies that do not involve violence. It is expected that a thousand youths will go through the training scheme.

The Interior Ministry had to resist pressure in May 2007 from business leaders to 'crack down' on the rioters, as well as deal with concerns that local residents would take matters into their own hands and deal with the rioters themselves. Concerns about vigilantism resulted in a call by Central Municipal Council vice-chairman Abbas Mahfoodh for closer cooperation between politicians and the Interior Ministry to stamp out rioting, after residents of the town of Tubli confronted and chased away three masked men who allegedly planned to commit acts of sabotage using Molotov cocktail firebombs.

In a report issued in 2006, the "Arab Network for Human Rights Information" (a member of the International Freedom of Expression Exchange) documented two cases of human rights activists being harassed by government authorities, through physical and sexual assaults, and fabricated cases.

Since June 2016, the village of Diraz has been besieged by the Bahraini government. The siege included the Bahraini government from forcibly preventing Shias to perform the congregational Juma (Friday) prayer in the Imam Al-Sadiq Mosque in Diraz.

=== Apostasy and changing religion ===
The Bahraini Penal Code does not enlist a penalty for Apostasy or Atheism explicitly, but since Apostasy is punishable by death in Islam, and since Bahrain's constitution states that Islam is the official religion and that Sharia (Islamic law) is a principal source for legislation, as such, there is an established state religion where Islamic studies are mandatory in state schools, there is a religious control over family law or legislation on moral matters, by declaring Islam as the state religion and Islamic law as the source of legislation, the constitution implies that Muslims are forbidden to change their religion. Societal pressure reinforces the Islamic principle, which forbids the conversion from Islam. therefore Bahraini citizens born to Muslim parents cannot change their religion legally.

=== Public restrictions during religious holidays ===
During Ramadan, Bahrain enforces strict laws prohibiting the public consumption of food, drink, or smoking during daylight hours, with violators—Muslim or non-Muslim—facing jail terms of up to one year and fines up to 100 Bahraini dinars, in accordance with Articles 309 and 310 of the Penal Code. These regulations aim to preserve respect for the fasting period, one of Islam's five pillars, but raise significant concerns regarding freedom of religion and civil rights, particularly for non-Muslim citizens, and or secular individuals, and expatriates who do not observe Ramadan. Additionally, the Ministry of Information orders the closure of bars during the month, particularly targeting hotels that fail to comply with the alcohol ban. Hotel representatives have criticized these measures, highlighting the negative economic impact on tourism and their infringement on individual freedoms. Critics argue that imposing such religious norms on the broader population and non-observant communities contradicts the principle of "no compulsion in religion" and harms Bahrain's reputation as a tolerant and inclusive country. While these regulations are intended to respect Islamic traditions, they are seen as limiting personal freedoms, alienating non-Muslim residents and visitors, and economically damaging key sectors like hospitality and tourism.

=== Religious Indoctrination ===
In the past, up until the Islamic Revolution of 1979, the Iranian school was the school of choice most Bahrainis would go to, as such, the school had a secular approach influenced by the Pahlavi Dynasty. The Iranian school was shut down in 1996 after the "Islamic Republic of Iran", whom then had gained control of the school, was accused by the Bahraini government of interfering in the country's internal politics and affairs throughout the school.

In Bahrain's state schools, Islamic (Sunni Maliki) studies are mandatory for all students hailing from Muslim families, not choice based as it is (said to be) in the case of Non-Muslims. As such, a lot of these schools' educational materials (produced by Al-Obeikan, a Saudi company) include religious references and influences. Many Bahrainis choose send their children to Bahraini schools simply due to the fact that governmental schools are free of charge for Bahraini citizens, this implies that the majority of Bahraini students are being indoctrinated at such a young age without consent.

Furthermore, students from non-Muslim or secular backgrounds may feel marginalized by the religious framing of education. This raises important questions about academic integrity and the right to an education free from religious indoctrination.

International human rights standards, such as those outlined in the Universal Declaration of Human Rights, emphasize the importance of education that encourages critical thought and respects diverse beliefs. The practice of including religious texts in science curricula may conflict with these principles, necessitating a careful balance between cultural values and the right to a secular education.

==== Incorporation of Religious Texts in Scientific Education ====
The integration of religious texts, particularly Quranic verses, into the science curriculum has raised concerns regarding the intersection of education and freedom of religion. Across various grades in government schools, science textbooks often include verses from the Quran alongside discussions of biological concepts, such as cells and heredity.

This practice may aim to align scientific teachings with Islamic values, fostering a sense of cultural identity among students. However, the inclusion of religious texts can complicate the objective of providing a comprehensive and secular education. Critics argue that this approach may hinder students' ability to distinguish between empirical scientific knowledge and religious beliefs, potentially limiting their understanding of fundamental scientific principles.

== Women and children ==
King Hamad's moves to promote women's rights have been described by Amnesty International as representing a "New Dawn for Bahraini Women". In 2002, women voted for the first time in national elections and were given equal political rights.

However, these top-down reforms have proven contentious, with calls for reform opposed by conservatives and the royal family. In 2002 the decision by King Hamad to grant women the right to vote and political rights equal to men was opposed by a majority of Bahraini women, with 60% of women surveyed saying they disagreed with the move. Salafists have publicly restated their opposition to women's participation in parliament, and none of the Islamist parties that dominate parliament has ever fielded a female candidate. One woman won a seat in parliament in 2006, although her victory in the sparsely populated constituency in the south of the country was seen by some as engineered by the government which wanted to see a woman represented in Council of Deputies.

A bill prompted by women's rights activists in 2005 to introduce a unified personal status law to protect women's rights in marriage, divorce and other family matters was opposed in a series of large-scale demonstrations organised by an alliance of Salafists and Shia Islamists including Al Wefaq and Asalah. The demonstrations (and the implicit threat of escalation by those who organised them) forced the government to withdraw the law and was seen as a major defeat for women's rights activists.

In response to sweeping poll victories by Islamists in 2006's election, Amnesty International Bahrain's head of campaigns, Fawzia Rabea, described the threat to women's rights as 'very serious' and called on women to do everything in their power to fight laws proposed by the new parliament that could limit their freedom. After newly elected Al Wefaq MP, Sayed Abdulla Al A'ali, called for legislation to restrict women's employment rights by banning women from "male-orientated jobs", Rabea said, "With this type of thinking I am sure we are facing a very big challenge with parliament. I am worried about this, it is very serious." Bahrain Women's Union president, Mariam Al Ruwaie, expressed surprise at the MP's suggestions, "This does not agree with His Majesty the King's reforms, which give women and men the same rights for education and work. In Bahrain's society women make up 26 per cent of the labour force, there are more girls in schools and universities than men and their results are better...I am worried because the parliament has not started and he [Al A'ali] has said something like this. It is a bad start."

Ghada Jamsheer, one of the most prominent women's rights activist in Bahrain has called the government's reforms "artificial and marginal". In a statement in December 2006 she said:

The government is using the family law issue as a bargaining tool with opposition Islamic groups. This is evident through the fact that the authorities raise this issue whenever they want to distract attention from other controversial political issues. While no serious steps are taken to help approve this law, although the government and its puppet National Assembly had no trouble in the last four years when it came to approving restrictive laws related to basic freedoms. All of this is why no one in Bahrain believes in Government clichés and government institution like the High Council for Women. The government used women's rights as a decorative tool on the international level. While the High Council for Women was used to hinder non-governmental women societies and to block the registration of the Women Union for many years. Even when the union was recently registered, it was restricted by the law on societies.

In 2017, a British mum got jailed in Bahrain after her 'violent husband accused her of adultery.’ Hannah James was thrown behind bars after her husband claimed she had cheated on him.

In recent years, feminist activism has gained prominence in online discussions and social media platforms. Users have utilized these spaces to raise awareness about gender-based violence and advocate for women’s rights. In August 2021, social media campaigns emerged demanding the right for Bahraini women to pass their citizenship to their children. Similarly, in September 2021, Twitter users highlighted the difficulties women face when seeking divorce due to the rigid nature of Islamic Sharia courts.

=== Women in the 2011 crackdown ===
Bahraini human rights groups say "hundreds of women have been detained" in recent weeks prior to 30 May 2011, "the first time in the wave of protests sweeping the Arab world that large groups of women have been targeted".

=== Child rights ===
In March 2021, Human Rights Watch and Bahrain Institute for Rights and Democracy claimed that children aged between 11 and 17 were being held by Bahrain police over protest-related cases since mid-February 2020. The children were unnecessarily detained during the 10th anniversary of the 2011 pro-democracy uprising. The groups claimed that the children were beaten and threatened with rape and electric shocks by the Bahraini security forces. A 13-year-old child was hit on his head, while the police continued with the threats to rape him, give him electric shocks from a car battery, and beat his genitals. Prosecutors and police barred the parents and lawyers of children from being present during the interrogations as children were terrorized into confessing.

A 15-year-old boy, Hussein Sayed Taher, was arbitrarily arrested at the age of 12 and sentenced to 8 years in prison. He went on a hunger strike in August 2021 as he was being ill-treated by Bahraini authorities.

On 7 February 2022, the Human Rights Watch and Bahrain Institute for Rights and Democracy (BIRD) said that the Bahrain authorities detained six children, aged 14 and 15, without any written justification. They were being held in a child welfare facility. The authorities denied the parents’ requests to visit their children and to be present during their interrogations. The children's alleged offences occurred in December 2020 or January 2021, when they were 13 and 14. The Office of the Public Prosecution alleged that the boys damaged a car near a police station by throwing Molotov cocktails.

== LGBT Rights ==
Technically, consensual sex between same sex couples is legal. However, the government has in recent years adopted restrictive measures towards what it identifies as "moral" issues. By including homosexual sexual acts and behaviour under the category of "immoral" behaviour, the government has attempted to indirectly ban homosexuality. The punishments for some of these crimes can include five months of hard labour and, although it is seldom sentenced, imprisonment of up to ten years.

== Labor ==
According to the International Confederation of Free Trade Unions annual report of 2006 unions are allowed to play an "effective role" with workers having the right to unionise. According to the ICTFU's annual report:

The Workers' Trade Union Law of September 2002 introduced the right to belong to trade unions in Bahrain. It established the General Federation of Bahrain Trade Unions (GFBTU) but not full freedom of association, as all trade unions have to belong to the GFBTU. Workers in the private and public sector may join trade unions, including non-citizens, who make up the majority of Bahrain's workforce.

Only one trade union may be formed at each establishment, but no prior authorisation is required to form a union. The only requirement is that the union's constitution must be communicated to the Ministry of Labour and Social Affairs, together with the names of the founding members.

An amended trade union law that would allow government employees to form trade unions but would remove some workers rights' protection was submitted to Parliament in October 2004. However it had still not been approved by the end of 2005.

Trade unions are not subject to administrative dissolution. They may not engage in political activities.

The ICFTU's main concern in its 2006 report was that a new labour law would be far more restrictive of worker's rights. The ICFTU commented:

A new law, soon to be passed, looks set to restrict unions' freedom to carry out a legal strike. There was much concern about the lack of proper protection foreseen for foreign workers who make up 60 per cent of the workforce. The head of Gulf Air's union was sacked shortly after his election.

A visiting delegate from the International Labour Organization at a seminar in Bahrain on trade unionism, held under the patronage of the Labour Ministry, described some of Bahrain's labour laws as out of line with international standards. According to the ILO international labour standards department deputy director, Karen Curtis, the current rules governing where strikes can be held in Bahrain were too restrictive.

In response to the government's labour reforms, Bahrain's Crown Prince, Sheikh Salman bin Hamad Al Khalifa, was invited as guest of honour to the International Labour Organization's 96th session, where he used the opportunity of addressing the conference to announce that the first regional dialogue on workers' issues would be held in Bahrain. "This will offer countries that recruit manpower and those that provide it an opportunity to engage in an open and honest discussion on the impact of globalisation." The ILO Director General Juan Somavia has described the Crown Prince as an innovator with a modern vision of commitment to change and a belief in dialogue. Somavia has noted that Bahrain had been one of the pioneers of Decent Work Country Programmes, beginning with a pilot programme in 2002.

=== Migrant workers ===
According to Human Rights Watch, in as of 2011 there were more than 458,000 guest workers in Bahrain, many of whom experience prolonged periods of withheld wages, passport confiscation, unsafe housing, excessive work hours and physical abuse. Government protective measures are "largely ineffective."

In August 2009 Bahrain adopted Decision 79/2009 permitting guest workers, except for domestics, more freedom to change jobs. According to Human Rights Watch, as of 2011 many workers were unaware of this right.

In 2007, government passed legislation to ban construction and other outdoor work between noon and 4 pm during the summer – the hottest times of the day. The vast majority of those involved in this type of work being expatriate labourers from the Indian sub-continent. The move was backed by a "massive" labour inspection campaign by the Ministry of Labour to ensure that companies obeyed the decision. The ban was criticized by construction companies saying that the government's decision would delay their projects, but according to the Ministry of Labour, migrant workers' protection representatives and human rights activities have welcomed the move.

An ICFTU Annual Report 2006 found that "Foreign workers harshly treated":

There are a large number of foreign workers and, while in theory they are allowed to join unions and run for union office, they mainly prefer to stay out of union activities as they have no protection against dismissal. According to the proposed legislation, if expatriate workers overstay their work permits, they suffer heavy fines, are imprisoned for unspecified lengths of time and then deported. The government admitted that the new law would not give domestic servants any employment rights, but contained measures that would protect them against abuse from employers.

Bahrain is considered a Tier 2 country on the US State Department Trafficking in Persons report, the second highest tier, and indicated that Bahrain "does not fully meet the minimum standards for the elimination of trafficking," but is "making significant efforts to do so."

== Greenwashing ==
On 4 November 2021, the UK politicians accused Bahrain of "textbook greenwashing", as the regime promoted its green credentials at COP26 while causing 'irreparable damage' to the environment by participating in the Saudi-led Yemen war. In a joint letter sent to the crown prince Salman bin Hamad Al Khalifa, six British politicians and Members of Parliament stated that Bahrain's continued participation in the Saudi-led bombing campaigns destroyed ecosystems and contaminated the soil and water in Yemen, while contributing to the humanitarian disaster in the country. The signatories said that Bahrain's involvement in the war undermines its commitment to tackle climate change and protect the environment.

== Academic whitewashing ==
In November 2021, the European Centre for Democracy and Human Rights (ECDHR) reported that Bahrain is using institutional collaborations to hide abysmal human rights records. Such partnerships between an academic institution and an abusive regime are based on the concept of academic whitewashing. It may include donating funds, paying regular visits, engaging in spreading misinformation or teaching courses despite awareness of the countries’ human rights abuses. According to the report, Bahrain was using this strategy of academic whitewashing to conceal its record of systematic discrimination against Shia Muslims, religious intolerance, and suppression of free speech. Bahrain's ambassador to the United States maintains a relationship with Boston University and Suffolk University, while he has a history of overseeing human rights abuses committed by the Bahraini government. Besides, the UK based University of Huddersfield is also directly involved with Bahrain's Royal Academy of Policing (RAP), an organisation that has repeatedly been accused of engaging in torture. Another example is the Italian University La Sapienza, which inaugurated a new professorship to honor Bahrain's King.

== Human rights NGOs ==
There are several generic human rights NGOs in Bahrain, and other NGOs working in related fields such as women's rights, child rights and migrant labour. The two most prominent organisations have been the Bahrain Human Rights Society and the Bahrain Centre for Human Rights, which have frequently been highly critical of one another, the Center accusing the Society of having been unduly close to government. Other NGOs active around 2008–10 included the Bahrain Youth Society for Human Rights, the Women's Petition Committee, the Committee for Martyrs and Victims of Torture, the Human Rights Office of the Haq Movement for Liberty and Democracy, the Committee for Citizenship-less and the Coordinating Committee for the Defence of Political Detainees.

As of 2011, several human rights NGOs, including at least the first three named above, had been closed or ordered to close, as was the Bahrain Migrant Workers' Protection Society.

In the wake of the 2011 uprising, Physicians for Human Rights has become internationally recognized for its work exposing human rights violations in Bahrain, particularly regarding medical neutrality. The organization released a report titled Do No Harm: A Call for Bahrain to End Systematic Attacks on Doctors and Patients, in April 2011 which detailed the government's persecution of medical professionals.

Shia rights watch, an NGO based in Washington, DC, has also stepped up to expose the violations against Shia Muslims in Bahrain. The organization published a report titled Shia Target of Inhumane Treatment: Bahrain Report 2011, which documents the systematic oppressions of Shia Muslims by the government of Bahrain.

Bahrain also cancelled the visas of Human Rights Watch personnel. They were supposed to be in Bahrain for a conference.

== National human rights institution ==
In 2008, during the Universal Periodic Review of its human rights record at the UN Human Rights Council, the Government announced plans to create a national human rights institution for Bahrain. The Office of the High Commissioner for Human Rights and the Foreign Ministry jointly organised a workshop in Manama, bringing in NHRI experts from Jordan, Morocco and Northern Ireland to meet a wide range of Bahraini civil society. The NHRI was duly established by the King on 11 November 2009 through Royal Order No. 46/2009.

On 25 April 2010, Royal Order No. 16/2010 appointed 17 men and five women as the first members of the NHRI, including prominent human rights activists Salman al-Sayyid 'Ali Kamal al-Din, the former deputy secretary-general of the independent Bahrain Human Rights Society, as president. While the appointments were initially welcomed by Amnesty International, other NGOs including the Bahrain Centre for Human Rights questioned the credibility and independence of the new institution. The Center alleged that several of the 22 nominees held government appointments or were linked to bodies accused by the Society of operating as government fronts or GONGOs, such as the Bahrain Human Rights Watch Society, the Jurists Society and the Association of Public Freedoms and Human Rights.

On 6 September 2010, Salman Kamal al-Din resigned as president, in protest at the institution's failure to criticise the arrests of pro-democracy activists. The current president of the institution is Maria Khoury and the Secretary General is Dr. Khalifa Al-Fadhel.

December 2016, Euro Mediterranean Human Rights Monitor condemned Bahrain's policies which restrict the freedom of press and media. The violations include arresting, and torturing journalists who have a contrary political view to the government. According to the International Monitor, these journalists are accused of being involved in acts of sabotage or even in supporting terrorism. The decline of the level of press freedom has put Bahrain in the 142 out of 180 on the global press freedom rankings for 2016.

== See also ==
- Al Bandar report
- Bahrain Centre for Human Rights
- Bahrain Human Rights Society
- Bahrain Human Rights Watch Society
- Human rights in Islamic countries
- List of Bahrain-related topics
