= Censorship in Bahrain =

The Kingdom of Bahrain is deemed ‘Not Free’ in terms of Net Freedom and Press Freedom by Freedom House. The 2016 World Press Freedom Index by Reporters Without Borders ranked Bahrain 162nd out of 180 countries, noting that "freedom of expression does not exist in Bahrain".

Bahrain is a constitutional monarchy led by the Khalifa royal family. Criticized by numerous organizations for its censorship of information and repression of its people, it has become notorious for jailing journalists.

== Constitutional laws regarding censorship ==
The Constitution of the Kingdom of Bahrain outlines freedoms of expression, press and telecommunications in Articles 23–26.

Article 23 states that citizens are “free to express their opinion and publish it … provided it does not violate the fundamentals of the Islamic faith or the unity of the country and does not provoke sectarianism or communalism.”

Article 24 claims that “freedom of press, printing and publishing is guaranteed.”

Article 26 posits that “freedom to use postal correspondence, telegraph and telephone is guaranteed as also their secrecy. Correspondence will not be censored or its secrets revealed except in cases stated in law.”

Many journalists argue that these clauses are open-ended and can be arbitrarily interpreted by Bahraini officials. Various sources claim that in practice these rights are not upheld.

== Censored subjects ==
=== Opposition ===
Since 2011, a surge of uprisings and demonstrations have taken place against the current regime, as part of the Arab Springs. This opposition to the government has been met with increased repression and harsher censoring measures for dissidents.

One source states authorities “have held secret trials where protesters have been sentenced to death, arrested prominent mainstream opposition politicians, jailed nurses and doctors who treated injured protesters, seized the health care system that had been run primarily by Shiites, fired 1,000 Shiite professionals and canceled their pensions, detained students and teachers who took part in the protests, beat and arrested journalists, and forced the closure of the only opposition newspaper.”

Other repressive tactics deployed by the government against opposing figures, activists and journalists include arrests, torture, and the revocation of citizenship.

=== Other subjects ===
Aside from the repression of any anti-government sentiments, matters pertaining to human rights are heavily censored. Promotion of hatred, gambling or pornography are also banned from websites and media sources.

== Censored outlets ==
=== Press ===
All major newspaper outlets within Bahrain are heavily influenced by the government besides one. The only newspaper seen as outside the sway of the government is Al-Wasat, whose building headquarters was attacked by a crowd of pro-government supporters carrying knives and clubs. Pro-government media, on the other hand, have allegedly engaged in presenting misinformation. According to a report by Bahrain Watch, there have been 25 instances of misinformation between 2011 and 2014. Self-censorship occurs within the media, as many newspapers elect not to cover political or controversial subjects.

The Press and Publication Law of 2002 has been strongly criticized as repressive. It prohibits any publications against the regime in power, averse to the state's official religion, breaching ethics or jeopardizing public peace. Many Bahraini journalists argue that this language can be arbitrarily interpreted.

=== Internet ===
The government maintains control over the Internet by requiring all websites to register with the Information Affairs Authority (IAA). Internet Service Providers (ISPs) are indirectly controlled through the Telecommunications Regulation Authority (TRA) under the pretext of helping to protect intellectual property. A resolution issued by the Ministry of Culture and Information in January 2009 requires all ISPs to install a website blocking software chosen by the Ministry. The IAA and select Ministries within the government can decide to block certain websites, which is then enforced by the ISP.

The IAA typically sites Articles 19 and 20 of Bahrain's Press Laws and Regulations when blocking access to websites. According to the Article 19, “it is possible to prohibit circulation of publications instigating hatred of the political regime, encroaching on the state’s official religion, [and] breaching ethics…” According to Reporters Without Borders, over 1,000 websites have been blocked or shut down. This includes human rights websites, blogs, online forums and social media pages.

== Journalist arrests ==
Numerous journalists have been jailed under arbitrary causes, the arrests escalating during the uprisings of 2011.

On August 31, 2014, photographer Ahmed Humaidan was condemned to 10 years in prison after covering the 2011 uprising, allegedly for attacking the police.

Sayed Ahmed Al Mousawi, the winner of more than 100 international awards was arrested in February 2014 for “distributing SIM cards” to persons supposedly implicated in terrorist actions and photographing anti-government demonstrations. His ten-year jail sentence was upheld in court.

Nabeel Rajab, a blogger who heads the Bahrain Centre for Human Rights, was arrested without a warrant at his home on June 13, 2016.

Reporters Without Borders and other organizations are campaigning for the release of imprisoned journalists.

== See also ==
- Human rights in Bahrain
