= Alarab =

Alarab may refer to:

- Al-Arab, a pan-Arab newspaper based in London
- Alarab News Channel, an Arabic-language news channel
- Kul al-Arab (website alarab.com), Israeli Arabic-language weekly newspaper
