= Ali Abdulemam =

Bahraini blogger

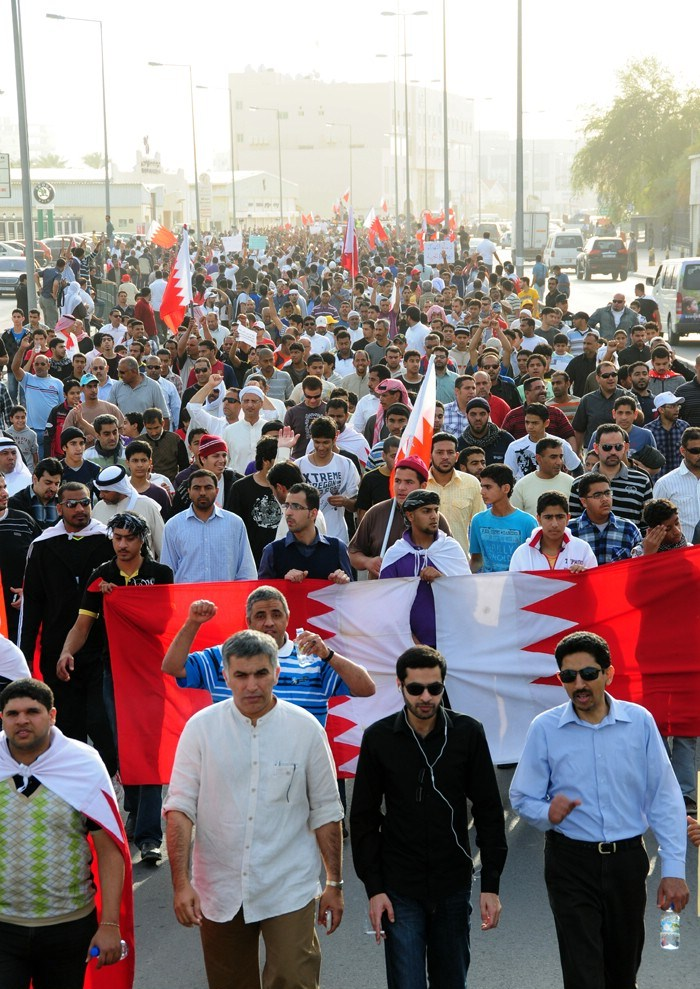
Ali Abdulemam (middle) along with Nabeel Rajab (left) and Abdulhadi Alkhawaja (right) taking part in a pro-democracy march in 2011

Ali Hassan Abdullah Abdulemam (Arabic: علي حسن عبد الله عبد الامام), widely known as Ali Abdulemam (علي عبد الإمام) is a Bahraini liberal blogger and contributor to Global Voices who is the founder of Bahrain Online, a popular online forum and pro-democracy news website, and a member of the research and advocacy group Bahrain Watch. Although he went into hiding in March 2011 to escape the Bahraini Government's crackdown on protesters, he was convicted in absentia for plotting to overthrow the Government, and sentenced to 15 years in prison. Global human rights organizations are unconvinced of Abdulemam's guilt and have voiced opposition to the persistent censorship and obstruction of journalists in the region. In 2013, Abdulemam escaped to the UK where he was swiftly granted political asylum.

== Life ==
=== Bahrain Online ===
Abdulemam started Bahrain Online as an anonymous blog in 1998, but revealed his identity later in 2002. The site rapidly became one of Bahrain's most popular and featured contributions to forums from members of the Bahraini opposition. In late 2002, the government of Bahrain ordered the national internet service provider, Batelco, to block access to the site, which was hosted in the US. Contributors and readers were able to access the site by using censorship circumvention tools.

In February 2005, Bahraini authorities raided Abdulemam's home in Jidhafs while Abdulemam was at work. When he learned of the raid, Abdulemam turned himself into authorities to face charges of "inciting hatred of the government". He and his web team were released after 15 days in custody.

=== 2010 arrest and torture ===
In August 2010, Abdulemam was arrested by Bahraini authorities, accused of "spreading false information". He was imprisoned from September 4, 2010, until late February 2011. Reporters Without Borders reports that he was denied a lawyer and fired from his work at Gulf Air. His arrest has led to protests from human rights groups across the Arab world. The government of Bahrain accused him in statement released by the state-run Bahrain News Agency of trying to subvert the regime. and he was charged with "spreading false information" After his release, Abdulemam spoke to Al Jazeera about torture he experienced while in government custody.

=== 2011 disappearance and sentencing in absentia ===
Three weeks after his release from custody on February 23, 2011, Abdulemam went missing. He and 20 other prominent Bahraini opposition figures were tried in front of a military court in June 2011, accused of plotting a coup against the Bahraini government. Abdulemam was sentenced to 15 years in prison, in absentia.

=== Escape from Bahrain ===
On May 10, 2013, it emerged that Abdulemam had escaped from Bahrain. He had gone into hiding shortly after the start of the Government's crackdown on protesters in March 2011 to avoid arrest. Activists, consulting with a member of Denmark's Jaeger Corps hatched a plan to get Abdulemam out of the country. The plan was to have American artist Tyler Ramsey visit Bahrain with an entourage including Elizabeth Chambers and two Abdulemam doppelgangers. Abdulemam was to switch places with a member of Ramsey's entourage in a fast-food restaurant at the airport. Ramsey and his entourage would then depart for Cyprus on a chartered jet from a special VIP area at Bahrain Airport, where they would not be subject to security checks or interviews. However, before the plan could be set into motion, Abdulemam escaped Bahrain via the causeway to Saudi Arabia in a car with a hidden compartment. From Saudi Arabia, he traveled by land and sea through Kuwait and Iraq, before departing on flight to London. He was granted asylum in the UK shortly after his arrival.

=== CEPOS Freedom Award ===
On May 21, 2013, the Danish think tank CEPOS held their annual Freedom Award, where Abduleman received the Freedom Prize of $60,000. The event was streamed live over the internet and Abdulemams speech was subsequently uploaded to YouTube.

=== Personal life ===
Ali Abdulemam is married to Jenan Al Oraibi and has three sons and twin daughters

== See also ==
- Bahrain Online
- Wael Abbas
