= Khalil al-Marzooq =

Bahrain politician (born 1967)

Khalil Ebrahim al-Marzooq
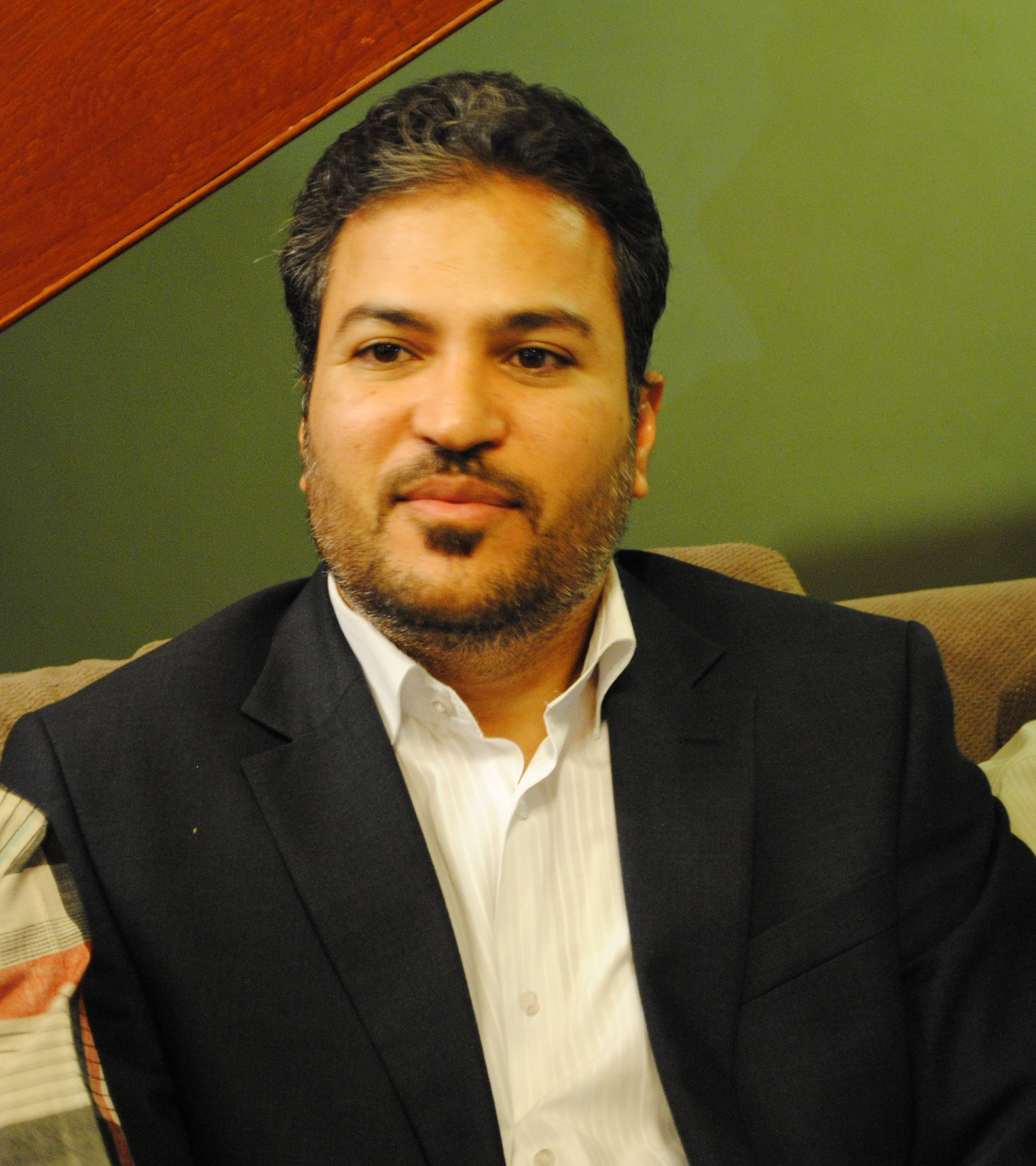

Member of the Bahrain Parliament for 2nd Capital Governante
- In office 2006–2010
- Constituency: 2nd Capital Governorate

Spokesperson for Al Wefaq National Islamic Society
- In office Present

Personal details
- Born: 28 July 1967 (age 58)
- Party: Spokesperson of Al Wefaq National Islamic Society
- Salary: $ 25,500 Annually (Retirement)
- Education: MSc in Management & IT, Sheffield Hallam University UK 1998; BSc in Computer Science, King Fahd University of Petroleum and Minerals 1990; CISA, ISACA 1999
- Website: www.khalilalmarzooq.com

Khalil al-Marzooq is a Bahraini Shi'a politician and former member of the Council of Representatives. During his time in office, he served as first deputy chairman.

On February 14, 2011, al-Marzooq and 17 other MPs from Al Wefaq, the main Shi'a Islamist opposition party, resigned from their seats in parliament. Following the quelling of the unrest by the government, al-Marzooq led negotiations with the government in the Bahrain national dialogue, but he and the four other delegates from Al Wefaq withdrew from negotiations on July 17.

Al-Marzooq was arrested on September 18, 2013 for his criticism of the government. Amnesty International designated him a prisoner of conscience and called for his immediate release. A Bahraini court acquitted him for the charges of "inciting terrorism" and belonging to a terrorist organization on June 25, 2014.

On 1 February 2015, al-Marzooq was interviewed by the newly launched al-Arab News Channel, after which the channel suspended broadcasting.
