= Bahrain Online =

Online forum and pro-democracy news website

Bahrain Online is a popular online forum and pro-democracy news website founded in 1999 by the Bahraini blogger Ali Abdulemam.

== See also ==
- Wael Abbas
