= Ala'a Shehabi =

Journalist and democracy rights activist

- Born: United Kingdom
- Education: Imperial College London
- Children: 1
- Father: Saeed al-Shehabi

Ala'a Shehabi, sometimes referred to as Ala'a al-Shehabi (born 1980/1981), is a British-born Bahraini journalist and democracy-rights activist.

== Early life and education ==
Shehabi was raised in London by her father, political exile Saeed al-Shehabi, leader of the Bahrain Freedom Movement.

Shehabi received a PhD from Imperial College London.

== Career and activism ==
In 2009, Shehabi moved to Bahrain, where she worked as a lecturer in economics at a private Bahraini university.

Shehabi took part in the 2011 Bahraini Uprising, helping to run a media centre, covering the events and attending protests at Pearl Roundabout. Shortly afterward, her husband was arrested for political reasons, and she was dismissed from her job, being told she was "a risk" to the university. Without a job, she began working as a political activist. She founded Bahrain Watch, which advocates for press freedom in the country.

In April 2012, Shehabi was arrested during the Formula One Grand Prix in Bahrain, although she was later released. She has reported that following her release, she was sent multiple emails and messages with spyware, which she presumed were sent by the Bahraini government.

In 2015 she was an editor, along with Marc Owen Jones, on Bahrain's Uprising: Resistance and Repression in the Gulf, an anthology about Bahraini resistance in the early 2010s.

Shehabi has published research through the RAND Corporation on healthcare in the United Kingdom. Shehabi has written for Al Jazeera and The Guardian.

Shehabi is a lecturer in Middle Eastern Politics at University College London.

== Personal life ==
Shehabi married her husband, Ghazi Farhan, a businessman, after she moved to Bahrain in 2009. Farhan was arrested by Bahraini security forces in April 2011 and sentenced to three years in prison, although he was released after ten months. Outside groups such as Human Rights Watch have speculated his arrest was due to Shehabi's political activities.

Shehabi and her husband have one son, Nasser.
