= Saeed al-Shehabi =

Bahraini activist and journalist

Saeed al-Shehabi سعيد الشهابي
- Born: 1954 (age 71–72); Bahrain
- Occupations: Political activist, journalist, commentator, and member of the Bahrain Freedom Movement

Saeed al-Shehabi (Arabic:سعيد الشهابي, born 1954) is a London-based Bahraini political activist, journalist, commentator and member of the Bahrain Freedom Movement.

== Education ==
Shehabi did his primary and secondary education in Bahrain before moving to the United Kingdom in 1973 to study for advanced degrees.

Shehabi earned his BSc and PhD (in Control Engineering) from the City University London.

== Career ==
Shehabi was a pro-democracy activist in Bahrain and founder of al-Wefaq, a pro-democracy political organization in Bahrain which the government of Bahrain dissolved. The Bahrain government has repeatedly and publicly denounced Dr Shebabi, as a result of his political activism and demanded that he be expelled from the United Kingdom. In the past, Bahrain opposition groups have been accused of links to the Iranian government, which has sought to annex the island nation based on historic and demographic claims for decades.

According to the London-based Centre for the Study of Terrorism, of which he is a Trustee, Shahabi edited the London-based Pan-Arabic weekly Al Aalam from 1983 to 1999 and, in addition to being Chairman of the Gulf Cultural Club, serves as a trustee of two Muslim charities located in London, the Dar Al-Hekma Trust and the Abrar Islamic Foundation, and writes "regularly" for Al-Quds and The Muslim News.

The BBC describes Shehabi as "leader of a Bahraini opposition group in London".

Shehabi gained British citizenship in 2002.

In 2012 the Kingdom of Bahrain stripped Shehabi of his Bahraini citizenship, accusing him and 30 other activists with being a "threat to the state's security"

== Personal life ==
Al-Shehabi has one daughter, Ala'a Shehabi, who is a democracy rights activist in Bahrain. In 2015 She published a book with British scholar Marc Owen Jones on the Arab Spring protests in Bahrain.
