= Bahrain Watch =

Advocacy organisation

Bahrain Watch is a "research and advocacy organisation" devoted to issues related to Bahrain. The group was founded in 2011 by several people, including journalist Ala'a Shehabi.

== Activism ==
One of the group's subdivisions, PR Watch, works to identify articles commissioned by the Bahraini government in Western newspapers. The group estimates the government spent US$50 million on such commissioned pieces between 2011 and 2014.

In 2012, Bahrain Watch reported that Bahraini police were using unmarked tear gas canisters to obscure which countries and companies they were sourced from.

In 2013, the group led a campaign to block a shipment of 1.6 million tear gas canisters from South Korea to Bahrain's Interior Ministry. Although their complaint was rejected on the grounds that the company producing the tear gas canisters was not breaking any laws, the government of South Korea did agree to suspend exports of the canisters to Bahrain due to the country's unstable political situation.

In 2014, the group filed a complaint in the UK against Gamma International for allegedly providing spyware to the Bahraini government. Bahrain Watch itself has faced multiple attempted hacking attacks.

In 2015, the group released a report on a series of digital attacks made against Bahraini activists living abroad, although they were not able to identify the perpetrator.

In July 2016, Bahrain Watch released a report on the government's suppression of the internet in Diraz following protests there.

In 2016, the organization launched a website titled #200MoreStories in response to the British Council's #200Stories, which aimed to celebrate "200 years of relations between the UK and Bahrain". Bahrain Watch started their campaign to draw attention to more critical and nuanced perspectives on the two countries' relationship.

The organization has leaked documents relating to donations or funding given by the Bahraini government to other groups or organizations. In 2017, the group launched the Bahrain Budget Transparency Project, an online repository of data about the budgets of the Bahraini government.

In 2018, the group reported that the Bahraini government was using spyware to find information about and track activists on social media.

== Members ==
Among the group's members is cyber-activist Ali Abdulemam.
