= Ebtisam al Saegh =

Bahraini human rights activist

Ebitsam al Saegh
- Occupation: Human rights defender
- Organization: SALAM DHR
- Known for: human rights activism

Ebtisam al Saegh is a human rights defender from Bahrain with the organisation SALAM for Democracy and Human Rights (SALAM DHR). She is considered a "vital human rights advocate" at a time when freedom of expression is increasingly dangerous in Bahrain.

== Arrests and torture ==
In November 2016 al Saegh was questioned by authorities under suspicion of “inciting hatred against the Bahraini regime” and “threatening public safety and security” for posts she had made on Twitter.

In May 2017, Amnesty International documented the arrest, torture, including sexual assault, of Ebtisam al-Saegh at the Bahrain's National Security Agency (NSA). When al-Saegh was detained in May 2017, she was physically and sexually abused, and received threats to murder her and her children. She was told by the officers involved in her torture that she was being targeted because she was a human rights defender and that her perpetrators were from Bahrain's NSA.

On 3 July 2017, Ebtisam al-Saegh tweeted about the ill treatment of women at the hands of the NSA and held the King of Bahrain responsible for their actions. On the night of 3–4 July 2017, al Seagh was detained at approximately 11:45 p.m. local time by state security forces. According to Amnesty International, around 25 officers claiming to belong to the Criminal Investigation Directorate arrived at her house in five civilian cars and a minibus without an arrest warrant.

Her whereabouts are unknown and the fear is she will face the same or worse treatment this time.

== International reaction ==
Amnesty International and Bahraini democracy advocates based in Britain and the US expressed concern for her safety. The Bahrain Centre for Human Rights called for her immediate release and of all nonviolent activists and detainees held arbitrarily due to their human rights work. Samah Hadid, director for Amnesty International campaigns in the Middle East, criticised the basis of the arrest. She said, "the Bahraini authorities must immediately and unconditionally release Ebtisam al-Saegh, whose only crime is speaking up against a government committed to crushing all forms of dissent.”

In response, the press office of Bahrain’s embassy in London wrote that Bahrain is “firmly committed to the protection and safeguarding of human rights” and has oversight bodies to safeguard them and independently investigate violations.

== See also ==
- Torture in Bahrain
