= Al-Arab News Channel =

Short-lived Arabic-language television news channel

- Country: Saudi Arabia
- Broadcast area: International
- Headquarters: Manama, Bahrain

Programming
- Language: Arabic

Ownership
- Owner: Al Waleed bin Talal Al Saud

History
- Launched: 1 February 2015; 11 years ago
- Closed: 2 February 2015; 11 years ago

Al-Arab (Arabic: العرب) was a short-lived Arabic-language news channel which vowed to practice objective journalism. It was launched on 1 February 2015 and was almost immediately shut down. The channel was owned by Saudi prince and entrepreneur Al Waleed bin Talal, and was based in Manama, Bahrain.

== History ==
In July 2010, Prince Al-Waleed, owner of a stake in News Corporation, planned to collaborate with News Corp to launch a 24-hour Arabic-language news channel. After a year of deliberation, Al-Waleed announced on 13 September 2011 the launch of Alarab as a personal private venture. He said the channel's editorial stance would be "inspired by the recent political events that have transformed the region, with particular attention to be paid to freedom of speech." The channel was supposedly entirely privately funded, with Al-Waleed insisting that it would not receive instructions from the Saudi government. At the time of the launch, no mention was made of News Corp's involvement.

In December 2011, Manama, the capital city of Bahrain, was chosen as the network's headquarters. Doha, Dubai, Abu Dhabi and Beirut were also among the cities considered to host the network. Prince Al-Waleed retained close ties with the Bahraini royal family while his Kingdom Holding Company maintained a presence in the country through indirect investments in the banking sector.

Al-Arab's regional competitors were Qatari-owned Al Jazeera and Saudi-government-owned Al Arabiya, along with BSkyB's Sky News Arabia. In a January 2012 interview, Al-Waleed described Al Jazeera as the "masses channel" while implying that Al Arabiya is the "government channel" among the two main news channels in the Middle East. He stated his goal for Al-Arab to be "a more pragmatic and logical channel that really takes the centre's point of view".

Al-Arab was launched on 1 February 2015. Its first day of programming included an interview with Bahraini Shi'a politician and former member of the Council of Representatives, Khalil al-Marzooq, who discussed the cancelling of 72 Bahrainis' citizenship. The Information Affairs Authority suspended broadcasting in the early hours of the following day. Al-Arab stated that the suspension was for "technical and administrative reasons", while the newspaper Akhbar al-Khaleej attributed the suspension to al-Arab "not adhering to the norms prevalent in Gulf countries". On 9 February, the Information Affairs Authority justified its closure of the channel by arguing that Al-Arab had not "received the necessary permits" and did not "take account of efforts aimed at stemming the tide of extremism and terrorism". The shutdown was attributed to the presence of media censorship in Bahrain.

== Ownership and management ==
Al-Arab was privately owned by Prince Al-Waleed bin Talal, independent from Kingdom Holding Company and Rotana Group, two corporations controlled by the prince. It was headquartered in Manama's Media City complex. The channel was based outside Saudi Arabia as the country did not allow independent news channels to operate within its borders.

The channel's director was Jamal Khashoggi, former editor of Al Watan, a newspaper in Saudi Arabia. Khashoggi was removed as editor in 2010 after Al Watan published an article criticizing Salafism, the fundamentalist Islamic movement that is Saudi Arabia's official state religion.

The channel partnered with US financial news channel Bloomberg Television, which would have provided five hours of daily programming, including financial bulletins, analysis, reports on regional business leaders, and global financial news. The partnership would have brought al-Arab into direct competition with Arabic-language financial news channel CNBC Arabia.
