= Wael Abbas =

Egyptian journalist, blogger, and activist

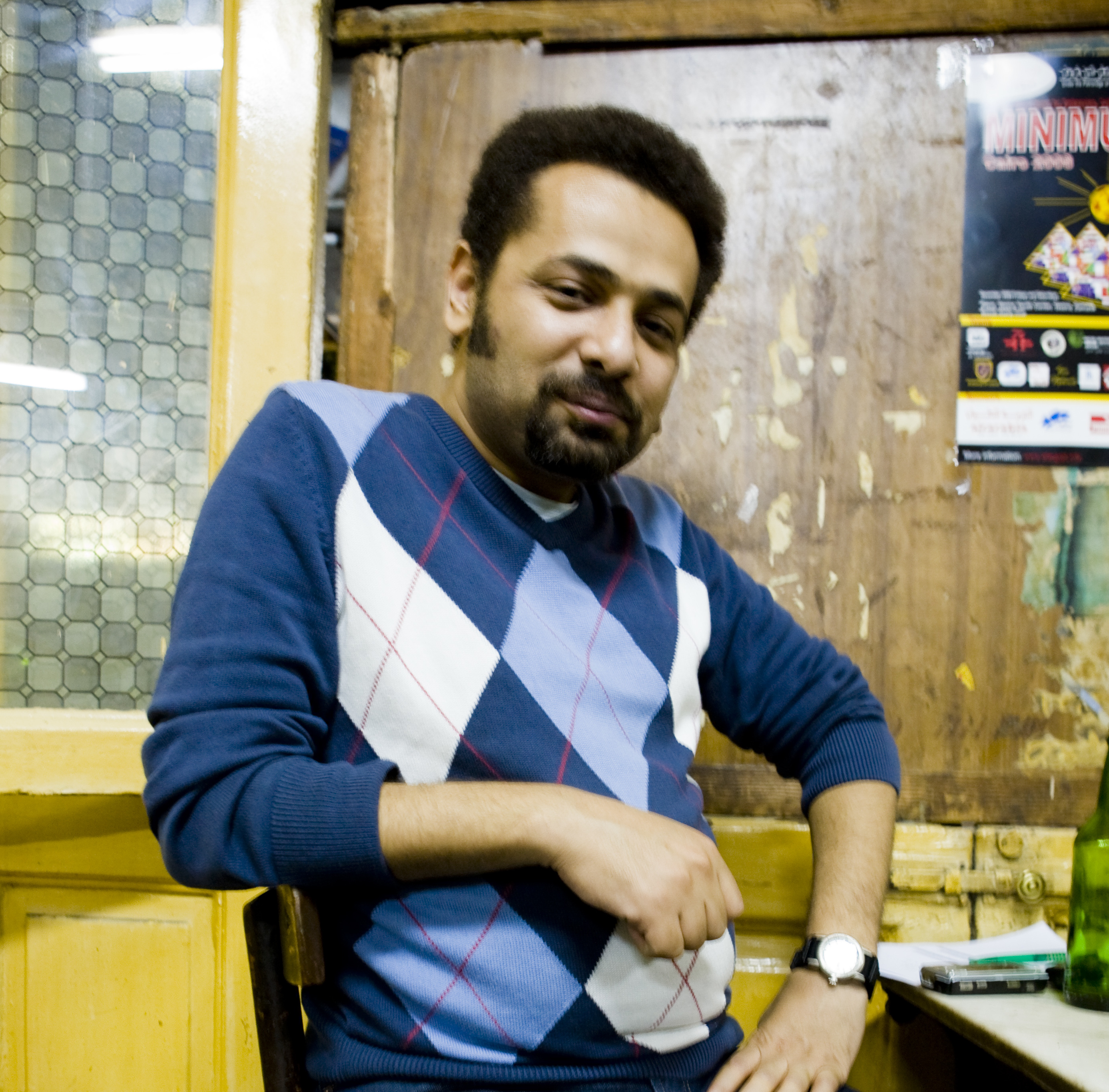

Personal details
- Born: 14 November 1974 (age 51) Egypt
- Occupation: blogger, writer and human rights activist
- Website: misrdigital.blogspirit.com

Wael Abbas Bilal (Arabic: وائل عباس, IPA: [ˈwæːʔel ʕæbˈbæːs]) (born 14 November 1974 in Egypt) is an internationally renowned Egyptian journalist, blogger, and human rights activist, who blogs at Misr Digital (Egyptian Awareness). He reported an incident of mob harassment of women, and broadcast several videos of police brutality. His actions led to the conviction of police for torture, but he has been harassed by the Egyptian government.

== Accounts shut down by YouTube, Yahoo, and Twitter ==
In September 2007, his YouTube account was shut down. All the videos he had sent to YouTube were no longer available. They included videos of police brutality, voting irregularities and anti-government protests. About 12 or 13 were of violence in police stations. He was shocked by YouTube's decision.

Yahoo had shut down two of his email accounts, accusing him of being a spammer.

Human rights groups said that YouTube was shutting down a useful source of info on abuses in Egypt just as the government was increasing its crackdown on independent and opposition journalists. Twelve Egyptian journalists had been jailed between September and November 2007. Elijah Zarwan thinks that it was unlikely YouTube was reacting to official government pressure.

YouTube initially restored his account but not his videos, and said that his account was blocked because he failed to provide sufficient context about the violence. 187 of his videos were subsequently restored. Abbas has posted on his blog that Yahoo has restored his email account.

YouTube stated Abbas was banned "because the context was not apparent." The statement did not clarify whether they decided the missing context warranted the prompt ban, or whether the missing context misled them. It did conclude that Abbas should upload "with sufficient context."

In December 2017, Twitter suspended his account for violating its rules, but did not specify which rules had been broken or indicate whether the suspension was temporary or permanent.

== Arrests ==
On 15 January 2010 Abbas was arrested by Egyptian police along with 29 other human rights activists who had traveled to Nag Hammadi to pay condolences to the families of the victims of the Nag Hammadi massacre. The activists were detained and interrogated by the prosecutor of the Qena Governorate. A number of them were charged with demonstrating illegally, chanting slogans against the state, and causing disorder. Group members denied these allegations, stating that Egyptian police arrested them when they arrived at the train station, and that the group could not have had time to engage in any activities.

In the early hours of 23 May 2018 Abbas was taken by police from his home to state security offices, where he was charged with "involvement in a terrorist group", "spreading false news" and "misuse of social networks".

== Guest appearances ==
- Abbas was a guest panelist on The Doha Debates' episode broadcast on BBC World News on 13 and 14 November 2010. The motion was: This House would prefer money to free elections. Abbas was against the motion and he won the debate.

== Awards and honors ==
- In 2008, Abbas turned down an invitation to meet with U.S. President George W. Bush.
- Abbas was announced the winner of a journalism award by the International Center for Journalists, on 24 August 2007.
- He also won the Human Rights Watch's Hellman/Hammett Award 2008.
- Abbas was named Middle East Person of the Year 2007 by CNN.
- He was considered one of the Most Influential People of 2006 by BBC.
- He won the Egyptians Against Corruption Award 2005/2006.
