= Ajam of Bahrain =

Ajam of Bahrain عجم البحرين (in Arabic) ایرانیان بحرین (in Persian)
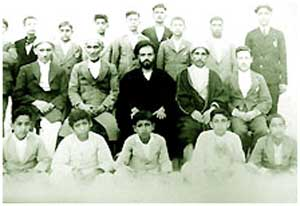
- Ajams/Iranian school in Bahrain 1939

Total population
- 225,000

Languages
- Persian dialects: Bushehri, Bahraini, Luri, Achomi, Other: Bahraini Gulf Arabic, Bahrani Arabic

Religion
- Shia Islam, Sunni Islam

Related ethnic groups
- Iranian diaspora (Iranians of UAE • Ajam of Qatar • Ajam of Iraq • 'Ajam of Kuwait • Iranians of Canada • Iranians of America • Iranians of UK • Iranians of Germany • Iranians of Israel • Iranians in Turkey)

The Ajam of Bahrain (Arabic: عجم البحرین), or Iranic Bahrainis (Persian: ایرانیان بحرین), are a collective of ethnic groups among Bahraini citizens of Western Iranian descent.

Most families in this group are of Shia background, although there are also Sunni families of Achomi, Kurdish، Many Ajam are bilingual, speaking Arabic and Persian. The Ajam are found in large numbers in both Manama and Muharraq. Their population is estimated at 225,000.

== Terminology ==
Historically Ajam (Singular: Ajami) was applied to those from a Persian-speaking background locally, similarly to its historical use. However, nowadays, any non-Arab is referred to as an Ajam. Musa Al-Ansari states that this term originally referred to non-Arabs of a Persian-speaking (or derivative; i.e., Achomi) background, as they were the only non-Arabic speakers in Bahrain, but due to the increase of other non-Arab/non-Arabic speaking ethnicities and people (such as Asians), he claims to have "reservations" about it due to its wide meaning. While some find this term to be derogatory due to its negative historical use context, some Sunni "Khodmooni" Iranians claim it is only for those of a Shia background, whilst they have been referred to as "Ajam" in the past, similar to the situation in Kuwait, others do not reject or deny it.

== Demographics ==
The Ajams, or Iranians of Bahrain, are the descendants of Iranians who immigrated to Bahrain as early as the 6th century BCE. The term, however, generally refers to those who arrived between the 19th & 20th centuries (1801–2000 CE) from the southern provinces of Iran, including Fars province, Bushehr province, Hormozgan province, Bandar Abbas, Bander Langeh, Kohgiluyeh and Boyer Ahmad province, Khoramshahr, and Lorestan.

=== Ethnic groups ===
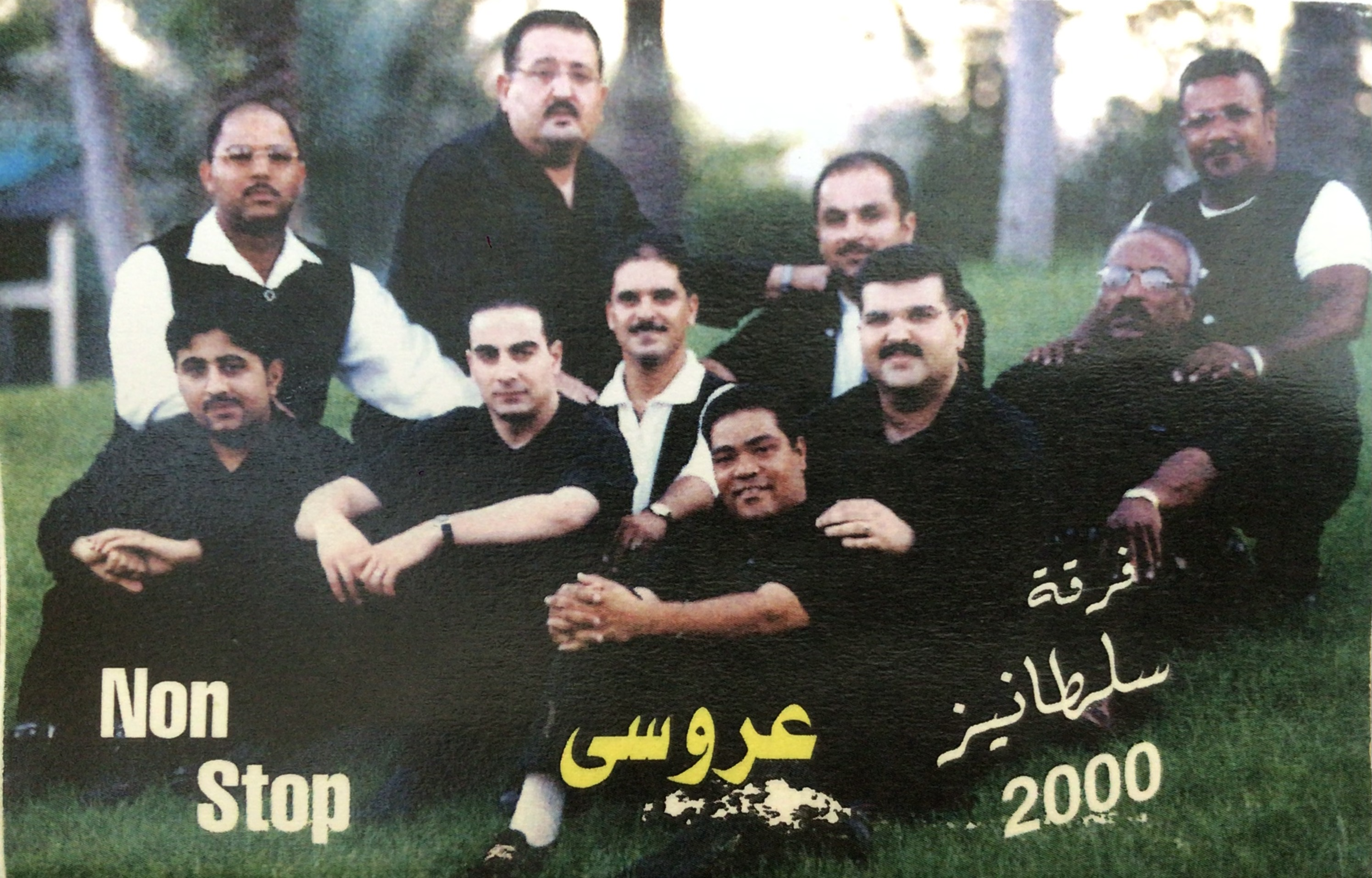
The Sultanies Band illustrates some of the ethnic diversity of the migrants who migrated from Iran to Bahrain

The Ajam possess many different ethnic backgrounds, reflecting the diverse peoples of their parent country, including (but not limited to):

Iranian/contemporary Iran's (western Iranic) peoples:

- Persian People:
  - Achums/Khodmoonis (Persian: مَردُم اَچُمی): Iranian people who migrated from the southern Iranian historical province known as Irahistan. Locally, they are referred to as "Khodmooni" (Persian: خودمونی); those with a Sunni background refer to themselves as "Huwala" (Arabic: هوله), who were also known as 'Ajams,' and those with a Shia background refer to themselves as "Ajam" (Arabic: عجم) or "Bastaki." "Khodmooni" or "Ajam" or "Huwala" is used interchangeably to denote them also. The "Ajam" group among them speaks "Bushehri-derived Farsi dialect" as migrations from Bushehr, Bandar Abbas, and Bandar Lengeh happened at approximately the same time. While the Shia Khodmoonis were originally Sunnis, they later converted.
  - Basseris (Persian: مَردُم باصری). Likely from Fars province, from counties like Abadeh, Eqlid, Pasargad, Jahrom, Marvdasht, Shiraz, Khorrambid, Larestan, and Sarvestan.
- Lurs (Persian: مَردُم لُر): likely from Ganaveh County, Deylam County, Dashtestan County, Dashti, Jam, Tangestan, and other areas of Bushehr, and Kohgiluyeh and Boyer Ahmad, and Lorestan. They are predominantly Shia.
  - Bakhtiaris.
  - Mamasani.
  - Possibly Behbehani/Bahbahani Lurs or Lurs from Bahbahan.
- Kurds (Kurdish: کورد, romanized: Kurd). Said to have begun migrating since World War 1 to avoid the violence and turmoil of southeastern Turkey. They are 93.99% Sunni Muslims.
- Azeris/Iranian Azeris: Predominantly Shias. Azerbaijanis are best described as Iranian peoples who adopted a Turkic language due to historical "elite dominance." They retain a predominantly Iranian genetic base, with minor Central Asian (18~33% Turkic/Mongol) ancestry.

Other Iranic people:

- Parsis: Descendants of Zoroastrian Iranians who fled prosecution during the Islamic conquest of Iran and migrated to India, some of whom have migrated to Bahrain. They speak Gujarati, whilst Avestan is used as a liturgical language.
- Iranis: Descendants of Zoroastrian Iranians who migrated from Qajar-era Iran to British India in the 19th and 20th centuries, some of whom have migrated to Bahrain. They are predominantly Zoroastrian and speak Zoroastrian Dari (North-Western Iranian Persian dialect).

Other ethnic groups from Iran that may be/have been classified as part of the broader "Ajam Community":

- Qashqai Turks. Predominantly Shias.
- Minabis (referred to locally as Arabic: الميناوية, romanized: Al-Minawyah), who originate from Minab.

Other groups with Iranian migration history:

- Arabic-speaking groups
  - Khuzestani Arabs (From Khorramshahr and Ahvaz).
  - Hawala Arabs.
- Afro-Iranians: from Minab, Beshagard, and possibly a few from Bandar Abbas.
- Sayyids of Iranic descent like the Al-Alawi (Alavi), Al-Mosawi (Mosavi), and other families.

=== Genetics ===
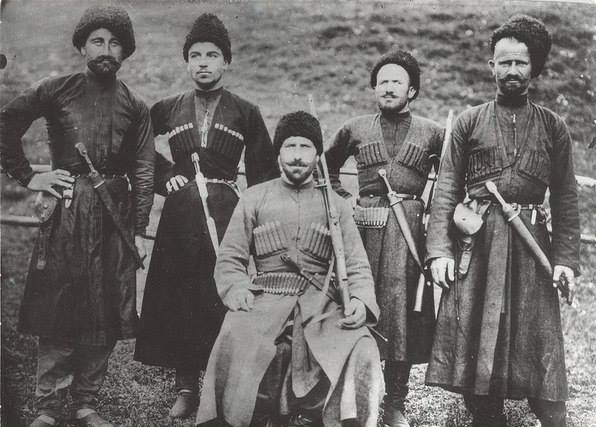
88.8% in Ingush people

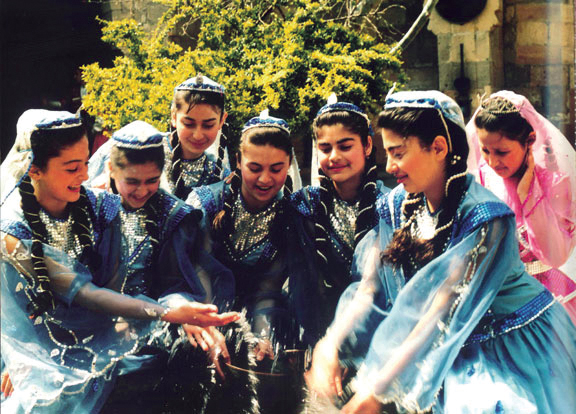
24%–48% in Azeris

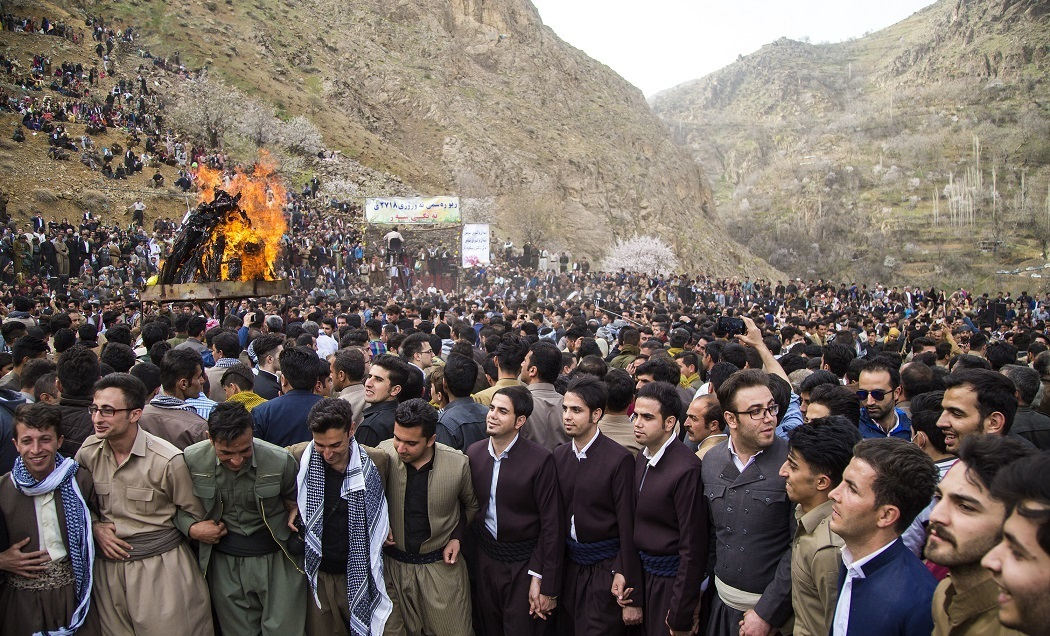
28.4% in Kurds

J2 Haplogroup Levels per ethnic group

According to paternal haplogroup predictions of 2020:

The majority of Bahrainis are on the J2 Haplogroup, which corresponds to Caucasian, Anatolian, or Western Iranian (32000 ybp) origins, encompassing 27.6% of the sample, followed by:

- J1 (23.0%; most common in Bedouin of Negev, Sudan, and Yemen).
- E1b1b (8.9%; most common in East Africa).
- E1b1a (8.6%; most common in West and Central Africa)
- R1a (8.4%; some Eurasian origin; commonly found in Brahmins of India; 72.22%, Pakistan's Mohana, and Tehranis; 20%).
- Other predicted haplogroups (G, T, L, R1b, Q, R2, B2, E2, H and C) occurring at progressively lower frequencies.

The Northern and Capital Governorates, where the Baharna and Ajam are most located, show higher frequencies of haplogroup J2 (34% and 31%) than in Muharraq and the Southern Governorate (both 17%), J1 is most frequent in the Southern Governorate (27%) where the highest proportion of Arabs live, as well as in the Muharraq Governorate (27%) where many migrant Huwala Arabs resettled. It declines to its lowest frequency in the Northern and Capital Governorates (21% and 19%). The Ajams and Baharnah of the Northern Governorate of Bahrain (particularly Manamah) show a high genetic continuity from the Tylos period.

== History ==
Iranian migration to Bahrain can be traced back as early as the Sassanid and Achaemenid Persian Empire, though there has been a more constant level of migration in recent centuries, primarily that of Persian Shi'ites.

=== Pre-Islamic period ===
From the 6th century BCE to the 3rd century BCE, Bahrain was an integral part of the Persian Empire during the Achaemenid dynasty. The Greeks referred to it as "Tylos," a hub for pearl trading, a name that emerged after Nearchus discovered the island while serving under Alexander the Great. From the 3rd century BCE to the 7th century CE, when it came under the influence of Islam, the island was controlled by two Iranian dynasties, the Parthians and the Sassanids. In the 3rd century CE, the Sassanids succeeded the Parthians and controlled the area for four centuries until the Arab conquest. The contemporary Island of Bahrain was referred to as Mishmahig, which in Middle-Persian/Pahlavi means "ewe-fish."

Historians say that Bahrain was inhabited by partially-Christianized Arabs, Aramaic-speaking agriculturalists, Persian Zoroastrians, and a small number of Jews. Robert Bertram Serjeant believes that the Baharna (Arabic: بحارنه) may be the last of the "descendants of converts from the original population of Christians (Aramaeans), Jews and ancient Zoroastrian Persians (Referred to as "Majus" by Early Muslim Arabs) inhabiting the island and cultivated coastal provinces of Eastern Arabia at the time of the Arab conquest." Islamic narrations claim that Bahrain was predominantly a Zoroastrian country before the Arab conquest, and that Mohammed took the Jizya from them.

The Bahraini population is said to have spoken Syriac and Persian (likely Parthian and Middle "Pahlavi" Persian) at the time. Bahrain's old population is said to have also had a Persian clergy (Zoroastrians) who used Syriac as a language of liturgy and writing more generally.

These sentiments are supported by archaeology as archaeologists uncovered Parthian (247 BCE – 224 CE) artefacts in Shakhura, and remains of a Christian church in Samaheej, dating back to the mid-4th and mid-8th centuries.

=== Modern migrations ===
It is claimed that Persians settled in Hormuz and Bahrain during the conflict between the Portuguese and the Persian Empire over control of Bahrain (1507 to 1625).

In my estimation, the Ajam (Persians) were present before the period specified by Bushehri. At the end of the 16th century and the beginning of the 17th century, the Gulf was calm and stable socially, politically, and economically, even in terms of trade. Movement between the Persian shores occurred peacefully and without any problems. Naturally and quietly, Arab tribes migrated eastward to the Arabian Gulf, and Persian groups came to the western Arab shores without any issues.
When did problems begin? When colonial powers arrived—specifically the Portuguese. During this period, there was a state called "Hormuz," about 12 miles from the Gulf's shores. There was a struggle over who would rule it: the Persians or the Portuguese. It was economically active but weak in governance. When it felt threatened by the Portuguese, it sought refuge with Abbas the Safavid, meaning the Safavids, and when the opposite happened, it sought refuge with the Portuguese. Hormuz controlled the entire Omani coast. It occupied Bahrain and several other regions in the Arabian Gulf. The Portuguese competed to assert their control over Hormuz, Bahrain, and all the territories under its authority.
I believe the Persians were present in Bahrain for these reasons as well, even if in small numbers. Subsequent political events increased their presence. Not all migrations were political. The Safavid state was an ambitious state. No one denies that it had colonial ambitions in Bahrain. Consequently, some migrations were motivated by colonial objectives. The Portuguese and Ottomans were the same in this regard, meaning that while there were migrations driven by livelihood, fleeing oppression, and seeking safety, there were also organized migrations for colonial political purposes.

— Mahmoud Al-Qassab, in Al-Waqt, History of the Persian race in Bahrain, Page 20-23

It is claimed that after the decline of the Safavid Empire (1501–1736), which was nearly destroyed by Pashtun armies, Persian Sunnis played a significant role in setting up Sunni governance in Bahrain. Persian Sunni (Achomi/Ajam) communities in Bahrain, alongside the Howala Arab tribes, took control of the island, establishing a Sunni-dominated rule.

Between 1772 and 1773, a certain plague spread in the Gulf region, including Bahrain, killing around 2 Million people in the region.

The Qajar dynasty began ruling Iran in 1789, founded by Mohammad Khan (r. 1789–1797) of the Qoyunlu clan of the Turkoman Qajar tribe.

Migrations occurred at different historical periods. The number began to increase significantly in the year 1850, and due to the natural problems that the Iranian arena faced, such as lack of rain and famine, this led to migration to Bahrain. In my opinion, no one leaves his homeland, land and tribe unless he is forced to.

— Dr. Ali Akbar Bushehri, in Al-Waqt, History of the Persian race in Bahrain, Page 8

Waves of famine, cholera and smallpox outbreaks as well as increased crime rates accompanying drought led to a large-scale migration to Bahrain around 1850.

It was around this time that Sheikh Muhammad bin Khalifah Al Khalifa asked for Iranian protection against Wahabbis in 1851 and declared his preparedness to be a Qajar Iran protectorate. However, the British forced him to become their protectorate.

==== First generation (1860-1910) ====
The period between 1860 and 1910 is considered the "first generation" migration by some. It includes places like Bushehr, Bandar Abbas, Bandar Langeh Mohammerah (Khorramshahr), and Lorestan.

In 1860, the Bushehri family migrated to Bahrain.

During the early 20th century, the Iranian central government imposed new import and export taxes, The introduction of taxes was an effort to reinforce the authority of the Iranian state and draw revenue from affluent peripheral areas like Bandar Lingeh and Bushehr, which were key economic hubs in the Persian Gulf during the late 19th and early 20th centuries. Migrants, familiar with the region, circumvented these restrictions by choosing alternative routes. To escape the heavy taxation, many merchants simply relocated to the other side, a practice that had been common for centuries due to the familiarity of the region, prompting the migration of tens of thousands of people from southern Iran to the opposite shores. Bahrain became a primary destination for these migrants, leading to a significant increase in its Iranian population. This period also saw heightened British involvement in the region.

In the early 20th century, Bahrain was struck by several major epidemic waves, most notably plague outbreaks in 1903, 1907, and 1925, remembered locally as the "Years of Mercy" (Sanawat al-Rahma) due to the scale of death. According to records from the American Mission Hospital, these outbreaks caused around 9,690 deaths, a devastating figure relative to Bahrain's population at the time. Many Ajams worked in the American Hospital. Other diseases such as smallpox and cholera also affected the island. These epidemics impacted all communities in Bahrain, including the Ajam population, who, as part of the country's urban and coastal society, experienced the same demographic losses and social disruption. Bahrain was also among the earliest Gulf states to implement organized quarantine measures, including the "Karantina" isolation station at Halat Bu Maher.

In 1904, anti-Persian rioting broke out in the markets of Manama, marking the first recorded instance of local resistance against migrants in Bahrain. The British labeled the incident as "anti-Persian" and subsequently took control over the affairs of Iranian migrants in Bahrain. In response, the Iranian central government requested British assistance to ensure justice for its citizens in Bahrain. According to Lindsey Stephenson, speaker for the Ajam Media Collective, this request was a temporary measure rather than an attempt to permanently cede jurisdiction, reflecting the historically fluid and overlapping borders in the Persian Gulf region.

According to Dr. Ali Akbar Bushehri, in the year 1905, the Ajam of Bahrain were estimated to be around 1650.

By 1909, the British who were treating Iranians as foreigners in need of British protection, had convinced the Sheikh of Bahrain (Isa bin Ali Al Khalifa) to oversee the Iranian migrants after spending five years trying to convince him they were foreigners, even though the Iranians (of Bahrain) themselves had not sought such protection. This shift marked the introduction of new territorialized identities in the Persian Gulf, replacing earlier conceptions of belonging that were based on familial ties rather than geographic origin. The British court system reinforced this "spatial awareness", bringing a legal and official understanding of belonging that was increasingly tied to territorial boundaries. Despite the British designation of Iranians as foreigners, the Sheikh of Bahrain viewed them as part of his subjects, prioritizing their economic contributions over any concern about their origins.

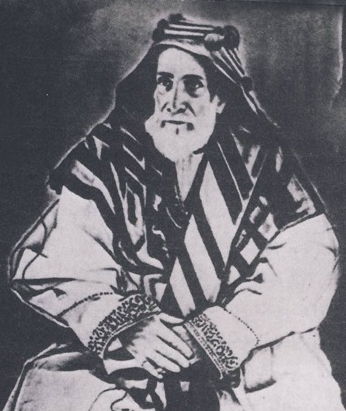
Shaikh Isa bin Ali Al Khalifa (1848–1932)

In 1910, the local Iranian community funded and opened a private school, Al-Ittihad school (Persian: دبستان اتحاد ملی, romanized: Dabistan Ittihad Melli, lit. 'National Union Primary School'), that taught Persian, besides other subjects. It is considered one of the earliest, if not the first, schools to be opened in Bahrain. Between 1910 and 1919, in the absence of state-run schools on the islands, some Bahrainis attended Al-Ittihad, contributing to the development of modern education in the region. It had a secular approach influenced by the Pahlavi dynasty up until the 1979 Revolution.

During World War I (1914–1918), some Kurds are said to have migrated from southeastern Turkey to Bahrain to avoid the violence and conflict.

==== Second generation (1920s–1930) ====
Between 1919 and 1923, members of the Iranian community asked the government to require teaching Persian (Farsi) as part of the curriculum in all schools, but this was rejected.

The second wave of pre-revolutionary Iranian emigration to the Arab littoral built upon the first and was largely driven by Reza Shah's efforts to consolidate control over autonomous and restive provinces during the 1920s and 1930s. Following the overthrow of the Qajar dynasty, Reza Shah extended his authority over southern ports and nearby islands. In 1924, he subdued the Arab rulers of Khuzestan, an oil-rich region, and by 1928, his forces had taken control of Hengam Island, establishing a customs post that challenged the Dubai-aligned local leadership.

Map of Manama in 1926; note some areas named after Ajam clans/origins

Reza Shah also sought to modernize and secularize the region, continuing measures initiated by the Qajars in the 1880s. These efforts included increased taxation, enforcing Western-style clothing, and banning traditional beards—changes that were met with resistance from many Iranians aiming to preserve their Muslim identity. Additionally, the Shah mandated the use of standardized Persian (Farsi) in schools, replacing Arabic, and sought to diminish the influence of what one source described as a distinctly Arab culture in areas like written deeds.

Economic difficulties and unpopular policies prompted many Iranians, including Baluch families, to emigrate, and seeking better opportunities abroad. Communities from Khorramshahr to Lengeh left Iran during this period, unable to maintain their traditional way of life and language. This migration laid the foundation for the growing Iranian diaspora in the Persian Gulf.

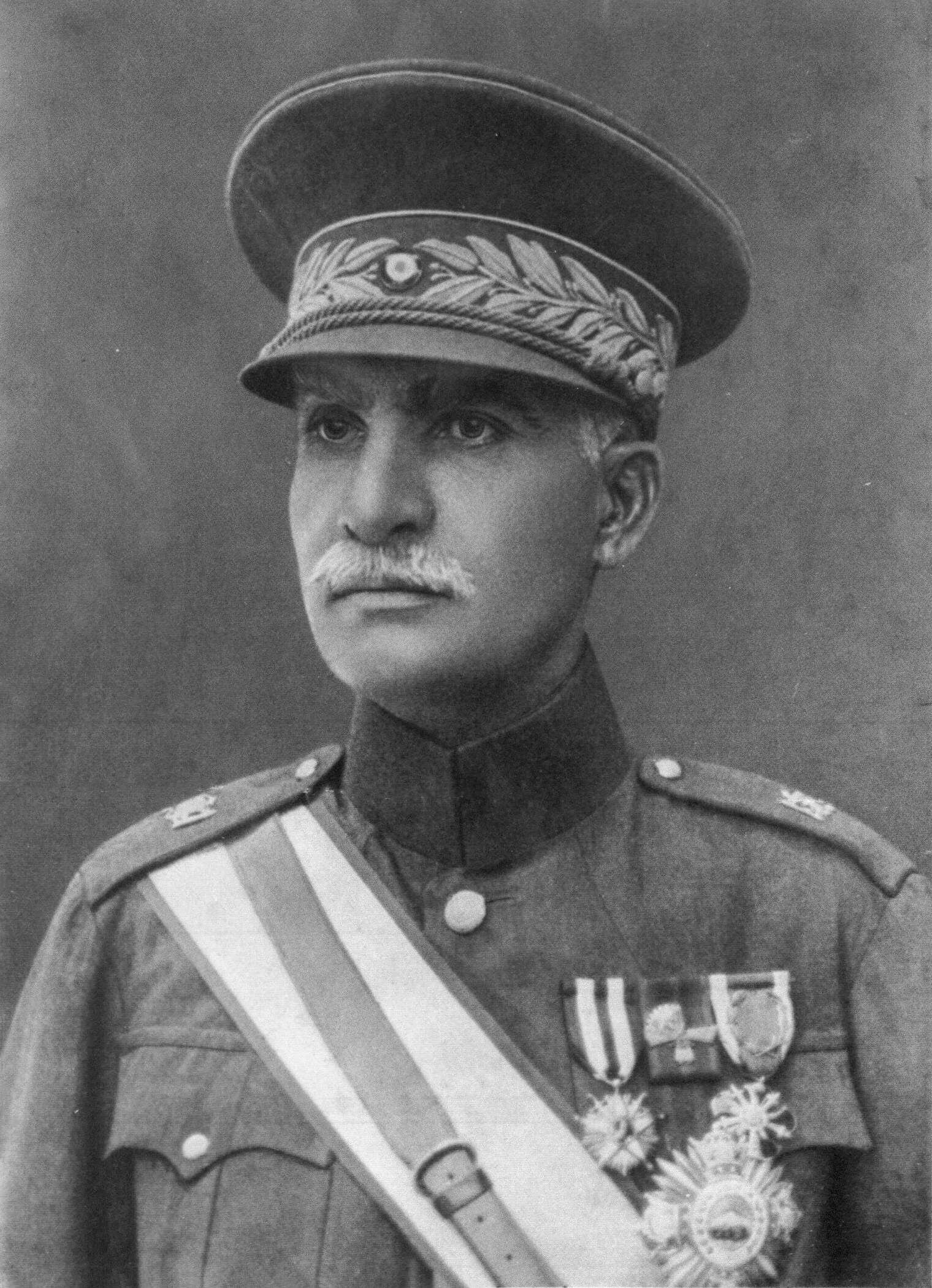
Reza Shah, Shah of Iran from 1925 to 1941

Between 1920 and 1940, before World War II, more families migrated from Bushehr to Bahrain to avoid the on-going conflict between Reza Shah and the English.

In the 1920s, nationalism was sweeping through the Ajam community in Bahrain, inspired by Reza Shah's rise to power in 1925 and his modernizing efforts, which promised to bring Iran closer to contemporary standards of living. By the late 1920s, the Iranian schools in Bahrain had intensified their nationalist activities to a controversial level. The Ajams of Bahrain began to fear that should pressure be put on Iran or another Persian Gulf nation, the effects would fall Bahrain's Iranians.

After Reza Shah came to power, and the nationalist policy he had, there was a fear of the Ajams (Persians) in Bahrain. Anything that happened in Iran that was disturbing to Bahrain or the Gulf, the pressure would come directly on us Iranians in Bahrain. This is a characteristic we have become accustomed to and almost always prepared for in the face of any crisis between any party in Iran and any party in the Gulf. This has always been a constant in our history.

— Dr. Ali Akbar Bushehri, in Al-Waqt, History of the Persian race in Bahrain, Page 44-45

According to the Persian newspaper Shafagh-i Sorkh ("The Red Sunset"), on 5 December 1928, the principals of these schools were summoned by the consul, who conveyed that playing drums and fifes was prohibited by the Bahraini government, and the Persian flag was not to be displayed on certain occasions.

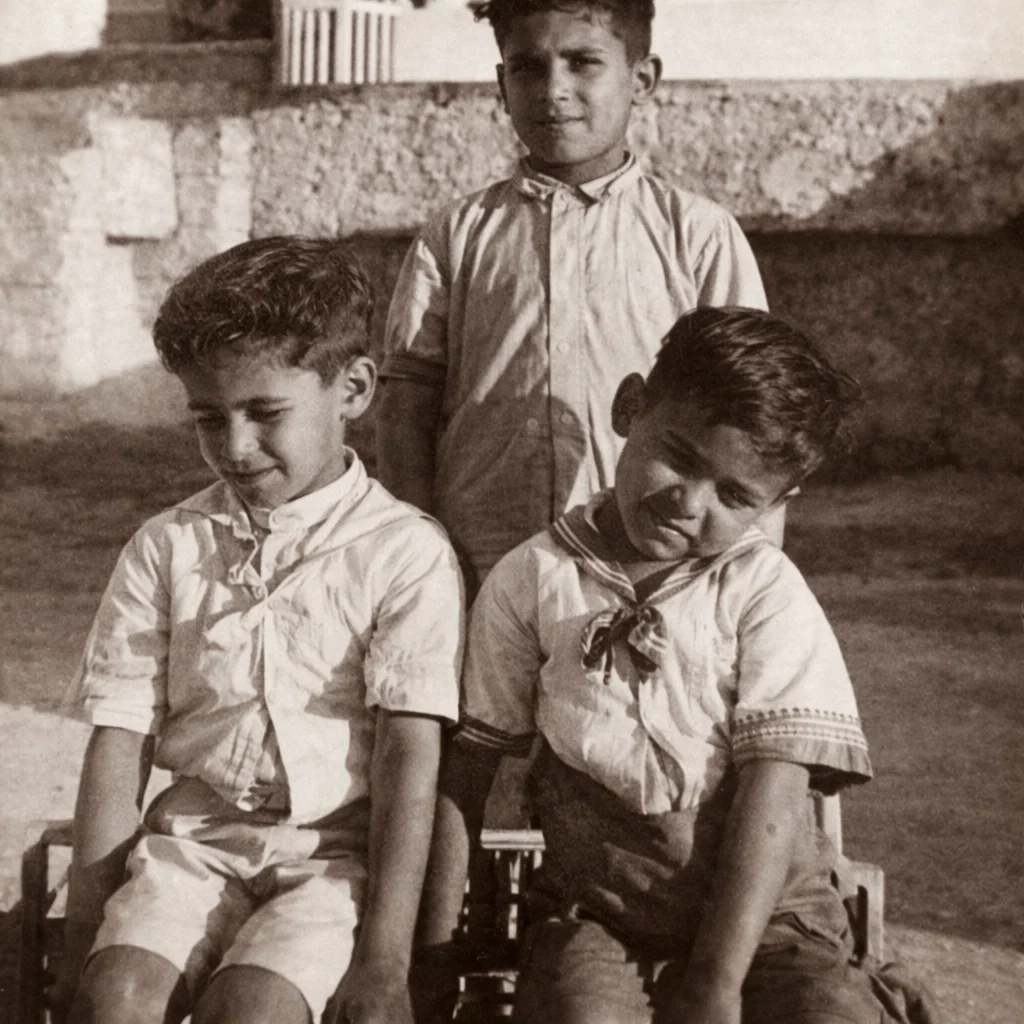
Al-Awadiyya (Evazia) Kids, 1932, Bahrain

Most modern migration of Iranians to Bahrain started around the year 1928, according to the oldest document they had in 2009, but this doesn't mean they didn't exist before this period, recounts Dr. Ali Akbar Bushehri.

During the 1930s, some conservative Sunni families migrated from Iran to Bahrain due to the fear of Reza Shah's imposed "Kashf-e hijab" law and what these families perceived as an "extreme secularism against religion" comparable to "Atatürk."

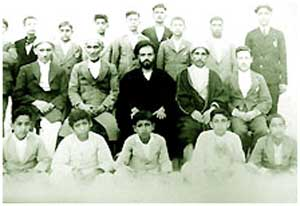
Iranian School in Bahrain 1939

In 1931, the two Iranian schools in Bahrain merged into a single institution named Madrase-ye Ittiḥād-e Mellī (also known as Ittiḥādi-ye Iranian or Ittiḥādiyeh), and continued to operate under this name until 1970. While the school's ownership was not officially transferred to the Iranian embassy until 1970, it had already adopted a strong Iranian nationalist identity by the late 1920s. By 1932, British sources described the Iranian school as a center of Iranian nationalism, with frequent parades where the Iranian flag was prominently flown and students were required to wear traditional Iranian hats.

In 1941, Mohammad Reza Pahlavi became the Shah of Iran.

==== Third generation (1950s–1970s) ====
The period of 1950 to 1970 is classified as "third generation" migration.

Between the time period of the 1950s and 1970s, Gulf Iranians sought citizenship in Bahrain and the United Arab Emirates (UAE) due to economic and cultural factors. During this period, the economies of Bahrain and the UAE were experiencing rapid growth, driven by the oil boom and expanding trade networks. These developments offered better employment opportunities, access to education, and improved healthcare compared to Iran, where economic challenges and limited industrialization in some regions prompted migration. Citizenship in Bahrain and the UAE provided Gulf Iranians with access to emerging state benefits and business opportunities, fostering their integration into these wealthier Gulf states.

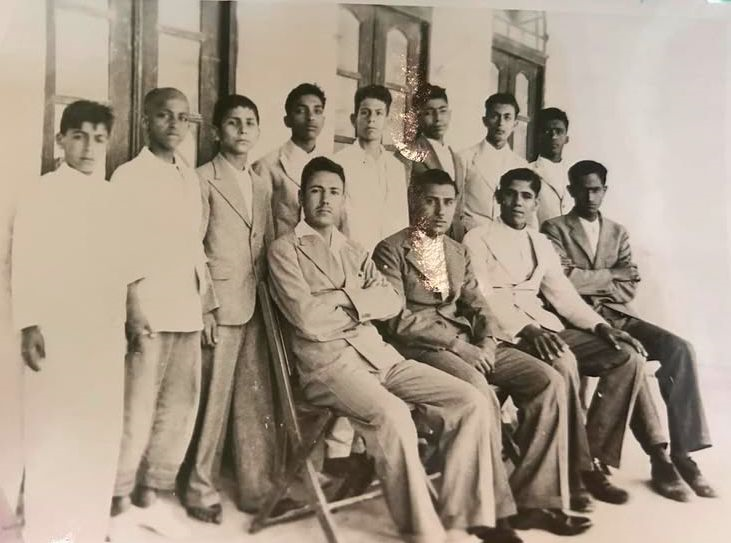
The Secular Ajam/Iranian School (1950), third from right Habib Hussain Bushehri, first from left Kareem Agha Bushehri, sitting; Mohammed Hatel and Ali Dashti

During Bahrain's political strife in the 1950s, many Gulf Iranians began accepting Bahraini citizenship, as well as citizenship in the United Arab Emirates. Some segments of the community reportedly severed ties with their country of origin.

Between 1950s–1960s, Arab nationalism was advocated by Gamal Abdel Naser, as means of fighting colonialism.

The increasing sense of Arab identity led to inter-sectarian Arab gatherings, driven by Hawala merchants whose education and experiences abroad had introduced them to the ideas of pan-Arabism and nationalism.

The mid-1950s uprising and the labour protests of the mid-1960s linked Bahrain's destiny to the rise of Arab nationalism, led by Egyptian President Gamal Abdel Nasser. A significant achievement of the nationalist movement was the removal of Charles Belgrave, who had come to symbolize unwelcome Western colonial interference in the affairs of an Arab nation.

In 1950, the Bahrain Hotel was opened by Sheikh Abdul Noor Al-Bastaki, known for establishing the first hotel in Bahrain. Locals still refer to it as "Abdul Noor’s Hotel", and its construction had started in the 1920s.

On 12 November 1957, Iran declared Bahrain a province, with two parliamentary seats dedicated to it (in the early 1900s, one parliamentary seat was reserved for Bahrain). A year later, in 1958, Sheikh Salman bin Hamad Al Khalifa (ruler of Bahrain) pledged allegiance to Iran.

In the 1960s, the Shah turned his focus to southern Iran. He initiated road and port construction projects in the region to generate employment and established Persian language schools and hospitals both within Iran and in the Persian Gulf Arab States to strengthen ties between Iranian expatriates and their homeland. Additionally, the Shah significantly expanded Iran's military and weapons arsenal, emphasizing military service as a means of contributing to the state and demonstrating good citizenship.

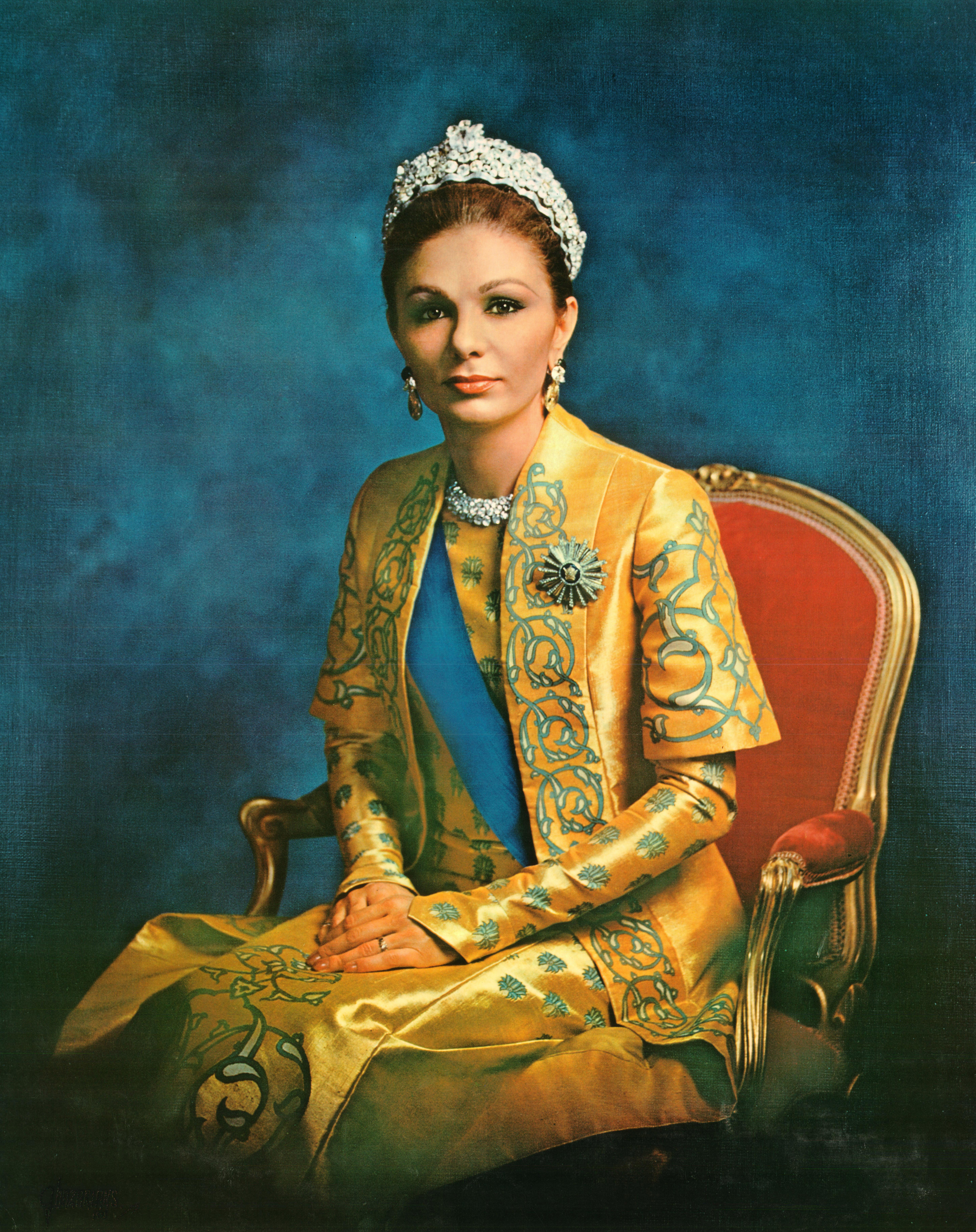
The late Mohammed Reza Shah, and his wife Farah Pahlavi, the former Queen of Iran

Despite the significant Gulf Iranian population in Dubai, pro-Iran demonstrations did not materialize during the dispute between Iran and the UAE over Abu Musa and the Tunb islands. When Emirati Arabs protested and destroyed Iranian property following Iran's repossession of the islands, UAE President Sheikh Zayed bin Sultan compensated the affected Gulf Iranians, who remained largely apolitical.

The Persian population of Bahrain was being gradually Arabized under British Control, which made the Shah more or less dismiss it, due to its Arab identity.

I went to vote as a Bahraini, but I do not want to lose my identity as a Persian.

— Musa Al-Ansari, in Al-Waqt, History of the Persian race in Bahrain, Page 51, 53

At 12:50 p.m. on 26 March 1970, London Radio announced that both Britain and Iran had submitted a request to the Secretary-General of the United Nations to send a representative from the international organization to survey the opinion of the people of Bahrain as to whether they wish to remain under British Protectorate or to have Independence or be part of Iran. Musa Al-Ansari recounts that he voted on the promise for the country to be an independent democratic country that respects minorities.

The shah felt he won Bahrain over. He understood there were two other options, either to keep things as they were and just cope, or to occupy Bahrain. Both options were beneath imperial Iran's dignity, and the world would not have accepted it either way.

— An Iranian Diplomat, in Saudi Arabia and Iran: Friends or Foes?, Page 97

By 1971, after Bahrain's independence, Gulf Iranians in Bahrain had become less overt in their nationalism. Across the Persian Gulf, Iranian communities generally aligned their political and national activities with the interests of the indigenous Arab populations.

=== Post Revolution ===
After the Iranian Revolution, Gulf Iranians, including both Iranian-descended Bahrainis and expatriates, remained politically inactive, particularly during the Iran-Iraq War. This inaction, aimed at avoiding conflicts with Gulf governments, earned some enmity from Bahrain's Arab Shi'a community for perceived indifference to local grievances.

Dr. Bushehri recounts that the "Khomeini Revolution" created a rift between the Ajams of Bahrain; initially, the majority of Bahraini Iranians were opposed to the Revolution, but they began to support it over time. However, they then realised that the fall of the Shah did not improve conditions, but merely covered them up with revolutionary and religious slogans:

We were proud of the revolution because it overthrew the Shah. It removed from us the worry of ambitions and expansion. But we got in new labyrinths and greed of a different kind wrapped in revolutionary and religious slogans.

— Mohammed Al-Qassab, in Al-Waqt, History of the Persian race in Bahrain, Page 97-98

Throughout the Iran-Iraq War (1980–1988), Gulf Iranians, especially in Dubai, played crucial roles in the region's economic life, regardless of their Shi'a background. Their focus on economic success rather than political activism became a recurring theme in observations of the community.

In 1993, the Persian "Isfahani Restaurant" was opened in Bahrain by two Persian brothers.

Between 1994 and 1999, the 1990s uprising in Bahrain took place in which leftists, liberals and Islamists joined forces to demand democratic reforms. Gulf Iranians refrained from addressing problems with the Bahraini government or engaging in inter-sectarian conflicts. Many were noted for their support of Gulf governments, countering claims that their loyalties might align strictly along sectarian lines.

After the Revolution in Iran, the Iranian School was renamed to "Islamic Republic School." At that time, the school was being funded and operated by the Iranian Ministry of Education. The 1979 Islamic Revolution in Iran led to a shift in the school's ideological framework and curriculum. Prior to the Revolution, the school followed a secular approach influenced by the Pahlavi dynasty for nearly 70 years. For over seventy-five years, the school has provided education to multiple generations in Bahrain. In 1996, the "Iranian school" was shut down by the Bahraini government.

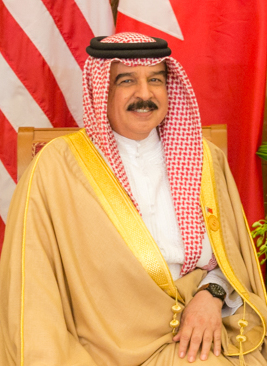
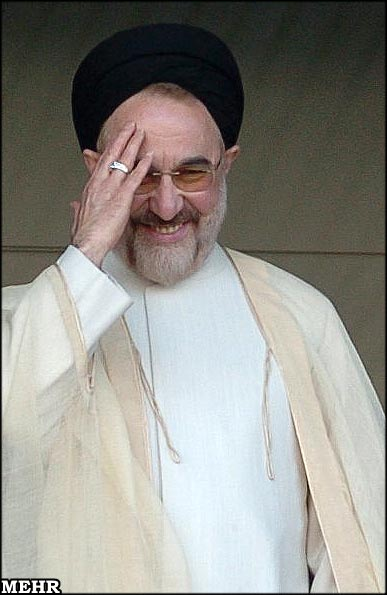
King Hamad Bin Isa (2017), and Mohammad Khatami (2006)

In 2002, Bahraini's King, Hamad Bin Isa, visited Iran and met with Mohammad Khatami and Iran's Supreme Leader, Ali Khamenei, which marked the first visit since the 1979 revolution, on the same year, he announced many of the Ajams of Bahrain as Bahraini citizens and granted them citizenships. He was gererally very welcoming of the Ajams, regardless of their background or ethnic group.

In 2003, Khatami visited Bahrain which marked the first visit of an Iranian president to Bahrain since 25 years, Khatami gave a lecture in the Arabic language at the Gulf Hotel in Manameh. Bushehri recounts "The place was buzzing with Ajams, support, and prayers. Me and two of my friends were there. Everyone raises their voices in prayer except for us. For the first time, I felt that I had become a minority among a minority. Three people, a minority among 1,500.

Where did we get this rigidity and fanaticism from? Why, and where did this rigidity come from in our social lives? We even think that we are in a constant state of conflict with joy and happiness, and the realm of prohibitions and taboos has expanded, and people's minds and awareness have been confiscated in the name of religion and sect.

— Mahmoud Al-Qassab, Deputy Secretary-General of the National Democratic Gathering Association, History of the Persian race in Bahrain,

The Bahraini people became considerably more religious after the 1979 Revolution in Iran and the growth of the Wahhabi movement in Saudi Arabia, growth that was strengthened by oil exports. Musa Al-Ansari recounts: "I do not know why the revolution took this character in Bahrain. The fanaticism that exists in Bahrain does not exist in Iran. In Iran, you will see people listening to music and songs, women in half-veils laughing in the street. Here you are an infidel if you listen to a cassette or hear singing. Bahrain is a completely different situation." Al-Qassab wonders, "where did we get all this fanaticism from?" to which Al-Ansari responds "From Islamic extremism."

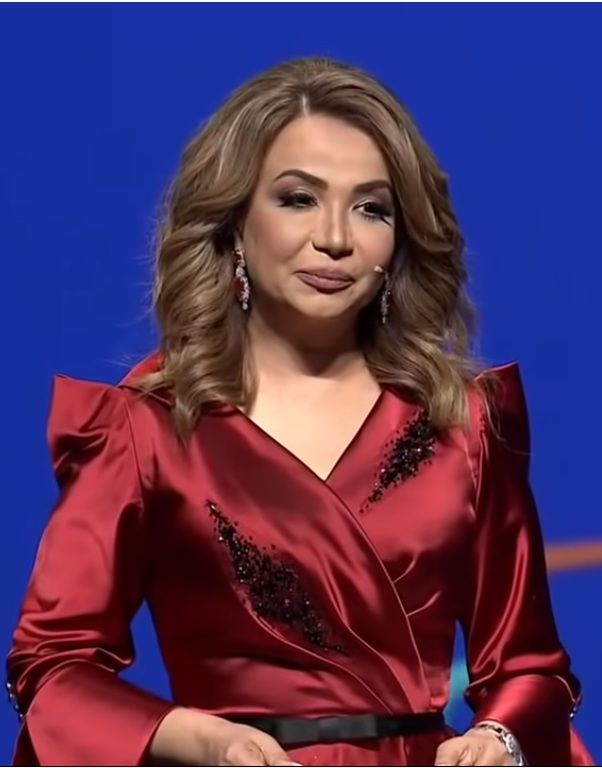
Bahraini Poet, Journalist and TV Host, Parvin Habib, presenting 2018 closing ceremony of Arab Reading Challenge.

In the year 2009, the Iranians of Bahrain were estimated to be around 20% of the local population. (Note: Estimated to be around 100 thousand.)

After Saudi diplomatic missions in Iran were ransacked by Iranian protesters following the execution of Nimr al-Nimr, Bahrain followed Saudi Arabia's decision by severing diplomatic relations with the Islamic Republic of Iran.

In 2024, Bahrain restored diplomatic relations with the Islamic Republic of Iran, however, any attempts to restore relations with Iran were sabotaged following their 2026 attacks on Bahrain.

The Ajams of Bahrain are now a largely secular, inclusive people.

== Issues ==
They accuse us of not having loyalty. What do they mean, that we have no loyalty? The aggressor will not differentiate between an Arab and a non-Arab. We must all defend this land. That brings us together.

— Nasser Hussein,

Ajams/Persians/Iranians of Bahrain face discrimination and racism, and can have their loyalty questioned. Sectarian conflicts following the Islamic revolution of Iran, 2011 events, along with Islamic extremism, attributed to divisions among the Ajams of Bahrain.

While students in Iran study Formal Arabic, Bahrainis of Iranian origin or ancestry (whatever their background) cannot study Persian (Farsi), or any Iranian language, the suggestion was made between 1919 and 1923 and ignored. Citizenship laws in the Gulf Arab states currently mandate prolonged residency and a satisfactory proficiency in Arabic as prerequisites for applying for citizenship. This can indefinitely extend the stateless status of many Gulf Iranians, particularly those facing linguistic or other challenges. Furthermore, online content about the country's Persian minority is virtually absent, and media outlets are forbidden from using the Persian language or addressing Persian culture. This may explain why many families of Iranian descent chose not to teach their children their ethnic language as a first tongue.

One of the key reasons behind the Bahraini government's promotion of an "Arab identity" framework among its population is to mitigate its deep-rooted historical ties with Iran and its Persian community (Ajam), as well as the indigenous Arab Shi'a (Baharna). The intertwined history of Bahrain and Iran, along with their respective peoples, dates back to at least the 5th century BCE during the Achaemenid Empire. Over the centuries, both regions have vied for control of the Persian Gulf, with influence shifting back and forth since pre-Islamic times. Notably, during the Sassanian Empire, parts of the Arabian Peninsula and Iraq, now predominantly Arab-controlled, were once under Iranian rule. The Gulf Arab states have focused on cultural autonomy and preserving a distinctly Arabian and Islamic national identity, as evidenced by their national constitutions. Furthermore, the ruling families of the Persian Gulf have removed all traces of their transnational connections from their national narratives. In the Persian Gulf today, public discourse regarding the Persian, Indian, and African mothers of former shaykhs and shaykhas is heavily discouraged. Gulf nationals who cannot trace their ancestry to Arabian origins and tribal affiliations are typically excluded from high-ranking government positions, while those with no Arab lineage are often limited to the most junior roles. The notable exceptions to this trend seem to be Oman and, since 2000, Bahrain. Additionally, Shi'i Arabs face varying degrees of discrimination depending on the state. Consequently, a historian relying on the accounts of a Gulf Arab family is likely to encounter a curated history that serves contemporary interests.

Shias in Bahrain or people of a Shia background in general (including Bahranis, and Shia Ajams) face discrimination, and are often called "Majoos" (an Arab word invented for the minority Zoroastrians. They accuse them of "worshipping fire" as well, because Zoroastrians worship the deity Ahuramazda at the Fire temple.). It is worth noting that the majority of Bahrain's Shia population are Bahrani people who are mostly (around 50%) eastern Arabs and (around 30%~) North West Asian (Iranian, Caucasian, and Mespotamian) according to their genes, and the two (Baharna and Ajams) can be often conflated by many. Those who view Shias as 'Iranian Majoos" often feel they are subservient to the Islamic Republic of Iran. This perception has also been prevalent among some Sunni (Khodmooni) Iranians. While they were also known as "Ajam" in the past, the Sunni Ajams do not face such discrimination, and many of them now identify as "Hawala" or Arab, and/or reject the term "Ajam." It is also noted that this group introduced Nationalism during the heyday of Gamal Abdel Naser as a means of fighting colonialism.

From the 1980s through the mid-2000s, many "Bidoon" Iranians were deported back to Iran, many of whom were working for BAPCO, the island's oil company, which claimed to be opening up more jobs for the native Bahraini population.

Based on a study in 2013, the linguistic and religious situation of Sunni Persians in Bahrain is complex and can be intentionally confused between "Hole\Hawala Arabs" and "Sunni Persians." They also claim that Sunni Achomis did not face any systematic racism. Some Sunni Achomis actively reject efforts to attribute Arab origins to their heritage.

In 2015, Al-Wasat columnist and journalist "Hani Al-Fardan" wrote an article in which he indirectly explained that many are changing family names for political or financial reasons: "[I]f one knew the original names and the names they changed to, they wouldn't be surprised."

In 2019, Dr. Abdullah Madani, writer of Al-Ayam newspaper and specialist in Asian affairs, describes in an article how a man of Bahraini of Persian origin once protested to him that he used his family name among the Ajams. Madani dedicated one of his articles to Iranian Ajam Bahrainis, especially Shiites. In his article "Kabir al-Ajam fe Al-Bahrain", he mentioned the name "Akbari" as one of the most famous Ajam families in Bahrain, as well as the names of many other families. Ismail Akbari (husband of writer Sosan Al-Shaer and father of Bahrain Consultative Council member Bassam Ismail Al-Bon Mohammad "Akbari") strongly protested, feeling the name "Ajam" refers only to Shias of Iranian origin, not Sunnis like his family, who are "Bastaki", not "Ajami".

In October 2024, the Arab Gulf States held their first joint meeting with the European Union in a considerable period. The meeting concluded with the EU affirming the position of the Persian Gulf countries that the islands of Abu Musa, Greater Tunb, and Lesser Tunb are sovereign territories of the United Arab Emirates. This development provoked a response from the Islamic Republic of Iran, in which Kamal Kharazi, head of Iran's Strategic Council on Foreign Relations claimed Bahrain's Iranian/Persian identity. In response, members of Bahrain's parliament rejected the claim, stating that Bahrain is historically Arab. and that Iran is merely trying to "export its internal crisis." This included statements from MP Members of Iranian ancestry, such as Mohammed Hassan Janahi, who reiterated that "all Bahrainis firmly stand with their country's Arab identity," and Mohamed Yousif Al-Maarafi who stated "Bahrain has been Arab since its founding." These statements reignited anti-Persian, anti-Iranian, and anti-Shia sentiments, with many resorting to the term "Majus" (مجوس) as a derogatory slur on social media. The specific target of this insult remains unclear, as the term has historically been used against Shias (including the indigenous Baharna), Shia Arab Iraqis, Iranians, and even Bahrain's Ajam community.

In March 2026, In Bahrain, a number of individuals accused of supporting the Islamic Revolutionary Guard Corps (IRGC), the Islamic Republic of Iran, or the doctrine of Wilayat al-Faqih were reported to have been involved in activities such as allegedly transmitting sensitive information and location data. Bahraini authorities arrested and imprisoned several of those accused, while some were later released. These incidents contributed to renewed sectarian tensions within the country, although many Bahrainis publicly emphasized national unity and reiterated that both Shia and Sunni communities are part of the same social fabric. In discussions surrounding these events, it has often been noted that the majority of those accused of alignment with pro-IRGC or pro-Iranian Islamist networks were identified as being of Bahrani Arab background, with little to no reported involvement from the Bahraini Iranic (Ajam) community. The death of Bahraini citizen Sarah Dashti, who herself is of Iranic descent, caused a huge community uproar, with no reaction from Iran whatsoever, which was followed by an uproar from Iranian government supporters, Iraqis, Yemenis, and Lebanese people of Shia backgrounds protesting the death of Bahraini political prisoner Sayed Mohammad Al-Mousawi, this led the government to promptly investigate the matter of his death, revealing that he was in prison due to having links to, and sending sensitive details to the IRGC, this was supported with photos of him holding photos of Iran's Supreme Leaders whilst in Prison.

== Languages ==
The Ajam speak southern Iranian languages and Farsi dialects distinctive to the cities they have originated from:

- Bahraini Farsi (known as "Ajami" locally): This dialect is identical to Bushehri dialect of Farsi (also known as New Persian). It is spoken by people of Bushehri origins (Lurs of Genaveh, Dashtis, minority Arabs), Shirazis, and some Achomis (perhaps particularly those of Shia background but not exclusively) too.
- Achomi/Laristani: known as "Khodmooni" in Bahrain, and sometimes referred to as "Ajami" or "Holi", a branch of the old Pahlavi "Middle" Persian (Pārsīk). This is the original tongue and language of the Achomi people.
- Luri: a branch of Middle "Pahlavi" Persian (Pārsīk). Original tongue of the Lur people. The Bushehri variants are similar to the Bahraini/Bushehri Farsi dialect.
- Parthian. It also has close ties to Avestan. Original tongue of the Baluch people.
- Turkic languages: Azeri and Qashqai.

Related languages:

- Bahraini Arabic (Distinct from "Bahrani Arabic" but with similarities): the main spoken Arabic dialect in Bahrain, both Bahraini and Bahrani have been influenced by local languages.

Below is a comparison chart of English, Modern Standard Arabic, Bahraini Arabic, Achomi, Standard New Persian, Bahraini/Bushehri New Persian, and Iranian/Tehrani New Persian:

=== Example Sentences ===
English	Modern Standard Arabic	Bahraini Arabic	Achomi	New Persian (Farsi)
What for?	Arabic: لماذا؟, romanized: lematha	Arabic: حگ شنو؟, romanized: hag sheno?	برا چه؟, brá cheh	Standard: برای چه؟, romanized: baráye che Bahraini: سی چه؟, romanized: Si cheh Tehrani: واسه چی؟, romanized: vaseh che
Do you want water?	Arabic: هل تريد ماء؟, romanized: hal turidu ma'a?	Arabic: تَبي ماي؟, romanized: taby mai?	او اخَی؟, ow akhi?	Standard: آیا شما آب می خواهید؟, romanized: Aaya shoma ab mekhaheed? Bahraini: اُو مي خای؟, romanized: ow mikhay Tehrani: آب میخوای؟, romanized: áb mikhái
He did not know what to do, suddenly he thought that he could go to the camel's home.	Arabic: لم يكن يعرف ماذا يفعل، فجأة فكر أنه يستطيع الذهاب إلى بيت الجمل., romanized: lam yakun yaerif madha yafeila, faj'atan fakar 'anah yastatie aldhahab 'iilaa bayt aljumli.	Arabic: ما كان ايعرف شيسوي، مرة وحده فكر انه يگدر يروح بيت الجمل., romanized: Ma kan ya'ref shesawi, marra waḥda fakkar ennah yigdar yirūḥ bait il-jamal	اُشنا فَمی چُنگ بُکُن، اِرانِ اَفِک کَت کِه اُ چی اَ خونَه ی دامونِ اُشتُری, oshna fami chong bokon, erani a fek kat ke oi chi akhonaye damone oshtori	Standard: او نمی دانست چه کند، ناگهان فکر کرد که می تواند به خانه شتر برود, romanized: u namidanast che konad, nagahan fekr kard keh metavanad beh khaney shetar beravad Tehrani: او نمی‌دونست چیکار کنه، یهو فکر کرد که می‌تونه بره خونه شتر., romanized: ou namidanast che kar koneh, yaho fekr kard keh metoneh bereh khoney shetar
I told you	Masculine: Arabic: أنا قلت لك, romanized: ana qulto laka Feminine: Arabic: ِأنا قلت لك, romanized: ana qulto laky	Masculine: Arabic: آنه گلت لك, romanized: aaneh gelt lek Feminine: Arabic: آنه گلت لچ, romanized: aaneh gelt lech	?	Standard: مَن بِه شُما گُفتَم, romanized: man be shoma goftam Bahraini: مُو سیت (سی تو) گفتُم, romanized: mo seet (si to) goftum Tehrani: مَن بِهِت (به تو) گُفتَم, romanized: man behet goftam
I told him	Masculine: Arabic: أنا قلت له, romanized: ana qulto lah Feminine: Arabic: ِأنا قلت لها, romanized: ana qulto laha	Masculine: Arabic: آنه گلت له, romanized: aaneh gelt lah Feminine: Arabic: آنه گلت لها, romanized: aaneh gelt laha	موم گت‌اوش, Moom gotosh	Bahraini: کفتمش/گفتم سیش, romanized: goftomish/goftom sish Tehrani: گفتم بهش, romanized: gotftam behesh
Today the weather is good.	Arabic: اليوم الطقس جميل, romanized: alyaoum altaqs jameel	Arabic: اليوم الهوا/الجو حلو/زين, romanized: elyoum elhawa helo/zain	اِروز هوا خَش/خَشِن, eroz hawa khash/khashen	Bahraini: اُمروز هوا خوبِن Tehrani: اِمروز هوا خوبِه Dari: اَمرُوز هوا خوب اَست
Tonight, they take my heart	Arabic: الليلة سيأخذون قلبي, romanized: allayla ya'ekthon qalbi	Arabic: الليلة بياخدون گلبي, romanized: el-lela beyakthon galbi	اِشو گُلُم شبَرِن‌, esho golom shabrin	Standard: امشب گُل من را می‌برن Bahraini: امشو گلمو/گل مونی/مونه میبرن Tehrani: امشب گُل منو (من رو) میبرن Dari: امشب گُل مه را می‌برن
I told them I am not feeling well; I'm not in a good state.	Arabic: أخبرتُهٌم أنني لستٌ على ما يرام؛ أنا لستٌ في حالةٍ جيدة., romanized: akhbartuhum 'anani last ealaa ma yuram; 'ana lastu fi halatin jayida	Arabic: گلت لهم اني مب زين؛ أنا مب في حاله زينه, romanized: gilt lihom eni mob zain, ana mub fe haleh zainah	?	Bahraini: مو گفتُم سیشون مو نه خوبُم، حالُم نه خوبِن Tehrani: من بهشان گفتَم مَن خوب نیستَم، حالَم خوب نیست Dari: من برای‌شان گفتم که حالم خوب نیست، وضعیت‌ام خوب نیست
Listen	Masculine: Arabic: اِسمَع, romanized: Esma'a Feminine: Arabic: ِاِسمَع, romanized: Esma'e	Masculine: Arabic: اِسمَع, romanized: Esma'a Feminine: Arabic: اِسمَعي/سِمعي, romanized: Esma'ee/Sem'ee	?	Bahraini: بِشنُف/گوش بگیر, romanized: Beshnof/Gosh begir Tehrani: بِشنو/گوش کن, romanized: Beshno/Gosh Kon
I love you so much	Masculine: Arabic: اُحِبُكَ كثيراً, romanized: Auhebuka Katheeran Feminine: Arabic: اُحِبُكِ كثيراً, romanized: Auhebuke Katheeran	Masculine: Arabic: اَحِبِكْ وايد, romanized: Aahebek Wayed Feminine: Arabic: اَحِبِچ وايد, romanized: Aahebech Wayed	بُرِی خاطِرُت مَی, Buri Khaterot May	Standard: خیلی دوستت دارم, romanized: khaily dostet daram Bahraini: خیلی خاطِرُت میخوم, romanized: Khaily Khateret Mikhom Tehrani: خیلی دوسِت دارَم, romanized: Khaily Doset Daram
I'm not bored/don't have time for this	Arabic: أنا لستُ أشعر بالملل., romanized: 'ana lst 'asheur bialmalla	Masculine: Arabic: ماني فاضي/آنه موب فاضي, romanized: mani fady/anah mwb fadi Feminine: Arabic: ماني فاضية/آنه موب فاضية, romanized: mani fadyah/anah mwb fadiah	?	Bahraini: پتک ندارُم, romanized: Patak Nadarum Tehrani: حوصله ندارَم, romanized: Havsaleh Nadaram
Burn	Masculine: Arabic: اِحتَرِق, romanized: ehtareq Feminine: Arabic: اِحتَرِقي, romanized: ehtareqi	Masculine: Arabic: اِحتَرِگ, romanized: ehtereg Feminine: Arabic: اِحتَرگي, romanized: ehtargi		Standard: بسوز, romanized: besoz Bahraini: تش بگیر, romanized: tash begir Tehrani: بسوز, romanized: besoz

=== Example Verbs ===
==== To-go ====
Form	English	Standard Arabic	Bahraini Arabic	Achomi	New Persian (Farsi)
Non-finite / participial	Going	ذاهب / ذاهبة	رايح/رايحه	چِدُم, Chedum	Standard: دارم می‌روم / رفتن, romanized: Daram Mirawam/Raftan (context-dependent)
Present (1sg)	I go	أذهب	أروح	اچُم, Achum	Standard: می‌روَم, romanized: Mirawam Bahraini: میرُم, romanized: Mirum Tehrani: میرَم, romanized: Miram
Past (1sg)	I went	Arabic: ذَهبتُ, romanized: dhahabtu	رحت	چِم (Chem)	Standard: رفته‌ام, romanized: rafta'am Bahraini: رفتُم, romanized: raftom Tehrani: رفتَم, romanized: raftam
Present (3sg)	he/she goes	يذهبُ (he goes); تذهبُ (she goes)	يروح (he goes); تروح (she goes)	أچِه romanized: Ache	Standard: می‌روَه, romanized: Miraweh Bahraini: میره, romanized: Mireh Tehrani: میره, romanized: Mireh
Past (3sg)	He/she went	ذهب / ذهبت	راح / راحت	چو, Chu	رفت, raft
?	?	?	?	اُچُام, Achum	Birawam

==== To-see (formal) ====
Form	English	Standard Arabic	Bahraini Arabic	Achomi	New Persian (Farsi)
Non-finite / participial	Seeing	رؤية	چُوف/شُوف/مطالعه	Deedan	Standard: تماشا کردن, romanized: tamasha Kardan Bahraini: سیل کردن, romanized: sail kardan Tehrani: نگاه کردن, romanized: negah kardan
Present (1sg)	I see	أرى	اچوف	Om dee	Standard: تماشا می‌کنم, romanized: tamasha mikonam Bahraini: سیل می‌کُنُم, romanized: sail mikonom Tehrani: نگاه می‌کُنَم, romanized: negah mikonam
Past (3sg)	(He/she) Saw	Masculine: رأى Feminine: رأت	چاف/چافت	Osh Dee	Standard: تماشا کرد, romanized: tamasha kard Bahraini: سیل کرد, romanized: sail kardeh Tehrani: نگاه کرد, romanized: negah kard/kardeh

=== Example Nouns ===
English	Modern Standard Arabic	Bahraini Arabic	Achomi	Standard New Persian (Farsi)	Bahraini/Bushehri New Persian (Farsi)	Iranian (Tehrani) New Persian (Farsi)
Money	Arabic: مال, romanized: mal	Arabic: فلوس/بيزات, romanized: feloos/bizat	Persian: پول, romanized: Púl	Persian: پول, romanized: Púl	Persian: پِیسه, romanized: peyse	Persian: پول, romanized: Púl
Food	Arabic: طعام, romanized: taam	Arabic: اكل, romanized: akel	Persian: خوراک, romanized: khorak	Persian: غذا, romanized: ghaza (from Arabic)	Persian: خوراک, romanized: khorak	Persian: غذا, romanized: ghaza (from Arabic)
Breakfast	Arabic: إفطار, romanized: iftar	Arabic: فطور/ریوگ, romanized: fotoor/reyoog	Persian: ناشتا, romanized: Nashta	Persian: صبحانه, romanized: Sobhaneh	Persian: ناشتا, romanized: Nashta	Persian: صبحانه, romanized: Sobhaneh
Lunch	Arabic: غداء, romanized: ghada'a	Arabic: غده, romanized: ghadeh	Persian: چاشت, romanized: Chasht	Persian: ناهار, romanized: Nahar (from Arabic)	Persian: چاش, romanized: Chash	Persian: ناهار, romanized: Nahar (from Arabic)
Socks	Arabic: جوراب, romanized: jurab	Arabic: دولاغ, romanized: Dolagh (from Achomi)	Persian: دولاغ, romanized: Dolagh ?	Persian: جوراب, romanized: Jurab (from Arabic)	Persian: دولاغ, romanized: Dolagh	Persian: جوراب, romanized: Jurab
Aunt	Arabic: عمة/خالة, romanized: ameh/khaleh	Arabic: عمة/خالة, romanized: ameh/khaleh	Persian: ببه/دامون, romanized: babeh/damon	Persian: عمه/خاله, romanized: ameh/khaleh	Persian: عمه/خاله/دامونه, romanized: ameh/khaleh/damoneh	Persian: عمه/خاله, romanized: ameh/khaleh
Nose	Arabic: انف, romanized: anf	Arabic: خشم, romanized: khashem	Persian: پوز, romanized: puz	Persian: دماغ, romanized: demagh	Persian: پوز, romanized: puz	Persian: دماغ, romanized: demagh
Mouth	Arabic: فم, romanized: fam	Arabic: بوز, romanized: booz	Persian: کَپ, romanized: kap	Persian: دهن, romanized: dahan	Persian: کَپ, romanized: kap	Persian: دهن, romanized: dahan
Brain	Arabic: مخ/دماغ, romanized: mokh/demagh	Arabic: مخ/دماغ, romanized: mokh/demagh	Persian: مغز/عقل, romanized: maghz/aql	Persian: مغز, romanized: maghz	Persian: مغز/عقل, romanized: maghz/aql	Persian: مغز, romanized: maghz
Water	Arabic: ماء, romanized: ma'a	Arabic: ماي, romanized: mai	Persian: او, romanized: ow	Persian: آب, romanized: ab	Persian: او, romanized: ow	Persian: آب, romanized: ab
Stomach	Arabic: معدة, romanized: ma'adah	Arabic: معدة, romanized: ma'adah	Persian: كُم/شِكَم, romanized: kum/shekam	Persian: شِكَم, romanized: shekam	Persian: كُم, romanized: kum	Persian: شِكَم, romanized: shekam
Just/Only	Arabic: فقط, romanized: faqat	Arabic: بس, romanized: bas	?	Persian: فقط, romanized: faqat	Persian: بس, romanized: bas	Persian: فقط, romanized: faqat
Hair	Arabic: شعر, romanized: shaer	Arabic: شعر, romanized: shaer	?	Persian: مو, romanized: mo	Persian: موی, romanized: moi	Persian: مو, romanized: mo
Pant(s)	Arabic: بنطال, romanized: bintal	Arabic: صِروال, romanized: serwal	Persian: نمتاه, romanized: Nemtah	Persian: شلوار, romanized: shalwar	Persian: شلوار, romanized: shalwar	Persian: شلوار, romanized: shalvar

== Cultural Heritage ==
=== Music ===
Sultaneez was a local Bahraini band that operated between 1989 and 2003. They are known for laying the foundation for "Bandari music" and have produced songs in Achomi (Bastaki dialect), Farsi, and Arabic. Their Bastaki song "Naz Akon Naz Akon," inspired by Yusuf Hadi Bastaki's folkloric song of the same name, is one of the most popular songs of this group. Kouros Shahmiri's song "Naz Nakon", which was released later (1998 CE), (Note: States the release date is 1998-06-29, remastered on: 2001-06-22) was inspired by Sultaneez's song "Naz Akon", which was released on 25 June 1990. (Note: Released on: 1990-06-25) Additionally, the song "Chai Chayi" by Koros was also inspired by the song of Soltaniz "Chayi Chayeem Kalam Dard Akon", which was released in 1989. Their legacy still lives on to this day, and many Bahraini Iranians listen to them to remember their roots.

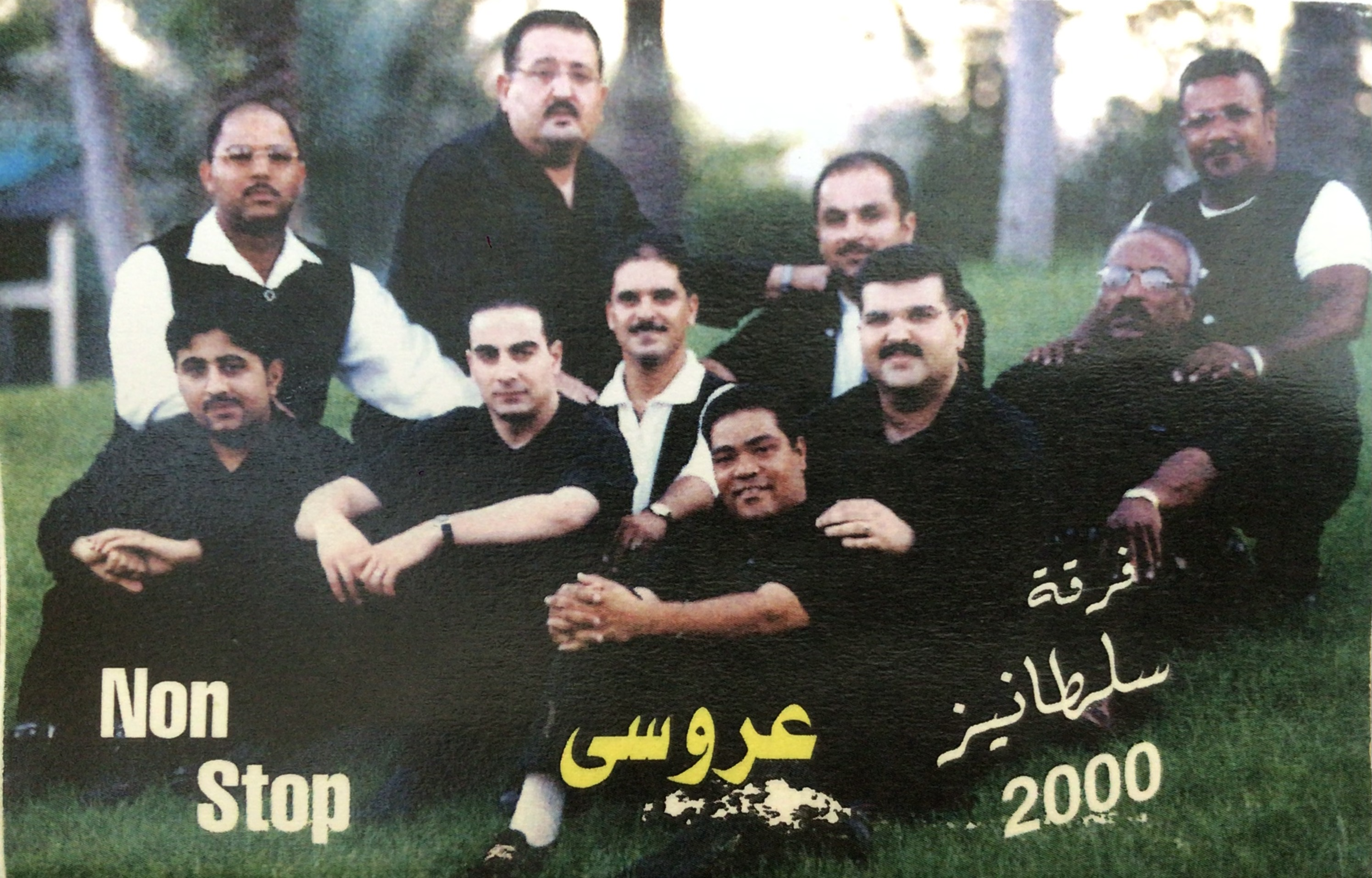
Sultaneez as they appear in their last Album "Aroosi" released in 2000

Other Bahraini Persian bands include:

- Al-Kawakib (فرقة الکواکب البحرینیة)
- Sharks (فرقة شارکس البحرینیة)
- Al-Ghuraba'a (فرقة الغرباء البحرینیة)
- Al-Danah (فرقة الدانة البحرینیة) – This group was composed of "Janahi" family members.
- Al-Salam (فرقة السلام البحرینیة)
- Al-Anwar Band (فرقه انوار بحرینی).

=== Food ===
==== Achomi ====
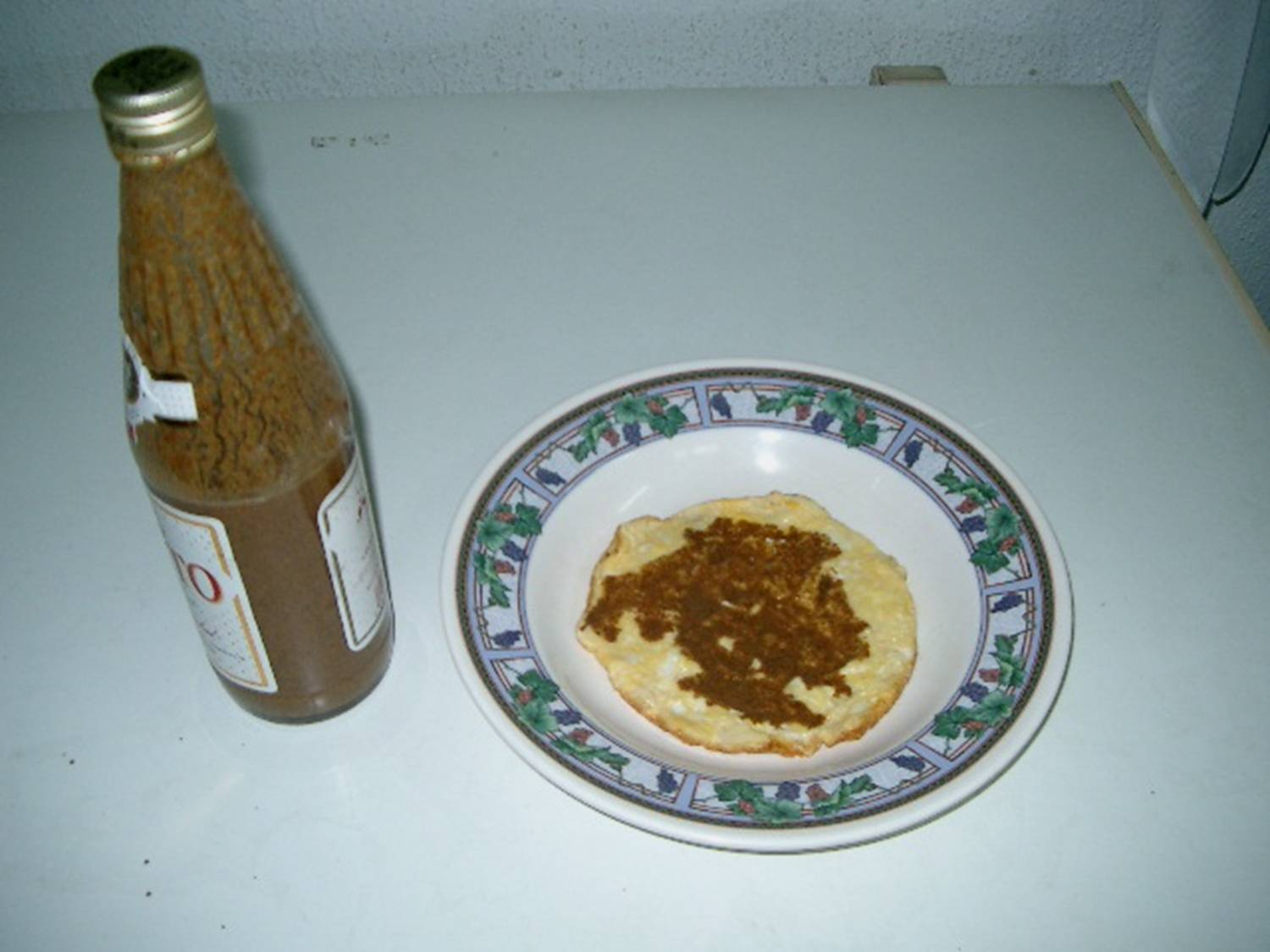
Mahyaweh

- One of the notable local delicacies of the Achomi Persians in Bahrain is Mahyawa, consumed in Southern Iran (specifically in Irahistan) as well, is a watery earth brick coloured sauce made from sardines and consumed with bread or other food.

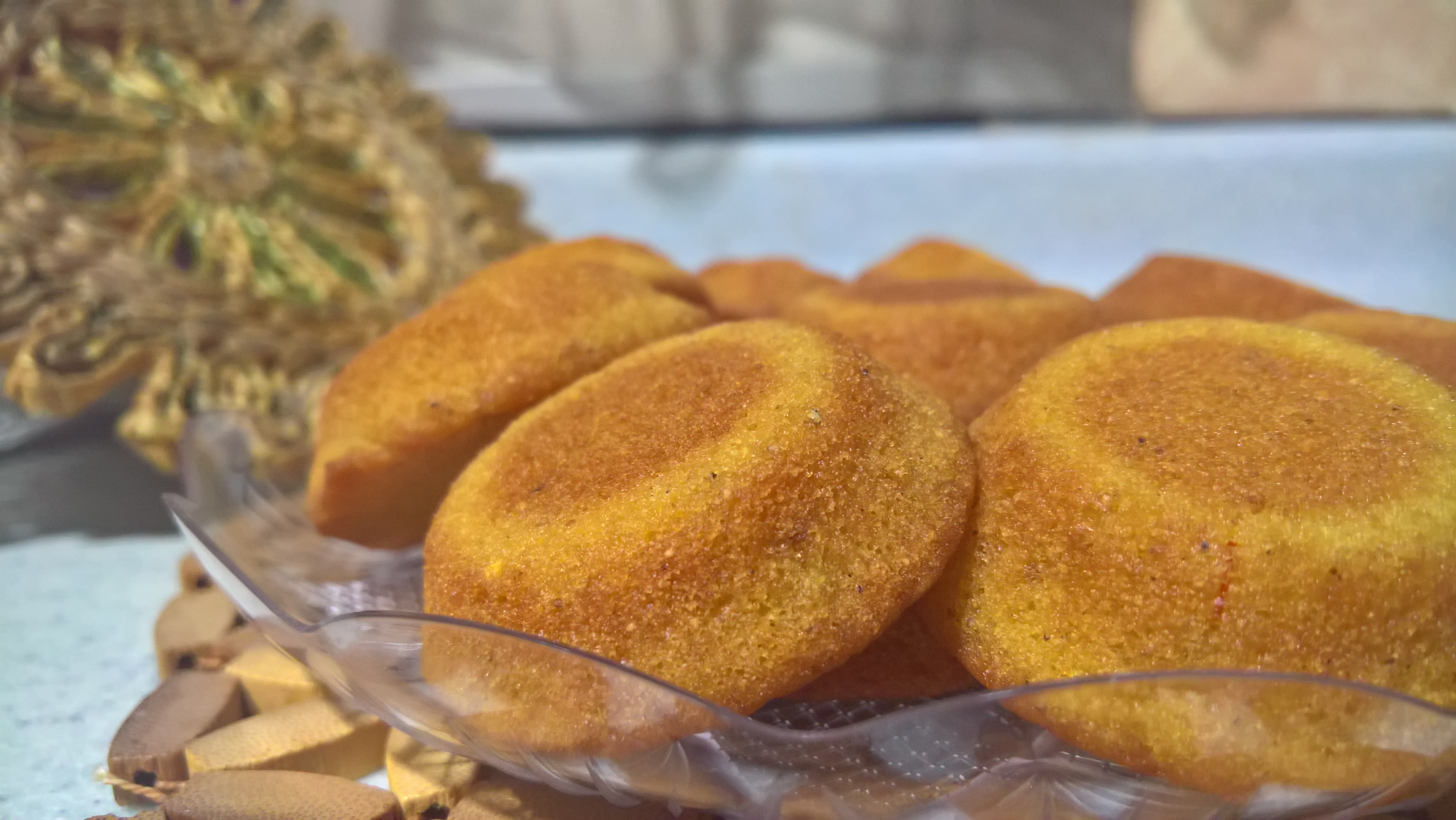
Khanfaroosh

- Another one is Khanfaroosh, Khan (خان) meaning "House" and Foroosh (فروش) meaning "Selling," which translates to "Selling of the house." It has "Achomi" roots in southern Iran (particularly Hormozgan province).
- Another local "Achomi" delicacy is "pishoo" (Persian: پیشو) made from rose water (golab) and agar.
- Cham-Chamoo is a sweet naan that is made similar to Qeshm Island version.

==== Other ====
Other food items consumed are similar to other Iranian cuisine. For example, Kaleh Pacheh (Arabic: باجه, romanized: bajeh, Persian: پاچه, romanized: Pacheh) is very popular in Bahrain, in addition to Iranian Grills, Chello Kabab, and other National Iranian dishes.

=== Dance ===
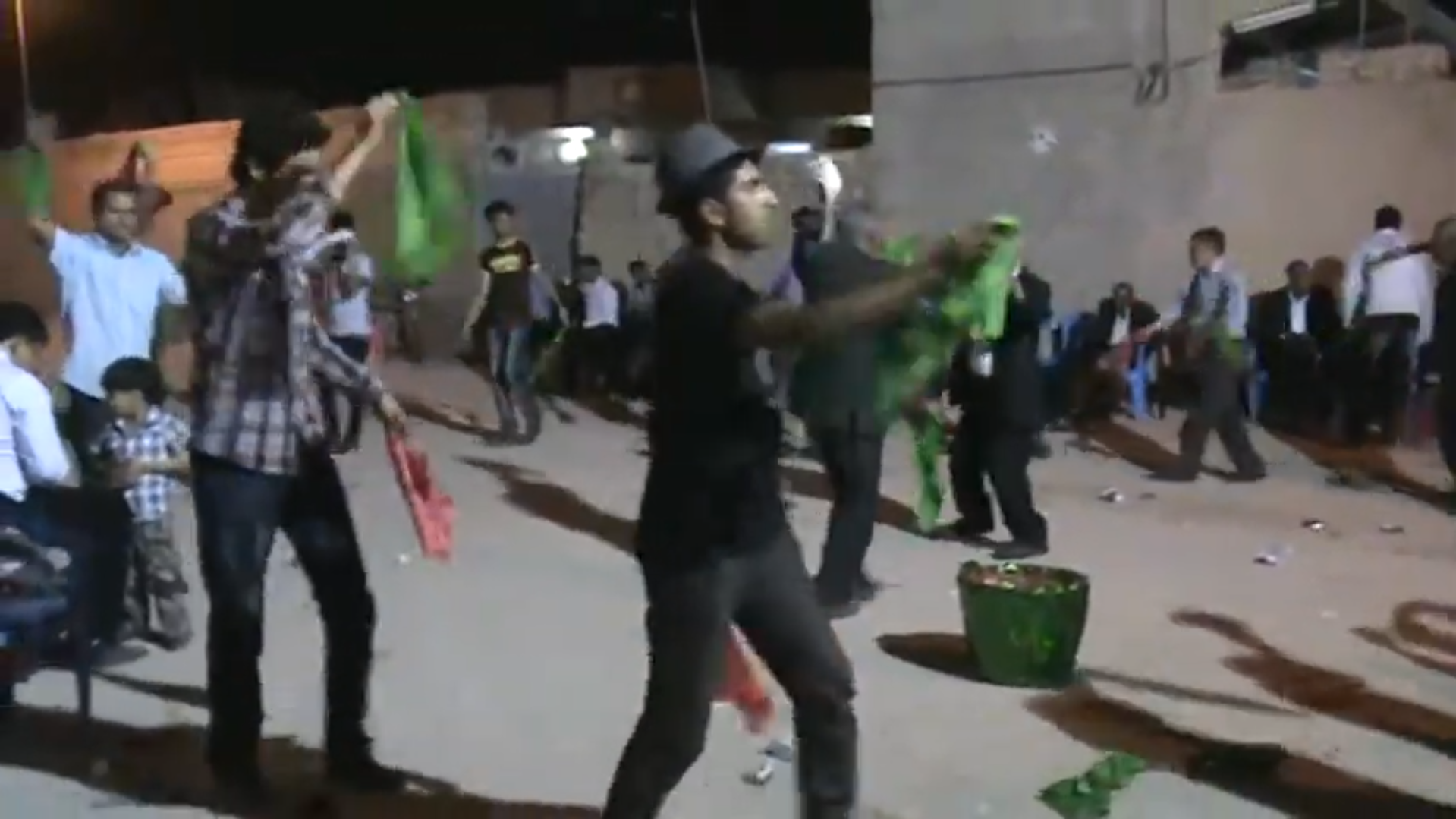
Achomi men dancing in Bidshahr

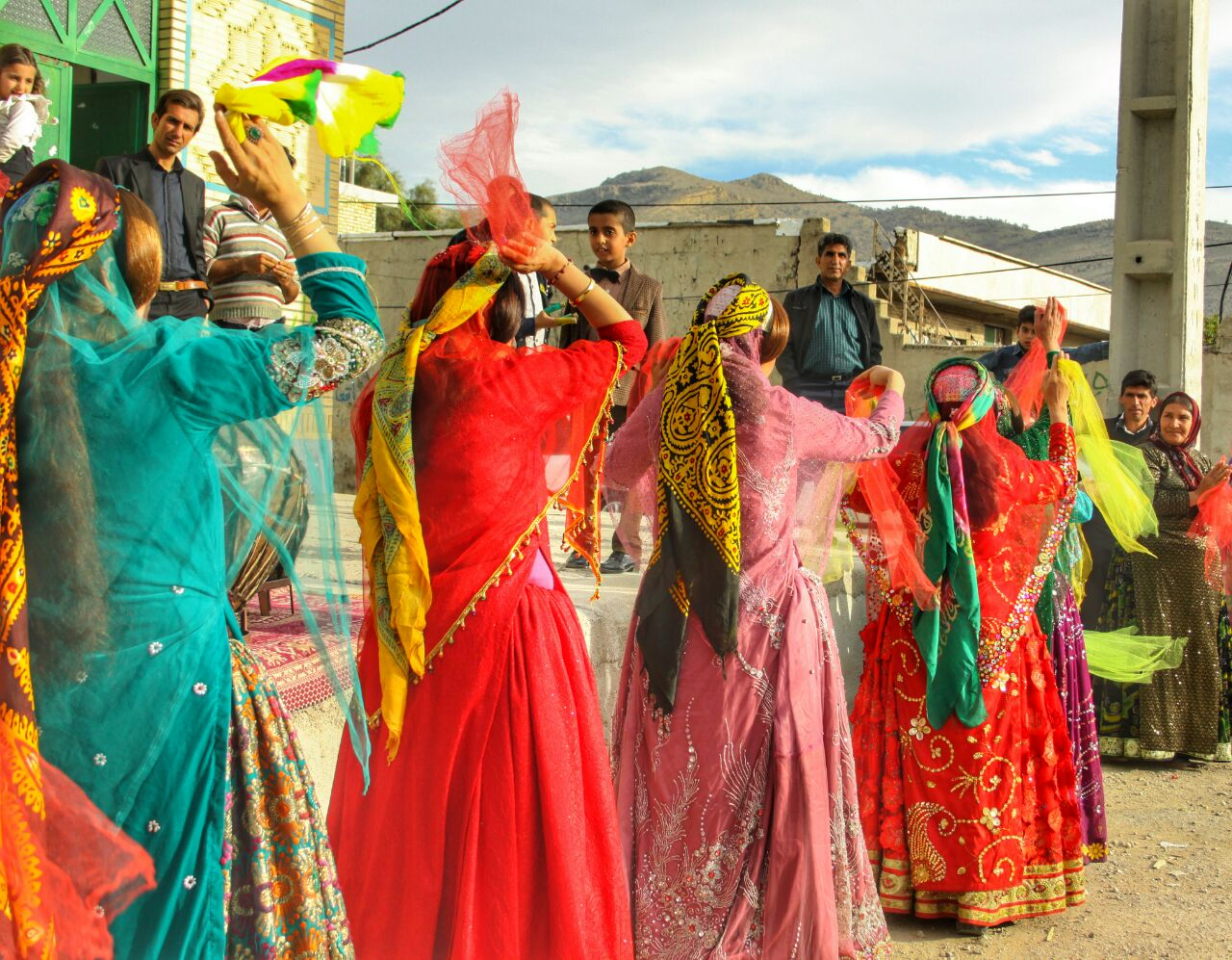
Mamasani Lur dance

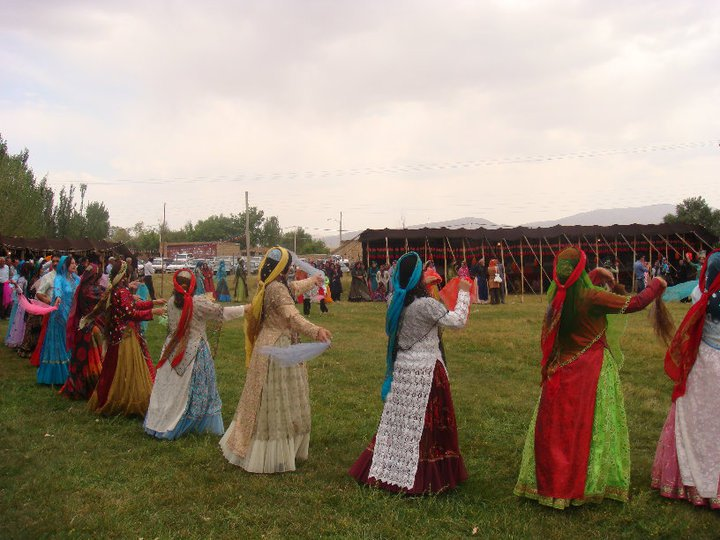
Basseri dance

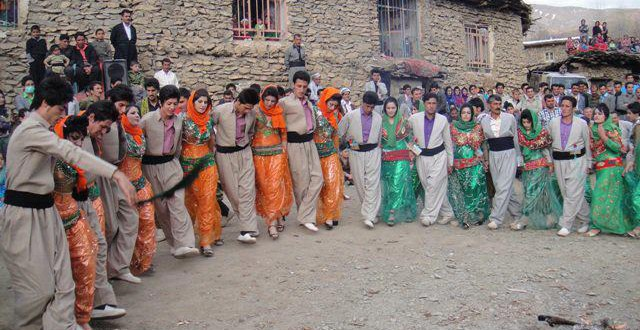
Kurdish dance

The Iranian dances are common among many Iranian people (including Khodmoonis, Lurs, Kurds, etc.)... with variations in the style, the most common being the "Dastmal Bazi" variations, with the Kurdish dance and Baluchi dance being the most different.

=== Restaurants ===
Famous Iranian restaurants in Bahrain include "Isfahani" (named after Isfahan) and "Takht Jamshid" (named after a famous historical site in Persopolis).

=== Families and clans ===
- Khonji/Al-Khonji (Arabic: خُنجي) (Khodmooni)
- Bastaki/Al-Bastaki (Arabic: البستكي) (Khodmooni)
- Karmostaji (Arabic: كرمستاجي) (Khodmooni)
- Awadhi/Al-Awadhi (Arabic: العوضي) (Khodmooni)
- Janahi/Al-Janahi (Arabic: جناحي) (Khodmooni)
- Al-Ansari (Arabic: الانصاري) (Khodmooni)
- Galadari/Al-Galadari(Arabic: كلداري, Persian: گله‌داری) (Khodmooni; Bikhis)
- Kookherdi/Al-Kokherdi (Arabic: كوخردي) (Khodmooni)
- Kaziruni/Al-Kaziruni (Arabic: كازروني) (Basseri?) (Note: Referenced under more than one subgroup)
- Ali Reza (Arabic: علي رضا)
- Almoayed (Arabic: المؤيد)
- Daylami (Arabic: ديلمي) (Lur)
- Eshaq (Arabic: اسحاق)
- Fakhro (Arabic: فخرو)
- Kanoo (Arabic: كانو)
- Kuhiji/Koheeji (Arabic: كوهجي, Persian: كوهيجي)) (Khodmooni)
- Matar (Arabic: مطر)
- Safar (Arabic: صفر) (Bakhtiari Lurs)
- Al-Fardan (Arabic: الفردان)
- Bushehri/Bushihri (Arabic: بوشهري)
- Diwani (Arabic: ديواني)
- Farsi (Arabic: فارسي)
- Sayigh (Arabic: صايغ)
- Ahwazi (Arabic: اهوازي) (Khouzestani Arabs?)
- Al-Zarb
- Aryan/Ariyan (Arabic: اريان)
- BederAkbari (Arabic: أكبري)
- Beder (Arabic: بدر)
- Beljik (Arabic: بلجيك)
- Dawani'(Arabic: داواني)
- Husayn Banna' (Arabic: حسين البنا)
- Isfandiyar (Arabic: اسفنديار)
- Sa'atiRuyan (Arabic: رويان)
- SharifSa'ati (Arabic: ساعاتي)
- Sharif (Arabic: شريف)
- Shekib (Arabic: شكيب) (Basseri?)
- Dashti (Arabic: دشتي) (from Dashti County or Dashtestan Basseri?)
- Dashti (Arabic: دشتي) (from Dashti County or Dashtestan?)
- Rahimi (Arabic: رحيمي)
- Jamsheer (Arabic: جمشير)
- Thaqafi
- Bucheery (Arabic: بوجيري, Persian: بوچیری)
- Aseery (Arabic: اسيري)
- Ma'rafi
- Jahromi (Arabic: جهرمي) (?)
- Al-Balushi (Arabic: البلوشي) (Baloch)
- Malallah (Note: Some Khodmooni some Arabs?)
- Al-Kurdi (Arabic: الكردي) (Kurd)
- Karimi (Arabic: كريمي)

Many of the previously mentioned families are of Persian origin based on historical records and the locations of their ancestral homelands. However, many choose to identify as Arabs to avoid discrimination or controversy. Ultimately, this often depends on the strength of their Persian cultural ties and the surrounding environment, which can lead to differing views within the same family about whether their heritage is Persian or Arab.

It is also common for these families to add "Al" (Arabic: ال), meaning "The," to their surnames to make them sound more Arabic. Some view this as abandoning or distancing themselves from their Persian roots, while others see it as a way to avoid racial issues. This shift is evident today, as many have adopted Arabic attire and now only speak fluent Arabic.

== Contributions ==
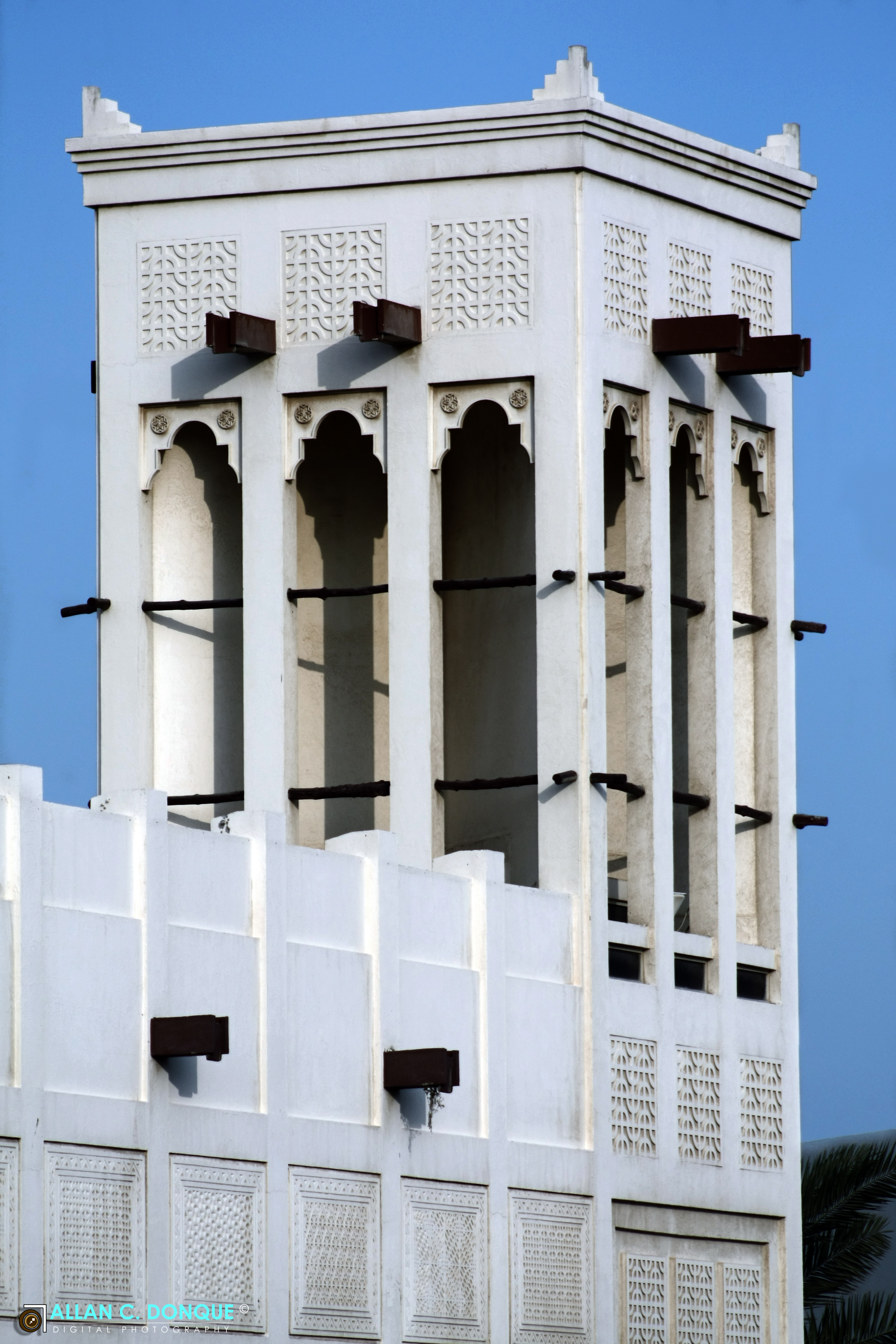
A wind tower in Bahrain

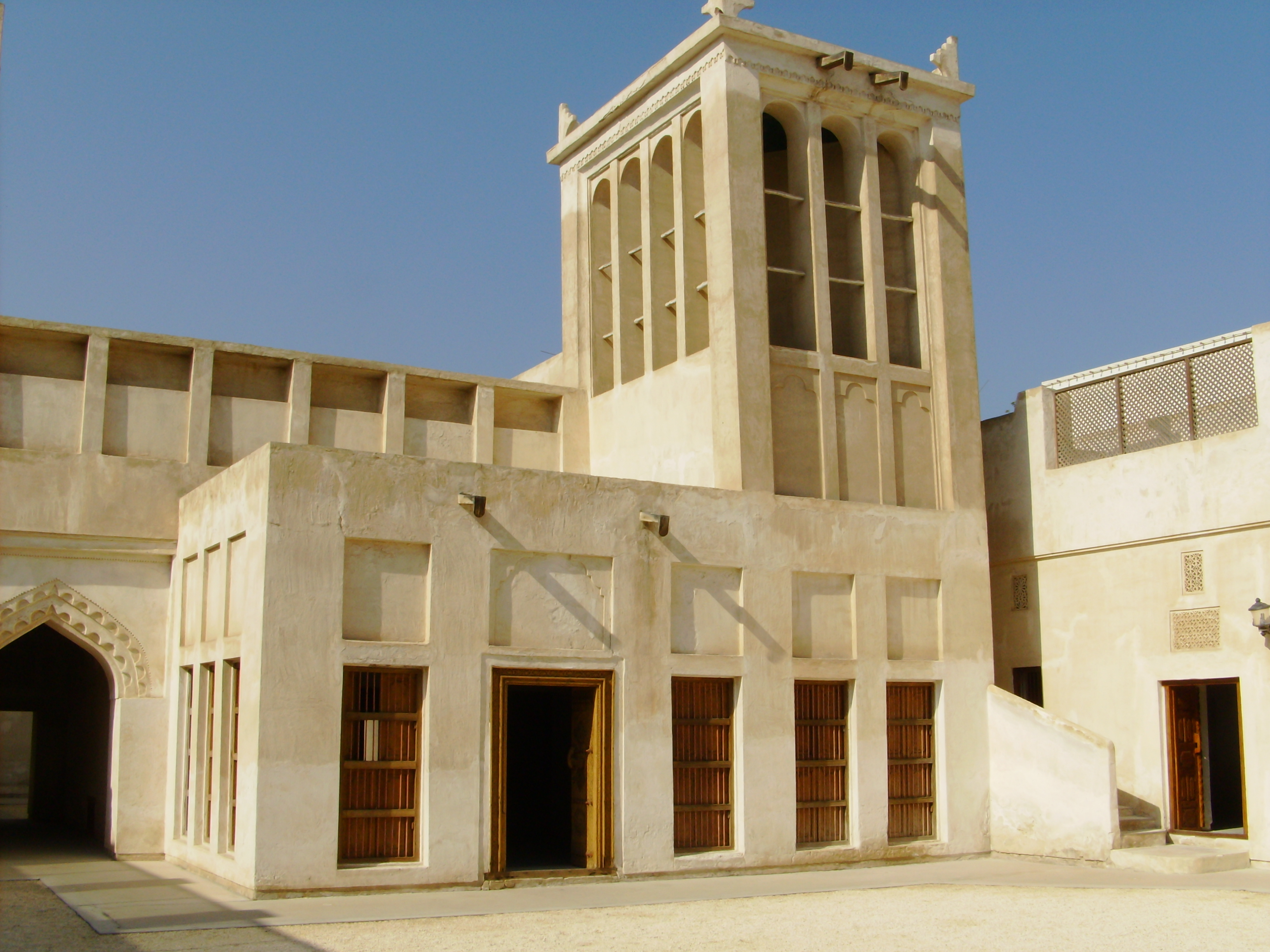
Isa Bin Ali House, Muharraq, Bahrain

=== Architecture ===
- The Khodmoonis introduced the wind towers (Badgir) to Bahrain and the UAE.
- The Achums of Bastak, led by Sheikh Abdul Noor Al-Bastaki, are credited with opening the first hotel in Bahrain. The Bahrain Hotel, still referred to by locals as 'Abdul Noor's Hotel,' officially opened in 1950, although construction began as early as the 1920s. It is set to undergo a revamp and makeover.

=== Linguistic influences ===
The Iranian languages have had the biggest foreign linguistic influence on Bahrani and Bahraini Arabic. The indigenous Bahrani dialect of Bahrain has also borrowed many words from Persian, for example:

- Chandal - woods used in constructing the roof of old buildings.
- Bādgir - towers with single or two, three or four sided openings above dwellings to let wind air into the building to create a current and hence cool the air inside the lower floor rooms. Now they refer to them as "Mulgaf" (ملقف) instead.
- Hast – Existing, for example Bahrainis sometimes say "Sh-hast?" (Meaning: What's up?).
- Bannad – He closed.
- Khosh – Good.
- Buuz – Mouth (noted to be from an older Iranian dialect).

=== Imported goods ===
- The migration of the Bushehri community to Bahrain led to a significant rise in the importation of certain goods, including books, rosewater, tea, and spirits, which distinguished them from the local Arab population.
- Persians in Bahrain are known and are famous in Bahrain for bread-making.

=== Husayniyya ===
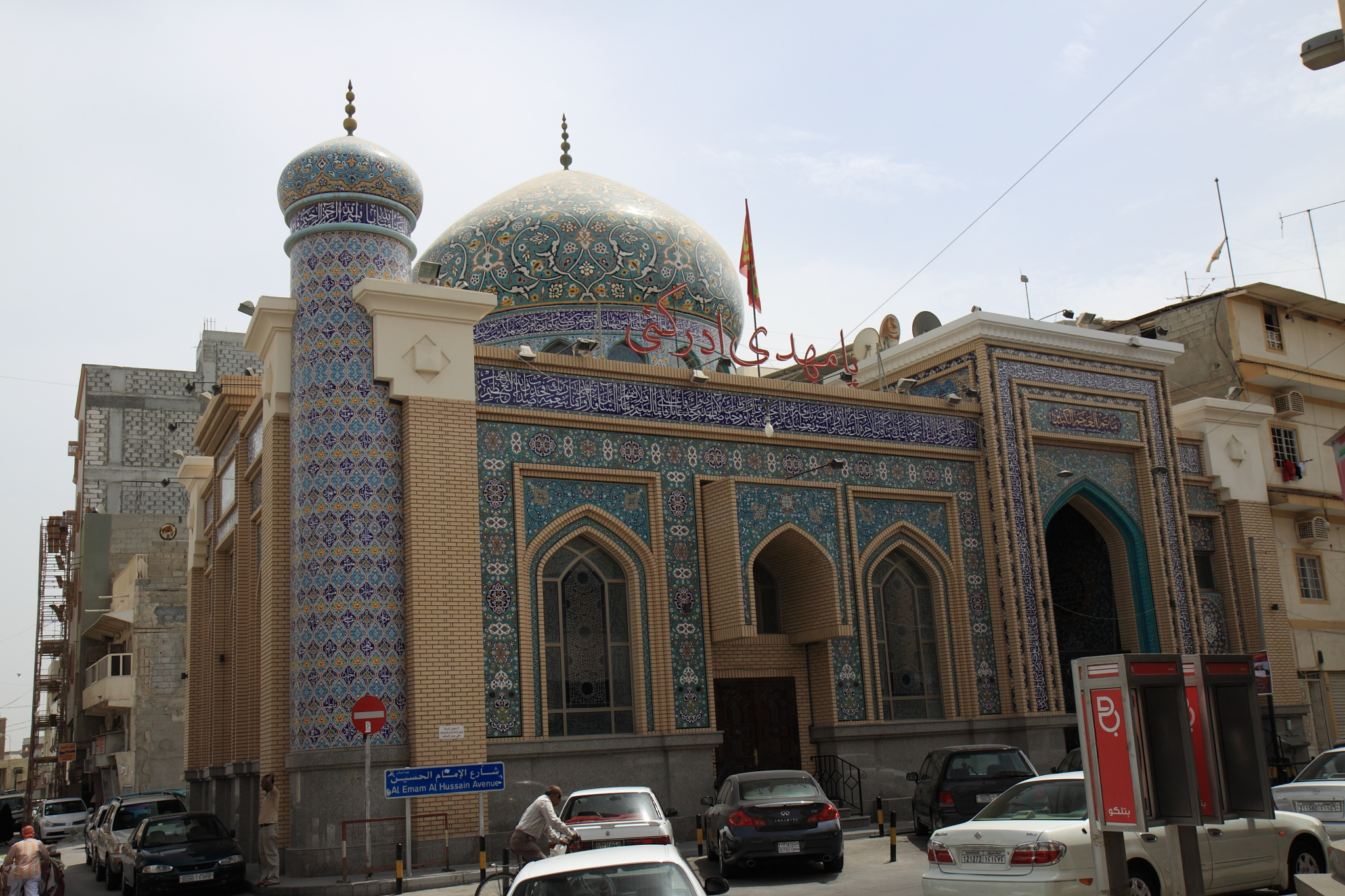
Matam Al-Ajam Al-Kabeer in Manama

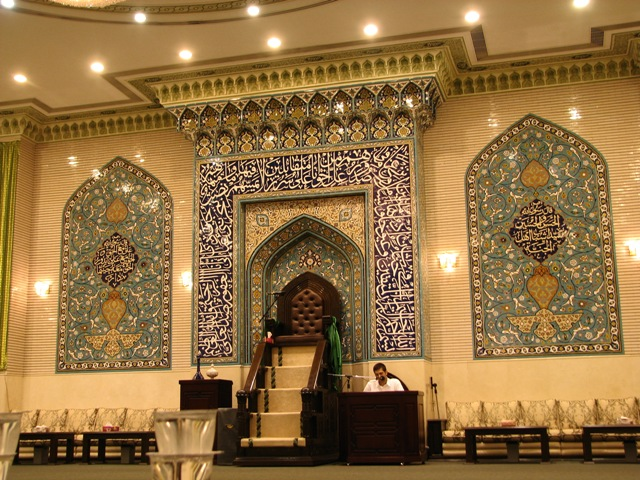
Matam Al Ajam interior, Fareej el-Makharqa

Matam Al-Ajam Al-Kabeer (Arabic:مأتم العجم الكبير) is the first Persian Matam and the largest such matam in Bahrain. It was founded in Fareej el-Makharqa by Abdul-Nabi Al-Kazerooni, a rich Persian merchant who was a representative of the Persian community in the council of the hakim Isa ibn Ali Al Khalifa. An immigrant from the Dashti region of Iran, he organised processions, collected donations, and hired orators (Arabic: خطيب) to speak at the matam. Construction started in 1882 as a specialized building where Ashura, a holy day in Shia Islam, would be marked with processions, ceremonial flagellation and passion plays commemorating the death of Imam Hussain. The matam is still used for this purpose.

It was originally built with simple construction material such as palm tree trunks and leaf stalks. The matam was formally established in 1904 where it was decided that the matam would be renovated with rocks, clay and cement. Initially in the 1890s, the matam was primarily supported by Persian merchants, with two-thirds of the donation coming from the Bushehri and Safar family, respectively. For much of the 20th century, the matam had relied on yearly donations of money and land from rich and poor members of the Persian community and from waqf revenue. The matam also had an emergency relief fund that was to be distributed to the poor and to needy individuals; the matam provided financial aid and shelter to people following the collapse of the pearling market in the 1930s.

Upon the death of Abdul-Nabi Al-Kazerooni in 1927, Abdul Nabi Bushehri, himself a Persian immigrant from Bushehr and a well-respected figure in the Persian community, took control of the matam. Unlike his close friend, Bushehri ran the matam with other notables of the Persian community, forming a de facto board. Upon Bushehri's death in 1945, the board took over. To prevent confusion, the board appointed a specific member, Hasan Baljik, to act as the key carrier to the matam and be responsible for programs and budgetary issues. In 1971, an administrative board consisting of a president, vice president, secretary, treasurer, and others was set up, all of whom were rich merchants.

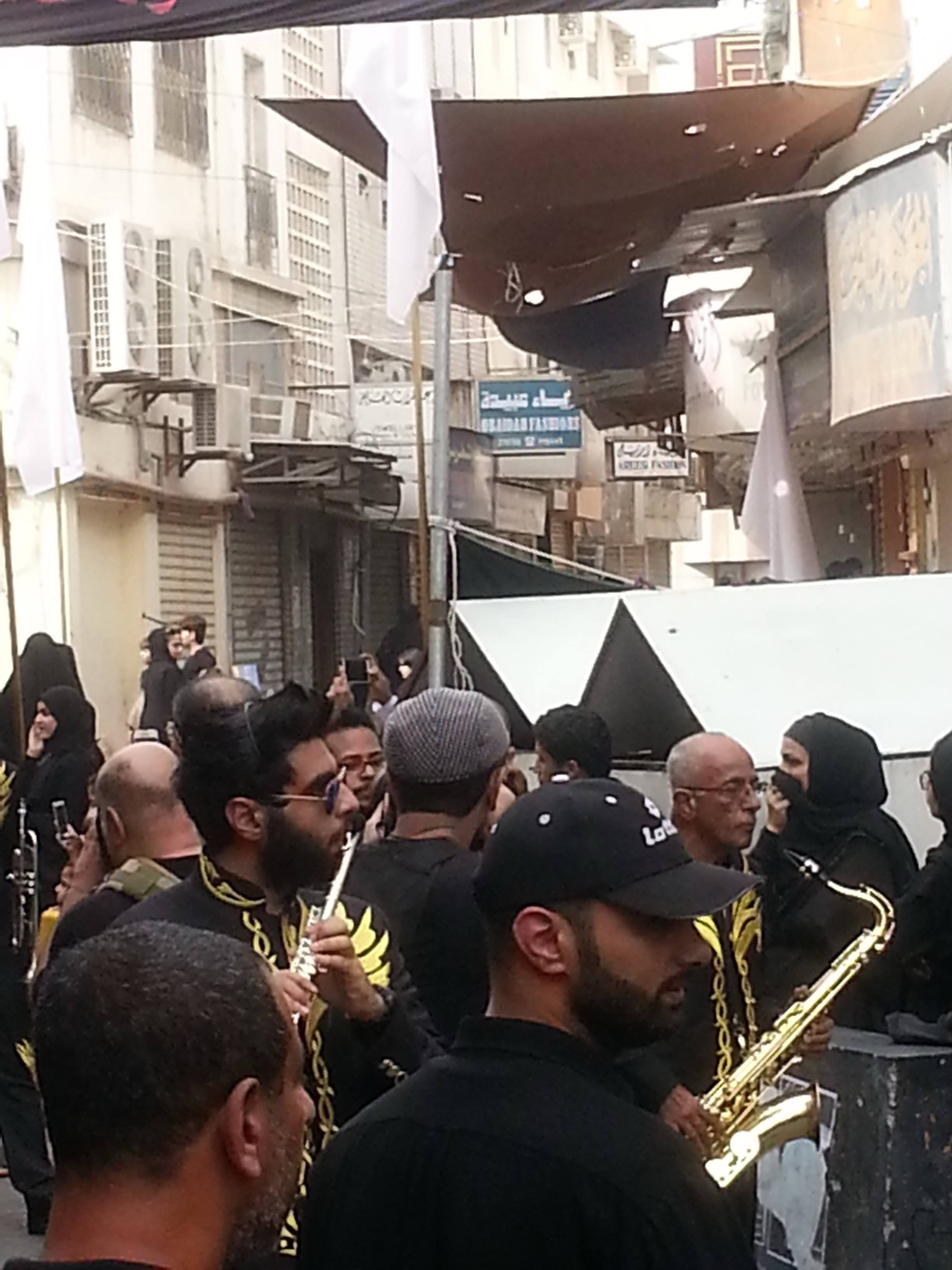
Shia Ajams in Manama during Muharram parades (November 2014).

== Names of Locations ==
In addition to this, many names of villages and districts in Bahrain are derived from Persian, Bahrain's historical ties to Persian culture, particularly under the Achaemenid, Parthian, and Sassanian Empire, as well as influencesf during the Safavid rule (1501–1722), have left a significant impact on place names and cultural elements in the region. City and village names such as Manama, Karbabad, Salmabad, Karzakan, Samaheej, Tashan, Duraz, Barbar, Demistan, Karrana, Shakhura, Shahrekan, and Jurdab were originally derived from Persian, suggesting Persian influence on the island's history.

Current name	Former name	Persian root	Translation
Al-Manama (المنامه)	Manamah	Man-Nameh (Farsi: من نامه)	The name "Manāmah" was first recorded around the year 730 AH (approximately 1330 CE) during the visit of Turān Shah of Hurmuz to the island. At that time, it had already been annexed by his predecessor, Tahamtam II of Hurmuz. Derived from two words, meaning I and Speech. Originally, it was called simply "Manamah" before being renamed to Al-Manamah. In Persian, "man" (من) means "me," and "nameh" (نامه) means "letter," similar to the structure of words like "Shah Nameh" (Book of Kings). Some claim that Al-Manama is actually derived from Arabic Al-Muna'amah (المنعمة) and its people were referred to as Almuna'ami; in the Shia book by Sayyed Mohsen Alameen "A'yan Alshia" (أعيان الشيعة), a Shi'a scholar from Manama or Muna'ama was mentioned Shaykh Ali bin Umran bin Fayad Almuna'ami Albahrani (شيخ علي بن عمران بن فياض المنعمي البحراني)
Al-Adliya	Zulmabad	Zulm Abad (Farsi: ظلم‌آباد)	Like the name of a village in Gotvand County, Khuzestan, Iran – contrary to the original name, this place is not oppression, and it has become the city of lovers.
Al-Diraz (دراز)	Diraz	Diraz (Farsi: دراز)	Long. A village stretched along the coastline.
Busaiteen	Beseytin	Beseytin (Farsi: بسیطین)	Similar to a name of a village in Khouzestan, Iran.
Al-Malkiya	Malchiyeh	Mal Chiyeh (Farsi: مال چیه)	What is it (for)? – The locals still refer to it as "Malchiyeh." Furthermore, it is named similarly to village in Khouzestan.
Shahrakan (شهركان)	N/A	Shahr-akan	Old Town
Karzakan	N/A	Karz-akan	
Shakhura (شاخورة)	Shahkhura	Shah-khora (Farsi: شاه خورا)	آخور شاه (اصطبل پادشاه) Stable of Kings
Jurdab (جرداب)	Gerdāb	Gerd-āb (Farsi: گردآب)	Whirlpool
Salmabad (سلماباد)	Selm-ābād	Selm-ābād (Farsi: سلم‌آباد)	Would translate as "the peaceful settlement" or "the place of peace," with "سلم" (Salm) meaning "peace" and "آباد" implying a settled or prosperous area.
Karbabad (كرباباد)	Karb-ābād	Karb-ābād (Farsi: کرب‌آباد)	Would translate as "the settlement of sadness" or "the place of sorrow," as "کرب" (Karb) refers to "sadness" or "distress" and "آباد" again indicates a settled or inhabited place.
Dumistan (دمستان)	Dabistan	Dabistan (Farsi: دب اِستان)	The term "Dabistan" (دبستان) is a Persian word that typically means "school" or "place of learning.": Dab (دب) refers to "learning" or "education."; -stan (اِستان) is a suffix meaning "place" or "land of."; So, Dabistan can be understood as "the place of learning" or simply "a school." While the last known location of Al-Ittihad school (Persian: دبستان اتحاد ملی, romanized: Dabistan Ittihad Melli, lit. 'National Union Primary School') is known to have been in Manama, it is possible that the school at some point may have been located here.
Al-Daih (ديه)	Daih (Arabic: ديه)	Deh (Farsi: دِه)	Village
Karrana (كرانه)	Kerrāneh	Kerrā-neh (Farsi: کرانه)	The Coast.
Barbar (باربار)	Bar-bar	Bar+Bar (Farsi: بار بار)	Bar Bar – Dobār (two times) – The word 'bar' may have been repeated to confirm the arrival of shipments or foreign cargo to the shore.
Samaheej (سماهيج)	Samahīj Meshmahij	Se-māhi (Farsi: سِه ماهی)	Three fish. On the origins of the name Samahīj, al-Bakri, quoting others, says: "Samāhīj is from Persian se (three) and māhi (fish) and hence, 'the three fish'." The sound change in the final "i < y" of the Persian form māhi is rather pronounced locally "-j" which is a phonetic feature known as "aj ajah" and ascribed to Qudā-ah tribes as in the word Tamīmi (a person belonging to bani Tamīm tribes) realized Tamīmij. whilst Mishmahig, in Middle-Persian/Pahlavi means "ewe-fish".
Sangaki (سنگکی)	–	Sangaki (Farsi: سنگكي)	Written in MSA as "سنككي" (sankaki) and pronounced locally as "سنگکی" (sangaki), is a neighbourhood, likely named after immigrants who migrated to the area from Sangaki, a village in Hormozgan, Iran, or the Sangaki bread.

== Notable people ==
- Sheikh Abdul Noor Al-Bastaki (Arabic: الشيخ عبدالنور البستكي) – Often credited for opening the first hotel in Bahrain, the Bahrain Hotel.
- Abdulhussain bin Ali Mirza (Arabic: عبد الحسين بن علي ميرزا) – current Minister of Electricity and Water Affairs of Bahrain.
- Fatema Hameed Gerashi (Arabic: فاطمة حميد كراشي) – Bahraini swimmer.
- Karim Fakhrawi – co-founder of Al-Wasat, an award-winning newspaper in Bahrain.
- Ghada Jamshir (Arabic: غادة جمشير) – Bahraini women's rights activist.
- Zainab Al Askari (Arabic: زينب العسكري) – Bahraini author and actress, with roots in Meymand.
- Ahmed Sultan (Arabic: أحمد سلطان) – Executive Director of International Offices & Business Development (Manufacturing, Transport & Logistics) at Bahrain Economic Development Board (EDB) and former Sultaneez band lead singer
- Khaled Janahi (Arabic: خالد جناحي) – Chairman of Vision 3, Member of Bahrain EDB, and former partner at Pricewaterhouse Coopers, of Sunni background.
- Linda Janahi (Arabic: لِندا جناحي) – Chief of Corporate Services at Bahrain EDB, of Achomi background.
- Mohammed Al-Alawi (Arabic: محمد العلوي) – Chief of Marketing & Communications at Bahrain EDB.
- Redha Al-Ansari (Arabic: رضا الأنصاري) – Executive Director of Research at Bahrain EDB, of Achomi background.
- Sonya Janahi (Arabic: سونيا جناحي) – ILO West Asia Business Group representative, Bahrain Chamber of Commerce and Industry (BCCI) board member, IOE employers VP Asia, University of Bahrain board member, Franchise Expert, and Keynote Speaker, of Achomi and Sunni background.
- Khalid Fouad (Arabic: خالد فؤاد) – Bahraini singer of maternal Achomi ancestry.
- Eman Aseery (Arabic: ايمان اسيري) – Bahraini poet.
- Hossein Asiri (Arabic: حسين اسيري) – Bahraini Achomi singer who sings in Bahraini Arabic, Farsi and Achomi.
- Neyla Janahi (Arabic: محمد القصاب) – Bahraini TV presenter, of Achomi and Sunni background.
- Fathiya Al-Bastaki (Arabic: فتحية البستكي): Animal rights activist and advocate.
- Hussain Javad Parveez (Arabic: محمد حسين جواد برويز) – Bahraini activist.
- Ahmed Al-Bastaki (Arabic: أحمد البستكي) – Bahraini artist.
- Dr. Ali Akbar Bushehri (Arabic: د. علي اكبر بوشهري) – historical researcher.
- Musa Al-Ansari (Arabic: موسى الأنصاري) – Secretary General of the Al-Ikha'a Association, of Achomi background
- Youssef Amr Allah (Arabic: يوسف امرالله) – Administrative Member of the Al-Ikha'a Association.
- Jaafar Abdeen (Arabic: جعفر عابدين) – Member of the Al-Ikha'a Association.
- Nasser Hussein (Arabic: ناصر حسين) – Member of the Al-Ikha'a Association.
- Samira Rajab (Arabic: سميرة رجب) – Ba'athist political activist, played a pro-government role in the 2011 protests, identifies as Bahrani Arab, mother is of Iranian descent.
- Fatima Kaziruni (Arabic: فاطمة كازروني) – Bahraini host and actress.
- Shaima'a Rahimi (Arabic: شيماء رحيمي) – Bahraini media figure and actress.
- Mohammed Hassan Janahi – member of Bahraini parliament.
- Mohamed Yousif Al-Maarafi – member of Bahraini parliament.
- Prof. Hamid Khanji – member of the Central Committee of the Progressive Forum.
- Ebrahem Shareef (Arabic: إبراهيم شريف) – Political and human rights activist.
- Parvin Habib (Born 19 October 1969 (age 57), Arabic: بروين حبيب) – Bahraini journalist, poet and TV host/presenter.
- Faten Hassan Bushehri (Arabic: فاتن حسن بوشهري) – Bahraini director.
- Ameera Ali Al-Kooheji (Arabic: أميرة الكوهجي ) – Bahraini TV presenter, Director and Producer as well as a Social media figure.

== Gallery ==
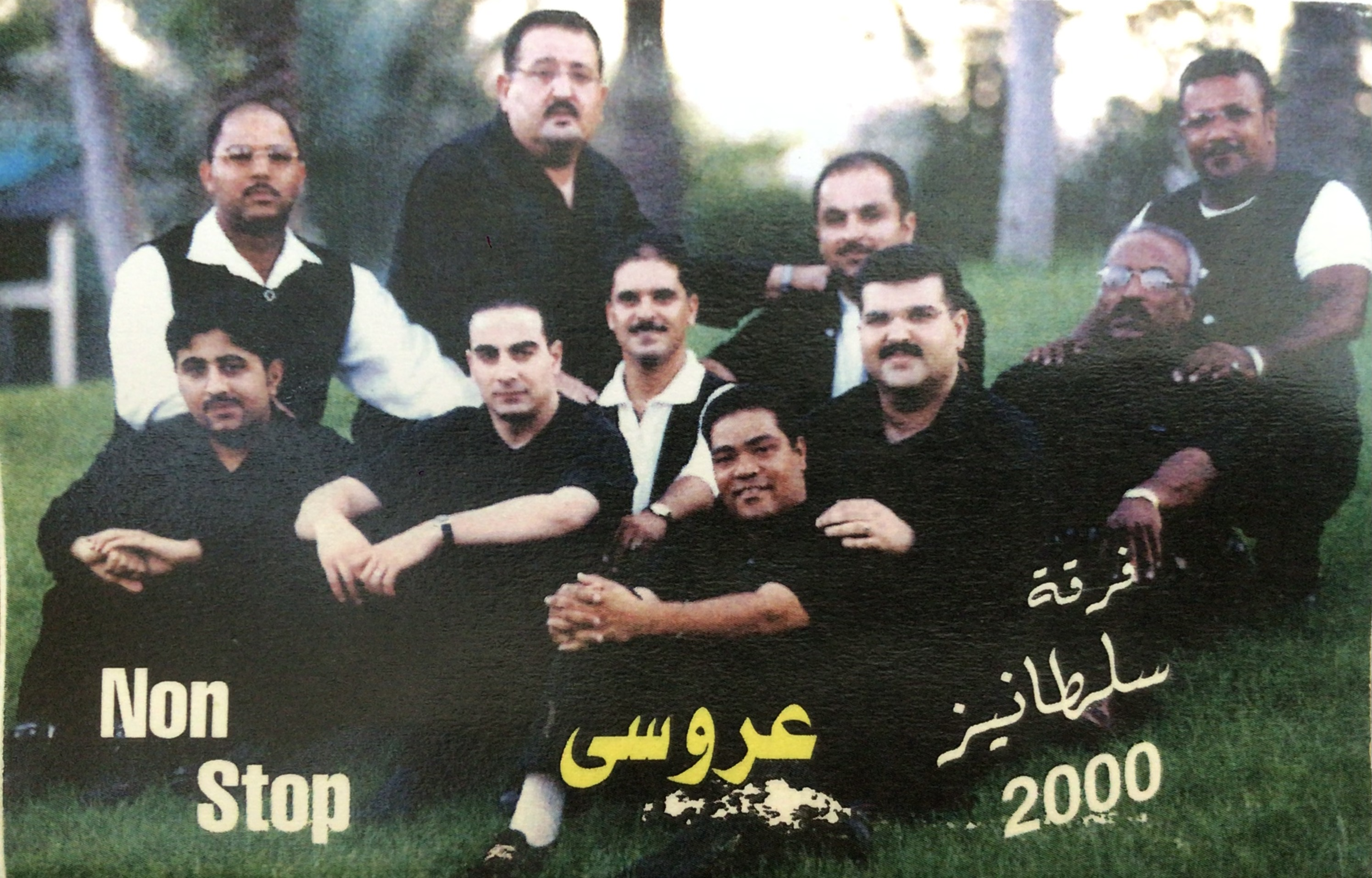
Sultanies band in their last Persian album

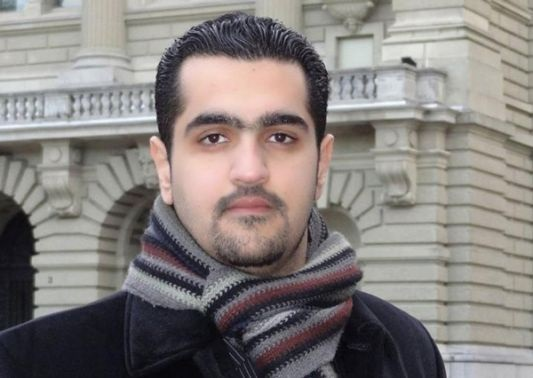
Bahraini activist Hussain Javad Parveez

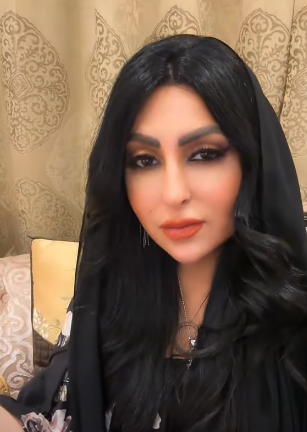
Bahraini author and actress Zainab Al-Askari

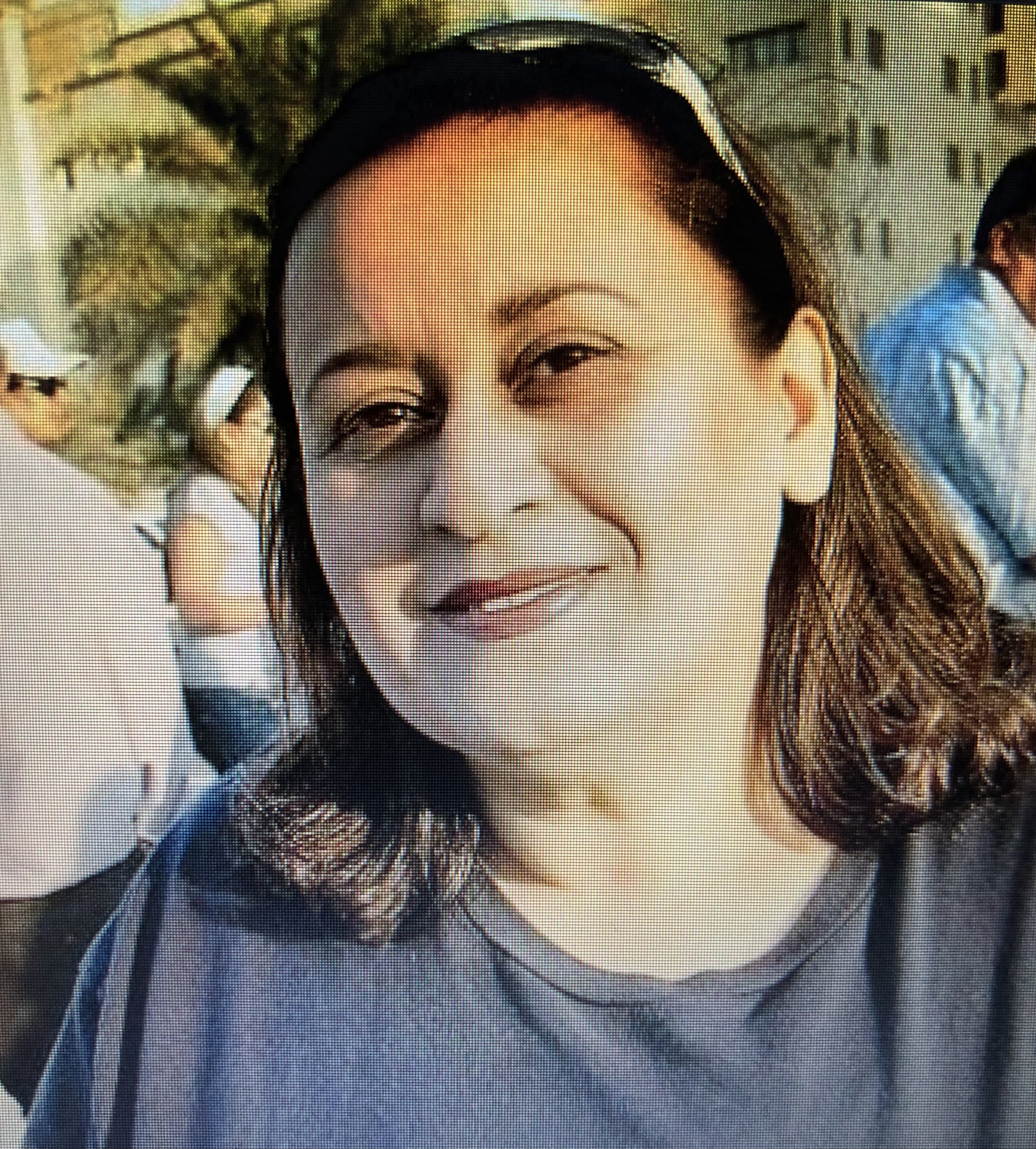
Bahraini women's rights activist Ghada Jamsheer

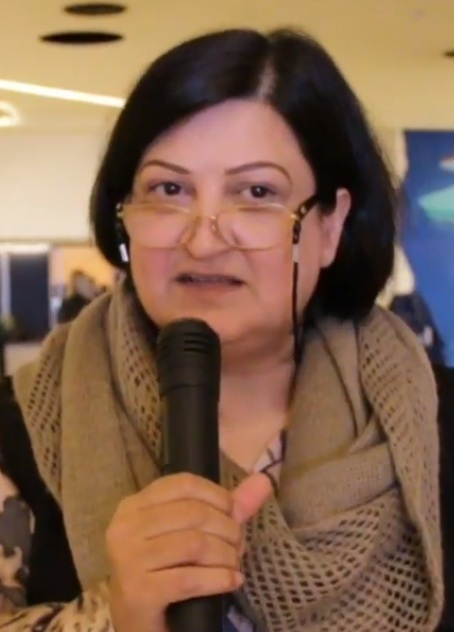
Wife of Ibraheem Sharif, former member of Waad

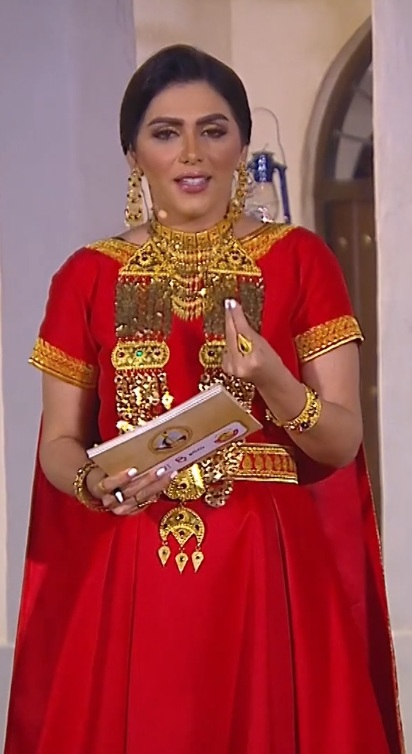
Bahraini TV presenter Neyla Janahi

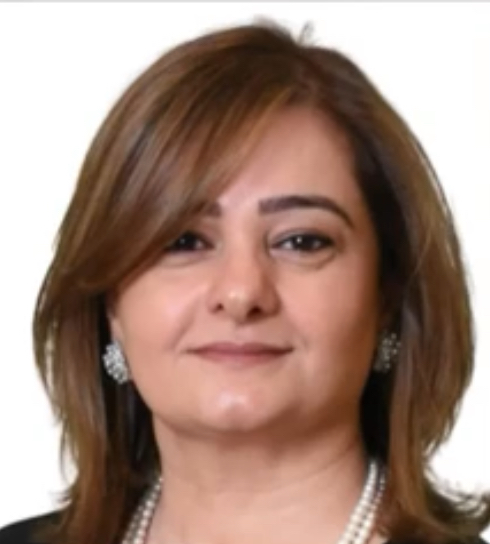
ILO West Asia Business Group representative Sonya Janahi

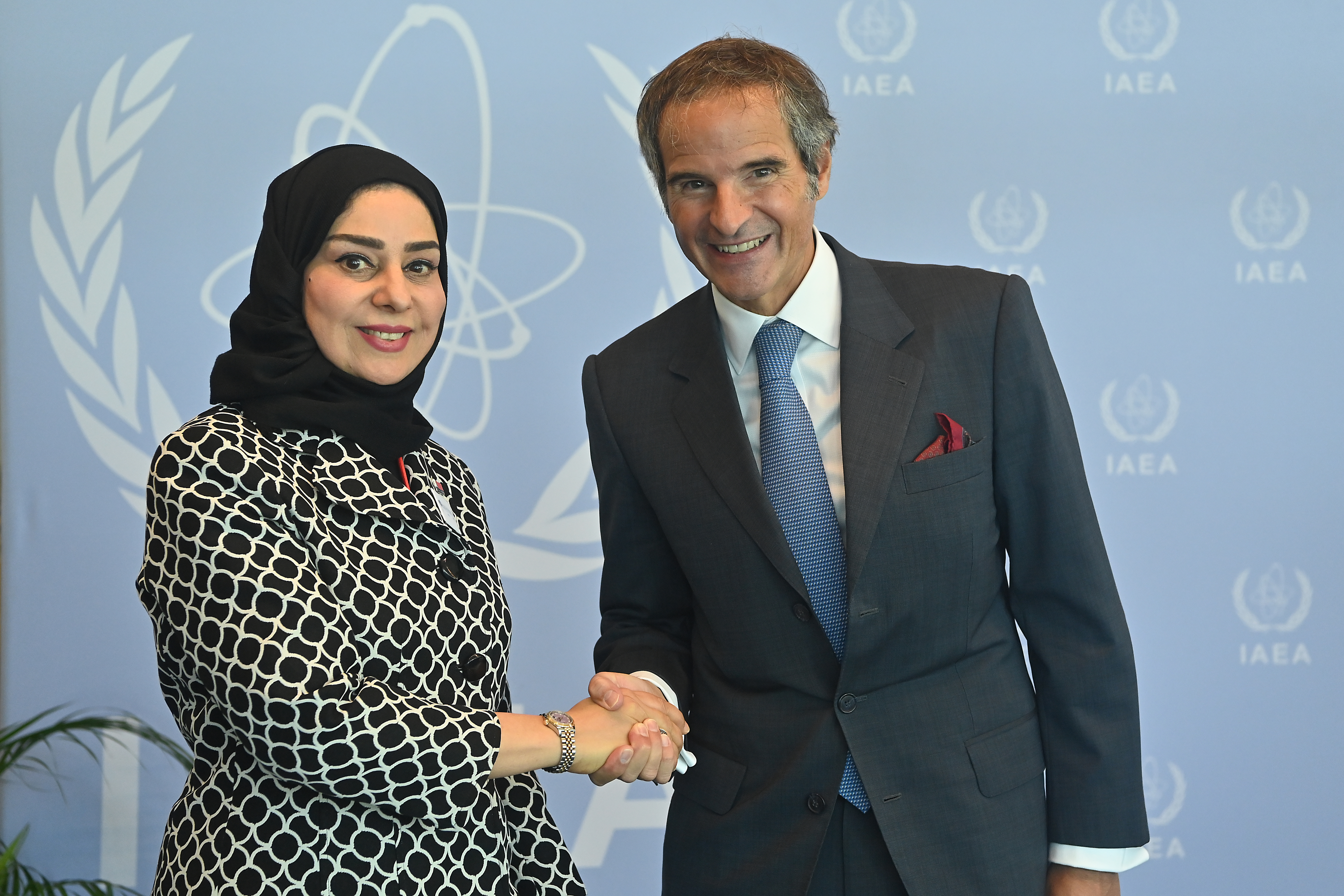
Fawzia Abdullah Zainal

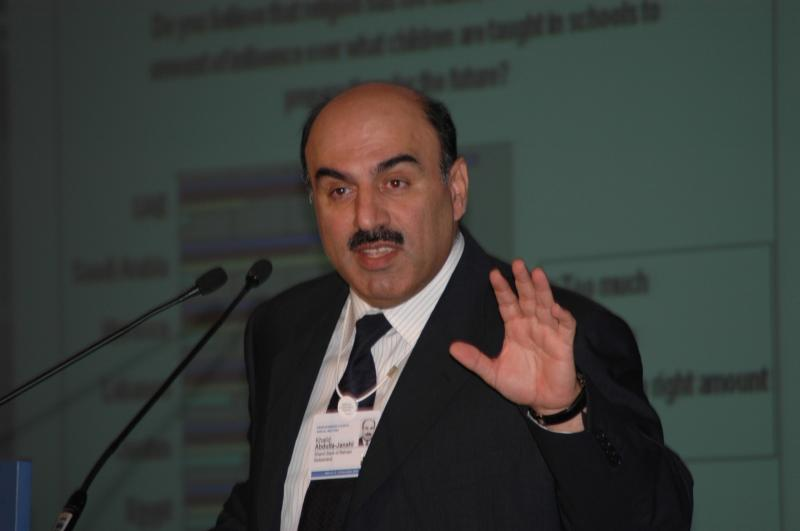
Chairman of Vision 3 and Member of Bahrain EDB Khaled Janahi

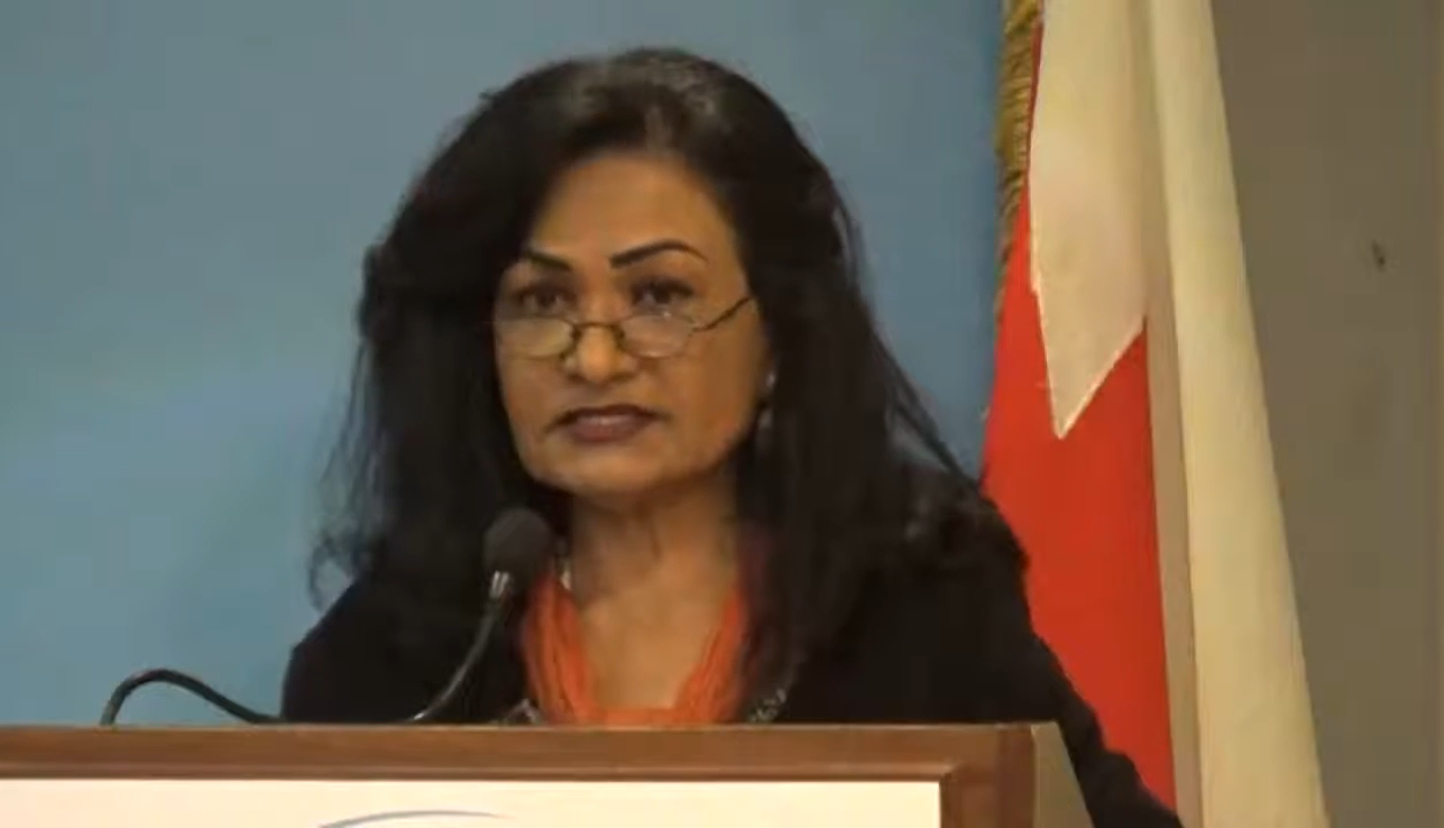
Bahraini poet Eman Aseery

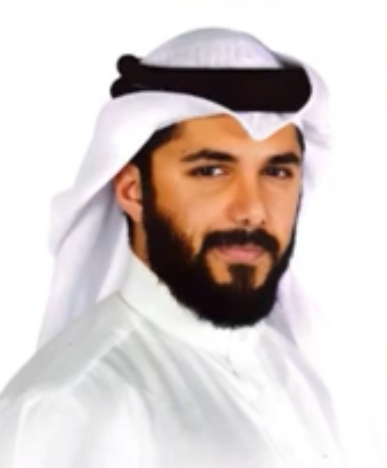
Mohammed Falamarzi

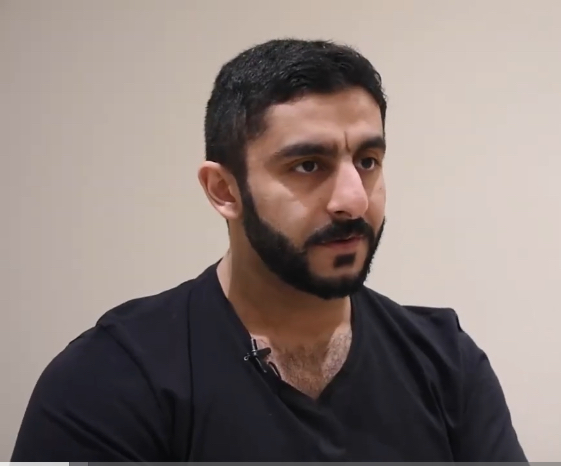
Bahraini artist Ahmed Al-Bastaki

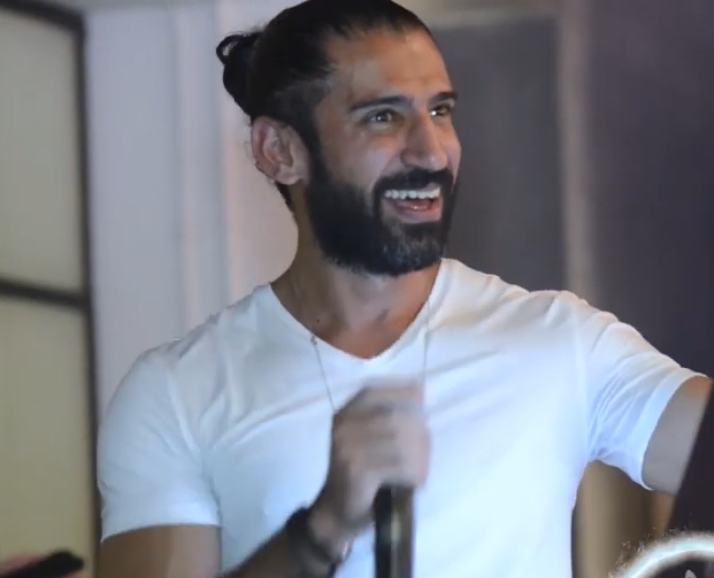
Bahraini singer Khalid Fouad

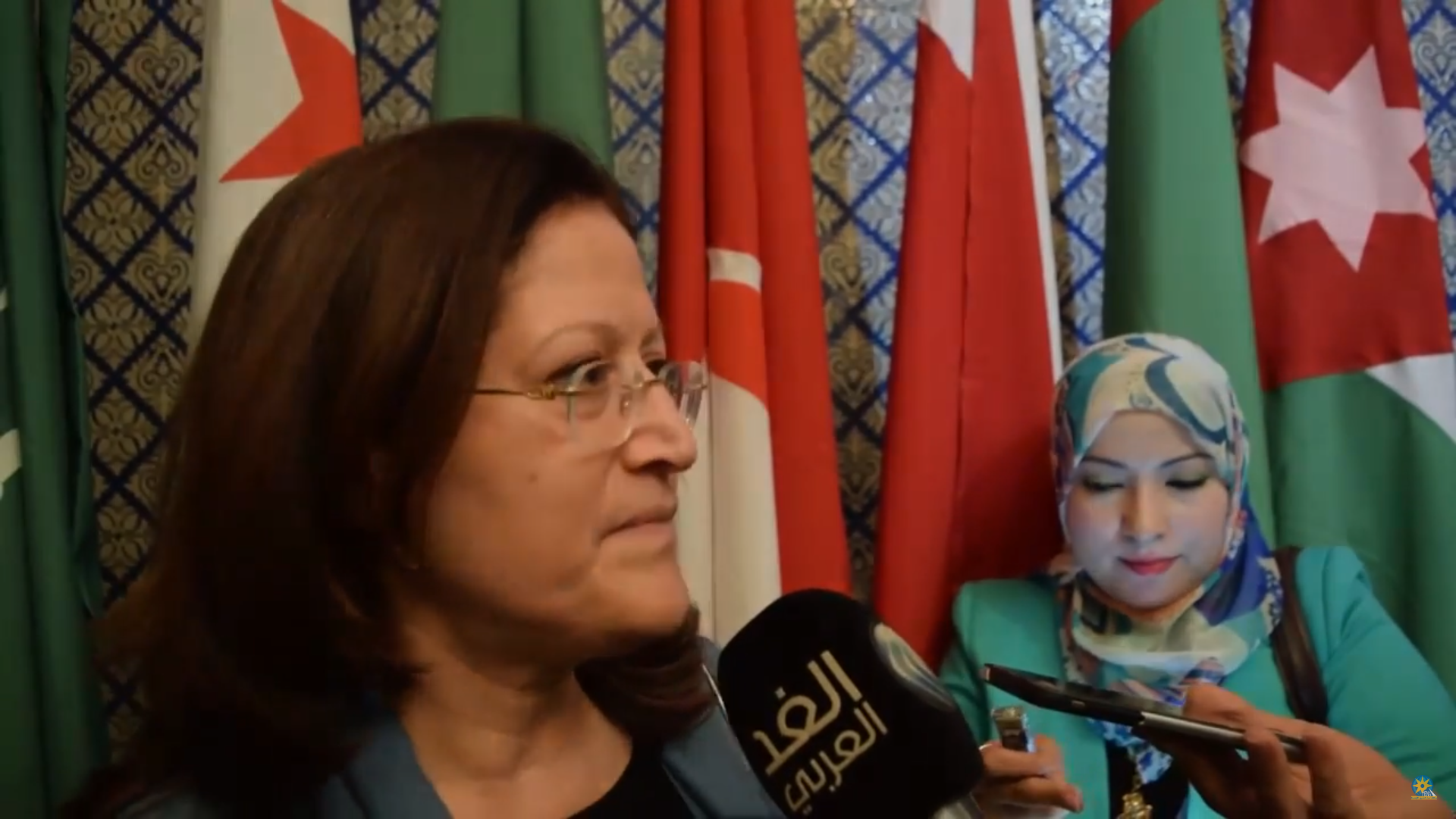
Ba'athist political activist Samira Rajab

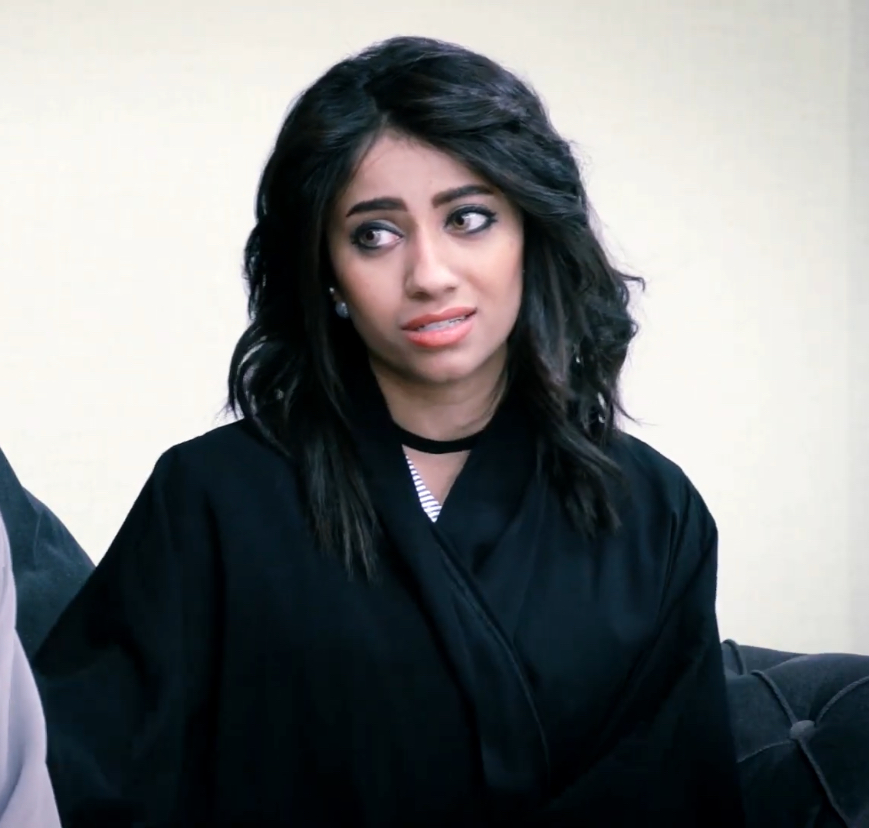
Bahraini host and actress Fatima Kaziruni

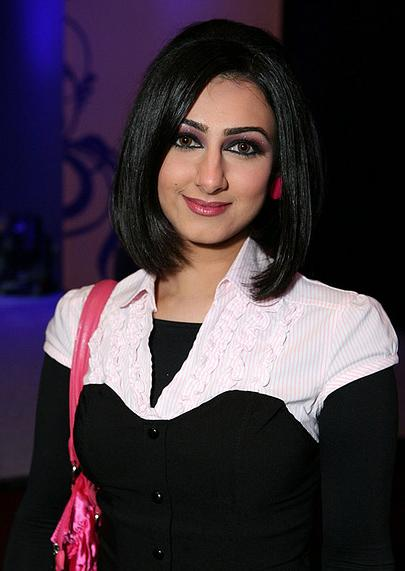
Bahraini actress and singer Haifa Hussain

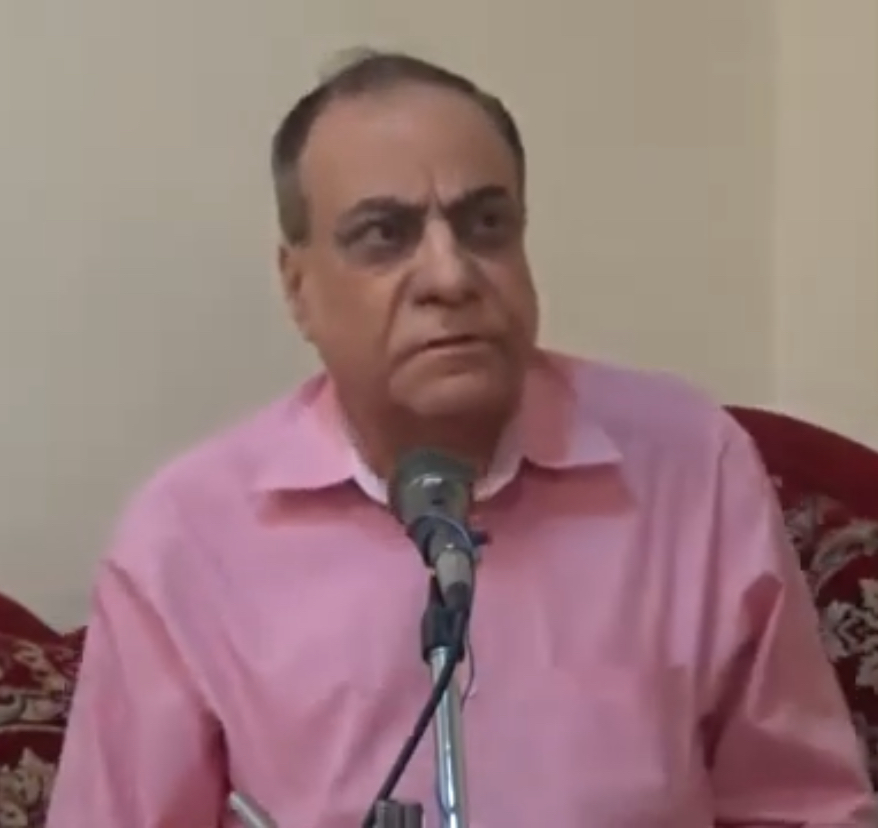
Progressive Forum Central Committee member Prof. Hamid Khanji

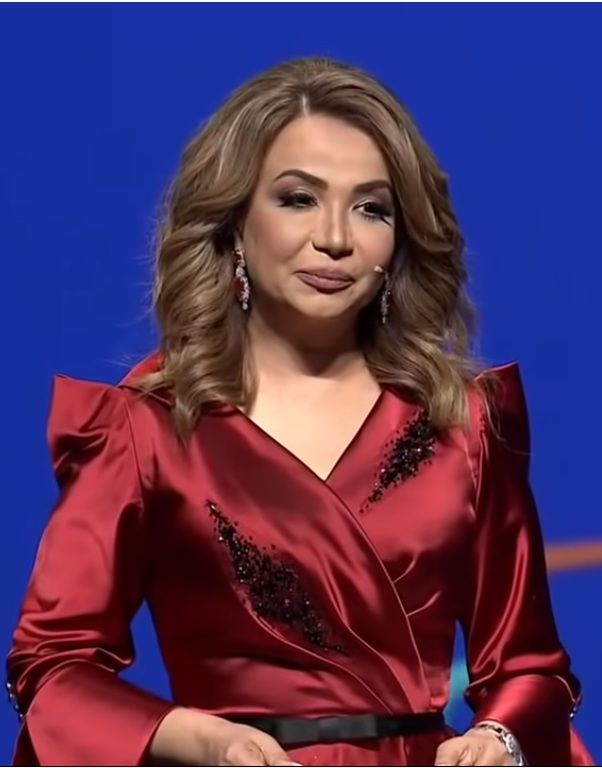
Parvin Habib, Bahraini poet, journalist and TV presenter

== See also ==
- Achomi people
- History of Bahrain
- Baharna
- Iranian diaspora
- 'Ajam of Kuwait
