= Casualties of the 2011 Bahraini uprising and its aftermath =

dAs of 15 March 2013, the Bahraini uprising of 2011 and its aftermath resulted in 122 deaths. The number of injuries is hard to determine due to government clampdown on hospitals and medical personnel. The last accurate estimate for injuries dates back to 16 March 2011 and stands at about 2708. The Bahrain Independent Commission of Inquiry concluded that many detainees were subjected to torture and other forms of physical and psychological abuse while in custody, five of whom were returned as dead bodies. The BICI report found the government responsible for 20 deaths (November 2011). Opposition activists say that the current number is 88 including 43 who allegedly died as a result of excessive use of tear gas.

== Injuries ==
The total number of injured since the start of the uprising is not known, partly due to protesters' fear of getting arrested in hospital when presenting with protest-related injuries. As of 16 March 2011, the total number was at least 2,708. Another 200 people were treated for their injuries by Médecins Sans Frontières outside hospitals, for a total of 2,908. A medic who asked to remain anonymous said he secretly treats about 50 injured protesters a week. Among the injured is Nabeel Rajab, a leading human rights activist.

Minister of Interior Rashid bin Abdullah Al Khalifa claimed that 395 police officers were injured, four of them allegedly "abducted and tortured".

== Deaths ==
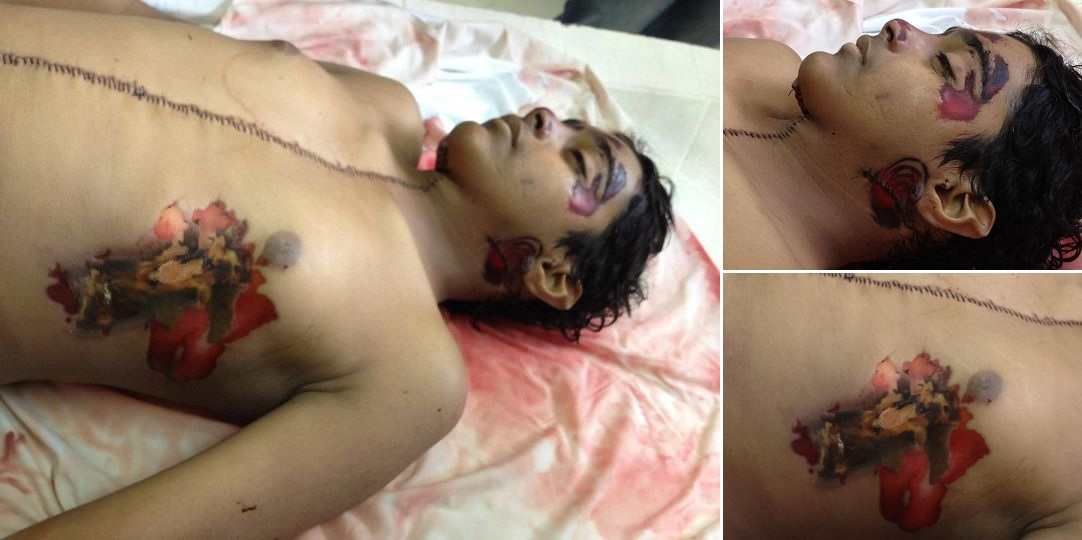
The government claims that the burns on Sayed Hashim's body were inconsistent with burns caused by a tear gas canister

The Bahrain Independent Commission of Inquiry found that there were 35 deaths between 14 February and 15 April 2011 linked to the uprising. The Commission found the government responsible for 20 of these deaths, protesters responsible for 3, and mobs responsible for 2. The Commission could not attribute the remaining 10 deaths to a perpetrator. Additionally, the Commission found that there were another 11 deaths potentially linked to the uprising between 16 April and 6 October 2011. Between 7 October 2011 and 18 August 2012, the Bahrain Centre for Human Rights (BCHR) reported 35 deaths linked to the uprising, for a total of 81 deaths. On 23 April, Al Jazeera reported that more than 80 people had died since the start of the uprising. The total number reported, counting all related incidents, even those not mentioned in the BICI report and BCHR was 102 deaths as of 3 November 2012.

Bahrain's Gulf Daily News newspaper reported that anti-government protesters attacked and killed an elderly taxi driver on 13 March. Other local newspapers reported that he was beaten to death by "terrorists". Bahrain's independent Al Wasat newspaper cited witnesses that said the taxi driver died in a traffic accident. The Bahrain Independent Commission of Inquiry did not report any such death connected to the unrest. Additionally, a report by the Associated Press, quoting an unnamed security official in Saudi Arabia, stated that a Saudi soldier was shot dead by protesters in Bahrain on 15 March. Bahrain state television denied this report, and the Commission did not report any such death connected to the unrest.

Deaths
Cause of death	Civilians	Expatriates	Security Forces
Birdshot	14	–	–
Gunshot	5	1	1
Torture	5	–	–
Physical abuse	7	2	1
Auto-pedestrian collision	3	1	11
Tear gas (allegedly*)	41	2	–
Other	11	1	4
Disputed	4	-	-

* The government does not recognise most deaths that were attributed to the use of tear gas.

Deaths
Killed By	Civilians	Expatriates	Security Forces
Security Forces	23	1	1
Protesters	–	–	11
Unknown Assailants	8	2	5
Disputed	16	1	–
Security forces (allegedly)	41	1	–
Not applicable	3	1	-

* A trial for seven protesters accused of killing police is ongoing.

=== Notable deaths ===
- Ali Abdulhadi Mushaima
- Fadhel Al-Matrook
- Deaths of Bloody Thursday
- Abdulredha Buhmaid
- Zakariya Rashid Hassan al-Ashiri
- Ali Jawad al-Sheikh
- Ahmed Jaber al-Qattan
- Mohammed Mushaima

=== Details ===
Deaths
Name	Age	From	Date of death	Cause of death
Ali Abdulhadi Mushaima	21	Al Daih	14 Feb 2011	Police birdshot wound to the back from close range.
Fadhel Salman Ali Al Matrook	31	Mahooz	15 Feb 2011	Police birdshot wound to the back from close range.
Mahmood Maki Ahmed Ali Abutaki	22	Sitra	17 Feb 2011	Police birdshot wound to the back from close range.
Ali Mansoor Ahmed Ahmed Khudair	53	Sitra	17 Feb 2011	Police birdshot wound to the back from close range.
Isa Abdulhasan Ali Hussain	60	Karzakan	17 Feb 2011	Police birdshot wound to the head from a distance of a few centimeters.
Ali Ahmed Abdulla Moumen	22	Sitra	17 Feb 2011	Police birdshot wound to the thighs from close range.
Abdulredha Mohamed Hasan Buhumaid	28	Malkiya	21 Feb 2011	Sustained at least two live bullets to the head when the Bahrain Defence Force opened fire on mourners with M16 rifles, Dilmun rifles, and Browning .50 caliber machine guns mounted on armored vehicles on 18 February 2011. The Bahrain Defence Force denies firing the lethal shot, on the basis of an ordnance expert's report that concluded the shot was fired from a high elevation.
Fadak Habib Nasser Mushaima	(died immediately after being born)	Al Daih	27 Feb 2011	Bahrain Justice and Development Movement (BJDM) said she was born dead "after her mother's grief on relative martyr Ali Mushaima".
Abdul Malik Ghulam Rasool	34	Pakistan	13 Mar 2011	Severe chest contusion resulting in acute heart failure, attacked by a mob.
Ali Ebrahim Abdulla Al Demistani	17	Demistan	13 Mar 2011	Struck by a car driven by unknowns near the Pearl Roundabout.
Rashid Hamad Rashid Al Moa'ammary	80	Riffa	13 Mar 2011	Government claimed he was stabbed and beaten by "outlaws". Al Wasat newspaper said a witness saw him die in a car accident. A video uploaded on 13 March supports the account published by Al Wasat. Pictures showing Al-Moa'ammary dead in his car were released into Flickr.
Ahmed Farhan Ali Farhan	30	Sitra	15 Mar 2011	Police birdshot wound to the head from close range. Ahmed's head after being shot (caution, shocking content) on YouTube
Mohammad Ikhlas Tozzumul Ali	50	Bangladesh	15 Mar 2011	Died due to getting attacked which led to internal bleeding while he was in Sitra. Witnesses quoted in a government report say he "was run over by a car driven by protesters". A separate witness report received by the Bahrain Independent Commission of Inquiry claims that he was hit by vehicles without license plates driven by unknown individuals, one of whom was associated with government forces. He was buried on 23 March in Golapganj, Sylhet, Bangladesh.
Ahmed Rashid Al Muraysi	30	Sitra	15 Mar 2011	According to information BICI received, he was struck by a car driven by demonstrators in Sitra.
Jaafar Mohamed Abdali Salman	40	Karrana	16 Mar 2011	Police gunshot injury to the chest.
Ahmed Abdulla Hasan Al Arnoot	22	Hamad Town	16 Mar 2011	Three close range birdshot injuries to the back.
Jaafar Abdulla Ali Hasan Mayoof	32	A'ali	16 Mar 2011	Close range gunshot injuries to the back and chest area; shot by security forces.
Stephen Abraham	48	India	16 Mar 2011	.50 caliber Browning Gun bullet to the right side of his chest fired by the Bahrain Defence Force.
Kashif Ahmed Mandhour	20	Pakistan	16 Mar 2011	Head and chest trauma, damage to internal organs and internal bleeding; struck by a car driven by demonstrators near the Pearl Roundabout.
Mohamed Farooq Abdulsamad	-	Pakistan	16 Mar 2011	Severe head injury and hypovolemic shock; struck by a car driven by demonstrators near the Pearl Roundabout.
Riaz Ahmed	43	Pakistan	18 Mar 2011	Crushed to death by a falling cement arch while operating a crane to destroy the Pearl Roundabout. This death was not included in BICI report.
Isa Radhi Abdali Ahmed Alradhi	45	Sitra	19 Mar 2011	According to the government, the cause of death was a fractured skull and internal bleeding caused by head trauma while in police custody. A witness says he saw Isa being beaten by 15 police officers for around 20 minutes.
Hani Abdulaziz Abdulla Jumaa	32	Khamis	19 Mar 2011	Three or more police gunshot injuries to his right leg, left leg, and left arm. He escaped to a building under-construction where he was severely beaten and left to die in a pool of his blood. The Bahrain Independent Commission of Inquiry reports that he sustained the gunshots while running away from police. Human Rights Watch investigated the room where Hani was found, and discovered fragments of his kneecap, proving he was shot from close range. Also, they found tissues in the ceiling and wall as well as a tooth. Human Rights Watch quotes witnesses as saying that Hani was shot point-blank with a shotgun.
Fareed Maqbul	N/A	Bangladesh	19 Mar 2011	Multiple trauma injuries to the head and face. A witness says that Fareed was attacked by unknown individuals carrying wooden planks and sharp objects, and was struck by a vehicle while attempting to escape.
Jawad Ali Kadhem Al Shamlan	48	Al Hajar	20 Mar 2011	The cause of death was a bullet fired from a Browning .50 caliber machine gun by the Bahrain Defence Force. The Bahrain Defence Force say that Jawad's car and another car were approaching a checkpoint when they were told to turn back. The other car complied, but Jawad's car instead accelerated, ramming into a barricade in front of the checkpoint. After the collision, Jawad's car continued to approach the checkpoint, at which point the Bahrain Defence Force fired a warning shot, and a shot at the tires, which was deflected off of a tire and the vehicle's body before entering Jawad's left knee and exiting from his abdomen. Jawad's family say they contacted the police station where he worked after Jawad failed to answer his mobile phone. The police first claimed to not know Jawad's whereabouts, then stated Jawad was on "a special mission" and could not talk on the phone, and finally stated that Jawad had entered a brawl with the army and they were detaining him until the morning. The family later called Jawad's mobile phone, and reached an individual who claimed to have killed Jawad. The family continued receiving calls from Jawad's mobile phone, including one call impersonating Jawad. Jawad's family has been unable to recover his car or his mobile phones. Amateur video of Jawad's corpse shows injuries to the front of his left knee and the front of his lower abdomen on the left side, as well as injuries to his back. A follow-up government report said that there was no evidence of a crime in his death.
Abdulrasool Hasan Ali Mohamed Hujair	37	Boori	20 Mar 2011	Traumatic injuries to the chest, stomach, back and limbs, which led to bleeding and shock. His body was found in Awali.
Bahiya Abdelrasool Alaradi	51	Arad, lived in Manama	21 Mar 2011	The cause of death was a Bahrain Defence Force gunshot injury to the head. A medical report says that she sustained a shot to the back of her head, and a shot to her left shoulder with an exit wound. Witnesses say that Bahia's car was first hit from the front by a bullet, and was then hit by a sniper round. Amateur video of Bahia's car, apparently taken the morning after the shooting, shows a bullet hole in the windshield, and a bullet hole in the rear window. The Bahrain Defence Force claims that Bahia was hit in the back of her head by shrapnel from a .50 caliber bullet that splintered as it hit a hard surface after it was fired at an SUV containing two intoxicated westerners who failed to stop at a military checkpoint. Two armored vehicles fitted with Browning .50 caliber machine guns were present at the checkpoint where Bahia was shot. A follow-up government report said that BDF personnel acted in accordance with rules of engagement, and that there was no evidence of a crime in her death.
Aziz Jumaa Ali Ayyad	37	Al Hajar	24 Mar 2011	The cause of death was a heart attack. The family reports there were signs of electric shocks on the body, marks on his hands, chest, and a piercing in his stomach. A follow-up government report said that an examination of his body did hot show any injuries, and said there was no evidence of a crime in his death.
Isa Mohamed Ali Abdulla	71	Ma'ameer	25 Mar 2011	According to the report of the Bahrain Independent Commission of Inquiry, no autopsy was conducted, no cause of death was recorded, and the government had not conducted any investigation into his death. The Interior Ministry issued a statement that he died of natural causes. Al Wasat reported that he suffocated when tear gas fired by government forces entered his home. A follow-up government report gave the cause of death as complications from lung cancer, and said a blood test showed no evidence that the deceased had inhaled tear gas.
Hawra Mohammed Saeed	(died immediately after being born)	Sanabis	29 Mar 2011	Bahrain Justice and Development Movement said she was born dead "because of toxic gases (fired by riot police) that suffocated her mother in her pregnancy".
Sayed Ahmed Shams	14	Sar	30 Mar 2011	No autopsy was conducted, no cause of death has been recorded, and the government has not conducted an effective investigation into his death. Relatives claim to have witnessed him being hit in the head with a tear gas canister fired by police. His father reports that the doctor diagnosed the cause of death as a broken neck.
Hasan Jassim Mohamed Maki	39	Karzakan	3 Apr 2011	The cause of death was attributed to cardiac arrest induced by sickle-cell disease. Amnesty International and Médecins Sans Frontières examined the body, and reported the presence of wounds inflicted by sharp objects, suggesting that he had been tortured while detained. His medical condition may have been neglected while he was in government custody; BICI attributed his death to torture.
Khadija Merza Abbas Yusuf Abdulhay	N/A	Sanabis	5 Apr 2011	The cause of death was bilateral nodular disease and acute pneumonitis caused by severe septic shock. Her family says they took her to the hospital after she inhaled a large amount of tear gas fired by police on 15 March, and were told to come back the following day. They could not access the hospital until 20 March, at which point she was hospitalized and treated for 5 days. Her condition progressively worsened until she died.
Sayed Hameed Mahfoudh Ibrahim Al Mahfoudh	61	Sar	6 Apr 2011	The cause of death was respiratory and circulatory failure. His family report that they found his body in a black plastic bag with signs of physical assault and suffocation. They also report that the police refused to examine the body for some time. While looking for the body, the family saw his car in a police station and tried to approach the vehicle but were stopped by police. The family later found his car in the parking lot of a nearby coffee shop. A follow-up government report said that he died due to natural causes.
Zakariya Rashid Hassan Al Asheri	40	Al Dair	9 Apr 2011	Officially the cause of death is massive heart failure and cardiac arrest following complications of sickle-cell disease while in Ministry of the Interior custody. His family reported that he had never previously experienced harmful effects of sickle-cell disease despite being a carrier. Although the Ministry of Interior informed the family that he had died from sickle-cell disease while asleep, a blindfolded cellmate described hearing prison guards enter their cell and beat Zakariya to death when he refused to be quiet. BICI attributed his death to torture.
Ali Isa Ibrahim Saqer	31	Sehla	9 Apr 2011	The cause of death was hypovolemic shock due to multiple traumas sustained during torture in the custody of the Ministry of the Interior. His body was covered with red bruises, in particular on the back of the hands and around the right eye. The Ministry of the Interior claimed that he had died from injuries received while resisting security forces. Leading human rights defender Nabeel Rajab was reported to the Military Prosecutor by the Interior Ministry for posting allegedly doctored photos of Ali Saqer's corpse to his Twitter account. The photographs were confirmed as genuine by a Human Rights Watch investigator who had seen the body prior to burial. BICI attributed his death to torture.
Abdulkarim Ali Ahmed Fakhrawi	49	Karbabad	11 Apr 2011	The cause of death was injuries sustained during torture while in NSA custody. Despite government claims that Fakhrawi's death had occurred during a brawl with two NSA officers and was due to kidney failure, witnesses reported hearing him screaming while receiving beatings and then suddenly the screaming stopped, after which one individual said to another, "you killed him."
Aziza Hasan Khamis	25	Bilad Al Qadeem	16 Apr 2011	The cause of death was cardiac arrest and cessation of breathing. She allegedly turned yellow and died from extreme stress after police broke down the door to her house and began choking her brother, and beating and kicking a neighbor's son. A medical report states that she suffered from type 1 diabetes, rendering her vulnerable to psychological stress. A follow-up government report said there was no evidence of a crime in her death.
Mohamed Abdulhusain Farhan	6	Sitra	30 Apr 2011	Allegedly died from suffocation after inhaling tear gas fired by police outside his home. A follow-up government report gave the cause of his death as "1. Cerebral infarction; 2. Possible lupus; 3. General nervous breakdown; 4. Kidney inflammation," and stated that there was no evidence of a crime in his death.
Zainab Ali Ahmed	69	Sanabis	2 Jun 2011	The cause of death was a sharp decline in circulation and respiration. She suffered from asthma. She allegedly inhaled tear gas fired by police, and fell over. An ambulance taking her to the hospital was allegedly subjected to delays at several checkpoints, including two checkpoints where a medic providing breathing assistance to Zainab was questioned. Bahraini authorities denied she died as a result of inhaling tear gas claiming she died of a "chronic heart disease", and that her family said she died of natural causes. A follow-up government report said that she died on the way to the hospital, that the family declined an autopsy, and that there was no evidence of a crime in her death.
Salman Isa Abuidrees	63	Manama, lived in Isa Town	3 Jun 2011	The cause of death was a heart attack caused by heightened blood pressure. He suffered from diabetes. He was allegedly stopped, beaten, and abducted by police after they saw a photo of Hassan Nasrallah on his mirror on 13 March. It emerged later that Salman was in the hospital. When his injuries were allegedly not treated, his family attempted to have him discharged but the hospital refused. After some time, the family was informed that he was undergoing surgery, after which he was transferred to intensive care, where he died.
Jaber Ebrahim Yousif Mohamed	41	Khamis	12 Jun 2011	The cause of death was injuries sustained while in Ministry of the Interior custody. 20 days after his detention Alawiyat's family was allowed to visit him and reported seeing bruises on his face, head and the left hand, which he was unable to move. He was released from custody on 9 June and left outside the entrance to a hospital. He died after three days complaining of stomach pains. A follow-up government report said that "there were no suspicions and/or indications of a criminal act" in his death, and further stated that a sample of his urine tested positive for morphine and hashish.
Hassan Al Sitry	70	Nuwaidrat	19 Jun 2011	Stabbed on the head with a sharp object by unknowns while returning home from mosque after Fajr prayer. On 28 December, the criminal court sentenced an unnamed male to 7 years prison after convicting him with unintentional murder.
Sayed Adnan Hasan Al Musawi	44	Al Markh	23 Jun 2011	Died from suffocation after inhaling tear gas fired by police at religious rituals in Diraz. A follow-up government report stated that he was suffering from AIDS, Hepatitis C, and an unspecified "psychological disorder." The report pointed to an infection as the cause of death, and said there was no evidence of a crime.
Majeed Ahmed Mohamed Ali Abdulaal	30	Sehla	30 Jun 2011	The cause of death was a shotgun injury sustained on 14 March 2011 to the right side of his head. He was transferred to a military hospital on 7 April, where he underwent an operation on 29 June and died the following morning.
Zainab Hasan Ahmed Jumaa	38	Sitra	15 Jul 2011	While her death certificate does not identify a cause of death, medical documents say she died of cardiopulmonary arrest. She allegedly died from suffocation after inhaling tear gas thrown by police outside her house. The tear gas entered her room through an air conditioning vent. She could not move out of her room, as she suffered from paraplegia, but a relative carried her out. A follow-up government report said that she died of natural causes, and that her blood tested negative for tear gas.
Isa Ahmed Al Taweel	50	Sitra	31 Jul 2011	Died from suffocation after inhaling tear gas fired by police. A follow-up government report stated that he died from "bacterial poisoning," which aggravated his diabetes, heart disease, and high blood pressure and cholesterol.
Ali Jawad Alsheikh	14	Sitra	31 Aug 2011	The cause of death was "a fractured spine, internal bleeding, and shock". Witnesses report that they heard shots immediately after seeing a policeman holding a tear gas gun standing out of the top window of a police SUV that was chasing protesters. The Interior Ministry conducted an autopsy, during which investigators from the Bahrain Independent Commission of Inquiry were present. Both the Ministry and the Commission compiled separate forensic reports. The Ministry's report concluded that Ali's injuries were inconsistent with an impact from a tear gas canister because the markings on his neck were too large. The Commission's report concluded that Ali's injuries were consistent with an impact from an unexploded tear gas canister fired at short range. Ali was allegedly refused treatment at a hospital, and subsequently died. The government claims there were no police in the area at the time of the shooting, and has offered a 10,000 Bahraini dinar reward for his death. No progress had been made in the investigation as of the release of the Bahrain Independent Commission of Inquiry's final report on 23 November.
Sayed Jawad Ahmed Hashim Marhoon	36	Sitra	14 Sep 2011	The cause of death was acute chest syndrome as a consequence of sickle-cell disease, although his relatives claim he did not suffer from sickle-cell disease. His death certificate also states that he suffered from pneumonia. His relatives stated that he began suffering breathing problems, as well as head and chest pains after tear gas entered his room on 10 September. Three days later, his family called an ambulance after he was experiencing pains and was unable to breathe. A follow-up government report said there was no evidence of a crime in his death.
Jaafar Hasan Yusuf	29	Demistan	18 Sep 2011	No autopsy was conducted and no cause of death has been recorded. Witnesses say police physically attacked him on two occasions in March, causing severe bruising to his body. He was admitted to a hospital for three days, after which he went to receive treatment in Jordan, where he was diagnosed with Hepatitis and a bowel perforation. He returned to a hospital in Bahrain where he eventually died. A follow-up government report gave the cause of death as "cryptococcal meningitis, AIDS, and granulamatous hepatitis" and said there was no evidence of a crime in his death.
Jaafar Lutfallah	74	Abu Saiba	30 Sep 2011	His family says that he died in a hospital after suffocation from tear gas fired by police on 18 September. The family says that a doctor decided to keep him in the hospital due to the large amount of tear gas he had inhaled. According to the Bahrain Centre for Human Rights (BCHR), he suffered from paraplegia. A follow-up government report gave the cause of death as "1. Nosocomial pneumonia; 2. Chronic coronary obstructions; 3. Coronary heart disease; 4. Chronic kidney failure," and stated that there was no evidence of a crime in his death.
Ahmed Jaber Al Qattan	16	Shakhura	6 Oct 2011	The cause of death was birdshot injuries to the chest. Witnesses report that police shot him. The government first issued a statement saying he was killed by "a police birdshot." The government later deleted the reference to police birdshot from their statement, claiming only that he was killed by "a birdshot." The government now claims that the birdshot used is not a type of birdshot used by police.
Riyadh Hassan Rashed	50	Karrana	29 Oct 2011	Died in Iran due to sustained injuries. The official reason for death is heart failure. He lost his eye allegedly due to a rubber bullet fired by Bahraini security forces and traveled to Iran for treatment. According to an activist Riyadh had birdshot injuries and underwent a number of surgeries in Iran to remove their remains.
Ali Hassan Al Daihi	70	Al Daih	3 Nov 2011	Suffered cardiac arrest the day after he was attacked in the evening by police.
Ali Yousif Baddah	16	Sitra	19 Nov 2011	Died when a speeding police vehicle squeezed him into a wall in Juffair. The government claims that the policeman lost control of his vehicle after driving over a pool of oil on a narrow street.
Abdulnabi Kadhem	44	A'ali	23 Nov 2011	Bahrain Centre for Human Rights claims he died after his car was rammed into a wall by a speeding police SUV.
Zahra Saleh	27	Al Daih	7 Dec 2011	She died after a metal rod became embedded in her head. The government claims that protesters threw the rod when she turned to security forces for protection. Protesters claim that police threw the iron rod. Attempts by Al Wefaq to visit her in the hospital were rebuffed by Ministry of Interior employees.
Sajida Faisal Jawad	5 days	Bilad Al Qadeem	11 Dec 2011	According to her parents, she died after getting suffocated by tear gas. Ministry of Health claims Sajida died due to bacterial infection.
Ali Ahmed Alqassab	21	Manama, lived in Abu Saiba	15 Dec 2011	Allegedly struck by a civilian car while being chased by police.
Abdali Ali Ahmed	73	Muqsha	17 Dec 2011	Allegedly died from tear gas inhalation. Ministry of Interior claim he died of "natural causes".
Sayed Hashim Saeed Al Mumin	15	Sitra, lived in Hamad Town	31 Dec 2011	A medical report gave the cause of death as hematomas and bleeding as a result of a neck injury, and noted burns on the bottom-left of his chest and his left forearm. Police allegedly fired two tear gas canisters at his chest and neck from close range. The government released a statement claiming that the burns on Hashim's body were inconsistent with burns caused by a tear gas canister. The statement also said preliminary investigations showed that Sayed participated in attacks on security forces with molotov cocktails that took place throughout the day, and that a full investigation was underway.
Fakhriyya Jassim Mohamed Al Sakran	55	Busaiteen, lived in Jid Ali	3 Jan 2012	Allegedly died after inhaling tear gas on 1 January. Her family reported that she was in good health until she inhaled the gas.
Yousif Ahmed Muwali	24	Galali	11 Jan 2012	Yousif Ahmed Muwali went missing on 9 January. When his family filed a missing persons report on 11 January, they were told by a police officer that Yousif was at the General Directorate of Criminal Investigations and Forensic Evidence (CID) in Adliya. The Ministry of the Interior denied having Mulawi in their custody. They claimed that he had drowned and his body had been found after being washed ashore on the Amwaj Islands on 13 January. The death certificate indicated that death had occurred approximately 2 days previously. MOI proceeded to carry out an autopsy without obtaining the consent of the family, who were not allowed to see the body until the following morning. His family said there were obvious signs of torture such as cigarette burns and bruises on his body, especially head, neck and arm. Despite the family's claim that Mulawi had been tortured to death the Ministry of the Interior insisted that the cause of death had been drowning. Al Wefaq called for an international independent investigation in the case, alleging a loss of all confidence in the integrity of the Bahraini judiciary and security forces. The body was only handed back to the family on 21 January - 10 days after Mulawi's death. The funeral took place in Muharraq the same day.
Badriya Ali	59	Sanabis	14 Jan 2012	Bahrain Centre for Human Rights claims that she set herself on fire after she "suffered from severe depression for months" after her son was arrested and beaten by security forces in front of her.
Salma Mohsin	21	Barbar	15 Jan 2012	Bahrain Centre for Human Rights claims she died as a result of suffocation by teargas when security forces fired a canister into her house.
Yaseen Jassim Al-Asfoor	11 or 14	Ma'ameer	20 Jan 2012	Bahrain Centre for Human Rights claims that he died after being hospitalized 3 weeks prior to his death as a result of inhaling tear gas. Information Affairs Authority claims that Yaseen died as a result of a hereditary disease.
Mohamed Khamis al-Khunaizi	24 or 25	Jidhafs	20 Jan 2012	February 14 Youth Coalition and rights groups claim he died as a result of inhaling tear gas. However, Information Affairs Authority said Mohamed was discovered dead from a drug overdose.
Saeed Ali Hassan Al-Sikry	65	Noaim, lived in A'ali	25 Jan 2012	His family said he died due to "excessive tear gas that was thrown in the area the night before". Physicians for Human Rights (PHR) also reported he died due to tear gas inhalation. Information Affairs Authority said Al-Sikry fell while in the bathroom on January 25 and died in hospital. Blood tests were ordered but no results were released (as of 2 February 2012).
Abbas Jaffaar al-Sheikh	25	Al Daih	25 Jan 2012	Information Affairs Authority said Abbas who had cancer since last year, was admitted to hospital but died on January 25 after undergoing surgery. However, BCHR said al-Sheikh was a protester injured many times with birdshot and that exposure to tear gas "may have sped up the cancer". They demanded an "independent forensic examination of the deceased". Al Jazeera reported that "studies on the cancer-causing effects of tear gas have been inconclusive". February 14 Youth Coalition named him a "field leader" blaming his death on injures he sustained.
Muntathar Saeed Fakhar	37	Al Daih	25 Jan 2012	General Directorate of Traffic said that Muntather died in hospital after sustaining injuries as a result of car accident with security forces. They claimed he had high percentage of alcohol and anesthetic drugs in his blood, blaming him for the accident. However, BCHR said Fakhar died due to torture in Hoora police station. Citing a witness they said he was beaten at the time of arrest after the accident. They also cited an image saying it "looks like marks of a shoe on the head of the victim".
Mohammed Ibrahim Yacoub	17 or 19	Sitra	26 Jan 2012	The Interior Ministry announced that Mohammed was "free of injuries," and that his death was related to his Sickle Cell Disease. A former Al Wefaq member of parliament says that witnesses saw police torture Mohamed outside a police station. The Public Prosecution reportedly objected a request to have an independent coroner examine the body.
Zahraa Ali Hassan Al-Hawwaj	69	Noaim	1 Feb 2012	Her family said she inhaled tear gas on many occasions, and her "health deteriorated immediately" after being exposed to tear gas on 12 January. Although the BCHR reported she did not suffer from illnesses in the past, she was diagnosed with lung inflammation after being hospitalized and died on 1 February. PHR also reported she died due to tear gas inhalation.
Abdali Abdulla Mohammed Al Ma'ameery	58	Ma'ameer	1 Feb 2012	The BCHR reported that his family said he died due to tear gas inhalation. PHR also reported he died due to tear gas inhalation.
Ali Isa Abdulla Al Hayki	48	Samaheej	6 Feb 2012	The BCHR reported that his family said he died due to inhaling tear gas on 1 February. PHR also reported he died due to tear gas inhalation.
Fatima Albasri	32	Nabih Saleh	12 Feb 2012	BJDM and Bahrain Youth Society for Human Rights (BYSHR) said she died as a result of complications in lung due to inhaling tear gas.
Hussain Albaqali	19	Jidhafs	17 Feb 2012	Reuters claimed that he died of burns sustained in January while burning tires in a protest timed to coincide with the 2012 Bahrain International Air Show. He did not seek timely medical attention, according to his family, due to fear of arrest. The Ministry of Interior says that Hussain's father, mother, and aunt all confirmed that Hussain had burned himself while trying to commit suicide as part of a family dispute. They further state that Hussain himself admitted to the suicide attempt, and that his confession was "recorded on audio and video tapes." The Ministry did not release any audio or video of the alleged confession with their statement. Claimed footage of the tire-burning incident that led to Hussain Albaqali's death on YouTube
Mansoor Salman	85	Sitra	19 Feb 2012	The Bahrain Centre for Human Rights said that Mansoor died as a result of a deterioration in his health that began when he inhaled tear gas fired by security forces on 2 February 2012.
Rose Nisha Naikarottu Baby Varghese	28	India, lived in Manama	21 Feb 2012	On 25 January, she entered a coma during an asthma attack that her family says may have been caused by tear gas inhalation. She died on 21 February, a day before she was to be sent home to India for treatment.
Abda Hussain	70s	Sehla	25 Feb 2012	Al Wefaq said she died of tear gas inhalation.
Habbib Kadhem Ahmed Al Mulla	60	South Sehla	29 Feb 2012	Al Manar, BCHR and BYSHR reported that he died due to tear gas inhalation.
Sayed Jaffar Salman Juma'a Al Alawi	75	Shakhura	2 Mar 2012	BCHR said he died as a result of injuries inflicted by security forces to the head and pelvis since 15 February 2011. He was reportedly in coma for a long while and even after waking up from it, he was admitted again, till his death on 2 March 2012.
Yahya Yousif	45 days	Ras Rumman	5 Mar 2012	The BCHR report that, officially, he died due to inflammation of the abdomen and acids in the blood. However, his father blamed tear gas for his son's death. He said his wife inhaled excessive amounts of tear gas while she was pregnant and lost consciousness move than 10 times a result. PHR reported he died due to "[t]ear gas exposure during mother’s pregnancy".
Sakina Ali Ahmed Marhoon	78	Abu Saiba	6 Mar 2012	Al Wefaq and BCHR reported that her family said she was hospitalized on 6 February 2012 as a result of inhaling tear gas and died on 6 March 2012.
Fadel Mirza Al Obeidi	21 or 22	Diraz	10 Mar 2012	According to the Bahrain Centre for Human Rights, police shot Mirza in the head with a tear gas canister during a peaceful protest on 1 March, and then beat him on his injury. He was declared clinically dead on 2 March, and eventually died on 10 March.
Jaffar Jassem Radhi	41	Muqsha	17 Mar 2012	BCHR, PHR and BYSHR said he died due to tear gas inhalation. Al Wefaq issued a short statement saying Radhi "died due to suffocation from toxic gases as confirmed by his family members"
Sabrie Mahfoodh Yousif	27	Shahrakkan	18 Mar 2012	Al Wefaq and BCHR reported that his family blamed tear gas for his death. Both sources said he was a victim to torture during emergency period (March to June 2011) and had an injury in his chest after being his with rubber bullets. PHR reported he died due to tear gas inhalation.
Abda Ali Abdulhussain	59	A'ali	23 Mar 2012	Her family said they believe she died as result of tear gas. Abda was recently discharged from hospital where she was diagnosed to have lung inflammation after being exposed to tear gas. On 23 March, she lost consciousness and fell in the bathroom after tear gas "spread all over place" and died before the ambulance could arrive at her house, her family reported. The next day, Abda's family submitted a complaint to a police station.
Ahmad Abdulnabi Abdulrasool	31	Shahrakkan	24 Mar 2012	His family blamed tear gas for his death. His cousin said Ahmed was a sailor and had a healthy body, however he and his sister have been sick and coughing bloody since a tear gas canister was fired into their house on 16 March evening. His family submitted a complaint to a nearby police station.
Hassan Majjid Hassan	72	Demestan	28 Mar 2012	BJDM said he died due to tear gas inhalation.
Ahmed Ismael Hassan Abdulsamad Al Salmabadi	22	Salmabad	31 Mar 2012	Ahmed, a cameraman and citizen journalist was protesting in Salmabad when he was shot by gunfire in his upper right tight and subsequently died in hospital. Witnesses said at about 1:30 am Al-Salmabadi was shot with a laser-pointed gun by a civilian car accompanying security forces. Apparently, he was targeted due to filming from a video camera, witness said. Al Wefaq blamed "militants loyal to the regime" for Al-Salmabadi's death. Interior Ministry denied police shot him and said investigations are still ongoing. "The first results of the inquiry do not enable us to identify those responsible for the gunfire," a statement by interior ministry said.
Khadija Mohamed Ali Abbas	49	Ma'ameer	5 Apr 2012	BCHR and BJDM said she died due to tear gas inhalation. A follow-up government report reported that she suffered from diabetes, hypertension, and "severe dysfunction of her triple heart valve with lung high blood pressure in the pulmonary artery." The report said there was no evidence of a crime in her death.
Sayed Mohammed Radhi Al Mahfoodh	-	Saar	13 Apr 2012	BJDM said "[r]iot police jeep rammed into the martyrs car few times near Al-Bandar roundabout, which resulted in a critical head injury".
Salah Abbas Habib	37	Bilad Al Qadeem, lived in Shakhura	21 Apr 2012	Al-Wefaq says he died after being beaten by riot police on the eve of the Bahrain Grand Prix. Rights group released photos showing "injuries from a close-range blast of birdshot" blaming security forces for his death. "He had birdshot wounds in his chest and abdomen," said the deceased brother, Hussain.
Shabeer Mammed	27	India, lived in Sanad	22 Apr 2012	BCHR linked his death to tear gas inhalation after residents in the area reported it was fired the night before. Local newspapers reported that the deceased was found dead on his bed. A resident said paramedics told him that Mammed died due to heart failure.
Batool Mohammad Sadiq Abdul-Jalil	(died immediately after being born)	Sanad	7 June 2012	According to Ahlul Bayt News Agency, she was born dead after her mother inhaled tear gas during pregnancy.
Ahmad Salim Al Dhufairi	18	Riffa, lived in Hamad Town	7 Jun 2012	Al-Watan pro-government newspaper reported he died in Jordan after receiving medical treatment for injuries when a "strange object" set up by "terrorists" exploded near his home in Hamad Town on 18 April while he was trying to remove burning tires set by protesters in the street. According to the newspaper, the deceased family blamed Al-Wefaq, its head Ali Salman and its spiritual leader Isa Qassim for his death due to "calls for crushing", in reference to Qassim's speech in a Friday sermon in January when he said: "Whoever you see abusing a woman, crush him". Ministry of Interior did not issue any statement about the incident and Al Wasat failed to get details from the Ministry.
Maryam Nasser Abdullah	80	Sadad	9 Jun 2012	February 14 Youth Coalition said she died on Saturday as a result of complications due to inhaling tear gas fired by security forces the earlier day.
Sayed Hassan Isa	18 months	Nabih Saleh	27 Jun 2012	Nabih Saleh news network said he died due to lung tumor which developed because of inhaling large amounts of tear gas.
Husam Al Haddad	16	Muqarrah	17 Aug 2012	Died in hospital as a result of injuries sustained by security forces. Ministry of Interior said security forces were acting in defense when a group of attackers, including al-Haddad, threw several molotov cocktails at them. BCHR, however said al-Haddad was shot with shotgun. "[Al-Haddad] was kicked repeatedly by a man in civilian clothing in front of security forces", a family member said. Witnesses said al-Haddad was "soaked in blood" when a family member retrieved him. Human Rights Watch said al-Haddad was unarmed. Images said to be for al-Haddad body posted by opposition activists showed what appeared to be severe bruises and "dozens of birdshot wounds", especially to the back and right hand. Hundreds participated in the funeral held the next day which ended peacefully, according to witnesses.
Hassan Abdullah Ali Ahmed	59	Sitra	18 Sep 2012	Mohamed, son of the deceased said his father died due to health complications as a result of prolonged inhalation of tear gas. The head of the Central Governorate said the death was due to a circulatory disorder and that brother of the deceased who was present at the morgue refused an autopsy test.
Ali Hussain Ni’ma	17	Sadad	29 Sep 2012	Ni’ma died after getting injured by security forces at night. Ministry of Interior said police acted in self-defense when their patrol was attacked with fire bombs and iron rods in what it described as a "terror act". Al Wefaq opposition party on the other hand accused security forces of attacking a peaceful protest with birdshot.
Mohammed Mushaima	22	Al Daih	2 Oct 2012	According to the Ministry of Interior, Mushaima was pronounced dead in Manama on 2 October as a result of complications from sickle-cell anemia. He had been hospitalized in Salmaniya Hospital since August 2011 and his lawyers say they had asked the Bahraini courts to release Mushaima because of his bad health, but the courts had rejected the request.
Huda Sayed Neama Sayed Hassan	11 months	Bu Quwa	16 Oct 2012	According to Ahlul Bayt News Agency, she died after getting suffocated by tear gas.
Mahdi Ali Al Marhoon	60	Ma'ameer	17 Oct 2012	Marhoon died in a hospital months after he was subjected to intense suffocation from tear gas fired by police.
Imran Ahmed Mohammed	19	Pakistan	19 Oct 2012	According to the Ministry of Interior, he was killed by a homemade bomb in the village of Eker. The government released a video of the alleged bombing. Two days later, the Minister of the Interior stated that the policeman had been killed by shrapnel from an iron rod launched from a distance of 100 meters.
Ghulam Mustafa Faiz Ahmed	24	Pakistan	25 Oct 2012	Suffered burn injuries during a firebomb attack in Karzakan in April 2012.
Assiya Hassan Al Madeh	43	Jidhafs	4 Nov 2012	Died from suffocation after inhaling tear gas fired by police.
Shajib Mian Shukur Mian	33	Bangladesh	5 Nov 2012	Died of injuries from explosives devices in Gudaibiya.
Thirunavukkarasu Murugaiiyan	29	India	5 Nov 2012	Murugaiiyan died as a result of injuries sustained from explosives devices in Gudaibiya area of Manama, after kicking an object wrapped in plastic bag which blew up. It occurred when Murugaiiyan was walking behind his brother who was on the cellphone.
Ali Abbas Radhi	16	Samaheej	9 Nov 2012	Died immediately when police chased him while he was heading to Friday Prayers in Duraz, when he ran away a speeding car hit him.
Basel Mansoor Al Qattan	44	Shakhura	19 Dec 2012	BCHR said he died due to the excessive inhalation of toxic tear gas thrown on his area.
Zainab Al Fardan	(died immediately after being born)	Karzakan	24 Dec 2012	Born dead due to excessive inhalation by her mother of toxic tear gas.
Habib Ibrahim Abdullah	88	Malkiya	12 Jan 2013	Family members of Abdullah said Abdullah's health had deteriorated after inhaling toxic lethal gasses that are used excessively by the regime forces. According to family members, both Abdullah and his grandson Ali, aged 9, were exposed to a large amount of lethal gas. The nine-year-old is suffering from side effects and now receiving treatment abroad. Abdullah died earlier in the day after inhaling poisonous teargas.
Qassim Habib Marzooq	8	Karbabad	26 Jan 2013	Marzooq died few days after he was admitted into hospital on 19 January with breathing problem attributed to tear gas fired by police at earlier clashes with protesters in the area of Karbabad.
Amina Sayed Mahdi	36	Abu Saiba	13 Feb 2013	On the eve of the second anniversary of Bahraini uprising, Mahdi died of a lung infection after spending a month in hospital. According to Jihan Kazerooni, an activist who documented Mahdi's case, she lived in the village of Abu Saiba and was often exposed to tear gas as she made her way past clashes near her home. Mahdi suffered frequent stomach pains, vomiting, difficulty breathing and would sometimes faint from exposure to the gas before even reaching her house. While Mahdi had pre-existing medical conditions that raise questions about her death, her family directly blames the police, and thousands of mourners who attended her funeral on 15 February attest to the widely held view that it was the government's vicious use of tear gas that slowly killed her.
Ali Ahmed Ibrahim Al Jazeeri	16	Al Daih	14 Feb 2013	According to Al-Wefaq, Jazeeri was directly shot with shotgun pellets from a close range during clashes on the second anniversary of the uprising.
Mohammed Asif Khan	23	Pakistan	14 Feb 2013	Chief of Public Security Tariq Hassan Al Hassan said while Asif and several other policemen were "securing roads and maintaining order" during a clashes in Sehla between demonstrators and security forces on the second anniversary of the uprising, he was targeted by protesters who shot a projectile that fatally injured him. He died on his way to hospital.
Mahmood Al Jazeeri	20	Nabih Saleh	22 Feb 2013	On the second anniversary of Bahraini uprising, Mahmood suffered a direct hit to the head from a tear gas canister fired by a member of the state security forces. Later a video reportedly depicting the incident appeared on YouTube. In it the victim can be seen bending down when a police officer, who is no more than 15 metres away, fires a tear gas canister directly at his head. On 22 February, Mahmood died in Salmaniya Medical Complex as a result of his injuries. Later that evening, the interior ministry pre-emptively distanced themselves from any potential responsibility in Mahmood's death by announcing a carefully worded investigation into the "circumstances surrounding the initial injury". Mahmood's funeral has also been the cause of tensions between the Ministry of the Interior and Al Jaziri's family. The debate centred around the fact that the family wanted to have the funeral procession in the village of Al-Daih, whereas the MOI wanted the procession to be in Nabih Saleh. The dispute lasted 12 days, and eventually the family agreed for the procession and burial to be in Nabih Saleh.
Hawra Yousif Omran	(died immediately after being born)	Nuwaidrat	18 Mar 2013	Suffer from excessive inhalation by his mother of toxic tear gas during her pregnancy.
Jaffar Jassem Al Taweel	35	Sitra	26 Mar 2013	According to his family, Jaffar died as a result of inhaling tear gas that was thrown at his house heavily which contributed to the deterioration of his health. He inhaled large amounts of tear gas on 14 March after being fired upon directly, and his health deteriorated on the same day. Two days later, his health condition was worsened and he was taken to hospital before he died.
Abdul Ghani Al Rayyes	66	Diraz	1 Apr 2013	Bahrain Centre for Human Rights (BCHR) claims he dies after reportedly hearing his son, Ahmed, screaming inside while being beaten in Budaiyah police station. He was not allowed to see Ahmed, and forced out of the police station. He fell unconscious and was moved to the International Hospital of Bahrain. The death certificate stated "dead on arrival" as the immediate cause of death without mentioning the fact that he has hypertension. Ahmed was shortly released after news of his father's death. Abdul Ghani's daughter fainted after hearing news of her father's death, and had to be moved to the hospital.
Syed Imran Hamid	31	Karzakan	28 May 2013	

== See also ==
- Human rights reports on Bahraini uprising (2011–present)
- Torture in Bahrain
- Human Rights in Bahrain
- Timeline of the Bahraini uprising (2011–present)
