= Aftermath of the Bahraini uprising (July–December 2011) =

The following is an incomplete timeline of events that followed the Bahraini uprising of 2011 from July to December 2011. This phase saw many popular protests, escalation in violence and the establishment of an independent government commission to look into the previous events.

== July 2011 ==
=== July 2 ===
Forum for reconciliation talks between Bahrain government and the Shia opposition, including Al Wefaq, begin. Talks scheduled to continue through July.

=== 8 July ===
The Iranian Foreign Ministry demanded the withdrawal of Saudi Arabian troops from Bahrain, which had still not occurred as of the time of Tehran's statement. Iran set Saudi Arabian withdrawal as a precondition for dialogue between the two rival Middle Eastern powers.

In Bahrain, Al Wefaq announced it would not participate fully in the "national dialogue" urged by King Hamad. Khalil al-Marzooq, speaking for the movement, said Al Wefaq will boycott committees to discuss economic and social issues while continuing to participate in committees on politics and human rights. Marzooq claimed, "This dialogue will not lead to a solution ... and it does not fulfill the needs to pull Bahrain out of its political crisis."

=== 13 July ===
Ayat Al-Qurmezi was suddenly released and hundreds of people gathered nearby her house in Sanad to welcome her nearby her. However, her sentence has not been revoked. Her family fear that she might be re-arrested, as she has not been pardoned and her release was not the result of an appeal against her one-year sentence. She is currently under house arrest.

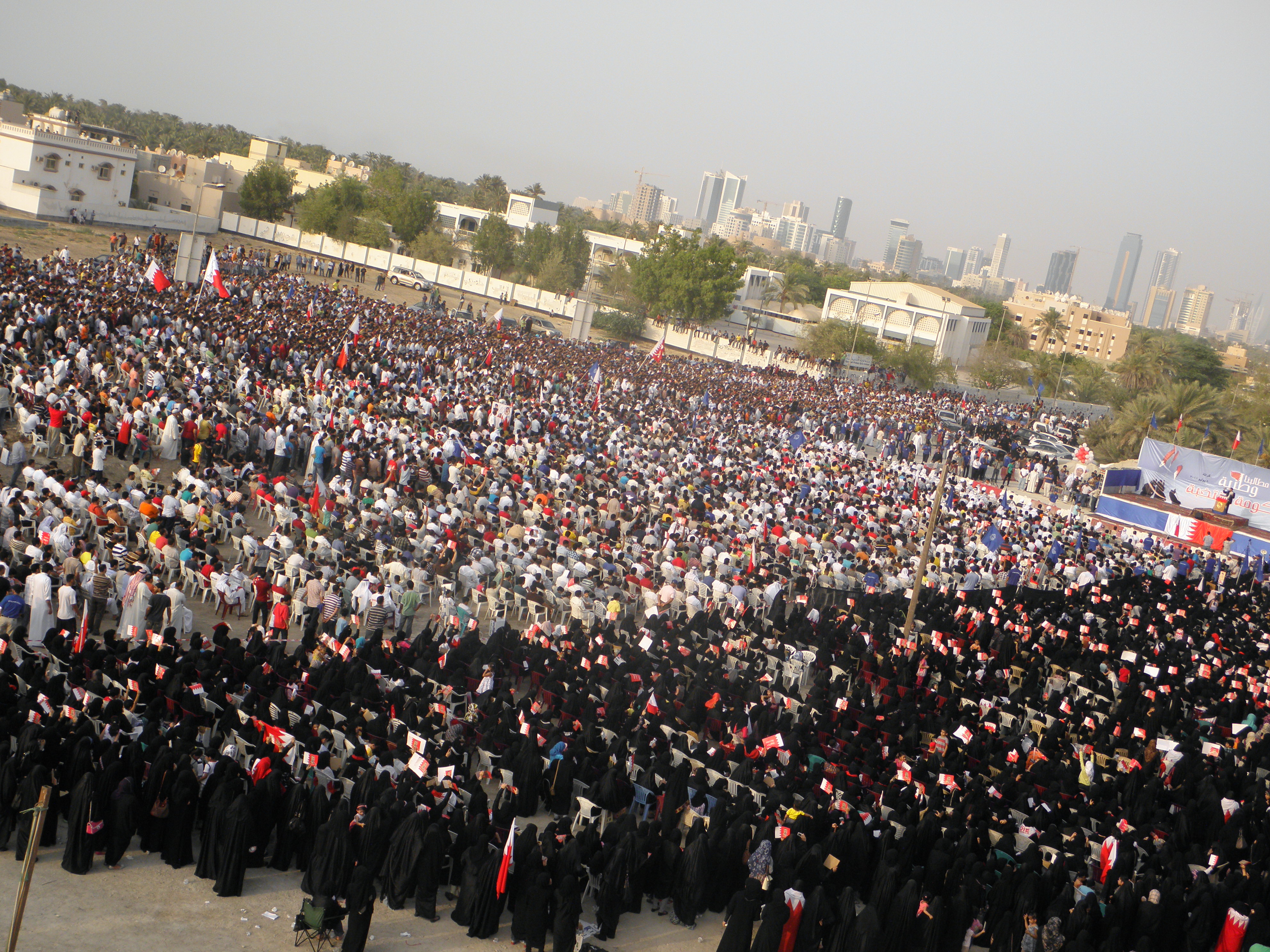
Thousands of demonstrators gather for "National demands: An elected government" rally in Karrana, Bahrain on 8 July.

=== 17 July ===
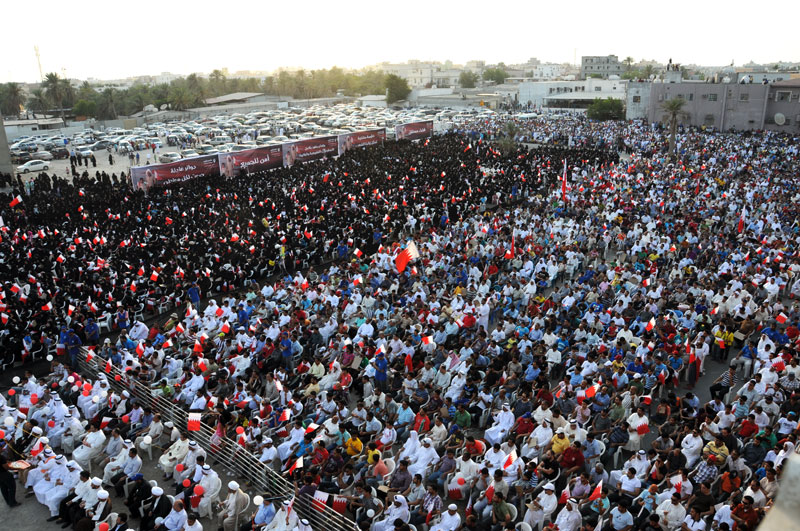
Thousands of demonstrators gather for "Sticking to our national demands" rally in Musalla, Bahrain on July, 22

Al Wefaq, which had previously declared it would only participate in half of the committees of the "National Dialogue" established by the Bahraini government, pulled out of the negotiations entirely. Party officials said seats were allocated in a way that deliberately marginalized Shi'a Muslims, allotting them 35 out of 300 seats even though Shi'a candidates were elected to nearly half of the seats up for election the previous year. The move suggested that while popular protests had been largely suppressed, the opposition movement continued to push back against the regime.

=== August 2011 ===
==== 4 August ====
Al Jazeera English released a fifty-minute documentary film about the Bahraini uprising entitled Bahrain: Shouting in the Dark, which highlights continuing anti-government protests by Bahraini Shias and shows how Facebook was used to target pro-democracy activists – "unmasking Shia traitors" – and catalogues human rights abuses by the regime.

==== 7 August ====
Bahrain protested to its neighbour Qatar about the recent Al Jazeera English documentary film on the uprising. Khamis al-Rumaihi, a Sunni MP, alleged a "hidden agenda" and accused Al Jazeera, owned by the emir of Qatar, of trying to foment unrest and undo the benefits of Bahrain's national dialogue.

Bahrain released ex-MPs Jawad Fairouz and Matar Ibrahim Matar, of the Al Wefaq opposition party.

==== 8 August ====
A Sitra-based correspondent for The Guardian reported that protests and repression in Bahrain were still ongoing, just more quietly than in the heyday of the uprising.

==== 11 August ====
Ahead of a proposed protest march to the site of the former Pearl Roundabout, tanks and police vehicles blocked roads to the site, multiple witnesses reported to the Associated Press. State-run media announced 23 Health Ministry employees in Bahrain would likely lose their jobs over their alleged role during the uprising, while 200 suspended employees would be asked to "temporarily" return to work. It was not immediately clear what the workers to be fired were accused of, or why the suspended workers were being reinstated.

==== 13 August ====
Al Wefaq announced it would boycott September's parliamentary elections, claiming that the elections would not be free and fair and arguing that lack of democratic reforms rendered the lower house of parliament functionally irrelevant, as the upper house, which is constituted by appointed legislators rather than democratically elected ones, can overrule its decisions.

==== 15 August ====
A mob of hundreds of Bahrainis stormed the office of the international Bahrain Commission of Inquiry after local news reported that the commission absolved government officials of wrongdoing over the crackdown, forcing the office's closure. The commission denied the news reports and said its investigation was ongoing.

==== 28 August ====
King Hamad announced a pardon for many protesters, saying that "we today announce that we forgive them" for "abusing us and senior officials in Bahrain". He also outlined a plan under which detainees who had proven abuse by security forces could receive financial compensation. The king said that trials of political dissidents not covered by the pardon would continue, but promised to move military trials of protesters to civil courts.

==== 30 August ====
The government announced that 20-year-old poet Ayat al-Qurmezi, who received a year in prison for using her poetry to criticise the crackdown, was one of the people pardoned by the king.

==== 31 August ====
A 14-year-old boy called Ali Jawad al-Sheikh was reportedly struck and killed by a tear gas canister while attending an anti-government demonstration in Sitra after morning prayers. Police said they were investigating how the boy died.

=== September 2011 ===
==== 1 September ====
In what was the largest demonstration in months, thousands of people in Sitra marched in the funeral of the 14-year-old boy reportedly killed by a tear-gas attack. Demonstrators held pictures of the boy and chanted, "Down, Hamad, down!" in reference to the Bahraini monarch.

==== 2 September ====
Riot police clashed with demonstrators in suburbs across Manama. Security forces reportedly raided homes and fired shots in majority Shia neighbourhoods, while demonstrators erected barricades and pelted riot police with rocks.

==== 7 September ====
Bahrain independent commission of inquiry reveals that over 100 jailed activists have been on hunger strike for nine days.

==== 21 September ====
The "Blockade Bahrain" online campaign called for drivers to block the roads into Manama with their cars on 21 September. Protesters managed to slow traffic to a crawl during rush hour but the protest was largely unsuccessful, with delays at the time not noticeably different from normal rush-hour waits.

==== 22 September ====
Addressing an opposition rally in Tubli, a village south of Manama, Sheikh Ali Salman, head of the Al Wefaq party said, "when we talk about democracy we want democracy like that of Westminster, France, and America, not the democracy of Saddam Hussein, nor the democracy of Zine El Abidine, nor the democracy of Gadhafi."

==== 23 September ====
Women confronted riot police beating a man in Sanabis on 23 September after protesters tried to return to the Pearl Roundabout.

External videos
- Mall patrons shout pro-government slogans at protesters in City Center mall on YouTube
- Mall patrons clap and cheer as riot police rush into City Center mall on YouTube
- Riot police allegedly try to trap protesters in a burning building in Sanabis after starting a fire on YouTube

The 14 February Youth Coalition planned protests on 23 and 24 September in an effort to return to the Pearl Roundabout. The protests were timed to coincide with a boycott of the 2011 Bahraini parliamentary by-electionss to replace the 18 Al Wefaq members of parliament who resigned in February. On 23 September, the Coalition announced four staging areas close to the roundabout where protesters were to assemble before attempting the return at 3 pm. One of these locations was the village of Sanabis, where hundreds of protesters left their houses at 3 pm. Police fired tear gas at protesters, who ran into houses for cover. Police allegedly entered one house and tossed a sound grenade next to a cooking gas cylinder, starting a fire, and then tried to prevent people from leaving the burning house. At least seven protesters were treated for third-degree burns according to an Al Jazeera correspondent in Sanabis.

Another staging area was the Bahrain City Center shopping mall. A group of protesters marched through the mall chanting anti-government slogans. Police arrested 55 protesters, including 38 women and 7 girls. That evening, state television broadcast images of the mall protesters, referring to them as "savages," and encouraging viewers to report information that could lead to the arrest of protesters to the Ministry of Interior via an e-mail address displayed onscreen. On social media sites, pictures emerged of women who were arrested at City Center piled on top of each other. The female detainees were reportedly prevented from eating, praying, and contacting their lawyers or families. Lawyers for the detainees visited the Public Prosecution Office, who denied the female detainees were being questioned there. However, the lawyers observed the detainees being moved between floors in the building and managed to talk to some of them. One reportedly had bruises on her face sustained during custody, and police are believed to have beaten many others. Ultimately, sixteen female and four male detainees were charged with participating in a gathering for the purpose of disrupting public order with violence, attacking four policewomen, and publicly inciting hatred against the regime. Two women and two men were acquitted, and the remaining defendants were each sentenced to 6 months imprisonment on 20 October. One of the defendants, a 17-year-old girl suffering from sickle-cell disease was reportedly arrested from her hospital bed to begin her 6-month sentence. The verdicts and punishments were all upheld on appeal on 24 November.

Throughout the day on 23 September, the Ministry of Interior said that five police officers were injured, including one who sustained second-degree burns from a firebomb.

==== 25 September ====
Bahrain held by-elections on 25 September to fill the 18 parliamentary seats left vacant when deputies from the main opposition Al Wefaq party resigned in March 2011. Four seats were won unopposed before votes were cast. The elections were notable as two female candidates became the first two women in Bahrain to win contested parliamentary seats. The elections were boycotted by the Al Wefaq party and other opposition groups. Turnout was recorded at 17.4 percent for the 14 contested districts. The government blamed voter intimidation for low turnout.

==== 26 September ====
A Bahraini court jailed six men for fifteen years convicted of chopping off the tongue of an Asian muezzin in April 2011. Two others were jailed for ten years in the case. Many Asians complained of attacks by alleged members of the Shiite-community who accuse the Al-Khalifa Sunni ruling-family of naturalising Asian Sunnis to tip the demographic balance in the country.

Mohammed and Ali Mirza of Bahrain's national handball team were jailed for 15 years after being charged with taking part in anti-government protests. Their father said his sons were found guilty of being part of a group of anti-government demonstrators that burned down a farm owned by a member of the ruling family. A military court closed to the public also found the brothers guilty of possessing weapons and stealing money. The Mirza brothers, who played at the handball world championship in January, were among 150 Shiite athletes, coaches and referees detained as part of a crackdown on protesters. Many of them took part in marches organized by athletes in support of the demonstrations.

==== 29 September ====
A Bahraini security court sentenced twenty medical professionals to jail terms ranging from 5–15 years, claiming that they had used the Salmaniya Medical Complex as a base for antigovernment activity. The sentences were immediately condemned by human rights groups including Physicians for Human Rights.

=== October 2011 ===
==== 1 October ====
Voters cast ballots in the second round of the by-elections on 1 October. The elections passed without incident.

==== 3 October ====
A court in Bahrain jailed 14 people for up to 25 years each for the killing of a Pakistani man during the unrest. The prosecutor in the case stated that the court found them guilty of beating the man to death "with a terrorist aim".

==== 4 October ====
Liam Fox, the UK's Secretary of State for Defence at the time, warned in his speech at the Tory Party conference that Bahrain was in danger of being the “Berlin of the Middle East”. He warned that the country represented a potential flashpoint for regional conflict and suggested that a coordinated, measured process of reform would be the most beneficial way of resolving the current troubles.

==== 5 October ====
On 5 October the Bahraini Attorney General ordered the 20 doctors sentenced to prison on 29 September for “inciting hatred for the regime” and hoarding weapons in the Salmaniya Medical Complex to have their cases re-tried in civilian courts. The decision was apparently a tactical retreat in face of the international community's condemnation of the sentences, which had drawn criticism from United Nations Secretary-General Ban Ki-moon as well as organizations such as Physicians for Human Rights.

==== 6 October ====
Ahmed Jaber, a 16-year-old Bahraini teenager died in a hospital after reportedly being hit in chest, abdomen and upper limb by bird pellet gunshots fired by Bahraini security forces. According to the Interior Ministry, the boy was killed by bird-pellet shot fired following a gathering of 20 people in Abu Saiba who were blocking roads, setting bins on fire and threw Molotov cocktails at security forces when police men intervened to disperse them as authorized. Opposition groups said Jaber was hit by police birdshot and a pellet entered his heart or lungs".

==== 7 October ====
External videos
- Ahmed Jaber al-Qattan funeral on YouTube

Ahmed Jaber's funeral, who had been killed the day before was held afternoon on 7 October. Security forces sat up roadblocks to prevent people from attending the funeral, yet thousands of people attended the funeral which is thought to be one of the largest in months. At least 10,000 people joined the funeral march for Qattan through the villages of Shakoora, Janusan and Karrana, many carrying the red and white flags of Bahrain and chanting, "We will redeem you, Bahrain" and "Down with Hamad," a reference to King Hamad bin Isa al-Khalifa, whose family has ruled the island monarchy for nearly 200 years. Qattan was to be buried in Shakoora, his home town.

After the funeral hundreds of mourners marched towards Burgerland roundabout where police forces were present heavily. Security forces opened fire with tear gas, sound grenades and rubber bullets, injuring at least 11 protesters, activists said. A few people in the crowd threw stones at the authorities. More injuries were expected, though the chaotic scene around a makeshift clinic near the clashes made it impossible to verify the number, Al Jazeera's reporter in Bahrain said. Al Jazeera correspondent witnessed three men bearing bleeding wounds thought to have been caused by rubber bullets, while another man had suffered a severe facial injury after being hit by a sound grenade. by night calm had been restored to the capital. Ministry of Interior said "A group of vandals blocked Budaiya road after funeral of Ahmed Jaber, which led to interference of security forces to bring situation to normal".

==== 10 October ====
King Hamad reopened Parliament on 10 October. The new parliament included three new female members elected in the by-elections following al-Wefaq's withdrawal from official political participation after the unrest. The king praised the increasing role of women in public life.

On 10 October, 3 days after Ahmed's funeral, where the final mourning rituals were supposed to be held in Shakoora, security forces blocked all the roads leading to Shakoora to prevent people from participating in the mourning rituals. Al Jazeera reported that security forces fired tear gas and rubber bullets on tens of protesters who were trying to start a demonstration after the end of mourning rituals and that some protesters were arrested.

==== 11 October ====
The Bahrain High Criminal Court fined Mansoor Al-Jamri and three other editors of the independent newspaper Al Wasat, who were accused of publishing fabricated stories between 25 and 29 March. Each was ordered to pay a fine of 1000 dinars ($2652). Prosecutors accused Al-Jamri of inciting fellow Shiites to rise up against the government by publishing fake stories. Al-Jamri said that the fake stories were planted, and published inadvertently.

==== 13 October ====
A group of opposition political societies including Al Wefaq published a document, the Manama Paper, in which they renewed their calls for political reform. The document states the opposition's intention to continue with popular protests as a way of reaching their goals. The document also calls for a dialogue between the authorities and opposition on the basis of seven principles outlined by the Crown Prince in a 13 March 2011 offer of dialogue. The offer was reportedly rejected on 13 March 2011 by Al Wefaq, who instead preferred to see a new constitution drawn up by an elected assembly.

==== 16 October ====
Protesters held a demonstration in the northern village of Al Dair, calling for the release of hundreds of prisoners.

==== 20 October ====
The Bahrain Independent Commission of Inquiry asked the king on 20 October to allow a month-long delay in the publication of its report. Publication of the report is now expected on 23 November. The BICI claimed that they have an extremely large amount of evidence to examine and therefore need more time.

==== 23 October ====
The retrial of the 20 medical professionals sentenced to jail terms of 5–15 years began in civilian court. The retrial was ordered after international medical community criticized the sentences from the Bahraini security court.

=== November 2011 ===
==== 19 November ====
Hundreds of protesters held a funeral for a young protester killed by a police vehicle. They rallied near a United States naval base before being dispersed by security forces.

==== 23 November ====
The Bahrain Independent Commission of Inquiry's report was released (see full report on the govactions website). The report confirmed the Bahraini government's use of torture and other forms of physical and psychological abuse on detainees.

The report has been criticized for not disclosing the names of individual perpetrators of abuses and extending accountability only to those who actively carried out human rights violations.

=== December 2011 ===
==== 2 December ====
Al Jazeera English published a lengthy feature by Matthew Cassel, reporting from the restive Shi'a-majority village of Sanabis. According to the report, the uprising in Sanabis and many other villages near the capital of Manama was still going strong as of early December 2011, with the largest public protests since the lifting of the emergency law taking place after the Peninsula Shield Force withdrew the previous weekend. Cassel characterised the protesters as overwhelmingly peaceful, following the advice of anti-violence activists, but increasingly despairing of the prospects of effecting governmental changes without taking up arms. Cassel's report included photographs of Bahraini activists marching in the streets, carrying homemade riot shields, waving the national flag, fleeing from security forces, and having injuries treated in home clinics.

==== 3 December ====
Clashes erupted between the Bahraini security forces and people attending a religious procession in Muharraq, leading to the arrests of some men. Hundreds of Shiites took part in the procession ahead of the religious festival of Ashoora in Muharraq in northern Bahrain.

==== 23 December ====
Bahraini security forces attack the headquarters of al-Wefaq and use tear gas on protesters in Manama. Clerics also insist that the government is targeting protesters because they are attempting to divide the protest movement, which is made up of both Sunnis and Shias.

==== 30 December ====
On 30 December, amateur video was posted to YouTube that appeared to show individuals throwing Molotov cocktails at policemen in Nuwaidrat.

==== 31 December ====
External videos
- Video purporting to show the discovery of Hashim's body on YouTube

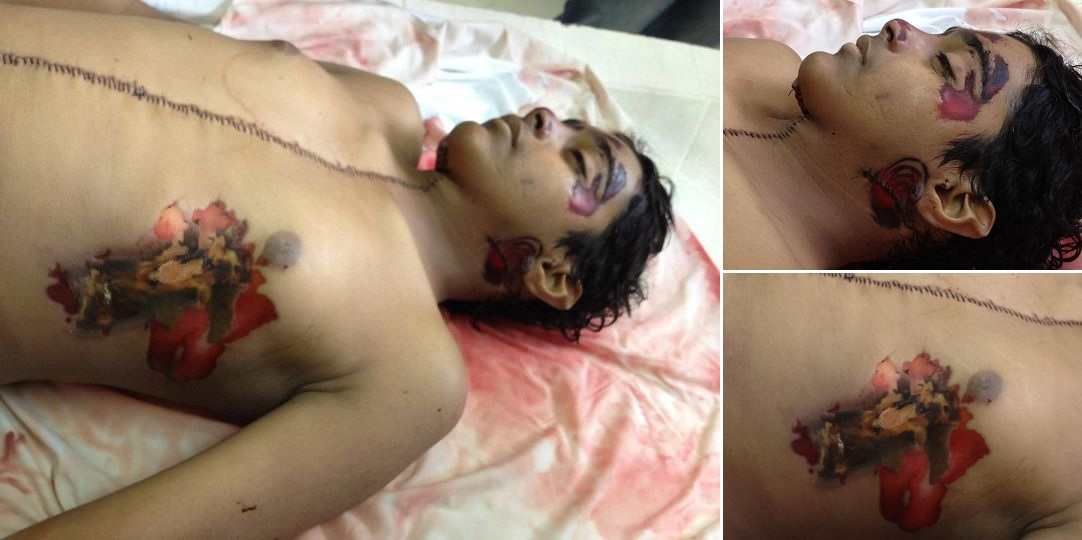
Sayed Hashim's body at the bather

During protests on the island of Sitra on New Year's Eve against the government, a 15-year-old boy named Sayed Hashim Saeed died after police allegedly fired two tear gas canisters at his chest and neck from close range. A medical report gave the cause of death as hematomas and bleeding as a result of a neck injury, and noted burns on the bottom-left of his chest and his left forearm. The government released a statement claiming that the burns on Sayed's body were inconsistent with burns caused by a tear gas canister. The statement also said preliminary investigations showed that Hashim participated in attacks on security forces with molotov cocktails that took place throughout the day, and that a full investigation was underway.

== See also ==
- Shia Crescent
