= Aftermath of the 2011 Bahraini uprising =

The aftermath of the Bahraini uprising of 2011 is contained in the following timeline articles:

- Aftermath of the Bahraini uprising (April–June 2011), a chronology from the start of April 2011 to the end of June 2011.
- Aftermath of the Bahraini uprising (July–December 2011), a chronology from the start of July 2011 to the end of December 2011.
- Aftermath of the Bahraini uprising (January–August 2012), a chronology from the start of January 2012 to the end of August 2012.
- Aftermath of the Bahraini uprising (from September 2012), a chronology from the start of September 2012 onward.

== See also ==
- Timeline of the Arab Spring
