= Al Taawon Secondary School =

Coordinates: 29.19342°N 30.75904°E

- مدرسة التعاون الثانوية للبنين
- Sanad; Bahrain

Information
- School type: Public
- Religious affiliation: Islam
- Opened: 2006
- Status: Open
- School number: 1847
- Principal: Mr. Abdulraoof Al Shehabi
- Grades: Grade 10 to Grade 12
- Gender: Male
- Age range: 15 to 18
- Average class size: 32
- Language: Arabic
- Hours in school day: From 7:30 till 2:15

Al Taawon Secondary School is an all-boys public school in Bahrain. The school teaches more than 1200 students in grades 10 to 12. It was founded in 2006.

In 2011, the school was exposed to a huge fire which caused damage to some labs.

== Facilities ==
The school is equipped with twelve computer laboratories, with other labs dedicated to physics, chemistry, biology and mathematics.

== Controversy ==
During the 2022–2023 year the school suffered from many controversies, the most major of which included the brutal beating of a teenager from Sanad by a gang of teenagers from Nuwaidrat and an incident in a bathroom where a few 10th Grade boys where caught selling soft drugs.
