= Mushaima =

Mushaima (Arabic: مشيمع) is a surname. Notable people with the surname include:

- Ahmed Mushaima, Bahraini footballer
- Ali Abdulhadi Mushaima (1989–2011), young Bahraini who Monday 14 February 2011, the "Bahraini Day of Rage", became the first fatality of the Bahraini Uprising
- Hasan Mushaima (Arabic: حسن مشيمع) is an opposition leader in Bahrain and the secretary-general of the Haq Movement
- Mohammed Mushaima (c.1988–2012), Shia Bahraini political activist
