= Ahmad Nady =

Egyptian political cartoonist, comic artist and activist

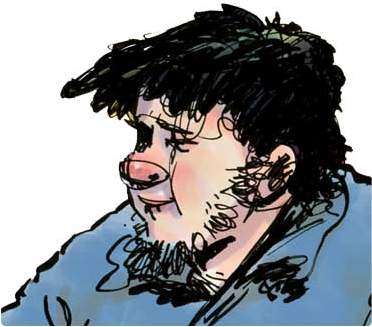
- A caricature drawing of Ahmad Nady by himself
- Born: December 31, 1981 (age 44); Cairo, Egypt
- Education: School of Fine Arts, Helwan University
- Occupations: Cartoonist, Comics artist
- Employer: Tarek Nour’s Advertising Agency
- Children: Hamza and Khadija
- Parent(s): Mohammad Nady and Iman Ezzat

Ahmad Mohammad Nady (Arabic: أحمد محمد نادي) is an Egyptian political cartoonist, comic artist and activist. Belonging to a family of artists, Nady began his career early on, steadily rising to become one of the best known comic artists in Egypt at a young age. He has drawn political cartoons since an early age, and since the Egyptian Revolution of 2011, has become increasingly active in this area of work, garnering a significant reputation for the boldness of his work.

== Biography ==
=== Background ===
Nady was born on December 31, 1981, into a family of artists. His father, Mohammad Nady, was a cartoonist and his mother, Iman Ezzat, is a sculptor and writer. In addition to his parents, Nady has cited his childhood and upbringing in the 10th of Ramadan City (Note: The "10th of Ramadan City" is like the 6th of October City.) as an early influence in becoming an artist. As a child, he was an avid reader of comic books and magazines and he would occasionally create comics about his relatives, basing his characters on their features.

Over time, this became a hobby with his father acting as mentor. He drew caricatures of schoolmates and teachers. Among his first comic characters was the "Amazing Mido" (Arabic: ميدو العجيب Mido al-'Ajeeb), a young inventor who was subjected to radiation that allowed him to easily control and change his shape and form.

According to Nady, his first published cartoon was political. The cartoon was made during the Gulf War, while Nady was in elementary school, and it portrayed Sindbad hitting Saddam Hussein on the head, saying, "You've made the children of the world hate me now that they know I'm an Iraqi." In 1992, at barely 11 years of age, he won his first award in a workshop at the Mahmoud Mukhtar Museum. The following year, he was given the best caricature award by a caricature magazine.

=== Career ===
Ahmad Nady began his professional career at the age of 14 when his father was suffering from fatigue and overwork. Nady asked him if he could draw for a Lebanese magazine and his father agreed and encouraged him. He started out at first as an assistant at a workshop producing Pharaonic sculptures, before working with a number of magazines, including Karma (Arabic: كرمة) company, known for several of its comics: Simsim's World (Arabic: عالم سمسم The Egyptian version of Sesame Street), Sameer and Alaa el-Din (Arabic: سمير علاء الدين) and the Young Arab (Arabic: العربي الصغير), among others.

During this time, Nady started mailing several comic magazine editors with samples of his work and his ideas, all of which were rejected in Egypt. One of these, among his very first professional work, was a series of adventures called Fayek w Rayek (Arabic: فايق ورايق) after its two main characters, a chimpanzee and a sloth. The series was published by the Saudi comic magazine Basme (Arabic: باسم) and was popular among children.

While steadily advancing as a comic artist, Nady began entering the realm of political cartoons. In 1996, he won third place in a UNESCO exhibition, "Where We Live", and in 2004, participated in an art exhibition organized by the Artists' Syndicate in solidarity with Palestine. He promoted comics and cartoons by setting up numerous workshops across Egypt, including at least one in the Bibliotheca Alexandrina. He has also won three awards from deviantArt, an online community of artists.

== Activism ==
Nady participated in the 2008 Egyptian general strike and, for a time, in Mohamed ElBaradei's presidential campaign.

Nady joined the 2011 revolution from the very beginning, participating politically at Tahrir Square and drawing cartoons on the spot, inviting those around him to suggest ideas and captions. He was one of the many people who camped out in Tahrir Square and was hit by a rubber bullet on January 28 during the violent clashes with the police. He also was attacked by members of the "Popular Committees" due to the propaganda by state owned media, which claimed that the protesters had a "foreign agenda".

When asked about what should be done with National Democratic Party headquarters set on fire during the 2011 revolution, Nady praised the idea of turning the headquarters into a centre that holds cultural activities, saying, "It should be a place for workshops of all artistic fields inviting all artists from all over Egypt".

== Awards and honors ==
Local recognition

- Merit certificate of Mahmoud Mukhtar Museum Workshop, 1992.
- Prize for the best caricature in caricature magazine, 1993.
- Honorable mention from the exhibition of "Egypt in my Heart", by the Republican Youth and the Ministry of Culture, 2004.
- Recognition Award from the Artists' Syndicate for his contribution to an art exhibition in solidarity with Palestine, 2004.

International recognition

- Third prize at UNESCO exhibition, "Where We Live", 1996.
- Three Daily Deviations awards from Deviant Art, 2005, 2006 and 2007.

== Gallery ==
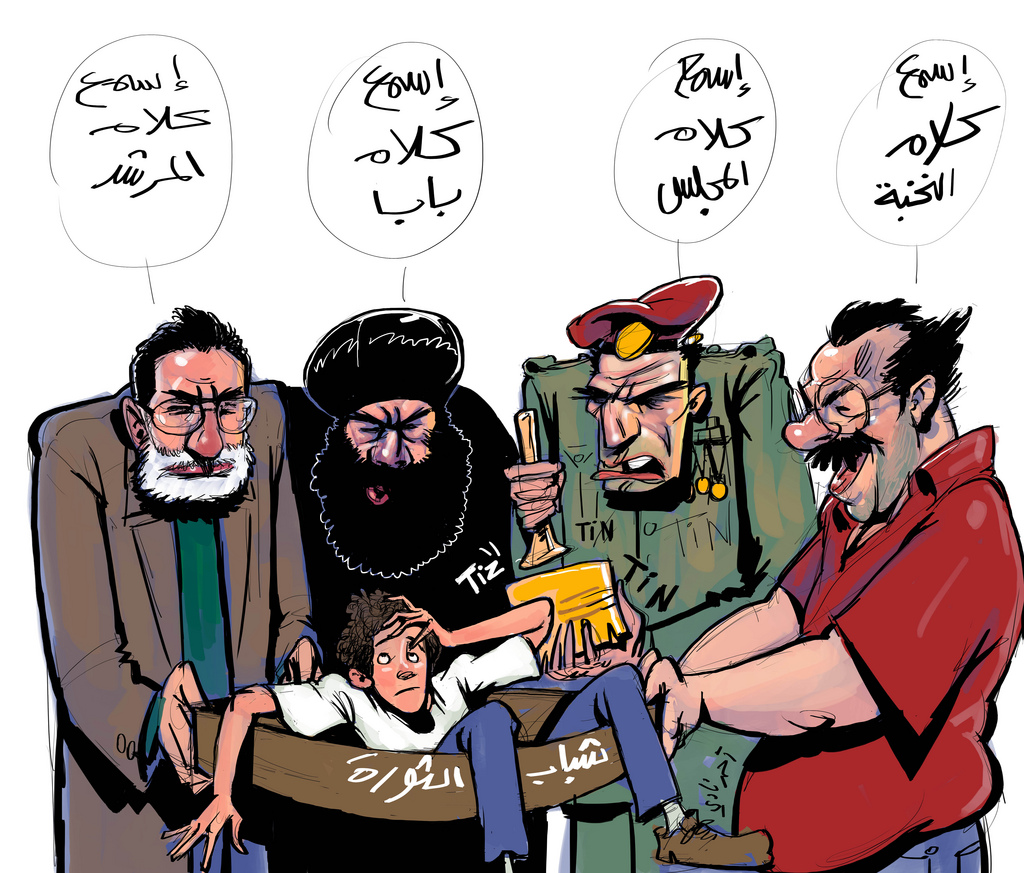
The Muslim Brotherhood, The Coptic church, Elites and the SCAF trying to control the Jan25 youth

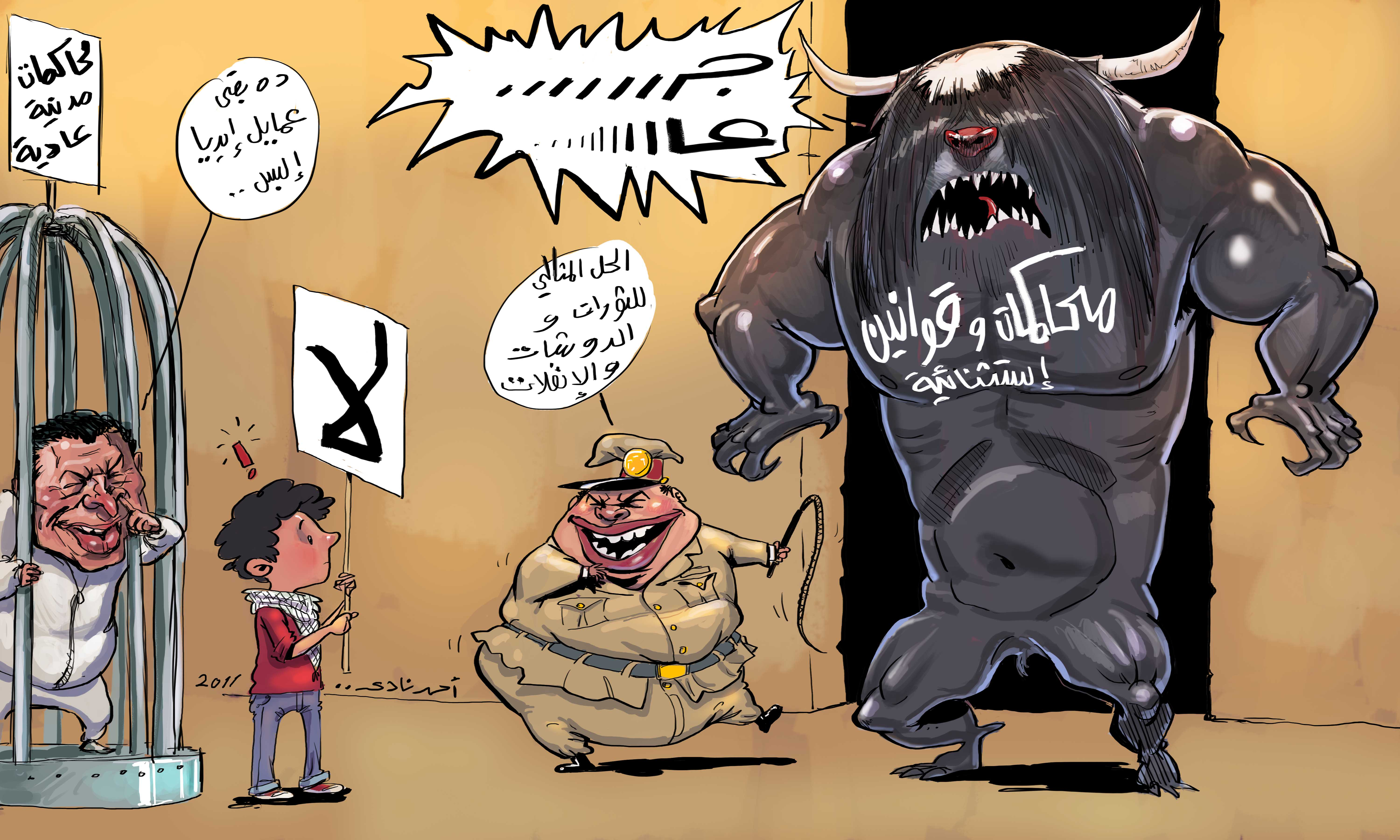
SCAF trailing peaceful protesters in Military courts while Mubarak faces a civilian court

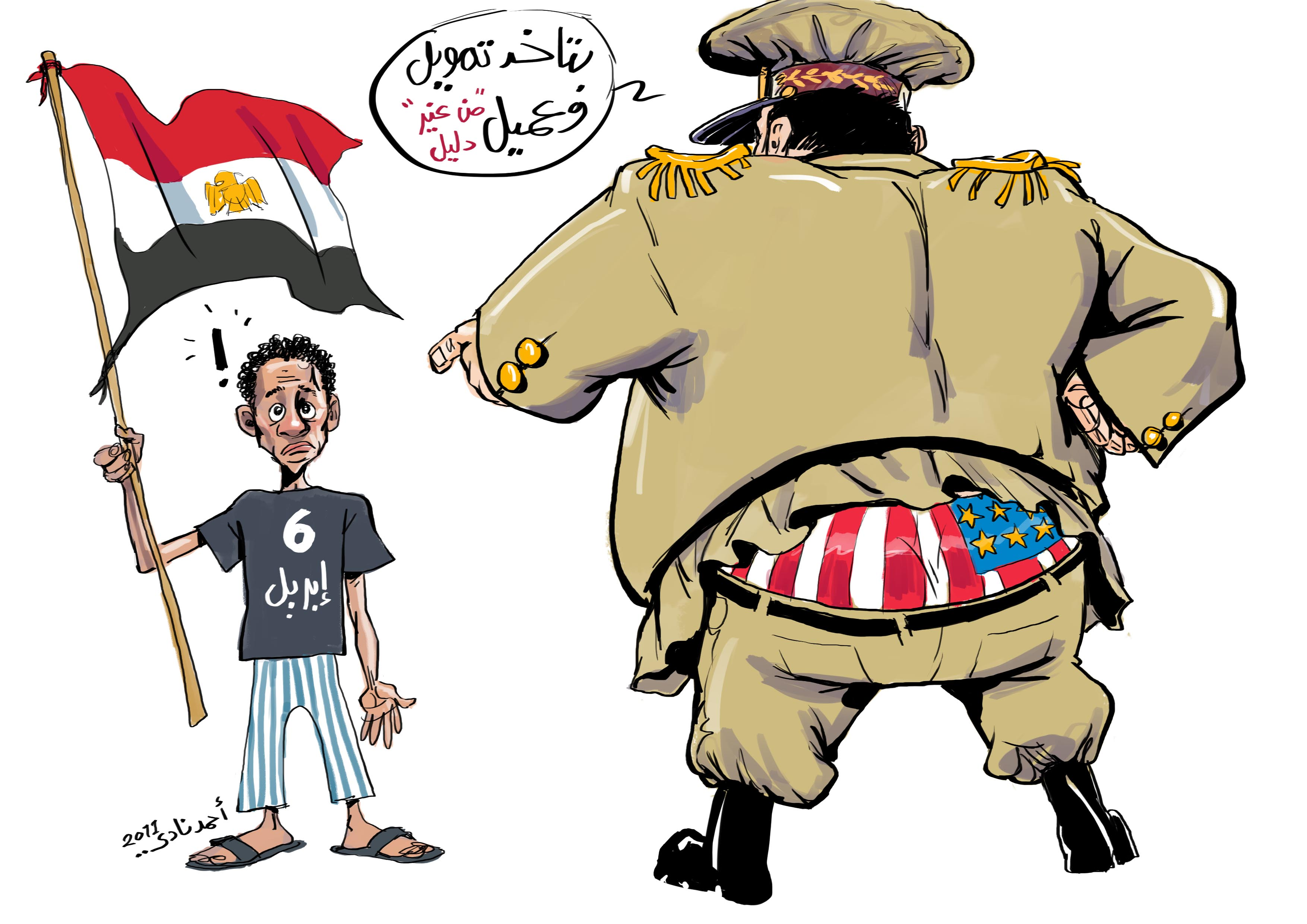
Supreme Council of the Armed Forces accusing the 6 April Youth Movement of receiving American funds

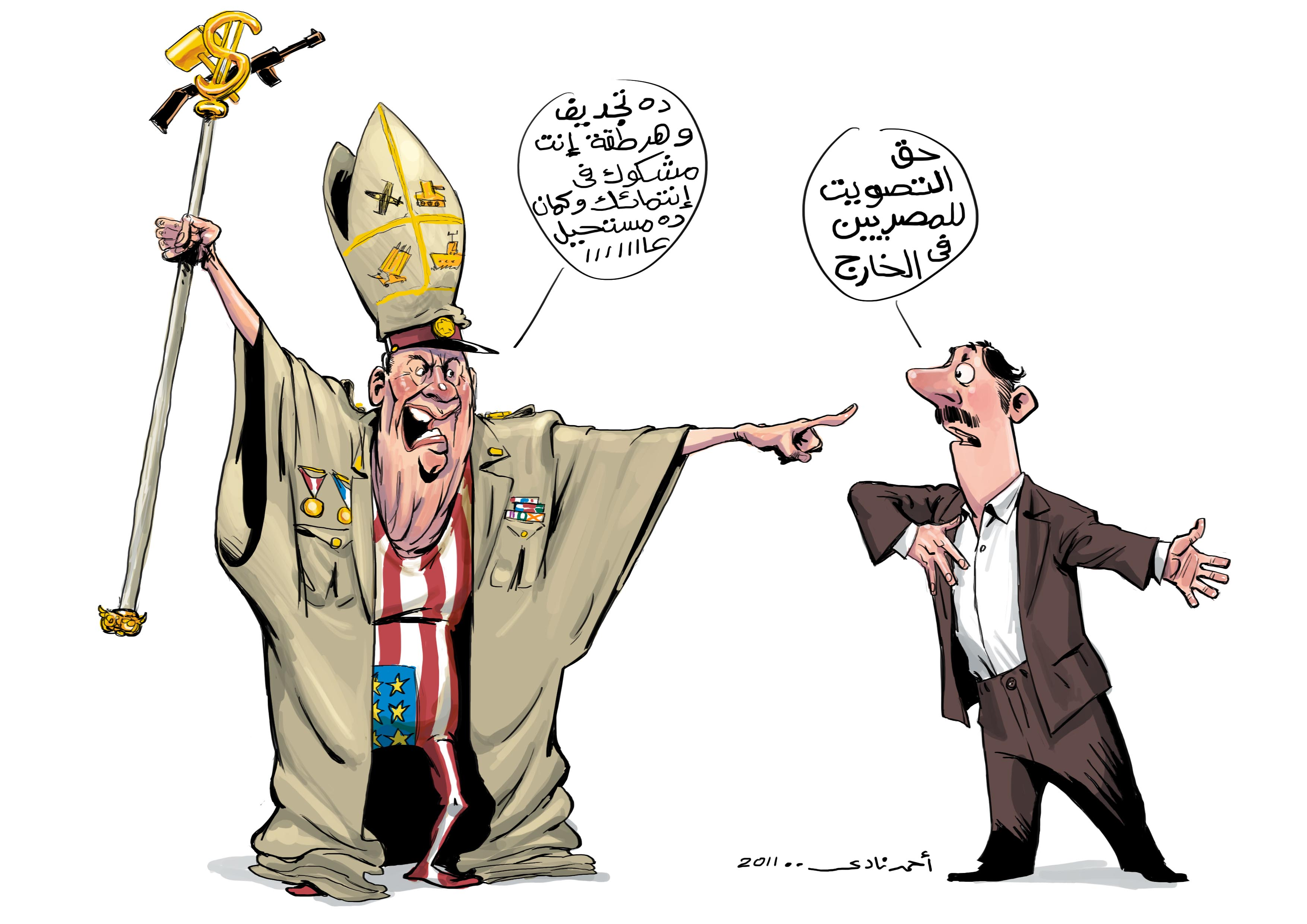
SCAF opposing the right to vote for Egyptians living abroad, claiming that Egyptians abroad are unpatriotic and have a secret agenda

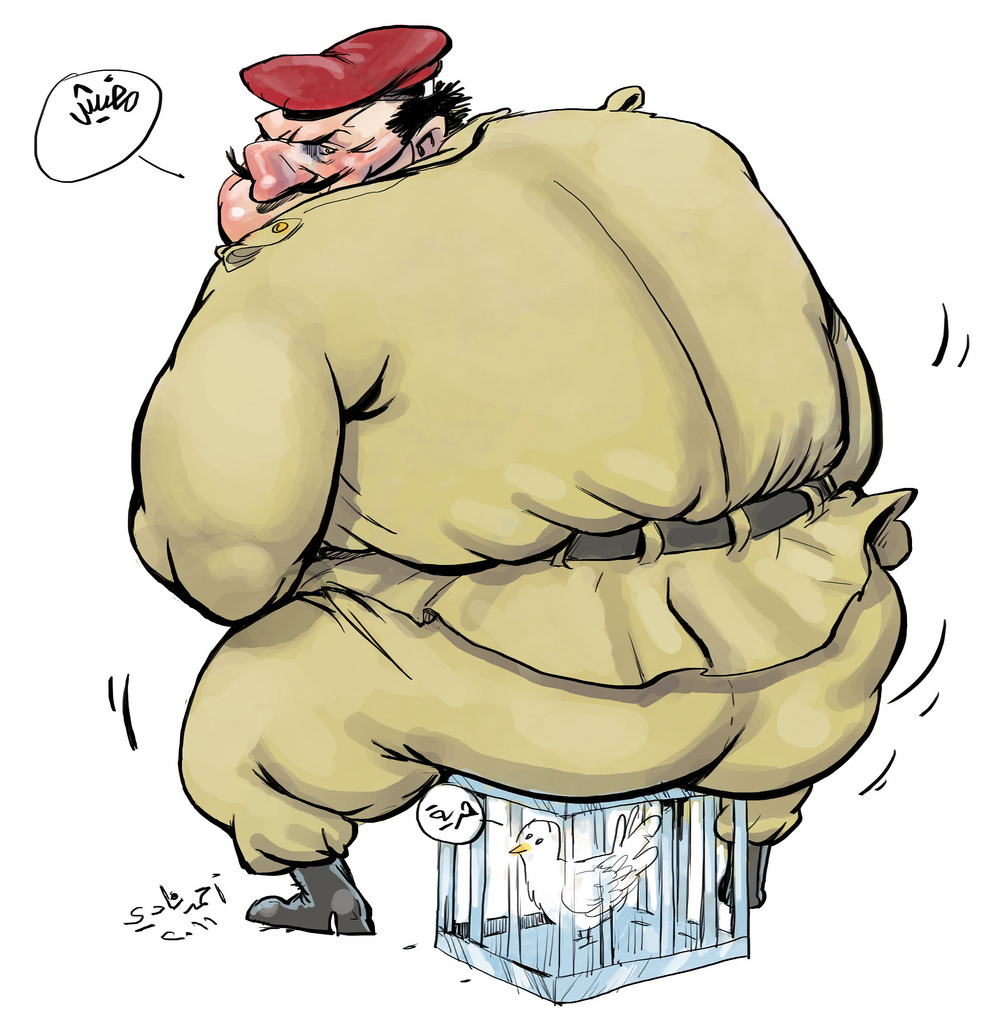
Freedom under SCAF

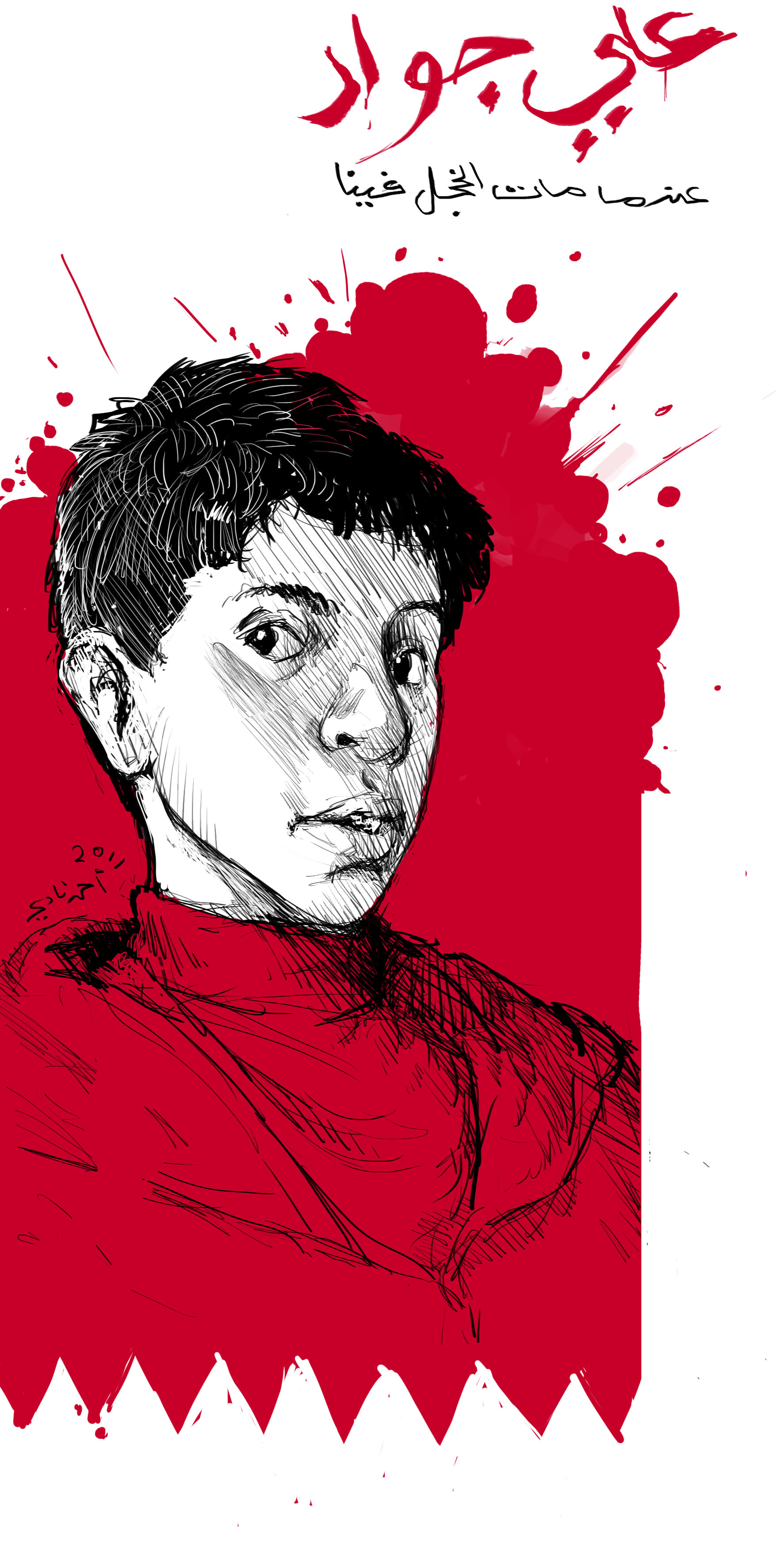
Ali Jawad al-Sheikh

== See also ==
- Carlos Latuff
