= Gulf University, Bahrain =

University in Sanad, Bahrain

Gulf University
- الجامعة الخليجية
- Motto: Learn to Lead the Future
- Type: Private University
- Established: by Professor Mona bint Rashid AlZayani, Chairperson of the Board of Trustees & Board of Directors in September 2001 (Silver Jubilee Year)
- President: Professor Mohanad Ismael AlFiras
- Location: Sanad, Bahrain
- Website: http://www.gulfuniversity.edu.bh

Gulf University (GU) (Arabic: الجامعة الخليجية) is a private university located in Sanad, Kingdom of Bahrain. Established on 17 September 2001, the university is licensed by the Higher Education Council (HEC) of Bahrain. GU is also an officially recognized testing center for international examinations such as SAT, GRE, and PMI certifications.

== History ==
Gulf University was established in 2001 as part of Bahrain’s initiative to expand private higher education and diversify academic offerings. Since its founding, the university has expanded its academic programs, introduced internationally hosted programs, and developed partnerships with academic and professional institutions.

== Campus ==
The university’s campus is located in Sanad, Bahrain, and includes lecture halls, laboratories, media production facilities, and collaborative learning spaces. The campus also supports extracurricular activities, student clubs, workshops, and institutional events.

== Academic structure ==
=== Undergraduate programs ===
==== College of Administrative and Financial Sciences ====
- Bachelor’s in Human Resources Management (Arabic and English tracks; includes CIPD Level 5)
- Bachelor’s in Accounting and Finance (English track)

==== College of Communication and Media Technologies ====
- Bachelor’s in Advertising and Digital Marketing (hosted program with the University of Northampton)
- Bachelor’s in Mass Communication
  - Digital Media
  - Digital Public Relations

==== College of Engineering ====
- Bachelor’s in Interior Design Engineering
- Bachelor’s in Electrical and Electronic Engineering (hosted program with the University of Northampton)
- Bachelor’s in Mechanical Engineering (hosted program with the University of Northampton)

==== College of Law ====
- Business Law
- Real Estate Law
- Information Technology Law

=== Postgraduate programs ===
- Master's of Law (LL.M.)
- Master’s in Human Resource Management (includes CIPD Level 7; hosted program with the University of Northampton)
- Master's of Business Administration (MBA) specializations:
  - Leadership and Strategy
  - Project Management
  - Digital Marketing
  - Digital Transformation
- Master’s in Mass Communication

== Admissions & Scholarships ==
The Registration and Admissions Unit manages applications, course registration, and academic records, and provides academic advising services.

The university offers an Academic Excellence Scholarship Scheme for undergraduate students, providing up to 50% tuition fee reduction based on academic performance.

== Global Diversity Scholarship Program ==
The Global Diversity Scholarship Program (GDSP) aims to enhance cultural diversity by attracting international students and promoting a multicultural academic environment.

== Research ==
Research activities are overseen by the university’s Research Council, which supports faculty and student research initiatives, interdisciplinary collaboration, and participation in publications and conferences.

== Partnerships ==
The university maintains partnerships with industry and professional organizations to provide internship opportunities, industry-led projects, and career development pathways.

== Student services ==
The Student Services Unit provides support including:

- Registration assistance
- Visa support for international students
- Transportation and accommodation guidance
- Student activities and clubs
- Wellness and engagement initiatives
- Alumni relations

== Career counseling ==
The Career Counseling Unit offers:

- Career guidance and mentorship
- Internship placement assistance
- CV writing and interview preparation
- Employer engagement and recruitment events

== Centers of Excellence ==
- Teaching Excellence and Technology Center (TETC)
- Community Engagement and Continuing Education Center (CECEC)
- Innovation and Entrepreneurship Center (IEC)
- Media Production Center (MPC)
- Quality Assurance and Development Center (QADC)
- Sustainability and Development Makers Center (SDMC)
- Digital Transformation Center (DTC)
