= Aftermath of the Bahraini uprising (April–June 2011) =

The following is a timeline of events that followed the Bahraini uprising of 2011 from April to June 2011. This phase included continued crackdown, lifting of the state of emergency and return of large protests.

== Timeline ==
=== April 2011 ===
==== 3–11 April ====
On 3 April, the pro-opposition Bahraini newspaper Alwasat was temporarily shut down by the Bahraini government.

On 5 April, Physicians for Human Rights reported that a number of doctors had gone missing at the Salmaniya Medical Complex in Manama following recent interrogations by security forces.

On 7 April, Doctors Without Borders released a report stating that hospitals in Bahrain were used as bait by the government to snare wounded pro-democracy protesters after security forces took over health facilities. The Bahraini government, however, denied these claims. On the same day, four players of the Bahrain national football team were suspended after being accused of lending their support to anti-government protests. A'ala Hubail and Mohamed Hubail were reported to have been arrested during a training session with the Al Ahli football club after being identified on television at a rally protesting against the Bahrain government.

On 8 April, a team of Physicians for Human Rights investigators arrived at the Salmaniya Hospital to investigate reports of the systematic targeting and abuse of medical personnel. After being informed by a spokesperson for the Ministry of Health that they were welcome to visit the hospital, the investigative team arrived to find the hospital surrounded and filled by fully armed security forces and riot police, all wearing black ski masks. After some confusion, the Physicians for Human Rights team was escorted off the hospital premises.

On 9 April, twenty masked men stormed the house of the daughter of leading Shia activist Abdulhadi Alkhawaja. During the raid, Abdulhadi Alkhawaja was seized in the middle of the night and taken away along with his two sons-in-law. Alkhawaja's daughter was also present and witnessed her father's abuse at the hands of the security forces.

On 10 April, the interior ministry reported that two Shia activists died in custody. Officials accused Nabeel Rajab of fabricating photos posted on his Twitter account of the body of Ali Isa Ibrahim Saqer, who died in detention on 9 April. The photos showed slash marks all over his back and other signs of physical abuse. A Human Rights Watch researcher saw Saqer's body just prior to his burial and said the photos were accurate. A Physicians for Human Rights investigator and forensic pathologist inspected photographs of the body and found that they depicted severe contusions that appeared to be the result of blunt force injuries. According to PBS NewsHour on 17 May 2011, "Five prison guards are being charged with Saqer's death. That's according to Bahrain's Minister of Justice Sheikh Khalid bin Ali bin Abdulla al Khalifa, one of the royal family [members]".

On 11 April, four CNN reporters were arrested by Bahraini security forces in the village of Bani Jamra for filming in unrestricted areas; they were later released.

==== 12 April ====
One Bahraini national and two Iranian nationals were accused by the Bahraini High Court of providing military and economic information to the Iranian Revolutionary Guards between 2002 and April 2010, with "the intention of harming the national interests of the country". The court adjourned the case until 20 April.

Iranian member of parliament Ruhollah Hosseinian said that the Islamic Republic should dispatch its military forces to Bahrain.

The Associated Press reported that Zainab al-Khawaja, the daughter of prominent activist Abdulhadi Alkhawaja, announced on her blog, as well as on Twitter, in a letter addressed to US President Barack Obama that she would not eat until her father is released, along with her husband, brother-in-law and uncle. She ended her fast on 20 April 2011.

The release of eighty-six prisoners and suspension of more teachers and doctors was reported by the Bahraini newspaper Alwasat.

==== 13 – 18 April ====
On 13 April, a group of University of Bahrain students began to protest in response to events at the BFH. The university announced that due to recent events it was going to cease academic operations in Sakhir and Isa Town until further notice, not resuming courses until 15 May.

On 15 April, the Ministry of Justice announced it would move to ban Al Wefaq and the Islamic Action Society, but after strong criticism by the US government and others, the Foreign Minister denied that the government had any plans to dissolve either political parties and claimed that "the news were inaccurate".

On 15 April, The News International, a Pakistani newspaper, reported that Iranian Foreign Ministry had warned Pakistan of serious ramifications if the recruitment of thousands of Sunni Pakistanis in the Bahraini security forces did not stop. Nevertheless, the Pakistani Army, which provides the recruitment of retired military personnel has ignored the Iranian warning as the recruitment process continued. The newspaper further reported that the Iranian media predicted a prominent role for Pakistan in the Middle East, accusing Pakistan of "collaborating with the Sunni rulers of Bahrain to crush a pro-democracy movement".

In the early hours of 18 April, unknown assailants lobbed teargas grenades into the home of Nabeel Rajab, president of BCHR in the village of Bani Jamra. Tear gas penetrated into the adjacent home of Rajab's 78-year-old mother who suffers from respiratory disease, causing her great distress. To Human Rights Watch's knowledge, only Bahrain's security forces have access to the types of grenades thrown into the Rajab family's compound.

==== 21 April ====
Several reports have documented a systematic military abuse against medical staff.

On 21 April, emails by a senior surgeon from the Salmaniya Medical Complex were published by The Independent, adding more details on the disappearance of medical staff reported on 5 April. The surgeon, before disappearing wrote on 8 April: "Three weeks of hell. The military took control of the Salmaniya Hospital. Doctors, nurses, paramedics and patients treated as suspects by soldiers and policemen. Daily interrogation and detention to some of our colleges [...] so many of our consultant surgeon and physician colleges been arrested at pre-dawn raids and disappear. Not only doctors, nurses paramedics, football players, university academics, dean of colleges... everybody is a suspect not sure but very much intimidated and frighten." UK medics have stated that Bahrain is violating the Geneva Convention.

==== 28 April ====
On 28 April, seven Shiite protesters Ali Abdullah Hassan Alsingace (incorrectly pronounced Al Singees, Qasim Hasan Matar Ahmad, Saeed Abduljalil Saeed, Abdulaziz Abdulridha Ibrahim Husain, Isa Abdullah Kadhem Ali, Sayyed Sadiq Ali Mahdi and Husain Jaafar Abdulkareem were convicted in a military court for the killing of two police officers Kashef Ahmed Mandhoor and Mohammed Farooq Abdulsamad Al Balooshi during the operation to evict protesters from the Pearl Roundabout on 16 March. The first four defendants were sentenced to death, while the remaining three were sentenced to life imprisonment.

=== May 2011 ===
==== 17–18 May ====
According to a police statement about a crackdown on a crowd of anti-government protesters in the village of Nuwaidrat on 17 May, one protestor was injured in the head followed by the injury of nine policemen deliberately hit by a car. After one of the protesters was injured in the head, his brother got into his car and drove at full speed into the policemen. Of the nine policemen, four were injured seriously and five were wounded less seriously. The police stated that the driver was injured. Other sources claim that there was a fight between police men and that they fired bird-shots on each other.

==== 21–23 May ====
For the second time, human rights activist Nabeel Rajab's house was attacked by unknown assailants in the early hours of 21 May. Four gas grenades were fired at the house at 3:30 am Saturday in the village of Bani Jamra, Bahrain, and two broke through the windows in quarters occupied by his brother, Nader, and his family. Human Rights Watch noted that the grenades were manufactured in the United States and were of a type to which only the Bahrain Defense Authorities had access. Now it appears the Bahraini government has found a new supplier. Rajab said: "This time, the grenades were of a smaller dimension than in mid-April, and there were no markings of manufacture."

On 22 May, the appeal military court (Appeal National Safety Court) changed the death penalty (originally at 28 April) for protesters Ali Qassim Hassan Mattar Ahmed and Sa'eed Abduljaleel Saeed to life imprisonment while confirming it for Ali Abdulla Hassan Alsingace and Abdulaziz Abdulredha Ibrahim Hussain.

On 23 May, Nabeel Rajab claimed that his 65-year-old uncle, Mohammad Hassan Mohammad Jawad was arrested and is currently being tortured, due to his relation to Rajab.

==== 29–31 May ====
On 29 May, Nabeel Rajab was prevented from traveling to Beirut to attend an IFEX meeting by airport security forces. In reaction, Nabeel Rajab protested briefly outside airport.

On 31 May, Hamad Al Khalifa, King of Bahrain asked for dialogue without preconditions to begin early July of this year. He was quoted saying:

We instruct both the executive and legislative branches to call for a dialogue. Comprehensive, serious dialogue – without preconditions – to begin early July of this year. Recommendations of the dialogue are to be submitted to us and be presented to the constitutional institutions.

The same day, the military court (of Bahrain Defence Force) issued an order for Nabeel Rajab president of Bahrain Centre for Human Rights, Ali Salman head of Al Wefaq, Bahrain's biggest political party and 3 of Al Wefaq's resigned MPs: head of the block Abdul-Jalil Khalil, former vice president of lower parliament room Khalil Al-Marzooq and former vice president of legalization committee Mohammed Al-Mizaal. The order accused Nabeel Rajab for spreading false news and statements about the situation in Bahrain and promoting to hate and disrespect a specific sect. He was also accused to humiliating king of Bahrain. All of them were released on the same day.

=== June 2011 ===
==== 1 June ====
Several clashes broke out between protestors and security forces across Shia populated areas of Bahrain the day the kingdom officially lifted its state of martial law.

Security forces fired tear gas and shotguns on groups of flag-waving protesters who marched in the streets of Duraz on the outskirts of the capital Manama.

==== 3 June ====
Demonstrators marching in Sanabas adjacent to the destroyed Pearl Roundabout demanded more rights for Shia Bahrainis. They were dispersed by police firing tear gas and rubber bullets. Another protest at Bab al-Bahrain after the funeral of a demonstrator injured in March was thwarted by security forces, though no shots were reportedly fired in that confrontation.

==== 8 June ====
Formula 1 boss Bernie Ecclestone says October's reinstated Bahrain Grand Prix is canceled this year as the Persian Gulf nation continues to grapple with reports of human rights violations a week after the king lifted martial law imposed to quell the uprising.

==== 11 June ====
Thousands of Bahrainis attended a rally under the name A Homeland for all (Arabic:وطن الجميع) for political reform. The protest was announced in advance but did not receive government permission, opposition supporters said. It was held in the Shi'ite district of Saar, west of the capital. Police did not stop up to 10,000 people who came to the rally, many in cars, said a Reuters witness. Helicopters flew over protesters raising signs that read "The nation is for everyone." Sheik Ali Salman, head of the Shiite political party Wefaq, gave a speech:

We salute every mother who lived through the fear of having the door of her home kicked in by security forces or her children taken away. We salute every father who participated in the peaceful rallies, We have lived through black months.

U.S. State Department annual report shows sales of U.S. companies of weapons to Bahrain last year amounted to $112 million, while the exports of 2009 at $88 million. Although transactions involved the sale of military electronics and aircraft, there were contracts for the export of shotguns, pistols, and assault weapons; thus raising the possibility that U.S. weapons were used to suppress the protests and raising questions in Congress that led the ministry to review the permits for exporting weapons to countries in the Middle East.

==== 12 June ====
Ayat Al-Qurmezi was sentenced to one year in prison by the National Safety Court.

==== 13 June ====
On 13 June, the Bahraini government commenced the trials of 47 medical professionals, including some of the country's leading surgeons. Among the defendants of the trial, 24 were doctors and 23 others were either nurses or paramedics. Many of them had worked at the Salmaniya medical complex in Manama, which the prosecutors claimed to have been a coordination point of the uprising where automatic weapons and ammunition had been allegedly hidden. The prosecutors also claimed that they seized the medical complex and detained those inside who disagreed with the opposition. The defendants' lawyers and international human rights activists claimed that the defendants were tortured to extract false confessions. One of the defendants tried to tell the judge that his confession had been extracted under torture, but the judge told him to stop and wait for the due process. Twenty of the defendants pleaded not guilty to charges ranging from stealing medicines to stockpiling weapons.

==== 22 June ====
On 22 June, The Bahraini government sentenced ten pro-democracy activists to life in prison for their role in the uprising.

==== 29 June ====
External videos
- Hamad Bin Isa Speech on BTV – 29 June on YouTube

The New York Times reported that Saudi Arabia had announced "most" of its troops would leave Bahrain by 4 July 2011.

The Royal Independent Investigation Commission was established by the King to examine the events of the preceding months.
