= Bahiya Al Aradi =

- Born: Bahrain
- Died: 21 March 2011 (age 51); Manama, Bahrain
- Cause of death: bird pellet gunshots
- Known for: being the first woman killed in the Bahraini uprising (2011–present)

Bahiya Al Aradi (Arabic: بهیة العرادی) (? – 16 March 2011) was the first woman killed in the Bahraini Uprising. She has been called a shaheeda, or female martyr, by her family.

On March 16, the government allowed her brother to visit her for a few minutes in Bahrain Defense Force Hospital (Bahrain Royal Medical Services).

She died in hospital from injuries she received when she was hit in the back by birdshot pellets fired from a range of 50 to 75 meters. On March 20, the hospital announced that she had died of her injuries. At least one bullet had entered al-Aradi's head from behind. There was no exit wound.

== Personal life ==
Al Aradi was never married.

== See also ==
- Death of Fadhel Al-Matrook
- Bloody Thursday
- Death of Ahmed Jaber al-Qattan
