= Jurdab =

Coordinates: 26°10′N 50°35′E

Jurdab جرداب
- Village
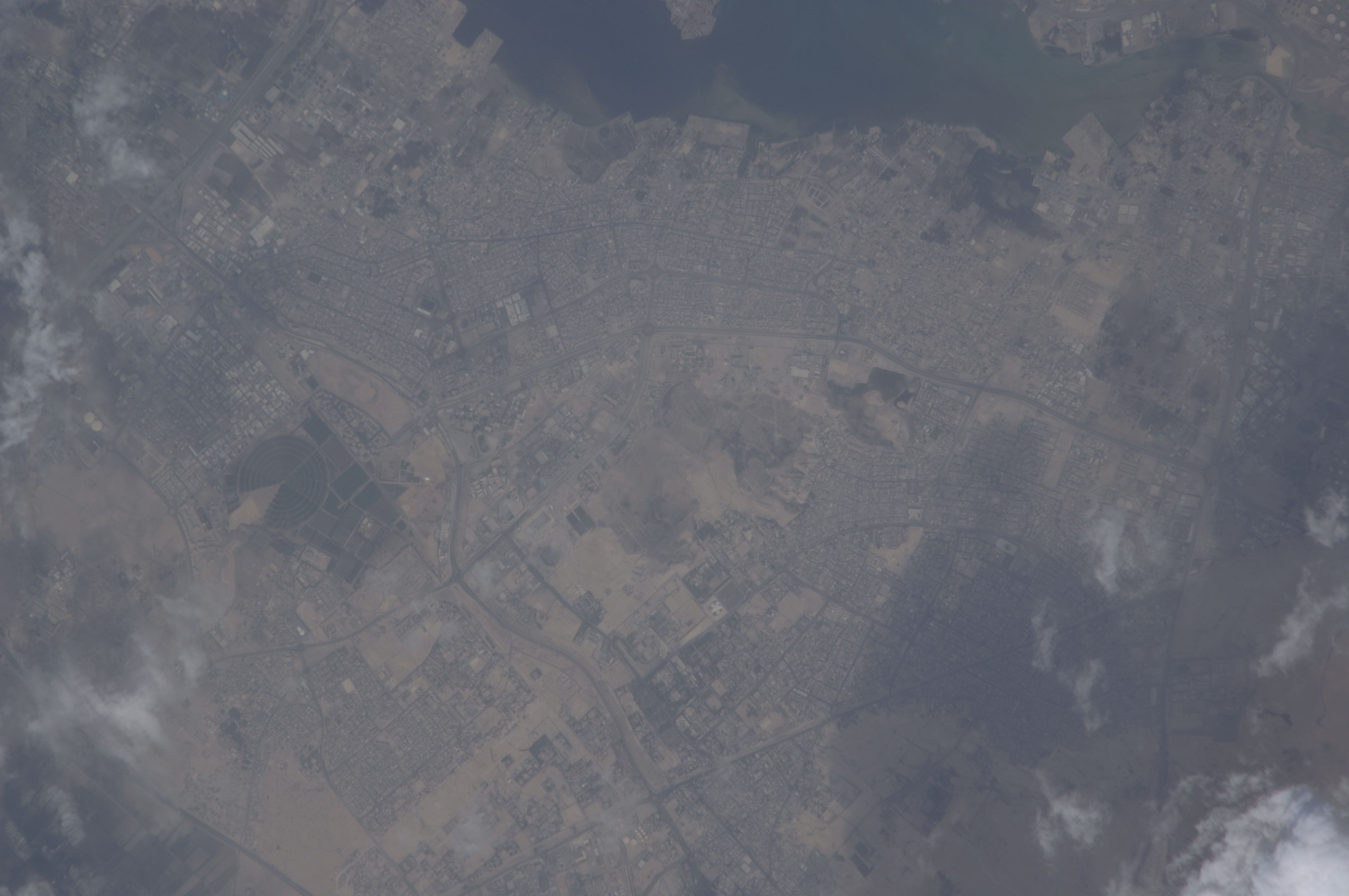

- Location within Bahrain
- Country: Bahrain
- Governorate: Governorate

Jurdab (Arabic: جرداب) is a village located in the Kingdom of Bahrain. It neighbors the villages of Jid Ali and Sanad and the 9th area in Isa Town, to the south of the capital Manama.

== Etymology ==
The name Jurdab is believed to have originated from the Persian word گرداب (Ger-dab) meaning whirlpool.

== History ==
In J. G. Lorimer's Gazetteer of the Persian Gulf (1908), he writes that Jurdab consisted of 30 reed huts inhabited by the Baharna, whom were date palm cultivators. There were an estimated 2,230 date palms in the village.
