= Ayat Al-Qurmezi =

Bahrani activist and poet

- آيات حسن محمد القرمزي
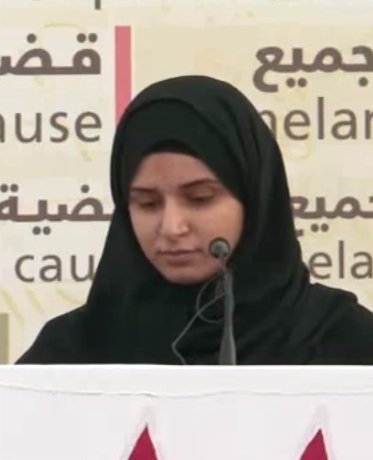
- Ayat Al-Qurmezi in 2014
- Born: Ayat Hassan Mohammed Al-Qurmezi; 1 January 1991 (age 35); Sanad, Bahrain
- Occupations: Bahraini poet, activist, and student
- Website: ayat-algormezi.blogspot.com

Ayat Hassan Mohammed Al-Qurmezi (Arabic: آيات حسن محمد القرمزي; also Al-Qormezi, al-Ghermezi; born 1 January 1991) is a poet and student at the University of Bahrain Teaching Institute in Bahrain.

Al-Qurmezi became famous in Bahrain and internationally after reading out a poem criticising Bahraini government policies to the Pearl Roundabout gathering of pro-democracy protesters. After the poem was widely circulated via social media she and her family were subjected to harassment and death threats (both online and offline).

She was arrested and detained in conditions of secrecy, and rumours of her death in custody led to protests by Iranian activists. She was subjected to torture while in custody but was eventually tried on charges of inciting hatred of the Bahraini regime and insulting members of the royal family. International human rights organisations described her detention and trial as illustrating the brutality of the Bahraini authorities. She was sentenced to a term of imprisonment, which she was allowed to serve under house arrest.

== Involvement in the Bahraini uprising (2011–present) ==
=== Public reading of poems ===
On Wednesday, 23 February 2011, during the early days of the Bahraini uprising, Ayat Al-Qurmezi delivered a poem from the podium to the gathering of pro-democracy demonstrators at the Pearl Roundabout, that was critical of government policies and specifically those of Khalifa ibn Salman Al Khalifa, the prime minister of Bahrain.

On 6 March 2011, she read out another poem to the crowd at Pearl Roundabout which criticized King Hamad bin Isa Al Khalifa. One verse included the lines: "We are the people who will kill humiliation and assassinate misery. Don't you hear their cries? Don't you hear their screams?" Another verse imagined a dialogue between the Devil and the King in which the Devil, Hamad's "best and most courageous pupil", says: "Hamad, your people have shaken me. Don't you hear their cries?"

External videos
- Ayat Al-Qurmezi reading her second poem on YouTube at Pearl Roundabout on 6 March 2011

The student quickly rose to fame through the media channels of YouTube, Twitter and through BlackBerry Messenger as her poem was spread throughout Bahrain and the rest of the world. Since then, Ayat has been exposed to several forms of harassment and death threats that included herself and her family. Her personal information has been published through emails and Blackberry messages. She has reportedly received numerous phone calls threatening her life and safety.

=== Arrest ===
On the morning of 29 March 2011, riot police accompanied by female police officers with orders to detain Ayat Al-Qurmezi forced their way into the family home. Not finding her there, the police proceeded to ransack the house, reportedly telling her mother that they intended to arrest Ayat "even if she is hidden in the depths of the earth".

The next day Ayat Al-Qurmezi was arrested after police raided her parents' house a second time and forced four of Ayat's brothers at gunpoint to lie on the floor. After one police officer shouted at their father "If you do not tell us where Ayat is in fifteen minutes, we will kill each of your sons in front of your eyes – I have orders to do so". Ayat's parents felt they had no choice but to ask her to return home.

When she returned she was taken away in a car with two plain-clothes security officials, a man and a woman, both wearing masks. She subsequently reported how they began immediately to beat her, threatening that she would be raped and sexually assaulted and that degrading photographs of her would be posted on the internet.

The family described the days that followed as a period of intense psychological torture. The riot troops and police (whose identities had been concealed) who took Ayat away had told Ayat's mother Sa'ada that after she had been interrogated and signed some documents, the family would be allowed to collect her from Al-Howra police station and take her home. They heard nothing more. Sa'ada went from police station to police station trying to obtain information about her daughter until she was eventually advised to file a missing person report. She complained about the absurdity of this advice when it was the police themselves who had taken Ayat away.

Pictures of Ayat began to turn up on dating and pornographic websites. The family heard rumours that she had been raped or killed.

Eventually, Sa'ada was allowed to speak to Ayat on the telephone. Ayat told her that she had been forced to sign a false confession. Sa'ada was told in confidence that Ayat was in a military hospital being treated for injuries inflicted while she was tortured. Ayat told her mother that she had been interrogated several times at the interrogation centre where she was taken after her arrest.

A video was broadcast on Bahraini state television of Ayat giving her name and saying that she was a Shia and hated Sunnis.

Ayat was expelled from university, apparently as part of a government purge of students and university employees accused of supporting the protests.

==== Local and international responses to arrest ====
- Al-Wefaq, the main opposition political group whose 18 parliamentary representatives resigned in protest against the harsh measures taken against the pro-democracy protesters, described Ayat Al-Qurmezi's arrest as a "clear message that the government is against freedom of expression."
- Amnesty International condemned the brutal behaviour of the Bahraini authorities and called for Ayat's release. Malcolm Smart, Amnesty International's Director for the Middle East and North Africa observed that:
  By locking up a female poet merely for expressing her views in public, Bahrain's authorities are demonstrating how free speech and assembly are brutally denied to ordinary Bahrainis.

He noted that Ayat al-Qarmezi had been put on trial merely for expressing her opinion, peacefully and openly, and describing her case as an appalling and sinister attack on free speech, he called for the charges against her to be dropped and for her to be released immediately.

- English PEN, reminding the Bahraini authorities of their obligations to protect the right to freedom of expression guaranteed by Article 19 of the International Covenant on Civil and Political Rights, to which Bahrain is an official state party, called for Ayat's immediate and unconditional release.
- Supporters circulated petitions and called for the release of the "Freedom Poet" through blogs and social media.
- The United Nations called for "an immediate cessation of trials of civilians in the court of national safety and an immediate release of peaceful demonstrators who were arrested in the context of the protest movement in February".

Following reports of Ayat Al-Qurmezi's rape and death in custody, there were protests by women in Iran and one of the vessels in a flotilla bringing Iranian activists to Bahrain to support the protesters was named after her. The Ayat Al-Qurmezi was intercepted and turned back by the Bahraini navy.

The Bahraini authorities defended the decision to detain and prosecute Ayat Al-Qurmezi on the grounds that her poem had called for "uprising and hatred against the leadership" and in Bahrain that was illegal.

=== Torture ===
External videos
- Bahrain T.V. showing Ayat's forced apology to the king and prime minister on 21 June 2011 on YouTube

Following her arrest, Ayat Al-Qurmezi was detained for nine days in a tiny and extremely cold cell. She believed that from time to time a gas of some kind was circulated through the cell's air conditioning system which made her feel that she was suffocating. She was struck around the face with an electric cable and made to clean lavatories with her bare hands. Some reports indicated that she was also threatened with rape. Throughout this time the police made no attempt to carry out any genuine interrogation. On 21 June 2011, she made a televised apology to the king and the prime minister.

According to Ayat Al-Qurmezi's brother, Yousif Mohammed, her treatment in prison improved during the period before the trial.

=== Trial ===
Ayat Al-Qurmezi was charged with "incitement to hatred of the regime", "insulting members of the royal family" and "illegal assembly".

After spending two months in custody she was tried by a security court at which no legal arguments were heard and her lawyer was not allowed to address the court. On 12 June 2011, Al-Qurmezi was found guilty and sentenced to one year's imprisonment. The court's ruling was denounced by opposition groups and Amnesty International, who said the verdict highlighted how free speech is "brutally denied" by Bahrain's authorities.

=== Release ===
On 13 July 2011, Al-Qurmezi was released from prison. A crowd of hundreds greeted her on her return home to Sanad. However, as of October 2011 her sentence had not been revoked, and she remained under house arrest. Her family feared she may be recalled to prison at any time. She had not received an official pardon, and her conviction had not been overturned on appeal.

== Student Peace Prize ==
On 1 October 2014, it was announced that Al-Qurmezi was awarded the 2015 Student Peace Prize "for her unwavering struggle for democracy and human rights in Bahrain".
