= Muqsha =

Coordinates: 26.221°N 50.515°E

Muqsha (Arabic: المقشع، al-Muqsha) is a village in Bahrain and is situated west of the capital Manama. It is also located along the northern part of Budaiya Highway, which separates it from the village of Qadam, south of Muqsha. Muqsha also borders the villages of Al-Hilla, Karbabad, and Al-Qalaa to the north, Karranah to the west, and Jidhafs to the east.
