= Death of Ali Jawad al-Sheikh =

2011 Bahraini uprising death

Ali Jawad al-Sheikh
- علي جواد الشيخ
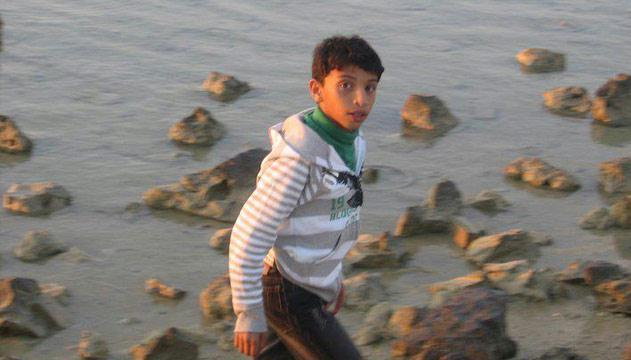
- Ali in 2010
- Born: 29 January 1997; Sitra, Bahrain
- Died: 31 August 2011 (aged 14); Sitra, Bahrain
- Known for: Bahraini uprising

Ali Jawad al-Sheikh (Arabic: علي جواد الشيخ) was a 14-year-old Bahraini who died at a hospital on 31 August 2011 after reportedly being hit in the head by a tear gas canister fired by Bahraini security forces during the Bahraini uprising. The Bahraini government denied security force involvement in his death and offered a reward for information on the incident. Activists, however, began a series of large protests after his funeral.

== Background ==
As part of a string of protests that occurred across the Arab World following the self-immolation and eventual death of Mohammed Bouazizi in Tunisia, large numbers of Bahrainis took to the streets demanding greater freedoms. The move was seen as potentially destabilising to the regime of Bahrain, following which a brutal government crackdown led to widespread suppressions of the Shia people across many sectors, especially the medical field after the intervention in Bahrain by Gulf Cooperation Council soldiers led by Saudi Arabia. The Bahraini government also hired Pakistani mercenaries to maintain security against the protesters, however, lesser intermittent protests continued.

== Death ==
External videos
- Al Jazeera English report about Ali's death (with Arabic translation) on YouTube

A number of protesters, including Isa Hassan, Ali's uncle, took part in a demonstration in Sitra, Bahrain, on 31 August just after morning prayers. They stated that they were "confronted by the police, who fired tear gas at them from roughly 20 feet away", which caused Ali Jawad al-Sheikh's death. In an interview with the Associated Press, Isa explained that "they are supposed to lob the canisters of gas, not shoot them at people. Police used it as a weapon."

After his death, Ali's body was moved from the hospital to the morgue, where the Interior Ministry conducted an autopsy and compiled a forensic report based on the results. Investigators from the Bahrain Independent Commission of Inquiry were present during the autopsy, and compiled their own forensic report. In the afternoon, Osama al-Asfoor, the head of public prosecution, stated that the autopsy had shown that "Ali had died of injuries to the back of his neck" and that "the boy had injuries under his chin and bruises on his face, hand, knees and pelvic area." However, he also added that a "blood examination showed no effects of tear gas exposure." The Interior Ministry's forensic report concluded that Ali's injuries were inconsistent with an impact from a tear gas canister, as the markings on his neck were too large. The Commission's forensic report concluded that Ali's injuries were consistent with an impact from an unexploded tear gas canister fired at short range.

== Aftermath ==
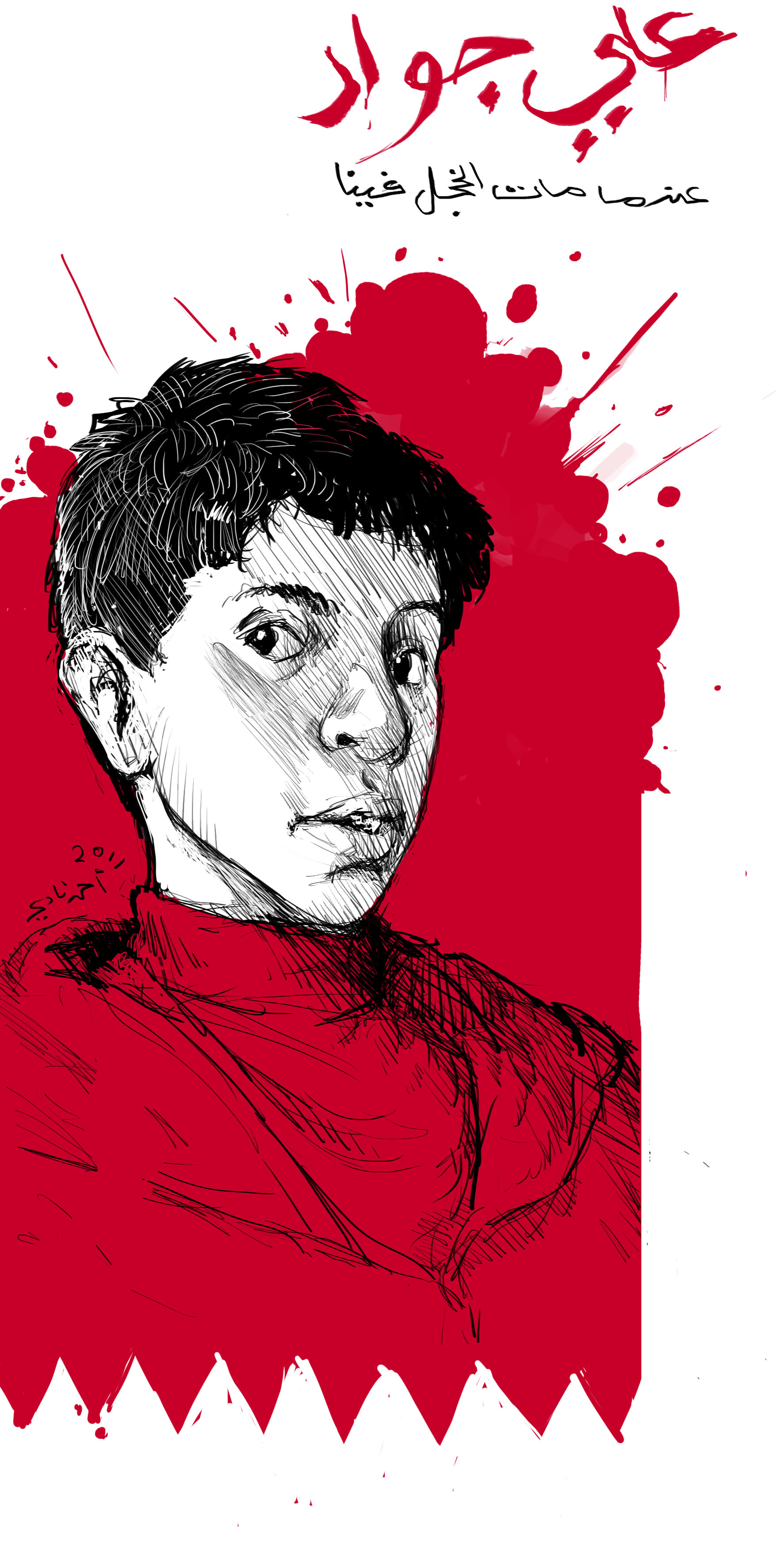
Political cartoon of Ali Jawad al-Sheikh by Ahmad Nady.

Photographs of Ali directly after being injured were released by the Bahrain Youth Society for Human Rights. Mohammed al-Maskati, the leader of the Society, said that, "The picture is affecting people." A videotape had also been made of Ali's family around his body in the hospital. Nabeel Rajab, the president of the Bahrain Centre for Human Rights, explained that the video was "a gift to the people". The father of Ali, Jawad al-Sheikh, asked in an interview with CNN for "human rights groups to take steps against Bahrain's leaders, saying, 'I lost my child. ... He does not deserve this destiny.'"

The government acknowledged Ali's death, but stated in a report from the state-run news agency that "no reported police action against lawbreakers in Sitra" had occurred the morning of that day and that the security forces had last been involved in "dispersing a small group of around 10 people at 1:15 a.m." that day. The Ministry of the Interior then also set out a "reward of more than $26,000 for information about those responsible for his death."

Activists who had taken part in the uprising stated that police had surrounded the hospital where Ali had died, effectively preventing any gatherings of people in the area. The activists also stated their intention to have a protest on 1 September 2011, after attending Ali's funeral earlier that day. Clashes with police, however, began on 31 August and continued into the morning of September 1.

=== Funeral and protests ===
The funeral procession was held early on 1 September, with photographs of Ali both before he died and of his dead body covering the coffin. It had already been delayed for some hours, as Ali's father was unwilling to sign the death certificate for release of his son's body, since the cause of death listed was stated to be "unknown". It is uncertain if the certificate was ever signed or if the body was just released.

Activists stated that thousands of people attended his funeral. Afterwards, the mourners began marching in the streets of Sitra carrying pictures of Ali and chanting 'Down, down, Hamad!'". No security personnel were present at the protest and the protesters had dispersed by the afternoon. However, extensive protests were held in the national capital of Manama that night as the protesters tried to take back control of the Pearl Roundabout, which was the site of protests earlier in the year until a government crackdown and the destruction of the monument. Government forces used tear gas and blocked roads with buses to stop the protests.

== Local reactions ==
Sheik Isa Qassim, a senior Shiite cleric, has blamed security forces for the death of Ali Jawad, saying, "the killing of a 14-year-old boy by security forces during an anti-government demonstration Wednesday shows that the island nation's rulers are not listening to people's demands for greater rights."

== See also ==
- Death of Ahmed Jaber al-Qattan
- Death of Ali Abdulhadi Mushaima
- Killing of Khaled Mohamed Saeed
- Killing of Hamza Ali al-Khateeb
- Killing of Neda Agha-Soltan
