= Mohammed Mushaima =

Mohammed Ali Ahmad Mushaima (in Arabic محمد علي أحمد مشيمع) (c.1988 – 2 October 2012) was a Shia Bahraini political activist. Mushaima had been convicted in March 2011 and subsequently sentenced to a seven years for taking part in anti-government demonstrations. Mushaima was pronounced dead in Manama, Bahrain, on 2 October 2012 as a result of complications from sickle-cell anemia. He had been hospitalized since August 2011 and his lawyers had said they had asked the Bahraini courts to release Mushaima because of his bad health, but the courts had rejected the request. Opposition sources say he died due to "torture and medical negligence" by the authorities. Other jailed protesters have also died from the disease, a hereditary condition common in Bahrain, prompting Human Rights Watch to call for an investigation. After his funeral, clashes erupted in Manama as protesters took to the streets, demanding an investigation into the circumstances of Mushaima's death.
