= Death of Ahmed Jaber al-Qattan =

2011 death of a Bahraini teenager

Ahmed Jaber Ali al-Qattan
- Born: أحمد جابر علي القطّان c. 1995; Shakhoora, Bahrain
- Died: 6 October 2011 (aged 16-17); Abu Saiba, Bahrain
- Cause of death: Gunshot wounds from birdshot
- Resting place: Shakhoora, Bahrain
- Known for: Bahraini uprising (2011–present)

Ahmed Jaber Ali al-Qattan (Arabic: أحمد جابر علي القطّان) was a 16 or 17-year-old Bahraini who died in a hospital on 6 October 2011 after reportedly being hit in the chest, abdomen and upper limb by birdshot pellets fired by Bahraini security forces during the Bahraini uprising (2011–present). Several human rights organizations in Bahrain believe that the use of birdshot against humans is banned under international law, while the Ministry of Interior disagrees. The Ministry of Interior stated that there was a gathering of 20 people in Abu Saiba who blocked the roads and policemen intervened to disperse them as authorized. Activists, however, began a series of large protests after his funeral.

== Background ==
As part of a string of protests that occurred across the Arab World following the self-immolation and eventual death of Mohammed Bouazizi in Tunisia, the mostly Shia population of Bahrain took to the streets demanding greater freedoms. The move was seen as potentially destabilising to the Sunni-led regime of Bahrain, following which a brutal government crackdown led to widespread suppressions of the Shia people across many sectors, especially the medical field after the invasion of Bahrain by Gulf Cooperation Council soldiers led by Saudi Arabia. The Bahraini government also hired Pakistani mercenaries to maintain security against the protesters, however, lesser intermittent protests continued.

According to Al Wefaq opposition party and Bahrain Centre for Human Rights al-Qattan was 16; the government put his age at 17.

== Death ==
A number of protesters took part in a demonstration in Abu Saiba, Bahrain which started on late night of 6 October. The government's Information Affairs Authority said the area where al-Qattan was in, Abu Saiba, west of Manama, saw clashes that evening. It said youths blocked roads and set fire to rubbish bins and police fired tear gas and sound grenades when they were attacked with rocks and petrol bombs.

An anonymous witness who was protesting with Ahmed said in an interview with Bahrain Mirror (opposition online newspaper): "We were 70 protesters and Ahmed was in the front, we were ambushed by security forces. They were standing only 10 meters away from us, they didn't use tear gas or rubber bullets, they used bird pellet gunshots directly. Ahmed was injured in the chest and another protester who was behind him injured in the abdomen. He was trying to protect protesters behind him, we ran back to hide. Ahmed ran for a short distance then fell, he called his friend "Ahmed, hold me, I want to breathe". Those were his last words". He added: "A young protester was hiding behind a building rushed to Ahmed as he fell and carried him. With other protesters we carried him through farms to avoid being chased by police. At first we didn't know what to do, so I tweeted specific people like Al Wefaq and some human rights activists. The first to respond was Yousef al-Mahafdha (member of BCHR) who contacted some medics. Medics came, but they found no pulse and requested taking Ahmed to a hospital. At Bahrain International hospital (located in Jidhafs area of the capital, and sits along Budaiya Highway) medics from the hospital attached medical instruments to Ahmed and after 15 minutes announced that he is dead and asked us to leave fast to avoid arrest. Human rights activist Yousif Al-Mahafdha was the first to announce the death of Ahmed from Bahrain international hospital."

After his death, Ahmed's body was moved to Bahrain International hospital where he was initially examined. Later it was moved to Salmaniya hospital morgue for an autopsy. Ahmed's older brother was told by young male to attend at Bahrain International hospital. At the hospital, without explaining anything to his brother, Ahmed's body was taken to Salmaniya hospital morgue. For 20 minutes Ahmed's brother was stopped by security forces from getting into the morgue where Ahmed's body was. After a while he tried again, but this time a National Security Agency officer yelled at him. When Ahmed's brother explained that he's only trying to see his brother's body and security shouldn't act this way. The officer responded with "I'm a soldier and I can do whatever I want with you right now if you don't stop attempting to get in". Later, a policeman in civilian clothes spoke to the family. He told them that Ahmed died a natural death, his chest doesn't contain bird pellet gunshots and that his body is completely clean from any injures. Then he asked the family to bring him some of Ahmed's clothes in order to investigate the cause of his death. The family wasn't allowed to see the body until next morning when they received it.

One of the lawyers responded to the family's cries on Twitter and came along with a lawyer from Bahrain Independent Commission of Inquiry. Security forces allowed Al-jeshy and his companion to enter the morgue, where the Public Prosecutor announced that the direct cause of death was due to injury by bird pellet gunshots which went through Ahmed's body into his heart and caused a severe bleeding.

== Aftermath ==
At first the Ministry of Interior stated that Ahmed al-Qattan had died from severe respiratory and blood flow problems after he was received in hospital without saying what caused this. In another statement the ministry stated that they were launching an investigation into the incident "after the report of the medical examiner of the Public Prosecution attributed the death to injury" by bird pellet gunshots, but did not describe under what circumstance al-Qattan was fatally wounded. The statement said that "legal procedures would be taken according to the results of the investigation." Moreover, Bahrain News Agency, an official governmental website said that Ahmed died by police birdshot.

On 8 October, two days after Ahmed's death, Nawaf Al-Awadi, the attorney general of the northern governorate, stated that police had not used bird pellet gunshots while tackling protesters in Abu Saiba that night and that the gunshots found in Ahmed's body did not match those used by the Ministry of Interior. Al-Awadi also stated that the investigations were still ongoing to find the persons who carried the body to the hospital to question.

Shia activists said al-Qattan died from bird-shot pellets and distributed photos of his body in the morgue. "(He) was shot by the security forces at close proximity during a protest with the pellet shotgun, which seems to have penetrated his heart and/or lung and caused his death," said Maryam Alkhawaja a human rights activist working for Bahrain Centre for Human Rights (BCHR). Al Wefaq party, the biggest shia opposition party said in a statement: "Security forces have killed the boy Ahmed al-Qattan after shooting him with the internationally prohibited pellet shotgun (..) many people who are injured due to use of force by security forces are afraid to go to hospitals, because they might be arrested there."

=== Funeral and protests ===
External videos
- Ahmed Jaber al-Qattan funeral on YouTube

The funeral procession was held afternoon on 7 October. Security forces sat up roadblocks to prevent people from attending the funeral, yet thousands of people attended the funeral which is thought to be one of the largest in months. The number of mourners who took part in al-Qattan's funeral was over 10,000. The funeral march moved through the villages of Shakhoora, Janusan and Karrana, with participants carrying the red and white flags of Bahrain and chanting, "We will redeem you, Bahrain" and "Down with Hamad," a reference to King Hamad, whose family, Al Khalifa has controlled Bahrain for about 230 years. Al-Qattan was to be buried in Shakhoora, his home town.

After the funeral hundreds of mourners marched towards Burgerland roundabout where police forces were present heavily. Police used tear gas, sound grenades and rubber bullets to disperse protesters, injuring no less than 11 protesters, according to activists. Some protesters threw stones at police. "More injuries were expected, though the chaotic scene around a makeshift clinic near the clashes made it impossible to verify the number," Al Jazeera's reporter in Bahrain said. An Al Jazeera reporter said he saw four injured protesters, three of them apparently due to rubber bullets and one "suffered a severe facial injury after being hit by a sound grenade." by night, clashes were over.

Ministry of Interior said "A group of vandals blocked Budaiya highway after funeral of Ahmed Jaber, which led to interference of security forces to bring situation to normal".

On 10 October, 3 days after Ahmed's funeral, where the final mourning rituals were supposed to be held in Shakhoora, security forces blocked all the roads leading to Shakhoora to prevent people from participating in the mourning rituals. Al Jazeera reported that security forces fired tear gas and rubber bullets on tens of protesters who were trying to start a demonstration after the end of mourning rituals and that some protesters were arrested.

== Local and international responses ==
- Former Al Wefaq MP Matar Matar said that: "There was a great sense of outrage today. The government claims they will investigate the death and that an independent commission of monitors has been formed, but the injuries and deaths continue to happen. Woman and children must be careful." The party issued a statement reading: "The martyrdom of young Jaber falls under the systematic oppression of those demanding democracy in Bahrain."
- Hassiba Hadj Sahraoui, Deputy Director of Amnesty International’s Middle East and North Africa Programme, said: "The tragic death of Ahmed al-Jaber al-Qatan must be independently investigated and those responsible must be brought to justice. If it is found that security forces have opened fire on peaceful protesters when they were not in a life threatening situation, that would be yet again another unacceptable case of excessive use of force."

== See also ==
- Bahiya Al Aradi
- Death of Ali Jawad al-Sheikh
- Death of Ali Abdulhadi Mushaima
- Death of Fadhel Al-Matrook
