= Sanad, Bahrain =

Town in Bahrain

Coordinates: 26°09′N 50°35′E

Sanad سند
- Town
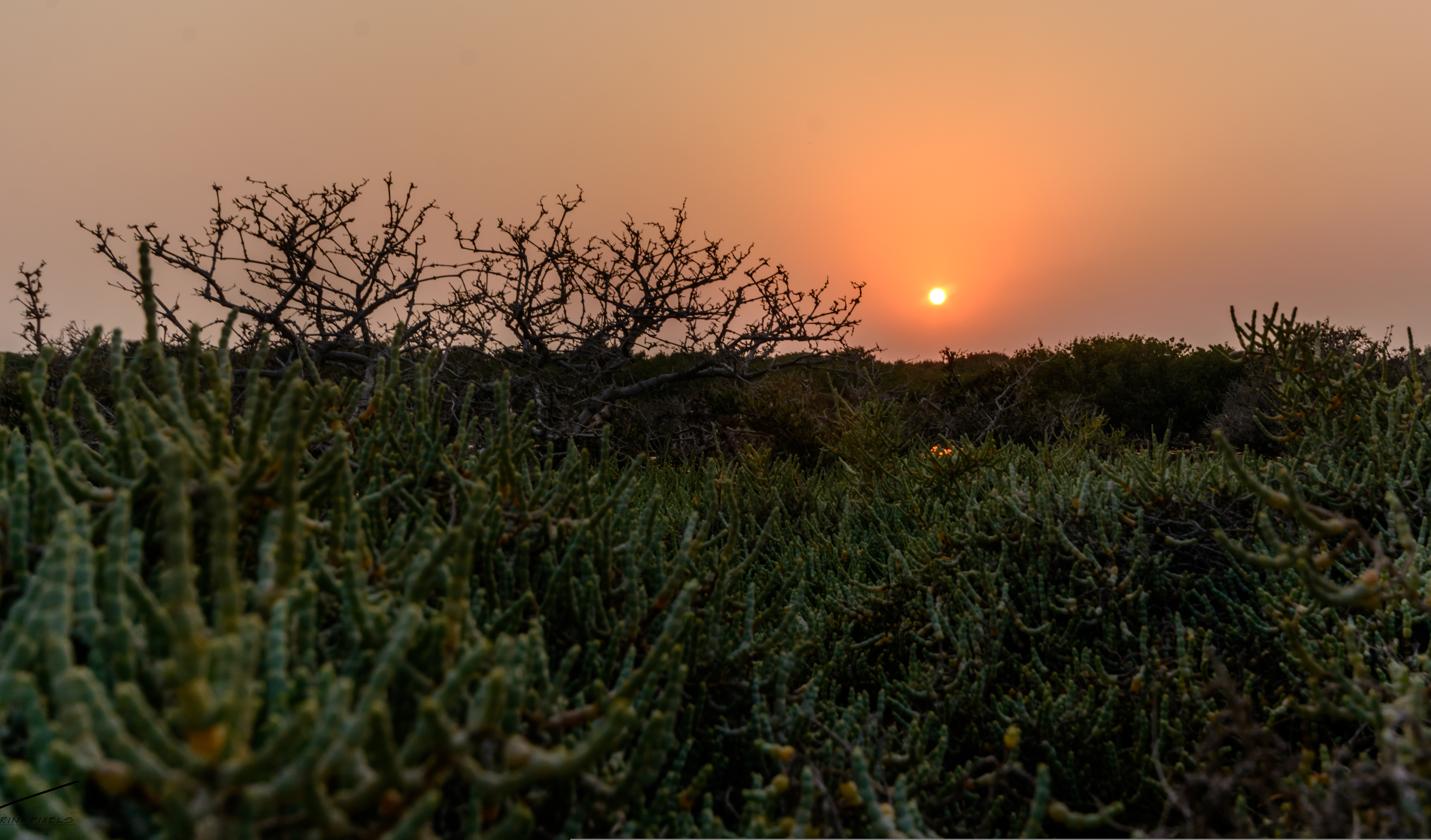

- Location within Bahrain
- Country: Bahrain
- Governorate: Capital

Sanad is a town in Bahrain.

Location of Sanad

The town neighbors Isa Town, Riffa and Jurdab. Sanad is mainly a residential area. There is a mangrove forest on the sea shores of Sanad and the area which is environmentally protected attracts large flocks of flamingo birds. Some of the restaurants located in Sanad are Hardee's, McDonald's, Papa John's, and Yum Yum Tree.

The town is divided into four regions: Al Nasfah, New Sanad, Old Sanad, and the Estiqlal Highway, a major highway in Bahrain that connects the towns of Riffa, Askar, and Isa Town.

The American pop star Michael Jackson lived in Sanad for a short period.

Jawad's The Centre was introduced in the summer of 2007, hosting shopping stores and the Jawad supermarket.

The Gulf University is located in Sanad.

== See also ==
- Gulf University, Bahrain
