= Timeline of the 2011 Bahraini uprising =

Bahraini uprising of 2011
- Part of the Arab Spring
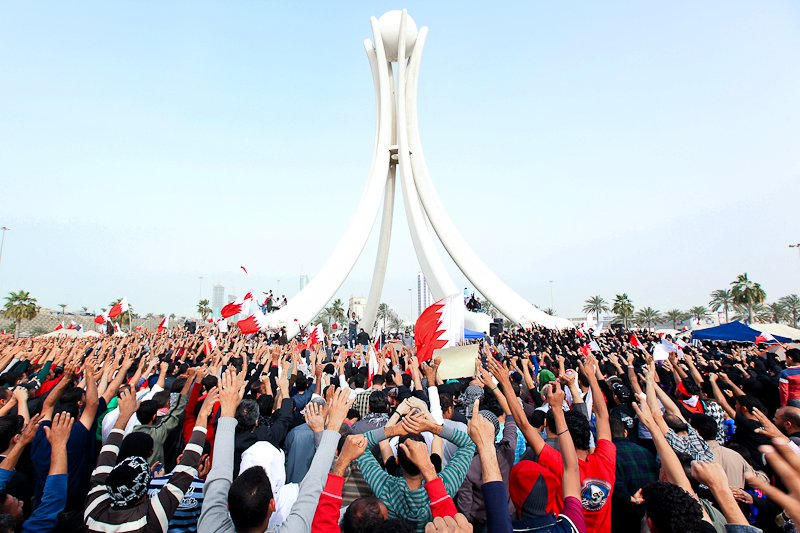
- Date: 14 February 2011 – March 2011
- Location: Bahrain
- Caused by: Corruption, discrimination against Shias, unemployment, slow pace of democratisation and Inspiration from concurrent regional protests
- Goals: Constitutional monarchy, rewrite the Constitution, ending economic and human rights violations, fair elections and freedom.
- Methods: Civil resistance, Demonstrations, hunger strikes and General strikes
- Result: Uprising suppressed.; Continued occasional demonstrations.

The following is a timeline of the Bahraini uprising from February to March 2011, beginning with the start of protests in February 2011 and including the Saudi and Emirati-backed crackdown from 15 March.

== Timeline ==
=== February 2011 ===
==== 4 February ====
Several hundred Bahrainis gathered in front of the Egyptian embassy in Manama to express solidarity with anti-government protesters there. According to The Wall Street Journal, this was "one of the first such gatherings to be held in the oil-rich Persian Gulf states." At the gathering, Ibrahim Sharif, the secretary-general of the National Democratic Action Society (Wa'ad), called for "local reform."

==== 14 February - 'Day of Rage' ====
Police dispersed demonstrations such as this one in Diraz on 14 February

External videos
- Clashes in Sitra on 14 February on YouTube
- Protesters at the Pearl Roundabout on 15 February on YouTube

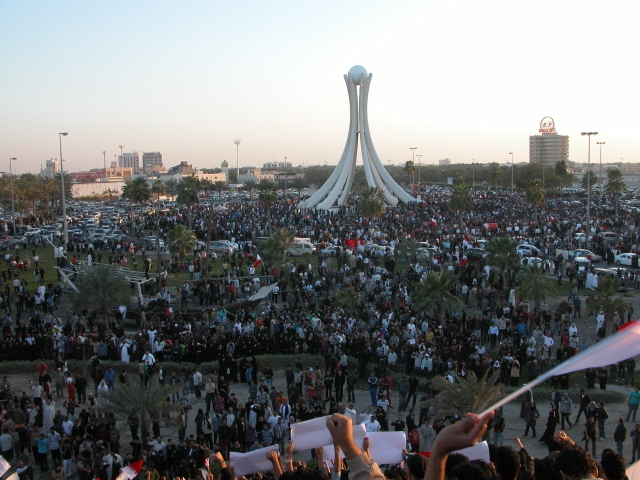
Protesters gathered at the Pearl Roundabout for the first time on 15 February

On 14 February, an estimated 6,000 people participated in many demonstrations and political rallies throughout Bahrain. The protesters' demands varied, and included constitutional reform, political reform, and socio-economic justice. No permits were sought by protesters, as which are required by Bahraini law for such gatherings. The earliest demonstration was recorded at 05:30 in the mainly-Shia village of Nuwaidrat, where 300 people are said to have participated. The marchers were demanding the release of those detained during earlier protests. Police dispersed this rally, resulting in some injuries, and the hospitalization of one demonstrator. Police continued to disperse rallies throughout the day with tear gas, rubber bullets, and shotguns, resulting in additional injuries, and the hospitalization of three more demonstrators.

One major demonstration took place in the Shi'a island of Sitra, where several thousand men, women, and children took to the streets. According to witnesses interviewed by Physicians for Human Rights, hundreds of fully armed riot police arrived on the scene and immediately began firing tear gas and sound grenades into the crowds to cause panic. They then fired rubber bullets into the unarmed crowd, aiming at people in the front line who had sat down on the street in protest.

In the evening of 14 February, Ali Mushaima died from wounds from police shotgun to his back fired at close range. The government says that Ali was part of a group of 500 protesters that attacked 6 policemen with rocks and metal rods. The government claims that the police exhausted their supply of tear gas and rubber bullets in a failed attempt to disperse the crowd, and resorted to the use of shotguns. Witnesses say that there were no demonstrations at the time Ali was shot. They say Ali was seen walking with a group of officers who were pointing their guns at him. As Ali walked away, he was shot in the back by one of the officers. Later, several hundred demonstrators congregated in the car park of the hospital where Ali was taken. The Ministry of Interior expressed its regret at the incident and announced that his death would be investigated.

==== 15–16 February ====
Thousands of mourners participated in Ali Mushaima's funeral. During the funeral, Fadhel Al-Matrook was shot by police in the back at close range, and he died within the hour from his shotgun wounds. The government says that Fadhel was part of a group of 400 mourners that attacked 7 policemen with rocks and metal rods. The government claims that the police exhausted their supply of tear gas and rubber bullets in a failed attempt to disperse the crowd, and resorted to the use of shotguns. Witnesses say that police shot Fadhel in the back as he bent over to help a mourner who collapsed when police fired tear gas at Ali's funeral. Protesters, angered by this second death, marched to Pearl Roundabout around 15:00, and began to set up tents. The number of demonstrators swelled to up to ten thousand by nightfall. Police did not attempt to disperse demonstrators at the roundabout, as Bahrain's King, Hamad bin Isa Al Khalifa, had ordered that people be permitted to occupy the Pearl Roundabout to express their sadness.

Mohammed Albuflasa, a former officer in the Bahrain Defence Force, disappeared after he gave an evening speech at the roundabout calling for national unity between Sunnis and Shia, and expressing support of the protests. The speech was noteworthy because Mohammed is a religiously conservative Sunni Muslim, whereas most of the protesters were Shia or secular Sunnis. The government first acknowledged on 4 March that he was in their custody.

In reaction to the two deaths, Bahrain's main trade union federation, the General Federation of Bahrain Trade Unions, called for a general strike beginning on 17 February, and Al Wefaq, the party with the largest number of seats in Bahrain's parliament, announced it would suspend its participation in Parliament. In an evening address on state television to mark the occasion of Mawlid, King Hamad offered condolences for the two deaths, and announced the establishment of a committee to investigate the events of the past two days. Throughout the day, 25 people were said to have been injured, and hospital records at Bahrain's main public hospital show seven admissions related to the protests.

On 16 February, thousands of protesters continued to occupy Pearl Roundabout. Witnesses described the mood at the roundabout as "festive," with protesters distributing tea, coffee, and food while discussing the situation in Bahrain. Various political figures gave speeches at the roundabout. Elsewhere in Bahrain, a funeral procession was held for Fadhel Al-Matrook, and a vehicular procession comprising around 100 cars was held by supporters of King Hamad. Police did not interfere with these events. Two individuals were admitted to Bahrain's main public hospital for injuries related to ongoing protests on 16 February.

The scheduled GP2 Asia Series race at the Bahrain International Circuit was cancelled, after a practice had to be called off due to the redeployment of the circuit's medical staff to hospitals in the capital. A practice session for the 2011 Formula One season Bahrain Grand Prix was also called off, and officials expressed concern that the race would need to be moved or cancelled.

==== 17 February – "Bloody Thursday" ====
External videos
- Armored personnel carriers in Manama on 17 February on YouTube

Three protesters died in the 17 February police raid on the Pearl Roundabout

At about 3:00 am local time on 17 February, around 1,000 police were dispatched to clear the Pearl Roundabout of an estimated 1,500 individuals staying overnight in tents. Police were armed with sticks, shields, flash grenades, tear gas, and shotguns. Two hundred and thirty one individuals were said to have been injured during the raid, and seventy individuals were reported missing. Three individuals were killed by police using shotguns. Of these three, two were shot in the back at close range, and one was shot in the thigh at close range. The government claims that the lethal shots were fired at protesters who attacked police officers with swords, daggers, and other weapons. The Bahrain Independent Commission of Inquiry, set up by the King to report on the events of February and March, did not see any evidence to support the government's claim that protesters were armed.

The raid resulted in the destruction of the encampment. In the aftermath of the raid, security forces declared the protest camp to be illegal, and placed barbed wire around the roundabout. Around an hour after the raid, a group of protesters began to march back towards the roundabout. Police shot one protester in his head at a distance of a few centimeters with a shotgun, killing him. Police claim that this group of protesters attacked officers using metal rods, swords, Molotov cocktails, stones, and other weapons.

The government claimed that they found pistols, bullets, and a large quantity of knives, daggers, swords, and other sharp objects, in addition to Hezbollah flags at the roundabout. At a news conference, Foreign Minister Khalid ibn Ahmad Al Khalifah alleged, and expressed his surprise, that protesters had attacked police. Al Wefaq, the National Democratic Action Society, and five other opposition political parties issued a joint statement rejecting the government's charge that the demonstrators were armed, and condemning "the heinous massacre" perpetrated by police. All 18 Members of Parliament from Al Wefaq, the only opposition political party represented in Parliament, submitted their resignations.

Sporadic clashes broke out around the country hours after the raid. In the afternoon, the Bahrain Defence Force deployed tanks, and at least 50 armored personnel carriers armed with machine guns around Bahrain's capital Manama. Military checkpoints were set up in the streets, and army patrols circulated. The Interior Ministry issued a warning to stay off the streets, and the army warned that they were ready to take punitive measures to restore order.

According to an Al Jazeera English correspondent, hospitals in Manama were full of people injured during the police raid, including medical personnel who were attacked by police while trying to help the wounded. By the evening, thousands of demonstrators had congregated at the main hospital, where records showed 41 admissions related to the protests on 17 February. Bahrain's Minister of Health appeared on state television and claimed that the situation at the main hospital was calm, and there were only seven minor injuries.

==== 18–25 February ====
Three protesters including Buhmaid fell to the ground when army forces opened fire.

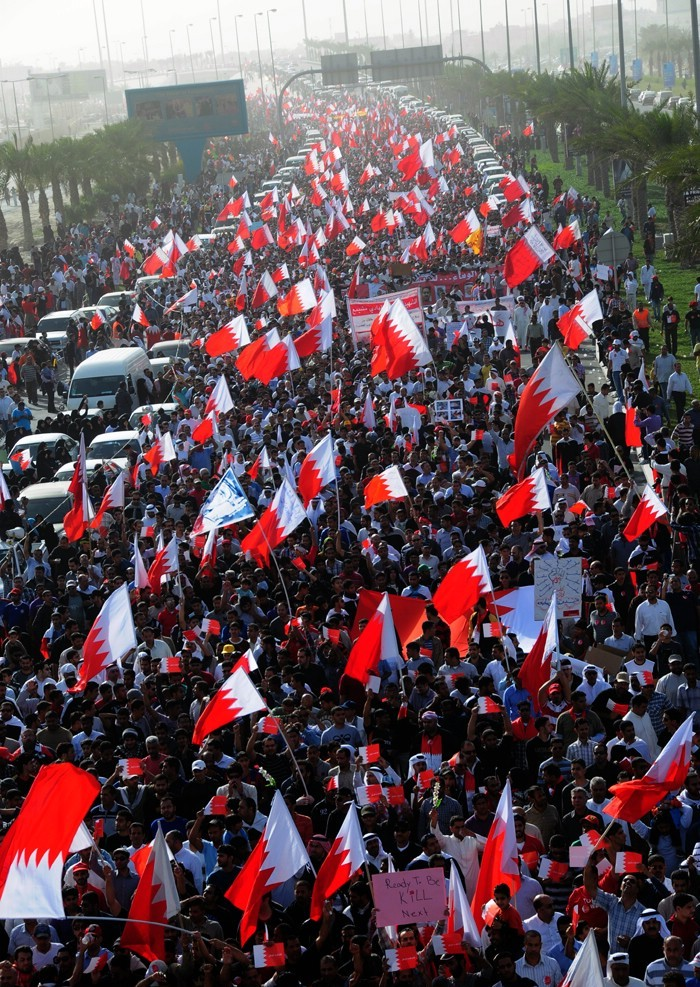
Hundreds of thousands of Bahrainis taking part in the "March of Loyalty to Martyrs", honoring political dissidents killed by security forces, on 22 February.

On 18 February, government forces used live ammunition against protesters, mourners and news reporters, with multiple casualties reported. Security forces fired on medics loading the wounded into ambulances. Abdulredha Buhmaid died and at least sixty-six were wounded.

The protesters moved into the centre of Manama from the funerals of protesters killed in a security crackdown earlier in the week, and then were fired on by Bahraini army. Some protesters held their hands up high and shouted, "Peaceful! Peaceful!"

On 19 February, military and police forces withdrew from the capital on orders from the government. Thousands of protesters were then able to return to the Pearl Roundabout.

On 20 February, "teachers, lawyers and engineers" from Manama joined the protests and the protests were calmer than in the previous week.

On 21 February, the Bahrain News Agency, a branch of Bahrain's Ministry of Culture and Information, claimed that 300,000 Bahraini residents (more than fifty percent of the local population; Bahrain local population is 568,000), has gathered in the grounds opposite Al Fateh Mosque in Manama to support the ruling monarchy. It was announced that the 2011 Bahrain Grand Prix would be postponed from its original date on 13 March to a later date.

On 22 February, a Martyr's March was announced and a funeral of one of the protesters killed earlier in the week also took place, along with the expected arrival of Hasan Mushaima, the leader of the opposition group Haq movement. Pro-monarchy demonstrators marched in large numbers in other parts of the city.

Reports suggested that over 100,000 anti-government protesters were out on the streets, more than seventeen percent (17%) of all Bahrainis, the march extended up to 3 kilometres (1.9 miles) long.

King Hamad ordered the release of 308 political prisoners.

For the tenth day in a row, on 23 February anti-government protests continued and protesters were still present at the Pearl Roundabout. The Shia Ulama Council called for a big rally on 25 February, after Friday prayers to mark a day of mourning for the protesters killed by security forces. The protests planned to start from two different locations, one of which is the Salmaniya Medical Complex, which received all the medical cases since the start of the anti-government protests, with the other being the Seef junction. The two rallies were to meet in Pearl Square. US Joint Chiefs of Staff chairman Mike Mullen visited Manama to meet King Hamad and Crown Prince Salman. He said the visit was aimed at "reaffirming, reassuring and also trying to understand where the leaderships of these countries are going, and in particular in Bahrain."

The BBC News reported that crowds of more than fifteen thousand continued to gather in Pearl Square without signs of police or army presence on the streets. The government declared a national day of mourning in respect of protesters who had been killed in previous clashes. Meanwhile, opposition leader Hassan Mushaima remained in Lebanon where he alleged that he was being denied passage to Bahrain contrary to promises by the government that he would no longer be wanted for arrest.

==== 26 February – 5 March ====
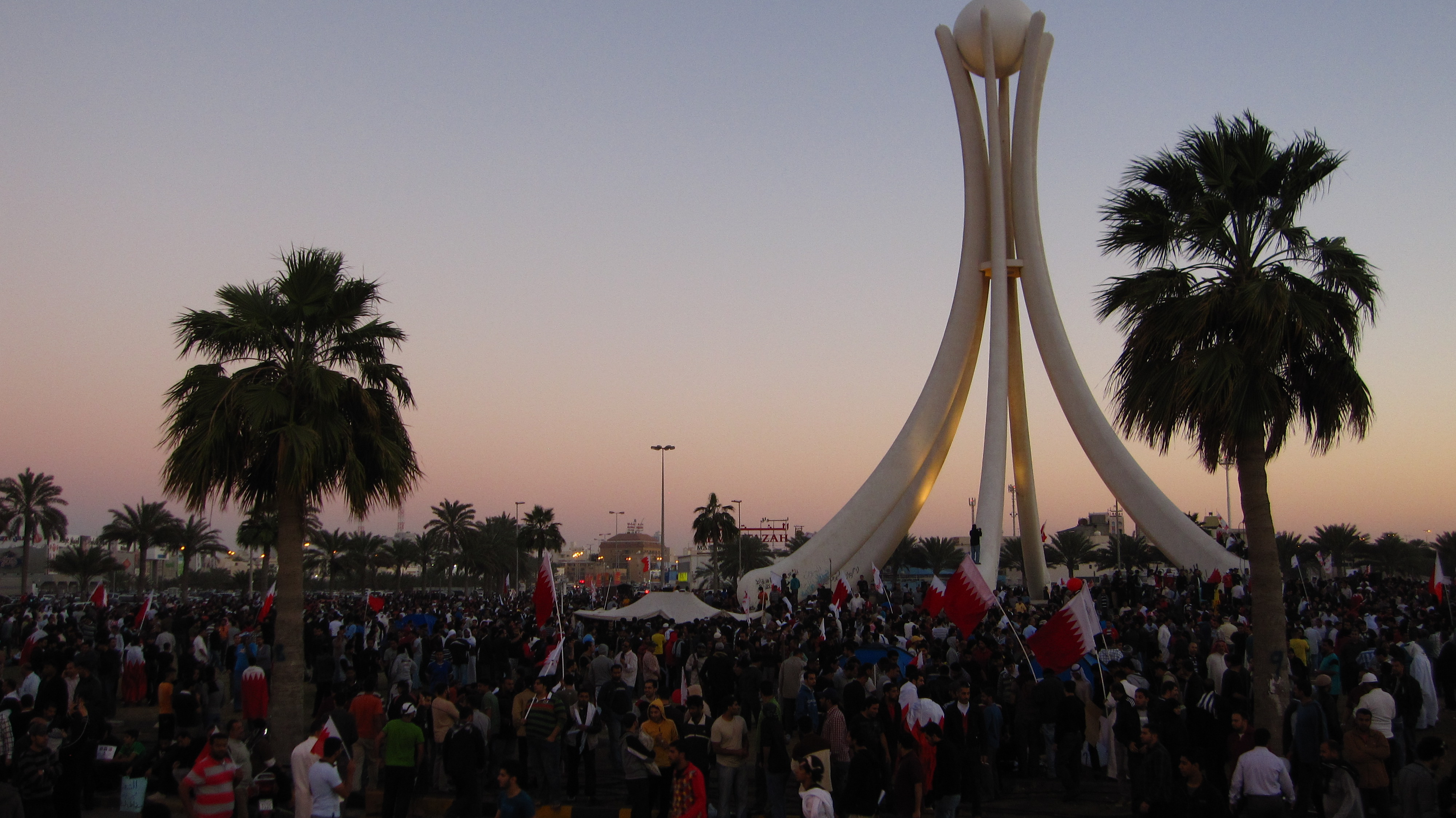

On 26 February, the king dismissed several ministers in an apparent move to appease the opposition. The government also announced that it would cancel twenty-five percent of housing loans that had been already given to citizens. However, the opposition's responded negatively, as the ministerial changes was not one of their demands. Resigned parliament member Abduljalil Khalil commented that this change was a sign of the government's lack of good will, claiming that, by doing these minor changes the government is just trying to avoid the core problems. Opposition leader Hasan Mushaima was released by Lebanese authorities after being detained for two days due to an Interpol warrant that had been issued in 2010. Protests took place in the night, which also followed his return.

On 27 February, protesters planned to march to the Ministry of Justice to demand the release of more political prisoners. The protesters called for a general strike planned for 6 March.

On 28 February, protesters surrounded the National Assembly building, blocking access for two and a half hours.

=== March 2011 ===
==== 1 – 5 March ====
On 1 March, an anti-government rally was called by the seven opposition groups in Bahrain, tens of thousands of protesters took part, the rally was named the National Unity Rally.

By 2 March, anti-government protesters continued to occupy the Pearl Roundabout, while a pro-government rally was convened at the Al Fateh centre in Manama and believed to be the largest national gathering in the history of Bahrain. A number of different protests were staged, a protest in front of the Ministries of Interior and Education, thousands of primary and secondary students took peaceful protests to the streets and a car rally was organised that drove through the country.

Bahrain's lower chamber agreed to discuss the following week (decision of acceptance was to be issued on 29 March) the mass resignation (following the 14 February killing of a protester and the injury of several more) of the eighteen lawmakers representing Al Wefaq.

On 3 March, police intervened with tear gas to disperse young Sunnis (Originally Syrian ) and indigenous Bahrani Shi'a Muslims who clashed in Hamad Town. This was the first incident of sectarian violence since the anti-government demonstrations started. The same day, Abduljalil Khalil, a senior leader of the Shia opposition, said that they were prepared to accept the ruling family's offer of entering into a dialogue to address their political grievances.

On 4 March, tens of thousands of anti-government demonstrators gathered outside the headquarters of Bahrain's state television, chanting slogans against the ruling dynasty. Sheikh Ali Salman, the head of the Islamic National Accord Association, the main Shia political formation, called for Sunni-Shia harmony, following the sectarian clashes a day earlier. Six opposition groups officially submitted their demands to the government, conditions that include the abolition of the 2002 constitution and "the election of a constitutional assembly for drafting a new basic law" for the country.

==== 6–15 March ====
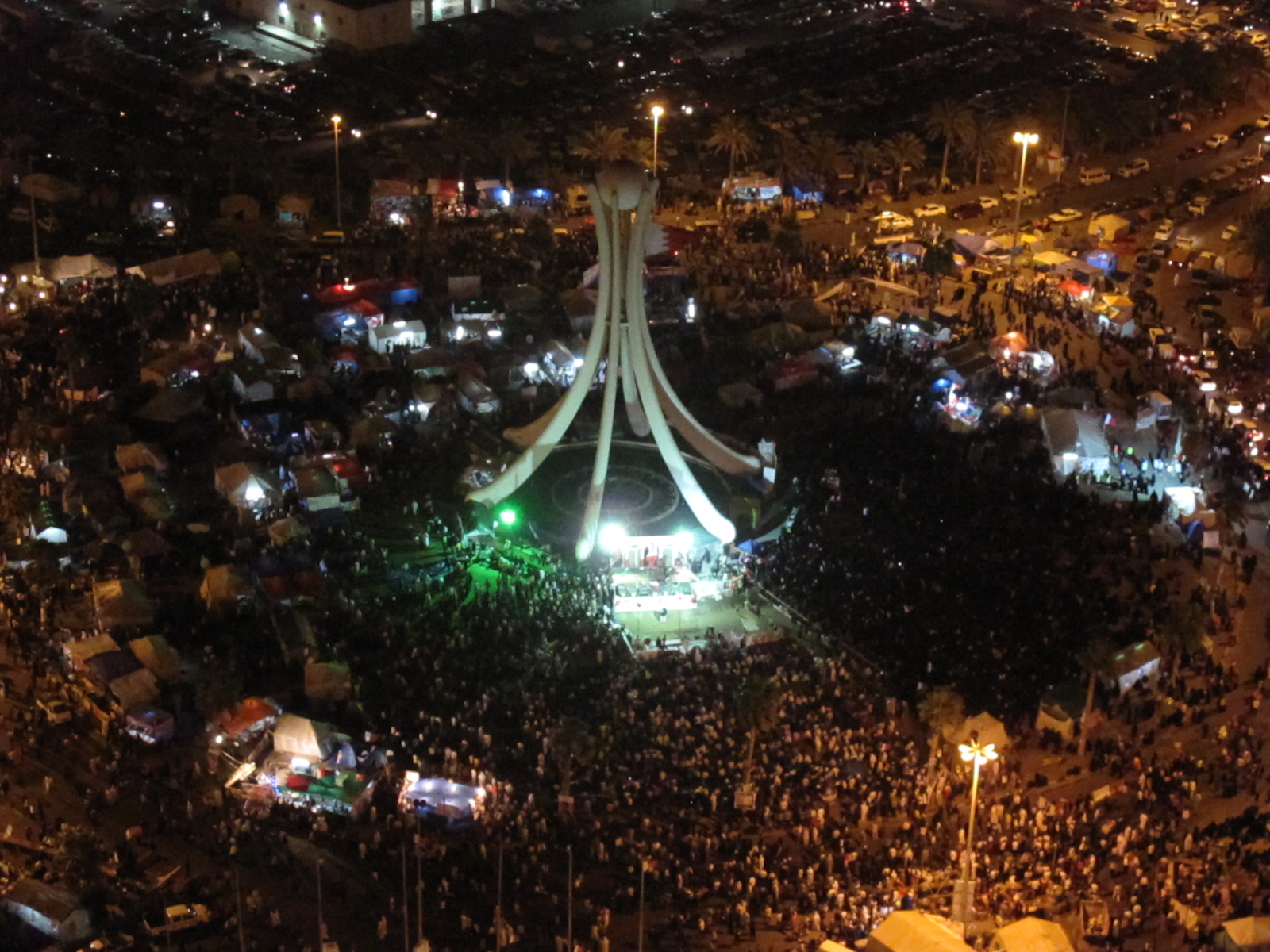
Thousands of demonstrators gather in the Pearl Roundabout on March, 9

External videos
- Thugs attack Bahrain University Students on YouTube

On 6 March, thousands of protesters gathered outside the prime minister's office in Bahrain to demand that he step down, while a government meeting was in progress there. In addition, demonstrators remained in hundreds of tents at Manama's Pearl Roundabout.

On 8 March, three Shiite groups (Haq Movement, Wafa, and the Bahrain Freedom Movement) formed the "Coalition for a Bahraini Republic" and called for the abolishing of the monarchy and the establishing of a democratic republic.

On 9 March, in a protest that began at the Ras Roman mosque, thousands of Shia Bahrainis marched on the immigration office in the capital, Manama, and voiced their opposition towards the granting of citizenship to Sunnis from other countries serving in the country's military. However, in order to emphasise that the protest was against the government's naturalisation policy, and not against Bahrain's native Sunni population, participants also shouted slogans about Sunni-Shia unity.

On 10 March, at a school in Saar, clashes erupted between naturalised Sunni parents – mainly from Syria and Pakistan – and Shia parents, after some Shia pupils launched anti-government protests. In a separate incident, teachers, students and their parents took part in a protest in front of the ministry of education, in Isa Town, demanding the resignation of Dr Majid bin Ali al-Naimi, the education minister.

On 13 March, riot police used tear gas and rubber bullets in an attempt to force a group of hundreds of anti-government protesters from blocking the capital's financial district, where demonstrators have been camped out for more than a week. A video that appeared on YouTube showed one protester being shot with a tear-gas canister at close range. Riot police also encircled demonstrators at Pearl Roundabout, the focal point of protests in Bahrain for nearly a month, firing tear gas canisters, while other protesters staged a number of marches on symbolic targets – the prime minister's office, the foreign ministry, and the state television building, among others. According to testimony collected by Physicians for Human Rights, riot police fired live shotgun ammunition into the crowd and beat protesters with batons and butts of guns. Bahrain's interior ministry said eight police were injured during the operation to disperse protesters, including removing tents. A Pakistani construction worker, Irfan Muhammad suffered serious brain injuries after he was allegedly brutally assaulted and had his tongue cut out by anti-government protesters. A licensed Bahraini nurse reported treating five patients at the Salmaniya Medical Complex for gas inhalation on the night of 13 March. She reported that the patients' symptoms were consistent with nerve gas. A primary care physician at a different hospital reported to Physicians for Human Rights reported that the medical center where she worked treated 26 patients for birdshot wounds and gas inhalation, also on 13 March.

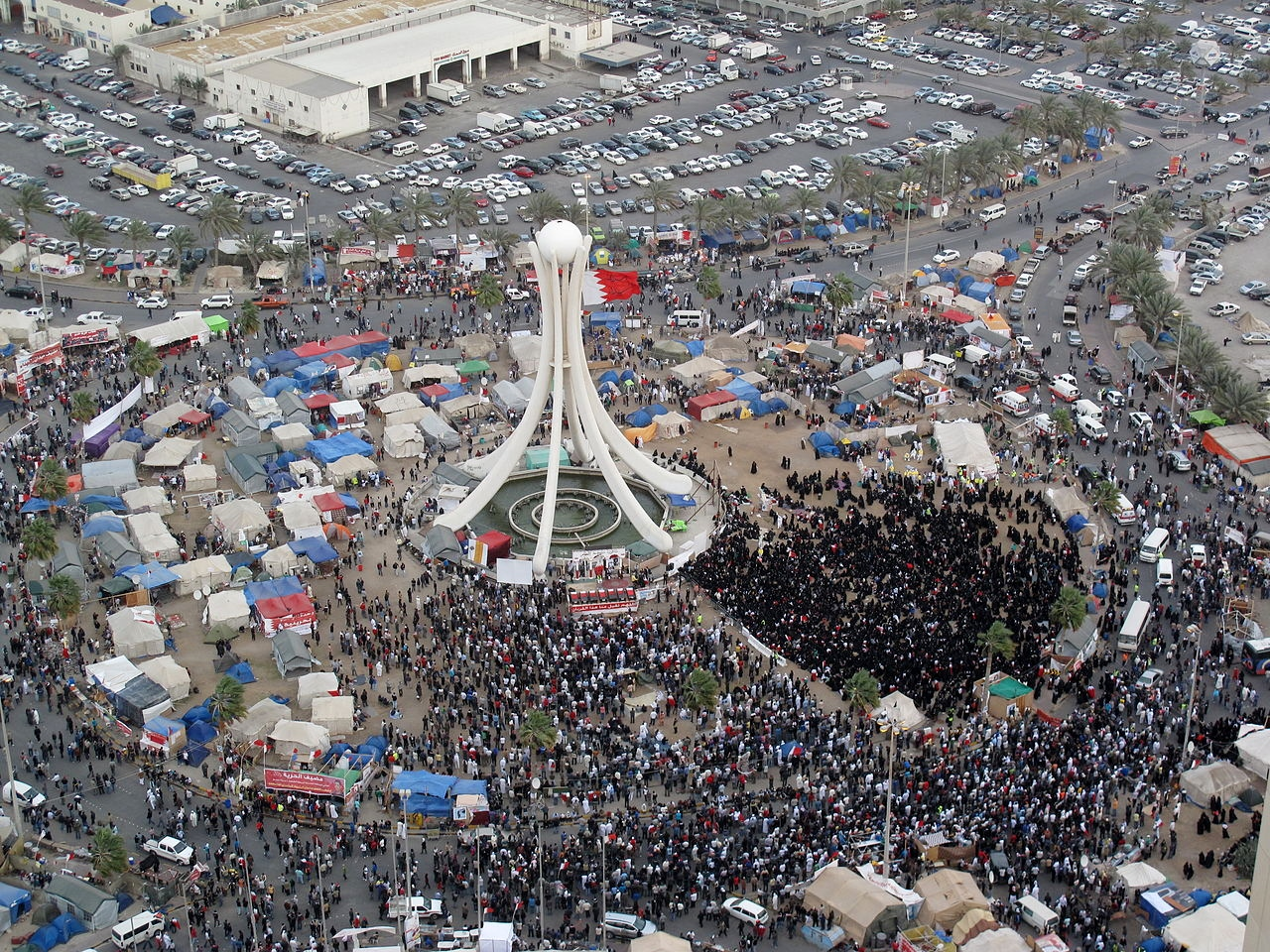
One of the last days of open protest at the Pearl Roundabout on 14 March, the same day that GCC troops entered the country.

On 14 March, the Gulf Co-operation Council (GCC), a six-nation regional grouping which includes Bahrain, Saudi Arabia, Kuwait, Oman, Qatar and the United Arab Emirates agreed to send troops of the Peninsula Shield Force to guard key facilities, such as oil and gas installations and financial institutions, at the request of the Bahraini government. About 4,000 Saudi Arabian troops arrived, to be followed by 500 UAE police. The Saudi troops arrived in around 150 armoured vehicles and 50 other lightly armoured vehicles.

The Bahraini government said that they had requested the troops "to look at ways to help them to defuse the tension in Bahrain.". Some of the Bahraini opposition said this "amounted to an occupation." There was also opposition to the troops arriving only twenty four hours after bloody clashes between the protesters and the police. Other reports claimed the protesting Shi'ite faction called it war, reflecting a split within the opposition. The Crown Prince is holding talks with the opposition about reform. The US has called for restraint, but has made no comment about whether it supports these troops, while Iran has denounced the use of troops from neighbouring Gulf Arab states as "unacceptable", prompting Bahrain to recall its ambassador to Iran in protest at Tehran's "blatant interference" in its internal affairs, according to the state news agency.

On 15 March, the king of Bahrain declared a three-month state of emergency, authorising the nation's armed forces chief to take all measures to "protect the safety of the country and its citizens". Despite this, clashes between anti-government demonstrators and security forces continued, leaving at least two people dead and as many as 200 injured. There were also violent clashes in several mainly Shia areas. In the village of Sitra the police fired on residents. A doctor told the BBC News that soldiers and police were using ambulances to attack people. Britain advised their nationals in Bahrain to leave as soon as possible and promised to help anyone who needed evacuation. "We advise against all travel to Bahrain; we recommend those who do not have a pressing reason to remain should leave by commercial means as soon as it is safe to do so." the British Foreign Office said.

==== 16–17 March ====
External videos
- Protests in Manama, Bahrain, 16 March 2011 on YouTube

Following the deployment of the Peninsula Shield Force, security forces launched a crackdown on protesters at the Pearl Roundabout and elsewhere. Security forces used armored vehicles and helicopters during the operation, and fired tear gas to disperse protesters. Hundreds of protesters were cleared from Pearl Square. Five protesters were killed and dozens wounded during the crackdown.

Many activists were also arrested or re-arrested. The Royal Bahraini Army warned that gatherings should be avoided "for your own safety". The Saudi presence also fueled concerns of further strife over the Sunni-Shia divide.

The following day, Manama was reported to be largely quiet. Shops and malls were still shut as soldiers were stationed throughout the city, including downtown commercial districts and the Bahrain Financial Harbour. Some clashes continued outside Manama in places such as Sitra and Karrana. Salmaniya Hospital also reported that it was running short of medical supplies such as sterilisation equipment and oxygen tanks. Government forces also blocked off the hospital trapping in at least 100 doctors who were unable to leave the premises. Other physicians were forcibly removed and detained. Physicians for Human Rights reported that Bahraini security forces tortured patients in attempt to extract confessions of anti-government activity. One teenage patient, who had been wounded with birdshot and blinded in one eye days before, said that he was stripped naked, photographed, and beaten with the batons of masked security forces. Bahrain TV aired coverage of South Asian expatriate workers being dragged out of an ambulance at the hospital while being assaulted by protesters. At least six people were also reported killed.

Several opposition leaders and activists were arrested overnight, including Hassan Mushaima; Ibrahim Sharif, the head of the Waad political society; and Abdul Jalil al-Singace, a leader of the Haq movement. Mushaima also spoke to Al Jazeera saying: "[Bahraini security forces] should stop killing people. The US especially knows that the people are struggling for democracy in a peaceful way. All the journalists came and saw the people protesting peacefully, and they did not try to use any weapons...and they were only throwing roses." Sheikh Ali Salman, the head of Al Wefaq, said that "the military should withdraw from Bahrain, the military of Saudi Arabia, and this is a call to the Saudi king, King Abdullah."

International bank staff were moved to Dubai amid the unrest. The Bahrain Stock Exchange did not open on 16 March following the state of emergency declaration, however, it reopened the following day as concerns arose of possible headwinds.

Several hundred to a few thousand Saudi protesters in Qatif and nearby towns marched from 15 to 18 March in solidarity with the Bahraini protesters calling for the Peninsula Shield Force to be withdrawn from Bahrain.

Al Arabiya showed a video of medics, who they said were aligned with the protesters, hitting injured ethnic Indian workers who had been hospitalised. According to it, foreign workers were being assaulted by protesters in order to undermine the national economy. Another video showed a group of protesters including some in a vehicle marked with a Red Crescent running over a policeman multiple times.

Physicians for Human Rights received corroborating reports that in the weeks following the start of the protests in February government forces stole at least six ambulances and used them for military purposes, and that police posed as medics in order to get closer to protesters. One eyewitness reported seeing paramedics and ambulance drivers assaulted at Pearl Roundabout on 16 March. The International Committee of the Red Cross responded: "It is totally unacceptable to attack those providing medical care and to obstruct the safe passage of ambulances. All those taking part in the violence must safeguard medical personnel, medical facilities and any vehicle used as an ambulance. Health personnel ... must also be respected and allowed to carry out their life-saving work in safety."

==== 18–20 March ====
External videos
- Bahrain Gov. destroys the Pearl Monument, The Symbol of Bahrain Protests. on YouTube

The Pearl Monument was demolished early on 18 March. The move was read as destroying an important symbol and focal point of the protest movement.

Leading Shia cleric, Sheikh Isa Qassim, said during Friday prayers in Diraz that people were demanding their rights to political reform and that they "do not believe in violence that authorities are trying to push them to." He also backed "the peaceful approach [that] has been our choice since day one." Across Bahrain, thousands of protesters poured out of mosques after Friday prayers to promise to "sacrifice blood for Bahrain" as people gathered to bury Jaafar Mohammed Abdali, a victim of the security forces' bloody crackdown. Doctors in Bahrain said that hospitals were under siege by the military. Some medical staff were given permission to leave the hospital while state television filmed them. The cameras were then switched off and the staff were beaten, while women were threatened with being stripped. A doctor also said that none of the wounded protesters were allowed to be transferred to the hospital from other clinics. Doctors who spoke to the foreign news media were arrested and only a few were still in the hospital

On 20 March, several hundred mourners marched during the funeral procession of Radhi Isa Al Radhiin in the eastern Shia village of Sitra.

In the early hours of the day, Nabeel Rajab, the president of Bahrain Center for Human Rights was briefly detained by dozens of uniformed Bahraini security forces along with 20 to 25 masked men, some armed with rifles. Rajab was subsequently released after questioning in a detention facility run by the Ministry of Interior in Adliya, a suburb of the capital, Manama.

The same day, eighteen former legislators, who resigned in protest against the crackdown, also gathered at the UN offices in Manama to appeal to the UN to stop the violence against protesters and mediate talks between the opposition and the government. They also called on the US to pressure the Saudi-led military force to leave the country. Al Jazeera reported that the main opposition groups had eased conditions for talks with the government a day after the king pledged to bring reforms to end the protests. The largest Shia opposition party, Al Wefaq, also called for the release of all prisoners and asked for an end to the security crackdown and a complete withdrawal of all GCC troops. Hundreds of Saudi Arabians protested in Qatif against the presence of the Peninsula Shield Force in Bahrain. Reuters described the military intervention in Bahrain as having caused the Saudi protests to intensify, reporting an incident in which the second home of a judge calling for street protests to stop was burnt by angry youths.

==== 25 March ====
On 25 March, a "Day of Rage" was planned for nine Bahraini locations, defying the country's emergency rule. The marches were organized by Internet activists and Shia villages across the country, but the mainstream Shia opposition group Wefaq and at least parts of the 14 February Youth Movement, who had organized the earlier Pearl Roundabout protests, were not involved. Meanwhile, the government of Bahrain, after consulting with the Cooperation Council for the Arab States of the Gulf, made a formal complaint to the government of Lebanon about Hezbollah's offer of support to the mainly Shia protesters The police rapidly broke up the protest by using tear gas, rubber bullets and bird shot. According to Al Wefaq, a Bahraini political society, a 71-year-old man died of asphyxiation in his home after police fired tear gas in the village of Ma'ameer.

==== 26 March ====
Some Pakistanis (about 1500) protested against the use of their fellow countrymen being used as mercenaries to halt the revolutionary movement in Bahrain.

==== 27 March ====
On 27 March, Al Wefaq accepted a Kuwaiti offer to mediate in talks with the Bahraini government to end the political crisis. This was also welcomed by the GCC.

Al Wefaq announced that the number of missing persons had reached sixty-six persons, most dating back to after the storming of the security forces in the Pearl Roundabout on 16 March. It also said that the number of detainees was 173 – including five women, two of whom were pregnant – and that security forces raided Sheikh Abdul Jalil al-Miqdad house early on 27 March and arrested him. In addition, Al Wefaq announced that security forces had also arrested Jawad Kadhim Monshed, Abdullah Hassan Al-Hamad, Syed Alwi Al-Alwi, Toufic Al-Kassabm and Hassan Al-Kassab at dawn on 26 March.

==== 28–29 March ====
On 28 March, Bahraini Foreign Minister Khalid ibn Ahmad Al Khalifah denied any Kuwaiti involvement stating, "Any talk about Kuwaiti mediation in Bahrain is completely untrue, there were previous efforts that were not answered, but these were ended by the act of National Safety (martial law)."

On 29 March, Bahrain's parliament accepted the resignations of eleven out of eighteen Al-Wefaq MPs who stepped down in protest at violence against pro-democracy demonstrators. Abduljalil Khalil, Al-Wefaq's leader, also resigned.

==== 30 March ====
Prominent Bahraini blogger Mahmood Al-Yousif was arrested as the protests continued. Human Rights Watch announced that Bahraini authorities were harassing and isolating hospital patients wounded in anti-government protests. "These patients also have been removed from hospitals or forcibly transferred to other medical facilities, often against medical advice. Human Rights Watch has been documenting these cases". BBC News obtained images of police officers cruelly beating unarmed handcuffed protesters.

Ayat Al-Qurmezi, a twenty-year-old poet, was arrested for reciting a poem critical of the government during the pro-democracy protests in Pearl Square, the main gathering place for demonstrators, in February.
