= Death of Abdulredha Buhmaid =

Death during 2011–2012 Bahraini uprising

Abdulredha Mohamed Hasan Buhmaid
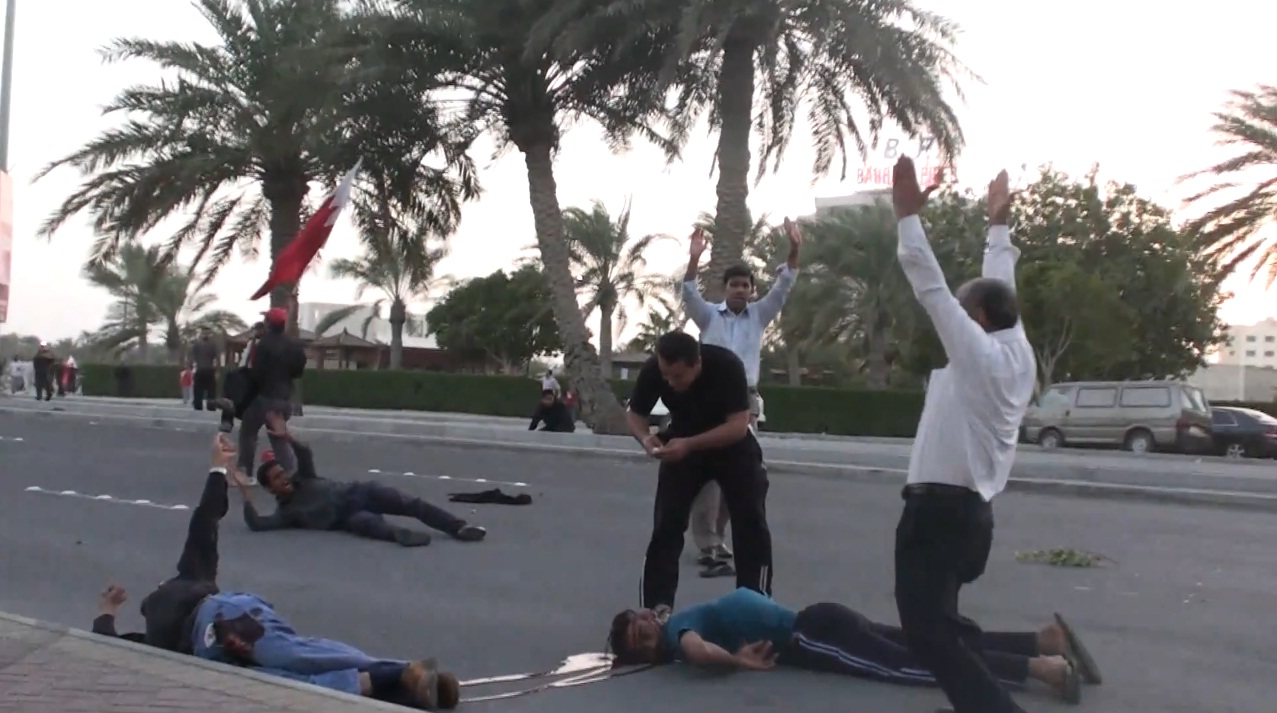
- Buhmaid bleeding on ground after being shot
- Born: عبدالرضا محمد حسن بوحميد; 28 September 1982; Malkiya, Bahrain
- Died: 21 February 2011 (aged 28); Manama, Bahrain
- Cause of death: Gunshot wound
- Resting place: Malkiya, Bahrain
- Known for: being the seventh fatality of the Bahraini uprising (2011), the first to get killed by army forces.

Abdulredha Mohamed Hasan Buhmaid (or Buhamaid, Arabic: عبدالرضا محمد حسن بوحميد) was a 28-year-old Bahraini protester shot by a live bullet in the head on 18 February 2011. He died in hospital three days later, the seventh death in the Bahraini uprising.

Buhmaid was among a group of protesters who on 18 February marched toward the Pearl Roundabout following the funeral procession of protester Ali Abdulhadi Mushaima, who was killed four days earlier. When the protesters neared Pearl Roundabout, the army opened fire. Buhmaid collapsed to the ground, and blood poured from his head after it was hit by a bullet. The army opened fire twice more. Protesters regrouped after each round of shooting. Riot police finally intervened and dispersed protesters. Over one hundred protesters were injured, some seriously. Buhmaid was taken to Salmaniya hospital where attempts to revive him failed over the course of three days. He died on the afternoon of 21 February.

Several witnesses including journalists and medics accused authorities of shooting directly at protesters, preventing some ambulances from reaching the site and firing at others. The government however, denied those statements. It stated that warning shots were fired in the air and accused protesters of faking injuries. An investigation by a government-appointed commission of inquiry blamed the army for Buhmaid's death. The incident marked the first time that the Royal Bahraini Army was used to confront civilians, and at the time was considered "the bloodiest" incident since protests erupted.

Following the incident, the government offered dialogue which the opposition said they will only take part in after the withdrawal of the army. The general labor union called for a general strike. Internationally, the attack on protesters was condemned by Barack Obama and Human Rights Watch. High Representative of European Union expressed her deep concerns and called for restraint and immediate dialogue. Britain revoked over forty arms licenses to Bahrain after an earlier announcement that it would review them and German president canceled a planned visit to the country. Buhmaid is remembered by the opposition as a martyr, leader and symbol of peacefulness.

== Short biography ==
Buhmaid (or Buhamaid, 28) was married and had three children. He lived in Malkiya, south west of Manama. According to his wife, he had strong ties with his brothers. In an interview with the Bahraini newspaper Al Wasat, she said he used to take part in any political event in his area. "He was hoping to be Malkiya's first martyr and so he became", she added.

== Background ==
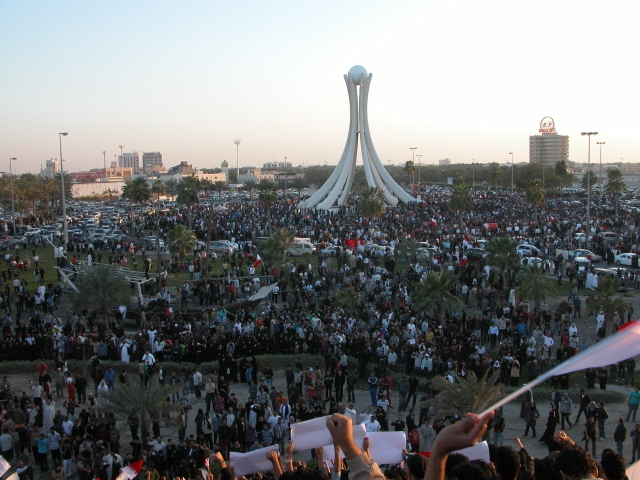
Protesters gather for the first time at Pearl Roundabout on 15 February.

Inspired by the successful uprisings in Egypt and Tunisia, protests erupted in Bahrain on 14 February. During the day named as the Day of Rage, over 6,000 people participated in fifty-five demonstrations and political rallies in twenty-five different locations throughout Bahrain. Security forces responded to protests by firing tear gas, rubber bullets, sound bombs and birdshot. More than thirty protesters were injured and Ali Mushaima died as a result of birdshot injury in his back. The following day, during the deceased's funeral, another protester was killed the same way. Angry protesters marched to and occupied Pearl Roundabout. By nightfall, their numbers had swelled to over 10,000. On 16 February, thousands of protesters continued to occupy Pearl Roundabout.

On 17 February (later referred to as the Bloody Thursday), police launched a pre-dawn raid on sleeping protesters. Four protesters were killed and more than 300 were injured bringing the number of those killed in the events to six. Health workers and a journalist were allegedly attacked by security forces. The army was deployed following clearance of Pearl roundabout which then set up checkpoints and barriers. The Interior Ministry issued a warning to stay off the streets, and the army warned that it was ready to take "punitive measures" to restore order. Protesters resorted to Salmaniya Hospital's car parks where thousands of them protested against the government. All 18 Members of Parliament from Al Wefaq, the only opposition political party represented in Parliament, submitted their resignations.

== Incident ==
Video of the shooting went "viral", with more than two million views in the space of a week.

External media

Images
- Buhmaid undergoing a surgery in Salmaniya hospital.

Video
- Montage of clips of shooting filmed from behind BDF lines on YouTube

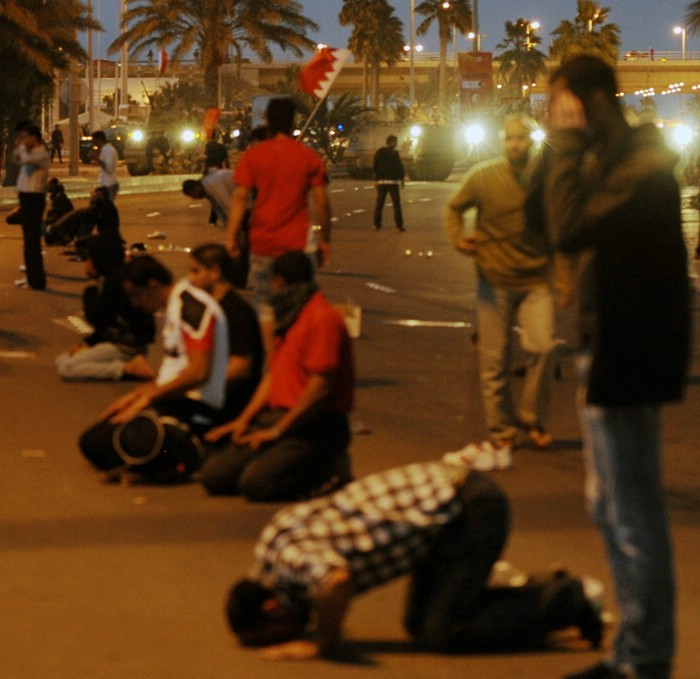
Protesters performing Maghrib prayer in front of the army.

On 18 February, over 50,000 participated in the funerals of crackdown victims. One was held in Al Daih, another in Karzakan. The largest however, was in Sitra. At about 4:46 in the afternoon, about a thousand protesters, most of them young men who participated in Al Daih funeral of Ali Abdulhadi Mushaima marched toward Manama, defying the government ban on gatherings. By 5:18 they had reached a road junction; to the right was Salmaniya hospital and to the left Pearl Roundabout. They turned left after a short pause. On their way, they clashed with riot police who withdrew from the site. Protesters continued their march removing barriers set by police a day ago.

By 5:30 protesters were 80 to 200 meters away from army forces stationed in Pearl Roundabout which "were armed with M16 assault rifles, Dilmun rifles and Browning .50 calibre machine guns mounted on top of armoured vehicles". The protest was peaceful and protesters were "holding their hands in the air and chanting 'peaceful, peaceful'". Some were holding flowers. As protesters continued marching, army troops opened fire.

Abdulredha Buhmaid was among the protesters. He was shot by a bullet in the head, collapsed to the ground and in the words of a witness, "blood was rushing from his head". Others sustained severe injuries inflicted by gunshots, two of whom also fell to the ground. Several eyewitnesses said army troops "gave no warning", but one witness said he heard them issue a warning several minutes after the initial shooting. Another witness said they heard a "faint voice of someone over a loudspeaker in the distance but could not make out what the speaker was saying".

Most protesters ran after hearing gunshots and a helicopter chased them. After shooting stopped, protesters regrouped. One youth picked a rock and headed toward the army, only to be stopped by four other protesters. A witness interviewed by Physicians for Human Rights said that he and other protesters moved closer to army forces following the initial shooting. According to him he asked "Why do you shoot us? We had our hands up. We are peaceful. What do you want from us?", one soldier replied "I want you to leave. If you do not turn back, I have orders to shoot". Arriving ambulances started evacuating the injured when army opened fire again.

When the shooting stopped, about fifty protesters started praying on the road, and few stood in front facing the army with their hands in the air. The army opened fire for a third time. The period of each shooting was short, because "people immediately started running away", witnesses said. After that, riot police intervened, firing tear gas and birdshot to disperse protesters, inflicting more injuries among them.

A cameraman working for the Associated Press said he saw "army units shooting anti-aircraft weapons, fitted on top of armored personnel carriers, above the protesters in apparent warning shots and attempts to drive them back from security cordons". Bahraini photojournalist Mazen Mahdi said that the army shot "live fire from machine guns" and that paramedics were blocked from helping the wounded. "The first was a warning shot in the air. But after that, they just opened fire at the people ... They shot at the ambulances when they came in", he added.

A senior emergencies researcher and medics interviewed by Human Rights Watch confirmed that some of the twelve ambulances sent were prevented by security forces from reaching the site. The Daily Telegraph said ambulances and paramedics "were shot at" and that "several were detained and at least one ambulance was impounded". Michael Slackman of The New York Times reported that he and a colleague were "shot at from a helicopter" shortly after army opened fire on protesters. Associated Press witnesses, The Daily Telegraph, and The New York Times mentioned that army personnel positioned in high buildings and helicopters fired on protesters. Jalal Firooz, resigned MP of Al Wefaq, Bahrain's main opposition party, said he saw soldiers fire on protesters. A report by three local rights groups mentioned that "photos of the injuries suggest that army aimed at the upper body area".

Riot police chased down protesters who fled to Salmaniya, Bahrain's main hospital. Security forces backed off after initially advancing toward the hospital and firing tear gas into it. That night, over seven thousand protesters staged an anti-government sit-in in hospital parks, described by The Guardian as "the only place in Manama where they now feel safe to gather in numbers". The incident marked the first time that the Royal Bahraini Army was used to confront civilians, and at the time was considered "the bloodiest" incident since protests erupted.

=== Casualties ===
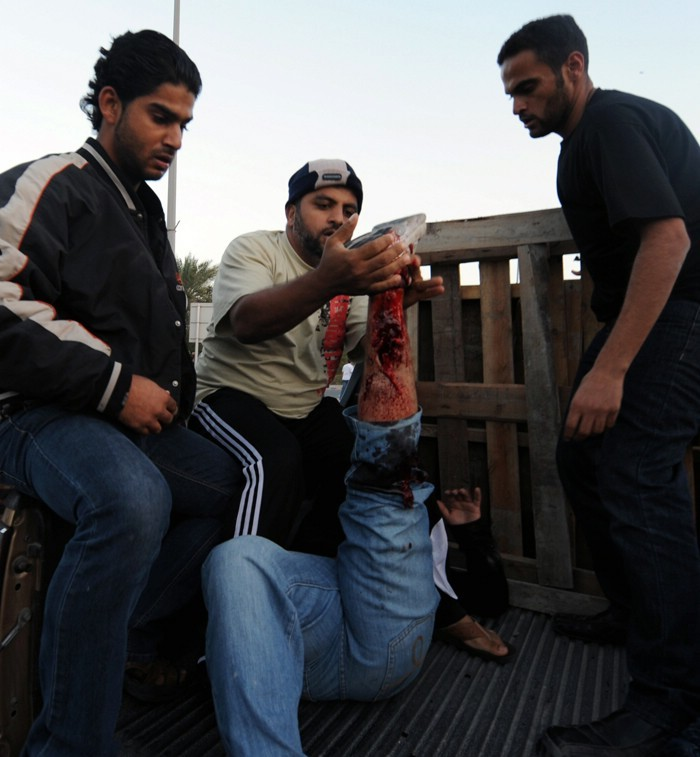
Protester injured in his leg being carried in a civilian car

At least 120 people were injured according to medical officials. Salmaniya hospital was "overwhelmed" with casualties, some of whom were taken to private hospitals. Doctors said that nine of the thirty-two casualties who reached Salmaniya hospital were in critical condition. Some medics cried while treating the injured, some of whom had bullets still lodged into their bodies, X-rays showed. A doctor interviewed by Al Jazeera English pleaded for help from "all countries in the world". Describing the situation in hospital as a war, Dr. Ghassan said, "They are shooting at people's heads. Not at the legs. People are having their brains blown out". Two doctors said they treated patients who "seemed to be [injured by] live bullets rather than shotgun pellets, judging by the entry and exit holes".

Buhmaid was taken to Salmaniya hospital. Blood was still "pouring from his head and he was unconscious". He was "clinging to life" in intensive care unit where doctors "struggled to stop his bleeding". "This is a bullet, gunshot wound, direct to his head and he's bleeding profusely from his nose, from his ear, his brain is shattered into pieces", said a doctor. Buhmaid's "brain was destroyed, but his body was still alive". His clinical death prompted a nurse on 20 February to smash a glass-framed image of the Prime Minister. Remaining in ICU for three days, Buhmaid was medically declared to be dead early in the afternoon of 21 February, becoming the seventh victim of the uprising.

Listing him under "Deaths Attributed to Security Forces", the Bahrain Independent Commission of Inquiry appointed by King Hamad to investigate the events stated that Buhmaid's death "may be attributed to the BDF [army]" while also referring to the contrary result of the military investigation.

=== Government account ===
On the night of 18 February, Fasial al-Hamar, then the Minister of Health, issued a press release aired on the national TV which denied there had been any deaths. He said the situation at Salmaniya hospital was calm and that only seven people were being treated for minor injuries. He also warned against what he called "rumors" spread in some satellite channels and websites. Bahrain's ambassador to the United States said that if army forces did fire live ammunition, "Probably they were warning shots only". "The forces that were used were proportional according to the law, they were legal, they were necessary because they were stopping the shops. The economy was hurting, the national economy. We had to take action and action was taken by the law," he added. However he admitted protesters did not use live rounds and promised that "Investigations will happen. And they will continue".

The army said that protesters defied its orders to evacuate the area. According to its statement, after at least fifteen minutes of repeating the same orders, soldiers fired warning shots to the air. It also alleged that protesters were accompanied by "a line of ambulances" out of which they took blood bags to "feign that they had been injured". Military prosecutors carried out an investigation and concluded that the trajectory of the bullet that killed Buhmaid were inconsistent with the bullet having been shot by the BDF, on the basis of an ordnance expert's report that concluded the shot was fired from a high elevation.

== Aftermath ==
Following the incident, the government offered dialogue with opposition and ordered army to withdraw from Pearl Roundabout. On 19 February, army troops were replaced by riot police. Hundreds of protesters moved to the site from different locations. A standoff between protesters and riot police was created, until the latter suddenly moved away. Thousands of protesters re-occupied the site following police withdrawal.

=== Funeral ===
Buhmaid's funeral was held on 22 February in his village, Malkiya. Over 9,000 participated in the funeral procession which started from roundabout 13 in Hamad Town and ended in Malkiya graveyard. At the same day during afternoon, over 100,000 participated in a protest dubbed "March of loyalty to martyrs" in honor of the seven victims of the uprising.

=== Medics' trial ===
In May 2011, 47 doctors, nurses, and dentists were charged for their actions during the uprising. One of the charges was conducting unnecessary operations to Buhmaid, which led to his death. In a press conference, Minister of Justice said "Buhmaid was shot in the head and he underwent a surgery in the presence of the media. His head had been open in an exaggerated manner, which led to his death".

== Reactions ==
=== Domestic ===
Buhmaid's family said they were sad for his death, but their pride had overcome it. Appearing on the national TV, the crown prince authorized by his father, the king, offered unconditional dialogue with opposition. He offered "condolences to the people of Bahrain for the painful days they are living" and asked them to remain calm. Opposition activists demanded withdrawal of army and resignation of government for the dialogue to begin. "[There is no] serious will for dialogue because the military is in the streets", said Matar Matar, resigned MP of Al Wefaq. The general labor union called for an indefinite general strike "unless the army is pulled out from the streets and peaceful demonstrations are permitted".

=== International ===
Barack Obama criticized the government actions. In reference to government of Bahrain and Yemen, he said "The United States condemns the use of violence by governments against peaceful protesters in those countries and wherever else it may occur". Catherine Ashton, the High Representative of European Union demanded "restraint" from all parties and said that report of violence "deeply concerned" her. She called for dialogue to begin "without delay". The United Kingdom revoked forty four arm licenses to Bahrain, twenty of them open licenses. Foreign Office Minister Alistair Burt said "We are deeply concerned about the situation in Bahrain and the events which have led to the deaths of several protesters".

German president canceled a planned trip to the country. "Freedom of assembly and freedom of speech in Bahrain have to be fully guaranteed", a spokesman quoted him saying. Lawrence Cannon, then Canada's Foreign Minister called the Bahraini government to "exercise restraint" and launch an investigation into protesters' deaths. "Canada urges Bahrain to respect its citizens' rights to freedom of expression and assembly, and to engage in peaceful dialogue with its people to address their concerns", he added.

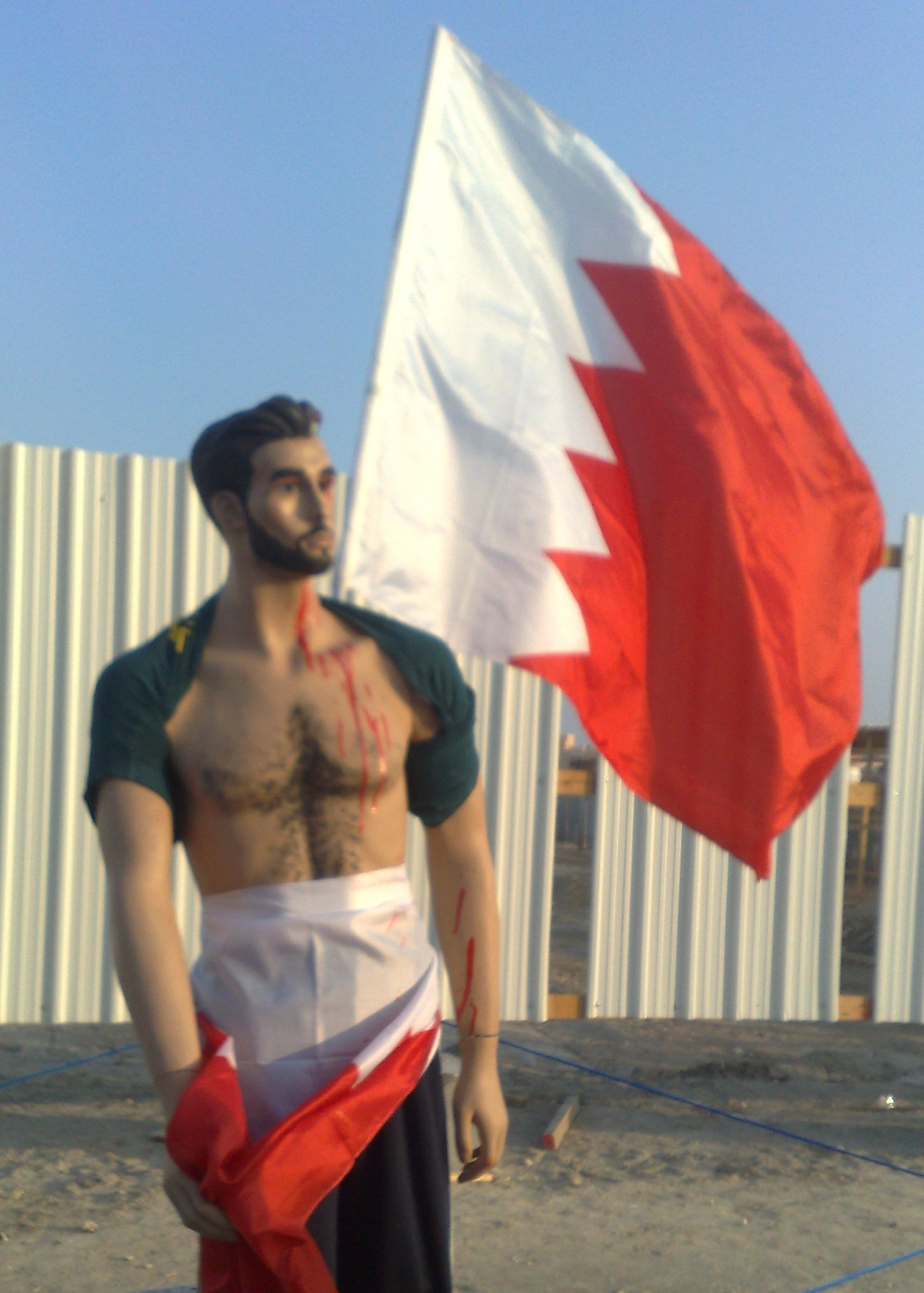
Memorial for Buhmaid

Human Rights Watch condemned the attack. "The Bahraini army has done what the Egyptian army did not do and exactly what the United States and its other partners urged it not to do -- it has opened fire on its own people," its Washington director said. Fareed Zakaria, CNN's international affairs analyst, said that the crackdown on protesters was a "rash move that will enrage many of its people and cost the regime international prestige". "This is a terrible mistake and they will pay a heavy price for it. The regime in Bahrain is doing something very rash and unwise; it is trying to respond by using force and punitive measures. This is not going to work in the end", he added.

== Legacy ==
Buhmaid was the first person named a "field commander" by February 14 Youth Coalition, which also named their attempt to reoccupy Pearl Roundabout in the first anniversary of the uprising, "operation of the martyr leader Abdulredha Buhmaid". His death was described by the online opposition newspaper, Bahrain Mirror, as a "legendary scene that will remain forever in the conscience of humanity". A poster found in two articles of the aforementioned newspaper described Buhmaid as "the martyr who brought down an army with his peacefulness".

Speaking to participants of a sit-in front of United Nations building in Manama on 22 February 2012, Ahlam al-Khuza'e of Al Wefaq said that shooting scene of Buhmaid was "the top manifestation of peacefulness". On 29 February, opposition parties organized a gathering in Malkiya to honor Buhmaid. Thousands participated in the gathering including Isa Qassim, Bahrain Shias' top religious figure.

== See also ==
- Timeline of the Bahraini uprising (February–March 2011)
