= Day of Rage (Bahrain) =

Name given by protesters in Bahrain to a day in the Arab Spring

- Part of the Bahraini uprising
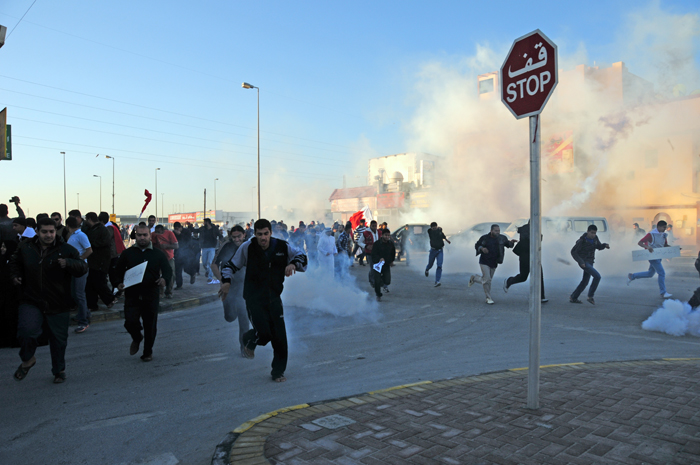
- Protesters fleeing after security forces fired tear gas on a march in Nuwaidrat.
- Date: 14 February 2011
- Location: Bahrain; 26°13′3″N 50°34′12″E
- Caused by: Discrimination against Shias, unemployment, slow pace of democratisation and inspiration from concurrent regional protests.
- Goals: Democracy, a rewrite of the Constitution, the resignation of the prime minister, and an end to alleged economic and human rights violations.
- Methods: Civil resistance and Demonstrations

Parties
Protesters	Government of Bahrain

Lead figures
	Public Security Forces

Number
Over six thousand	Hundreds

Casualties and losses
One dead and thirty injured	Three injured (according to Ministry of Interior)

The Day of Rage (Arabic: يوم الغضب, romanized: Yawm al-Ghaḍab) is the name given by protesters in Bahrain to 14 February 2011, the first day of the national uprising as part of the Arab Spring. Inspired by successful uprisings in Egypt and in Tunisia, Bahraini youth organised protests using social-media websites. They appealed to the Bahraini people "to take to the streets on Monday 14 February in a peaceful and orderly manner". The day had a symbolic value, being the ninth and tenth anniversaries of the country's 2002 constitution and the National Action Charter respectively.

Some opposition parties supported the protests' plans, while others did not explicitly call for demonstration. However, they demanded deep reforms and changes similar to those by the youth. Before the start of protests, the cabinet of Bahrain had introduced a number of economic and political concessions. The protests started with a sit-in in solidarity with the Egyptian Revolution of 2011 in the vicinity of the Egyptian embassy in the capital Manama ten days before the Day of Rage. On the eve of 14 February, security forces dispersed hundreds of protesters south of Manama.

On 14 February, thousands of Bahrainis participated in 55 marches in 25 locations throughout Bahrain. Protests were peaceful and protesters demanded deep reforms. The earliest demonstration started at 5:30 a.m. in Nuwaidrat, and the last took place just minutes before midnight in the vicinity of Salmaniya Medical Complex heading to the Pearl Roundabout. The largest was on the island of Sitra. Security forces responded to protests by firing tear gas, rubber bullets, stun grenades and birdshot. More than 30 protesters were injured and one was killed by birdshot. The Bahraini Ministry of Interior said a number of security forces were injured after groups of protesters attacked them.

== Background ==
Bahrain is a tiny island nation in the Persian Gulf that hosts the United States Naval Support Activity Bahrain, the home of the US Fifth Fleet; the US Department of Defense considers the location critical for its ability to counter Iranian military power in the region. The Saudi Arabian government and other Gulf region governments strongly support the King of Bahrain. Although government officials and media often accuse the opposition of being influenced by Iran, a government-appointed commission found no evidence supporting the claim. Iran has historically claimed Bahrain as a province, but the claim was dropped after a UN 1970 survey found that most Bahraini people preferred independence over Iranian control.

=== Modern political history ===
Bahrainis have protested sporadically throughout the last decades, demanding social, economic, and political reforms. In the 1950s, following sectarian clashes, the National Union Committee was formed by reformists; it demanded an elected popular assembly and carried out protests and general strikes. In 1965, a month-long uprising broke out after hundreds of workers at Bahrain Petroleum Company were laid off. Bahrain became independent from Britain in 1971 and the country had its first parliamentary election in 1973. Two years later, the government proposed a law called the "State Security Law" giving police wide arresting powers and allowing individuals to be held in prison without trial for up to three years. The assembly rejected the law, prompting the Isa bin Salman Al Khalifa, then the Emir, to dissolve it and suspend the constitution. It was not until 2002 that Bahrain held any parliamentary elections, after protests and violence between 1994 and 2001.

=== Economy ===
Despite its oil-rich Gulf neighbors, Bahrain's oil, discovered in 1932, has "virtually dried up" making it poorer than other countries in its region. In recent decades, Bahrain has moved towards banking and tourism, making it one of the most important financial hubs in the region; it has since held some of the top international rankings in economic freedom and business-friendly countries, making it, as of 2012, the freest economy in the Middle East, according to the 2012 Index of Economic Freedom, published by The Heritage Foundation and The Wall Street Journal.

However, Bahrainis suffer from relative poverty. Semi-official studies found that the poverty threshold (the minimum level of income deemed adequate in a given country.) in the country in 1995 was .د.ب 308. The Bahrain Centre for Human Rights said that by 2007, it had increased to .د.ب 400 at least, putting half of Bahrainis under the poverty line. In 2008, the government rejected the UN's conclusion that 2% of Bahrainis lived in "slum-like conditions". Poor families receive monthly financial support. In 2007, CNN produced a documentary titled "Poverty in Bahrain", which was criticized by pro-government newspaper, Gulf Daily News. Al Jazeera produced a similar documentary in 2010.

The unemployment rate in Bahrain is among the highest in GCC countries. Sources close to the government estimated it between 3.7% and 5.4%, while other sources said it was as high as 15%. Unemployment was especially widespread among youth and the Shia community. Bahrain also suffers from a "housing problem" with the number of housing applications reaching about 53,000 in 2010. These conditions prompted the Bahrain Youth Society for Human Rights to consider housing one of the most important problems in Bahrain.

=== Human rights ===
Human rights in Bahrain improved after the government introduced reform plans in 1999–2002 but declined again in subsequent years. Between 2007 and 2011, Bahrain's international rankings fell 21 places from number 123 to 144 on the Democracy Index, as ranked by the Economist Intelligence Unit. The Freedom in the World index on political freedom classified Bahrain as "Not Free" in 2010–2011. A Freedom House "Freedom on the Net" survey classified "Net status" as "Not free" and noted that more than 1,000 websites were blocked in Bahrain. The Press Freedom Index (by Reporters Without Borders) declined significantly: in 2002, Bahrain was ranked number 67 and by 2010, it had fallen to number 144. The Freedom of the Press report (by Freedom House) classified Bahrain in 2011 as "Not Free". Human Rights Watch has described Bahrain's record on human rights as "dismal", and having "deteriorated sharply in the latter half of 2010".

==== Torture ====
During the period between 1975 and 1999 known as the "State Security Law Era", the Bahraini government frequently used torture, which resulted in a number of deaths. After the Emir Hamad bin Isa Al Khalifa succeeded his father, Isa bin Salman Al Khalifa in 1999, reports of torture declined dramatically and conditions of detention improved. However, Royal Decree 56 of 2002 gave effective immunity to all those accused of torture during the uprising in the 1990s and before (including notorious figures such as Ian Henderson and Adel Flaifel.). Towards the end of 2007, the government began employing torture again and by 2010, its use had become common again.

==== Shia grievances ====
The Shia majority ruled by the Sunni House of Khalifa since the eighteenth century have long complained of what they call systemic discrimination. They are blocked from serving in important political and military posts and the government has reportedly naturalized Sunnis originally from Pakistan and Syria in what Shia say is an attempt to increase the percentage of Sunnis in the population.

According to Khalil al-Marzooq of Al Wefaq, the number of those granted Bahraini nationality between 2001 and 2008 is 68 thousand. According to al-Marzooq, this number was calculated using official estimates by subtracting the population in 2001 (405,000) and natural increase (65,000) from the population in 2008 (537,000). In a rally against "political naturalization", Sunni opposition activist Ibrahim Sharif estimated that 100,000 were naturalized by 2010 and thus comprised 20% of Bahraini citizens. The government rejected accusations of undertaking any "sectarian naturalization policy". Shia grievances were exacerbated when in 2006 Salah Al Bandar, then an adviser to the Cabinet Affairs Ministry, revealed an alleged political conspiracy aiming to disenfranchise and marginalize Shias, who comprise about 60% of the population.

==== 2010 crackdown ====
In August 2010, authorities launched a two-month-long crackdown, referred to as the Manama incident, arresting hundreds of opposition activists, most of whom were members of the Shia organizations Haq Movement and Al Wafa' Islamic party, in addition to human rights activists. The arrestees were accused of forming a "terrorist network" aiming to overthrow the government. However, a month later Al Wefaq opposition party, which was not targeted by the crackdown, won a plurality in the parliamentary election.

== Calls for a revolution ==
A Facebook page calling for a popular revolution on 14 February.

Inspired by the successful uprisings in Egypt and Tunisia, opposition activists began in January to post on a large scale to the social media websites Facebook and Twitter and online forums, and to send e-mails and text messages with calls to stage major pro-democracy protests. The Bahraini government blocked a Facebook page which had 14,000 "likes" calling for a revolution and a "day of rage" on 14 February; however the "likes" had risen to 22,000 few days later. Another online group called "The Youth of the February 14th Revolution" described itself as "unaffiliated with any political movement or organisation" and rejected any "religious, sectarian or ideological bases" for their demands. They issued a statement listing a number of demands and steps it said were unavoidable in order to achieve "change and radical reforms".

Bahraini youths described their plans as an appeal for Bahrainis "to take to the streets on Monday 14 February in a peaceful and orderly manner in order to rewrite the constitution and to establish a body with a full popular mandate to investigate and hold to account economic, political, and social violations, including stolen public wealth, political naturalisation, arrests, torture and other oppressive security measures, [and] institutional and economic corruption." One of the main demands was resignation of the king's uncle, Prince Khalifa bin Salman Al Khalifa from his post as prime minister. He had been the unelected prime minister of Bahrain since 1971, making him the world's longest serving prime minister.

The day had a symbolic value; it was the tenth anniversary of a referendum in favor of the National Action Charter which had promised to introduce democratic reforms following the 1990s uprising. It was also the ninth anniversary of the Constitution of 2002, which had made opposition feel "betrayed" by the king. The Constitution had brought some promised reforms, such as an elected parliament; however opposition activists said it went back on reform plans, giving the king the power to appoint half the parliamentary seats and withholding power from parliament to elect the prime minister.

Unregistered opposition parties such as Haq Movement and Bahrain Freedom Movement supported the plans. The National Democratic Action Society only announced a day before the protests that it supported "the principle of the right of the youth to demonstrate peacefully". Other opposition groups including Al Wefaq, Bahrain's main opposition party, did not explicitly call for or support protests; however Al Wefaq leader Ali Salman did demand political reforms.

== Events leading to the protests ==
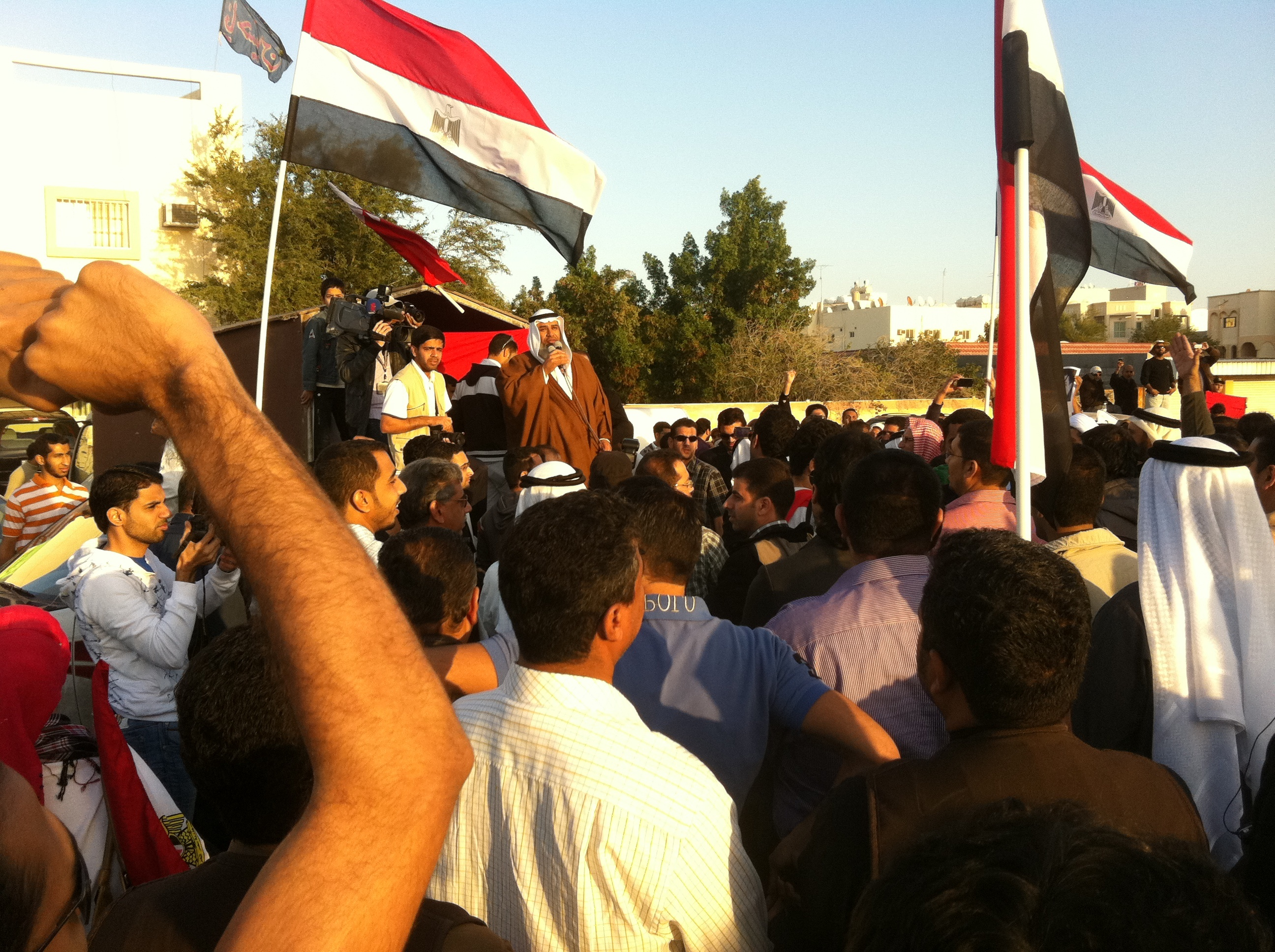
Bahrainis rallying in support of the Egyptian Revolution of 2011 on 4 February.

A few weeks before the protests, the Cabinet of Bahrain made a number of concessions, including increasing social spending and offering to free some of the minors arrested in the Manama incident in August. On 4 February, several hundred Bahrainis gathered in front of the Egyptian embassy in Manama to express support for anti-government protesters there. According to The Wall Street Journal, this was "one of the first such gatherings to be held in the oil-rich Persian Gulf states." At the gathering, Ibrahim Sharif, the secretary-general of the National Democratic Action Society (Wa'ad), called for "local reform."

On 11 February, hundreds of Bahrainis and Egyptians took to the streets near the Egyptian embassy in Manama to celebrate the fall of Egypt's president Hosni Mubarak following the successful Egyptian Revolution of 2011. Security forces reacted swiftly to contain the crowd by setting a number of roadblocks. In the Khutbah preceding Friday prayer, Shiekh Isa Qassim, a leading Shia cleric, said "the winds of change in the Arab world [are] unstoppable". He demanded an end to torture and discrimination, the release of political activists and a rewriting of the constitution.

Appearing on the state media, king Hamad announced that each family would be given 1,000 Bahraini dinars ($2,650) to celebrate the tenth anniversary of the National Action Charter referendum. Agence France-Presse linked payments to the 14 February demonstration plans.

The next day, the Bahrain Centre for Human Rights sent an open letter to the king urging him to avoid a "worst-case scenario" by introducing a wide range of reforms, including "releasing more than 450 detainees including [Bahraini] human rights defenders, religious figures and more than 110 children, dissolv[ing] the security apparatus and prosecut[ing] its official[s] responsible [for] violations". At night, residents of Jidhafs held a public dinner banquet to celebrate the fall of Egypt's president.

On 13 February, authorities set up a number of checkpoints and increased the presence of security forces in key locations such as shopping malls. Al Jazeera interpreted the move as "a clear warning against holding Monday's [14 February] rally". At night, police fired tear gas and rubber bullets on a small group of youths who organized a protest in Karzakan after a wedding ceremony. According to a photographer working for the Associated Press, several people were injured and others suffered from the effects of tear gas. Bahrain's Ministry of Interior said that about 100 individuals who gathered in an unauthorized rally in the village attacked security forces, injuring three policemen, and that police responded by firing two rubber bullets, one of which rebounded from the ground, injuring a protester. Small protests and clashes occurred in other locations as well, such as Sabah Al Salem, Sitra, Bani Jamra and Tashan, leading to minor injuries among both protesters and security forces.

== 14 February ==
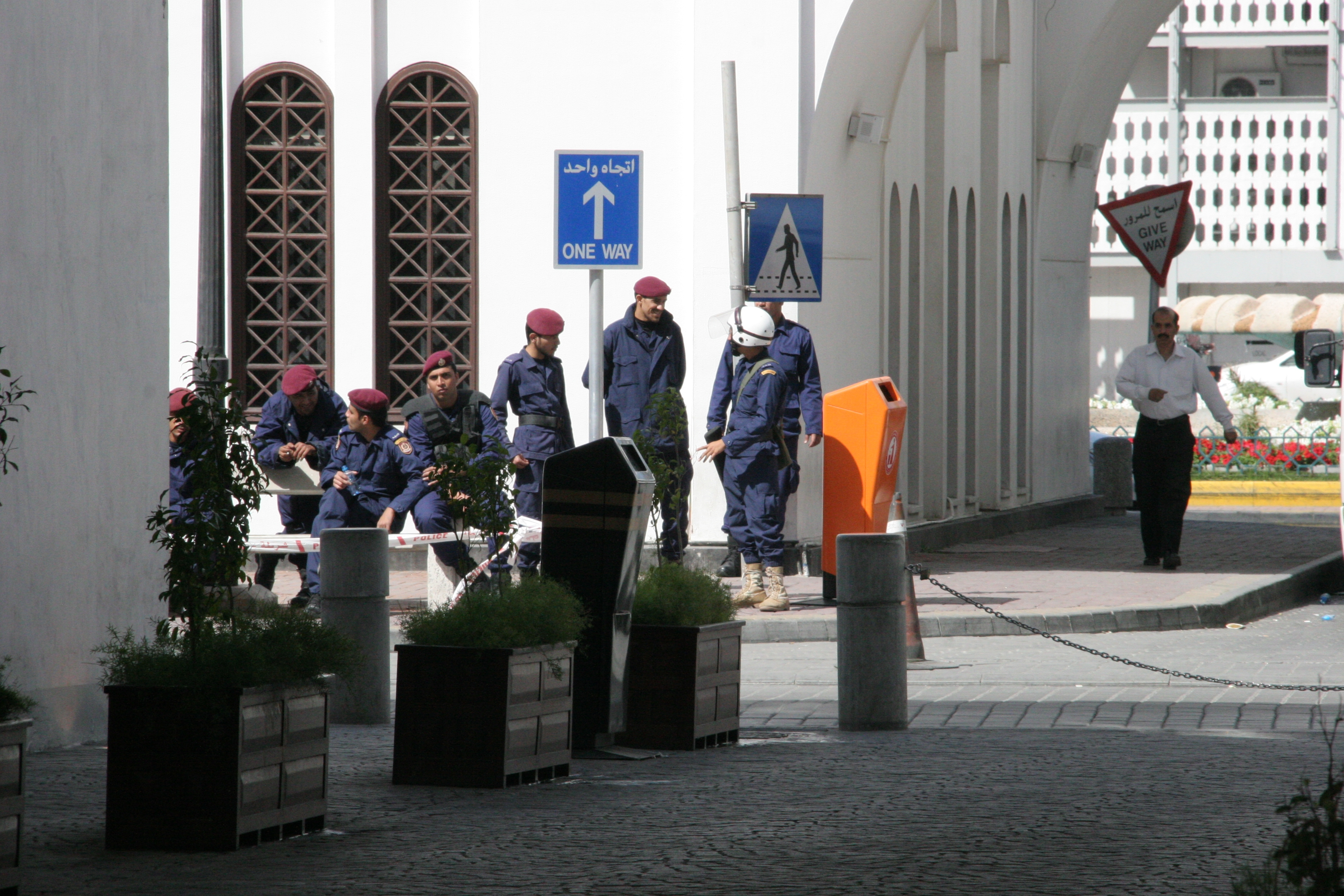
Police presence in Bab Al Bahrain.

Over 6,000 people participated in 55 demonstrations and political rallies in 25 different locations throughout Bahrain. Helicopters hovered over areas where marches were due to take place and the presence of security forces was heavy in a number of key locations such as the Central Business District, shopping malls and Bab Al Bahrain. The traffic directorate closed a number of roads such as those leading to Pearl Roundabout, Dana mall, Al Daih and parts of Budaiya highway in order to anticipate any non-permitted protests. Throughout the day and especially in the evening, Internet speed was much slower than usual. According to Bikya Masr blog, "many people" linked this to government attempts to contain the protests.

The demonstrators demanded the release of detained protesters, socio-economic and political reforms and constitutional monarchy. Protesters sought no permits, although it is required by Bahraini law. The Bahraini newspaper Al Wasat reported that protests were peaceful and that demonstrators did not throw stones at security forces or burn tires in streets, unlike previous protests.

Police dispersed demonstrations such as this one in Diraz.

The earliest demonstration was recorded at 05:30 in the mainly Shia village of Nuwaidrat, where 300 people are said to have participated. The rally was led by Shia political activist Abdulwahhab Hussain. Police dispersed this rally, resulting in some injuries, and the hospitalization of one demonstrator. Police continued to disperse rallies throughout the day with tear gas, rubber bullets, and shotguns, causing additional injuries, and hospitalizing three more demonstrators.

One major demonstration took place in the Shi'a island of Sitra, where several thousand men, women, and children took to the streets. According to witnesses interviewed by Physicians for Human Rights, hundreds of fully armed riot police arrived on the scene and immediately began firing tear gas and sound grenades into the crowds. They then fired rubber bullets into the unarmed crowd, aiming at people in the front line who had sat down in the street in protest.

In Sanabis, security forces fled the location after protesters approached them, leaving one of their vehicles behind. Instead of damaging or burning the vehicle, protesters attached the flag of Bahrain to it. In Sehla, hundreds of people offered maghrib prayer in the streets after staging a march. In Bilad Al Qadeem, protesters held a sit-in in the afternoon and started marching in the evening, after which security forces intervened to disperse them. In Karzakan, protesters staged a march that was joined by another march starting in Dumistan and ended peacefully. In Duraz security forces fired tear gas on 100 protesters, breaking up their rally.

On its Twitter account, the Ministry of Interior said that six masked individuals participating in a march in Jidhafs had attacked security forces. They wrote that police had responded, injuring the legs and back of one of the attackers.

=== Casualties ===
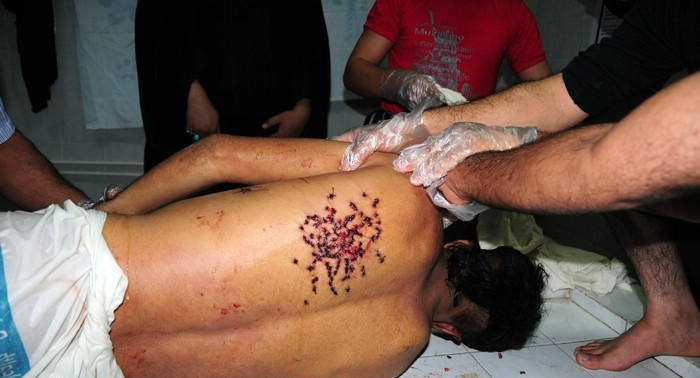
Police fired birdshot at Ali Mushaima's back from close range.

In the evening of 14 February, Ali Mushaima died from police shotgun wounds to his back at close range. The government says that Ali was part of a group of 800 protesters that attacked eight policemen with rocks and metal rods. The government asserts that the police exhausted their supply of tear gas and rubber bullets in a failed attempt to disperse the crowd, and resorted to the use of shotguns. Witnesses say that there were no demonstrations at the time Ali was shot. They say Ali was seen walking with a group of officers who were pointing their guns at him. As Ali walked away, he was shot in the back by one of the officers. The Ministry of Interior expressed its regret at the incident and announced that the death would be investigated.

Later, several hundred demonstrators congregated in the car park of the hospital where Ali was taken. They staged a protest outside the hospital heading to the Pearl Roundabout; meanwhile another march was heading to the same location from King Faisal Highway. Security forces intervened, injuring some protesters and arresting 24. By the end of the day, more than 30 protesters had been injured, mostly by birdshot and rubber bullets.

== Aftermath ==
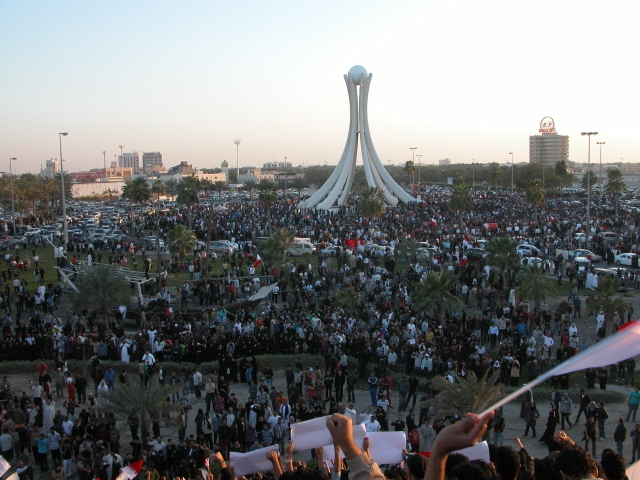
Protesters occupying Pearl Roundabout following the funeral procession for Ali Mushaima.

The following day another man, Fadhel Al-Matrook, was killed by police during the funeral of Mushaima. Protesters then marched and occupied the Pearl Roundabout without police interference. Thousands continued camping at the site for another day. On 17 February, in what became known as Bloody Thursday, authorities launched a pre-dawn raid and cleared the site, killing four protesters and injuring hundreds. Protesters took refuge in Salmaniya Medical Complex where many demanded the fall of the regime. Defying the ban on gatherings, on the evening of 18 February, hundreds of protesters marched toward the Pearl Roundabout, now under the control of the army. When protesters neared the site, the army opened fire, killing Abdulredha Buhmaid and injuring dozens of others.

Troops withdrew from the Pearl Roundabout on 19 February, and protesters reestablished their camps there. The crown prince assured protesters that they would be allowed to camp at the roundabout and that he would lead a national dialogue. Protests involving up to one-fifth of the population continued over the next month until the government called in Gulf Cooperation Council troops and police and declared a three-month state of emergency. Despite the police crackdown that followed, smaller-scale protests and clashes continued, mostly outside Manama's business districts. By April 2012, more than 80 people had died during the uprising.

=== Death of Fadhel Al-Matrook ===
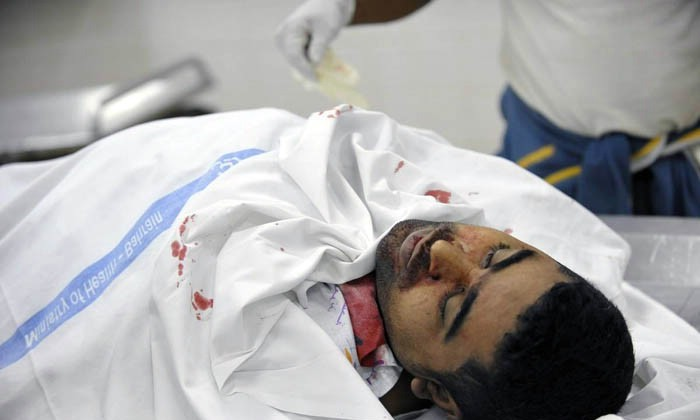
Fadhel Al-Matrook's body at Salmaniya morgue

Fadhel Salman Ali Salman Al-Matrook (Arabic: فاضل سلمان علي سلمان المتروك) (8 November 1979 – 15 February 2011) was a 31-year-old Bahraini who died in hospital on 15 February 2011 after being hit in the back and chest with birdshot fired from close range by Bahraini security forces during the 2011 Bahraini uprising. King Hamad bin Isa Al Khalifa announced in a rare televised speech that the deaths of Ali Abdulhadi Mushaima and Fadhel Al-Matrook would be investigated. However, results of the investigation have not been revealed as of November 2011.

As part of a string of protests that occurred across the Arab World following the self-immolation and eventual death of Mohammed Bouazizi in the Tunisian revolution, the mostly Shia population of Bahrain took to the streets demanding greater freedoms. Al Jazeera reported that a protest was planned for 14 February, just a few months after the controversial 2010 election.

On 14 February (referred to by protesters as the 'Day of Rage'), clashes were reported from parts of Bahrain. Helicopters circled over Manama, where protesters were expected to gather in the afternoon; there was also a greater police presence in Shia villages. At least fourteen people were injured in clashes overnight and with police having fired rubber bullets and tear gas at protesters in the village of Nuwaidrat, south west of Bahrain. The marchers were calling for the release detainees who were arrested during earlier protests.

Al-Matrook was married with two children, a 5-year-old son and a 2-year-old daughter. His father died when he was 8. Al-Matrook was unemployed and had been arrested once before, his brother reported. Al-Matrook lived in his father's house; his housing request went back seven years before his death.

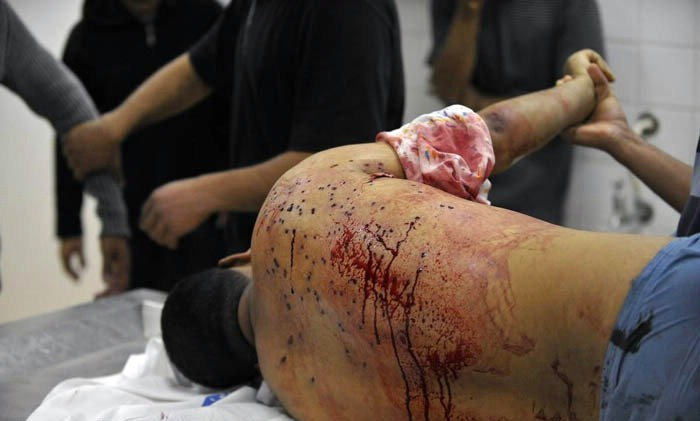
Police fired birdshot from close range at Al-Matrook's back.

On 15 February, the funeral procession of Ali Abdulhadi Mushaima, killed the previous day, took place. The march was authorized. It was organized that the body be taken from the Salmaniya medical complex and then carried to the cemetery in Al Daih for burial. According to eyewitnesses, more than 2,000 were starting to gather by the hospital gates in order to take part in the procession, when riot police used tear gas and shotguns to disperse the crowd. One man, Fadhel Al-Matrook, died in hospital after getting shot by birdshot pellets. Al-Matrook's brother, who was near him, told the local newspaper Al Wasat that his brother was shot from a very short distance, 2 to 5 meters away, which caused internal bleeding and punctured his lungs. According to witnesses, at least 25 were injured as a result of police rubber bullets, tear gas and shotgun.

An eyewitness, Shaker Mohammed Abdulhussain, who was also injured, told Al Wasat that police cars were parked near the Salmaniya Medical Complex gates where the funeral was supposed to move out from. To prevent clashes between mourners and riot police, mourners formed a human chain in which Shaker was standing next to Al-Matrook. There were two people speaking to riot police telling them that the youth will ensure that nothing would go wrong. Then a man wearing full black came from outside the funeral and threw a stone at riot police, who then started firing rubber bullets and bird pellets indiscriminately. While Shaker and Al-Matrook were trying to help a man who was injured by rubber bullets to his leg, they were shot with bird pellets. Shaker was injured in his chest and other places, while Al-Matrook was shot in his back and died in the hospital.

The Ministry of the Interior said in a statement that during the funeral of Ali Mushaima some mourners clashed with four police patrols which were parked in the funeral's course. They explained that clashes were because one patrol was not working and three patrols went to evacuate it. During the clash one man named Fadhel Al-Martook was injured and died later in a hospital.

On 16 February, thousands of Bahrainis took part in the funeral procession of Al-Matrook while others were camping in Pearl Roundabout for the second day in a row. The funeral began in Salmaniya medical complex and ended in Mahooz graveyard. Al-Matrook's coffin was covered with Bahrain's flag. The funeral began at 8:30 am, and mourners that took part carried pictures of Al-Matrook, Bahrain flags, and black flags which represent grief. They chanted "No god but Allah, the martyr is loved by Allah" and "No Sunni, No Shia, all of us are one united Bahrain".

The final funeral procession for Al-Matrook was on 18 February, which took part in Mahooz and ended in Mahooz graveyard. Mourners carried Bahrain flags as well as black flags. They chanted "we scarify our blood and soul for you martyr" and "we scarify our blood and soul for you Bahrain". One of the mourners carried flowers. Sheikh Mohammed Al-Mansi gave a speech at the end of the funeral procession.

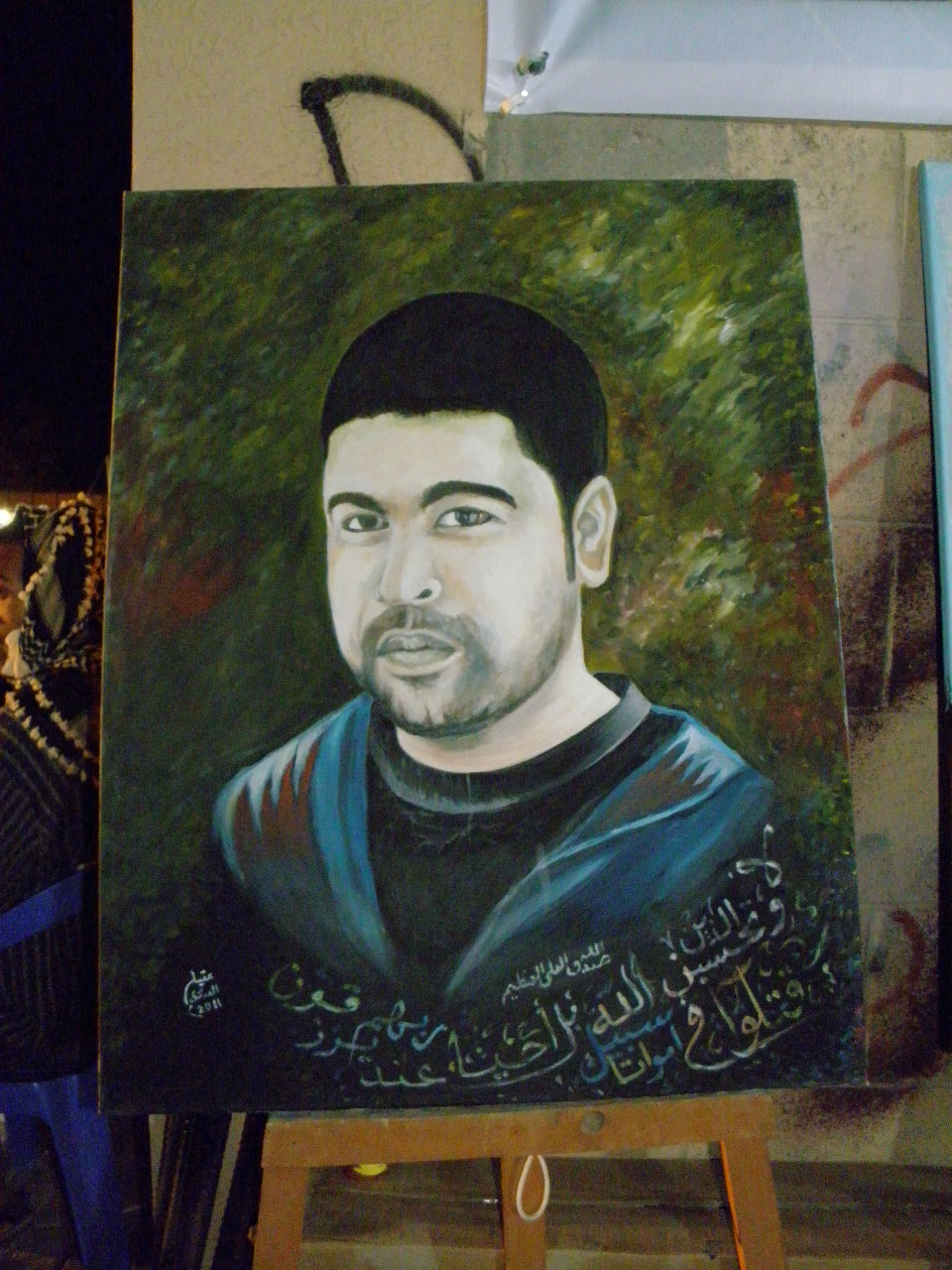
Portrait in memorial of Fadhel al-Matrook

- In a rare national TV address on Tuesday, 15 February, King Hamad expressed his regret about the victims of recent events and announced an investigation. He expressed regret about the deaths of Ali Mushaima and Fadhel Al-Matrook "There have sadly been two deaths. I express my deep condolences to their families," he said. "Everyone should know that I have assigned Deputy Prime Minister Jawad al-Urayyid to form a special committee to find out the reasons that led to such regrettable events," he added.
- Prime minister, Khalifa ibn Salman Al Khalifa praised the king's speech. "We regret the events which led to the death of two of my sons and express condolences to their families".
- Minister of Interior, Rashed bin Abdulla Al Khalifa said in a televised speech on 15 February, that they are reserving on those responsible for the death of Ali Abdulhadi Mushaima and Fadhel Al-Matrook and that initial investigations began. As well as full cooperation with the committee formed by Bahrain's king.
- Al Wefaq, the country's biggest opposition party suspended their participation in the Council of Representatives and threatened to resign, in protest at the brutal practices of the security forces, according to Matar Matar, Al Wefaq's MP (now former MP).
- The Independent block, the second largest in the parliament praised the king's speech and supported his decision to form an investigation committee. They also expressed condolences to families of victims.
- Nationalist Democratic Rally Society called for an open dialogue between the regime and civil society foundations. They emphasized their refusal and condemnation to the "brutal and repressive" methods that protests are dealt with by riot police which led to the death of 2 martyrs. They also expressed condolences to the families of the martyrs and victims.
- Progressive Democratic Tribune denounced the use of excessive force by security forces and called to respect the rights of people to protest. They expressed condolences to families of martyrs Ali Mushaima and Fadhel Al-Matrook who joined the martyrs convoy of our people in their journey to democracy. They Called for the formation of a national body which unites Shia and Sunna like the National Union Committee in the 1950s.
- Islamic Association party, a relatively small Shia society expressed condolences to citizens of Bahrain and the families of the victims. They said "At the same time that we emphasize our refusal to the excessive use of force against protesters, we stress the importance of keeping the peacefulness of the protests". and "we appeal to the committee formed by Bahrain's king to make a neutral and honest investigation and to accelerate publishing the results as well as punishing those responsible".
- P.J. Crowley, the United States State Department spokesman said: "The United States is very concerned by recent violence surrounding protests in Bahrain,". He added that US welcomed the investigation into the killings and urged the government of Bahrain to "quickly follow up on its pledge."
- Amnesty International called for the authorities to "immediately stop using excessive force against the protesters", "set up an immediate, thorough and independent investigation into the deaths of ‘Ali ‘Abdulhadi Mushaima’ and Fadhel ‘Ali Matrook, and ensure that any police found to have used excessive force are brought to justice." and to "respect and protect the right of freedom expression, movement and assembly in Bahrain".

== Local and international reactions ==
In a rare national TV address on Tuesday, 15 February, King Hamad expressed regret, offered his "deep condolences" to the families of those killed and announced a ministerial probe into the events. He also promised reforms including a reduction in government restrictions of the Internet and other media. In reference to the Egyptian Revolution of 2011, Hussain al-Rumeihy, a member of Parliament, said on 15 February it was wrong for protesters to copy the events of other Arab countries, because the situation in Bahrain is different. The following day, Prime minister Khalifa ibn Salman Al Khalifa praised the king's speech and shared his regret and condolences.

On the other hand, Al Wefaq, the country's largest opposition party suspended their participation in the Parliament on 15 February and threatened to resign, in protest of what it called "the brutal practices of security forces". The same day, other opposition parties protested what they called the government's "excessive" reaction to protests, and the Progressive Democratic Tribune called for formation of a national body to unite Shia and Sunna like the National Union Committee had done in the 1950s. The Bahrain Human Rights Society criticized the government response to protests of 14th and 15th, accusing it of censorship and non-compliance with international covenants that it had signed.

Internationally, Navi Pillay, the United Nations High Commissioner for Human Rights on 15 February, called the government of Bahrain to stop what she called "the excessive use of force" against protesters and to release protest-related prisoners. United States State Department spokesman P.J. Crowley said that the US was "very concerned by recent violence surrounding protests" of the 14th and 15th. In a 15 February appeal, Amnesty International called the Bahraini authorities to stop using what it called "excessive force" against protesters, to put all security forces' members who had used excessive force on trial and "to respect and protect the right of freedom expression, movement and assembly in Bahrain".
