= Death of Ali Abdulhadi Mushaima =

Ali Abdulhadi Mushaima
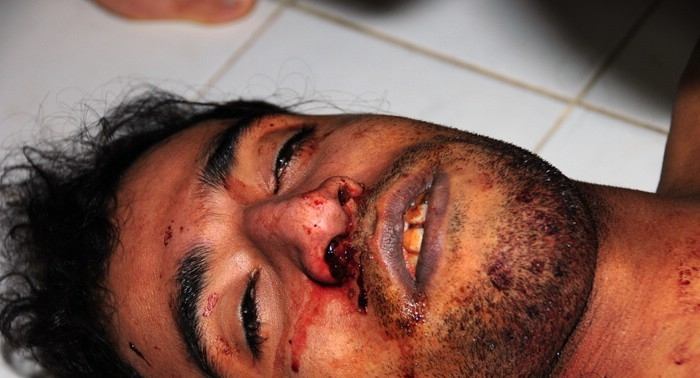
- Mushaima's body at the morgue
- Born: علي عبدالهادي مشيمع; 26 August 1989; Al Daih, Bahrain
- Died: 14 February 2011 (aged 21); Al Daih, Bahrain
- Cause of death: Gunshot wounds caused by birdshot
- Resting place: Jidhafs
- Known for: being the first fatality of the Bahraini uprising (2011–present)
- Parent(s): Abdulhadi (Father); Mohammed Mushaima (Uncle)
- Death of Ali Mushaima
- Date: 14 February 2011; 15 years ago
- Location: Al Daih, Bahrain
- Deaths: Ali Mushaima

Ali Abdulhadi Saleh Jafar Mushaima (Arabic: علي عبدالهادي صالح جعفر مشيمع) (26 August 1989 – 14 February 2011) was a 21-year-old Bahraini who on Monday 14 February 2011, the "Bahraini Day of Rage", became the first fatality of the Bahraini Uprising. He died on his way to hospital from injuries he received when he was hit in the back by birdshot pellets fired from close range (two to five meters) by security forces (riot police) during the Bahraini uprising (2011–present). According to Nabeel Rajab, head of Bahrain Centre for Human Rights, Mushaima was participating in a protest in Al Daih, on Manama's outskirts, when he was shot.

In a rare televised speech the King of Bahrain, Hamad bin Isa Al Khalifa, announced that the deaths of Ali Abdulhadi Mushaima and Fadhel Al-Matrook would be investigated. Bahrain's Interior Minister said that legal steps would be taken if the use of the weapon had been unwarranted.

Details of the investigation were disclosed in the report of the Bahrain Independent Commission of Inquiry, established by King Hamad to look into events in the Bahraini uprising. The investigation failed to identify any culprits in the killing of Mushaima. The Commission concluded that Mushaima's death was the result of excessive and unjustified force from the police.

== Background ==
As part of a string of protests that occurred across the Arab World following the self-immolation and eventual death of Mohammed Bouazizi in Tunisia, the mostly Shia population of Bahrain took to the streets demanding greater freedoms. Al Jazeera reported that a protest was planned for 14 February, just a few months after the controversial 2010 election.

On 14 February (referred to by protesters as Day of Rage), clashes were reported from parts of Bahrain. Helicopters circled over Manama, where protesters were expected to gather in the afternoon; there was also a greater police presence in Shia villages. At least fourteen people were injured in clashes overnight and with police having fired rubber bullets and tear gas at protesters in the village of Nuwaidrat, south west of Bahrain. The marchers were calling for the release of detainees who were arrested during earlier protests.

== Short biography ==
Mushaima was the eldest son, he had one brother and one sister. His uncle Mohammed explained that Mushaima's family were extremely poor and had been living in his grandfather's house since it was built in the 1980s. They were still waiting to be rehoused, having first applied in 1988. Mushaima worked as a welder and supported the family financially.

=== Previous detention ===
Ali Abdulhadi Mushaima was detained for 20 days when he was aged 16. In 2009 he was detained again for 4 months in connection with what is known in Bahrain as the "Hujaira case". Mushaima's mother stated that he had been subjected to physical and mental torture. She said that although he was not involved in any political activities, Mushaima was closely monitored by the authorities.

== Death ==
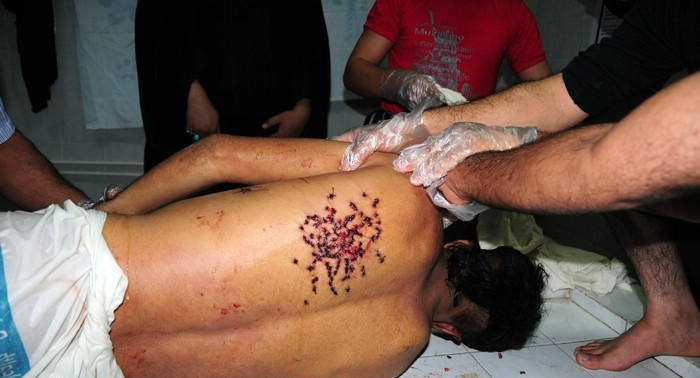
Police fired birdshot at Ali Mushaima's back from close range

During the so-called "Day of Rage" on 14 February, Mushaima participated in a protest in Al Daih, west of the capital Manama. After security forces used tear gas to disperse protesters, Mushaima returned to his home in Al Daih where he had his last dinner with his family.

The Al Wasat, a local independent newspaper, interviewed members of Mushaima's family, the main witnesses to his death. Mushaima's aunt, who lived in the same house, reported that Mushaima left home at 7:30 pm after having dinner. She went out after him and saw him walking back. He fell to the ground but got up again and she helped him get back home. He fell when he entered the house; she said that his body was "full of blood" and he vomited some blood. Mushaima's mother reported that policemen had fired birdshot at her son a few seconds after he went out. Mushaima's father heard a gunshot and was going to investigate when Mushaima entered the house and started vomiting blood. Mushaima was taken by car to hospital with his father, aunt, and two of his cousins. Mushaima's aunt said that a few minutes before they reached the hospital she felt his pulse but it had stopped.

Mushaima's uncle Mohammed, said that Mushaima went out after hearing a strange sound. The house is located in a very narrow alley; after Mushaima reached the end of the alley he was hit by birdshot fired from close range.

Mushaima's death was announced one hour after arriving at the Salmaniya medical complex. Birdshot pellets had entered Mushaima's body and penetrated his heart and lung causing severe bleeding that led to his death.

== Aftermath ==
Interior Minister, Shaikh Rashid bin Abdullah Al Khalifa, offered his condolences and deep sympathy to the family and promised an investigation into the use of a weapon. According to the Ministry statement, if the investigation found no legal justification for the use of the weapon, legal steps would be taken to have the person responsible referred to the criminal court.

In a televised speech on 15 February, Interior Ministry spokesman Tariq Al-Hassan said that Mushaima had died in a separate incident, not while participating in a protest.

According to Mushaima's mother, a few days after his death a government official visited Mushaima's family and offered them a cheque. The family refused, and instead asked that Mushaima's killer(s) be punished.

=== Investigation ===
The Interior Ministry conducted an investigation into Mushaima's death, as the Bahrain Independent Commission of Inquiry report revealed. The investigation concluded that around 500 protesters had surrounded six police officers and attacked them with rocks. The policemen tried unsuccessfully to disperse the crowd using rubber bullets and tear gas. After their supply of rubber bullets and gas was exhausted the police then used shotguns and managed to disperse the crowd between 18:00 and 18:30, at which point the officers set out on foot patrol. Although Ali allegedly died at 19:00, no police officer reported clashes at that time, seeing an injured protester or hearing any shots fired while on foot patrol.

Although the Bahrain Independent Commission of Inquiry was unable to determine the effectiveness of individual investigations conducted by the Interior Ministry, the Commission described the Ministry's findings generally as "in many cases, flawed and biased in its favour."

=== Funeral and protests ===
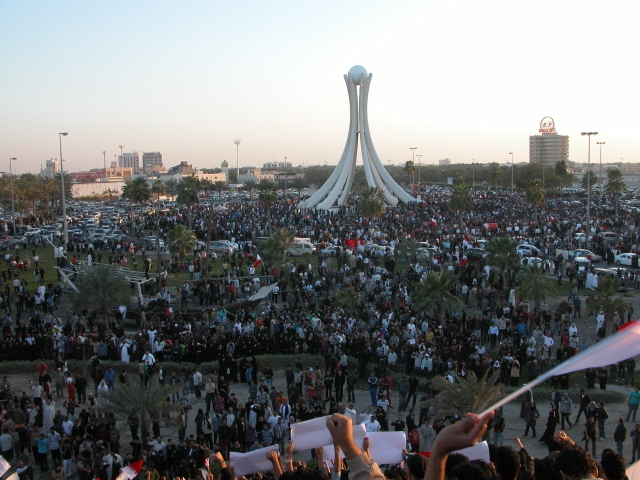
Protesters occupying Pearl Roundabout following the funeral procession.

On 14 February, after Mushaima's death was announced, a large crowd gathered at the Salmaniya medical complex. Late into the night they set off in a protest march towards Pearl Roundabout in Manama. Clashes with security forces resulted in some of the protesters being injured.

Because of delays waiting for the coroner and the public prosecutor's report, Mushaima's body was not released to the family until late after midnight.

On 15 February, funeral procession of Mushaima took place. It was organized that the body be taken from the Salmaniya medical complex and then carried to the cemetery in Al Daih for burial. According to eyewitnesses, more than 2,000 people were starting to gather by hospital gates in order to take part in the procession, when riot police began firing tear gas and shotguns at them. One man, Fadhel Al-Matrook, died in hospital after getting shot by shotgun pellets. According to witnesses, at least 25 people were injured as a result of police rubber bullets, tear gas and shotgun.

An estimated 10,000 people participated in the funeral march for Mushaima through the streets of Jidhafs and Al Daih, west of Manama. Mourners carried Bahrain flags as well as black flags.

After the funeral, protesters marched to the Pearl Roundabout, where security forces were already stationed. The protesters were initially allowed to occupy the traffic junction and the security forces withdrew without any violent clashes. Two days later, however, on Bloody Thursday (2011), security forces attacked the crowd and killed four more protesters.

The next day, Mushaima's final mourning rituals were held in Al Daih. Thousands of mourners carrying Bahrain and black flags participated in the ritual mourning procession from Al Daih Ma'tam to Jidhafs graveyard. Mourners chanted "With our blood and soul we sacrifice ourselves for Martyr" and "With our blood and soul we sacrifice ourselves for Bahrain".

At the close of the mourning ceremony, many mourners carrying Bahrain flags gathered for a protest march to the Pearl Roundabout. As they reached the fire station in Manama, with army forces stationed 100 meters away from them, they were chanting "peaceful, peaceful". Witnesses said that soldiers opened fire on the protesters using live ammunition, wounding at least 40 including Abdul Redha Buhmaid, who was shot in the head and died a few days later.

== Local and international reactions ==
- In a rare national TV address on Tuesday, February 15, King Hamad expressed his regret about the victims of recent events and announced an investigation. He expressed regret about the deaths of Ali Mushaima and Fadhel Al-Matrook "There have sadly been two deaths. I express my deep condolences to their families," he said. "Everyone should know that I have assigned Deputy Prime Minister Jawad al-Urayyid to form a special committee to find out the reasons that led to such regrettable events," he added.
- Prime minister, Khalifa ibn Salman Al Khalifa praised the king's speech. "We regret the events which led to the death of two of my sons and express condolences to their families".
- Minister of Interior, Rashed bin Abdulla Al Khalifa said in a televised speech on February 15, that they are reserving on those responsible for the death of Ali Abdulhadi Mushaima and Fadhel Al-Matrook and that initial investigations began. As well as full cooperation with the committee formed by Bahrain's king.
- Al Wefaq, the country's biggest opposition party suspended their participation in the Parliament and threatened to resign, in protest at the brutal practices of the security forces, according to Matar Matar, Al Wefaq's MP (now former MP).
- The Independent block, the second largest in the parliament praised the king's speech and supported his decision to form an investigation committee. They also expressed condolences to families of victims.
- Nationalist Democratic Rally Society called for an open dialogue between the regime and civil society foundations. They emphasized their refusal and condemnation to the "brutal and repressive" methods that protests are dealt with by riot police which led to the death of 2 martyrs. They also expressed condolences to the families of the martyrs and victims.
- Progressive Democratic Tribune denounced the use of excessive force by security forces and called to respect the rights of people to protest. They expressed condolences to families of martyrs Ali Mushaima and Fadhel Al-Matrook who joined the martyrs convoy of our people in their journey to democracy. They Called for the formation of a national body which unites Shia and Sunna like the National Union Committee in the 1950s.
- Islamic Association party, a relatively small Shia society expressed condolences to citizens of Bahrain and the families of the victims. They said "At the same time that we emphasize our refusal to the excessive use of force against protesters, we stress the importance of keeping the peacefulness of the protests". and "we appeal to the committee formed by Bahrain's king to make a neutral and honest investigation and to accelerate publishing the results as well as punishing those responsible".
- P.J. Crowley, the United States State Department spokesman said: "The United States is very concerned by recent violence surrounding protests in Bahrain,". He added that US welcomed the investigation into the killings and urged the government of Bahrain to "quickly follow up on its pledge."
- Amnesty International called for the authorities "to immediately stop using excessive force against the protesters", "to set up an immediate, thorough and independent investigation into the deaths of ‘Ali ‘Abdulhadi Mushaima’ and Fadhel ‘Ali Matrook, and ensure that any police found to have used excessive force are brought to justice." and "to respect and protect the right of freedom expression, movement and assembly in Bahrain".
- In May 2011, Council of Representatives of Bahrain dismissed one of its employees due to taking part in the funeral procession of Ali Abdulhadi Mushaima.

== See also ==
- Death of Fadhel Al-Matrook
- Bloody Thursday
- Death of Ahmed Jaber al-Qattan
