= Fadhila Mubarak =

- Occupation: Democracy activist
- Known for: Arrest during 2011 Bahraini uprising

Fadhila Mubarak (Arabic: فضيلة مبارك) is a Bahraini democracy activist. On 18 May 2011, she became the first female activist to be convicted of a role in the Bahraini uprising, and was named a prisoner of conscience by Amnesty International.

On 27 March 2011, Mubarak was driving with her 8-year-old son and her 14- and 15-year-old nieces in the car when she was stopped near Riffa (southwest of Manama) by a police checkpoint. A police officer told her that she was "playing music calling for the overthrow of the regime", and asked her to turn down the volume. Mubarak refused, instead asking the officer for his identification. According to the police officers at the scene, Mubarak then stepped from her vehicle, grabbed the shirt of an officer, and shoved him. Mubarak, in contrast, alleges that after being insulted and cursed by security officers, a man in civilian clothing tried to force her into a car; not knowing that he was a security officer, she resisted and was struck in the head by the officer.

Mubarak was then taken to a police station in Riffa. She later stated that she was beaten by policewomen while in custody there, before being transferred to a police station in Isa Town, where she was beaten again. After authorities discovered that she had participated in the March protests at Pearl Roundabout, as well as a poem she had written about revolution and freedom for her son, she was charged with "assault on a public officer", "incitement for hatred of the regime", "participation in a rally with the intent to commit crimes", and "undermining public order" by Bahrain's National Safety Court of First Instance, a military court. On 18 May 2011, she was sentenced to four years' imprisonment. Amnesty International reported that she was denied a lawyer both before and during her trial, meeting her lawyer for the first time one week after receiving her sentence. On 8 June 2011, her sentence was reduced by an appeals court to eighteen months' imprisonment. This sentence was upheld by a court of cassation on 30 January 2012. Mubarak's family expressed concern for her health, as she was receiving treatment for ovarian cysts shortly before her imprisonment.

The Bahrain Centre for Human Rights described Mubarak's imprisonment as "illegal detention for merely exercising [her] rights to freedom of expression in accordance to the Universal Declaration of Human Rights, Article 19", and called for her immediate release. On 30 January 2012, Amnesty International named her a prisoner of conscience, "sentenced in an unfair trial before a military court on spurious charges for standing up for her rights"; the organization also called for her release.

Although her sentence was upheld by a Bahraini court in late January 2012, Mubarak was released on 6 February 2012. At a rally in al-Muqsha organized by the Bahraini opposition, she was welcomed by thousands of supporters waving national flags while revolutionary music played in the background. Mubarak reported difficulties following her release, including 800 dinars in unpaid car loans and a lawsuit from her employer for "unauthorized absence". Unable to find work, she lives partly on donations from sympathizers.
