= International rankings of Bahrain =

These are the international rankings of Bahrain.

== International rankings ==
Survey	Organisation	Year	Score	Global ranking
Freedom in the World	Freedom House	2017	6.5 out of 7 (not free)	N/A
Global Enabling Trade Report	World Economic Forum	2016	4.8 out of 7	42
Global Gender Gap Report	World Economic Forum	2016	0.615	131
Global Competitiveness Index	World Economic Forum	2017	4.54 out of 6	44
Freedom of the Press	Freedom House	2017	78 out of 100 (not free)	N/A
Press Freedom Index	Reporters Without Borders	2017	50.84 out of 150	164 out of 178
Economic Freedom of the World	Fraser Institute	2017	8 out of 10	7
Index of Economic Freedom	The Heritage Foundation and The Wall Street Journal	2017	68.5 out of 100	44
Corruption Perceptions Index	Transparency International	2016	4.3 out of 10	70
Democracy Index	Economist Intelligence Unit	2011	2.92 out of 10 (Authoritarian regime & Absolute monarchy)	144 out of 167
International Property Rights Index	Americans for Tax Reform's Property Rights Alliance	2008	5.0 out of 10	62
Global Peace Index	Institute for Economics and Peace	2011	2.398	123
Human Development Index	United Nations Development Programme	2011	0.806	42
Freedom on the Net	Freedom House	2017	71 out of 100 (not free)	28 out of 37
World Intellectual Property Organization	Global Innovation Index	2026		64 out of 139

== Freedom ==
=== Political Freedom ===
Years	2010	2011	2012
Status	Not Free	Not Free	Not Free
Freedom Rating	5.5	5.5	6
Civil Liberties	5	5	6
Political Rights	6	6	6

Scores are on a 1 to 7 scale, 1 being best.

Freedom in the World is a yearly survey and report by U.S.-based Freedom House that attempts to measure the degree of democracy and political freedom in every nation and significant disputed territories around the world.

Bahrain net change in aggregate score declined by more than 4 points. From 2008 to 2012 Bahrain net change in aggregate score declined by 17 points, making it the fourth country declining globally in that period.

=== Trade Freedom ===
Years	2006	2007	2008	2009	2010	2011
Global Enabling Trade Report	-	-	-	-	4.95	-
Global Rank	-	-	-	24	22	-
Global Gender Gap Report	0.5894	0.5931	0.5927	0.6136	0.6217	0.6232
Global Rank	102	115	121	116	110	110
Global Competitiveness Index	-	-	4.57	4.54	4.54	4.54
Global Rank	-	43	37	38	37	37

=== Press Freedom ===
==== Freedom House ====
Years	2011
Press Status	Not Free
Press Freedom Score	72
Regional Rank	12
Legal Environment	25
Political Environment	27
Economical Environment	20

Scores are on a 0 to 100 scale, 0 being best.

Freedom of the Press is a yearly report by US-based non-governmental organization Freedom House, measuring the level of freedom and editorial independence enjoyed by the press in every nation and significant disputed territories around the world. Levels of freedom are scored on a scale from 1 (most free) to 100 (least free). Depending on the ratings, the nations are then classified as "Free", "Partly Free", or "Not Free".

==== Reporters Without Borders ====
Years	2002	2003	2004	2005	2006	2007	2008	2009	2010	2011-2012
Press Freedom Index	23	35.17	52.5	38.75	28	38	21.17	36.50	51.35	125
Global Rank	67	117	143	123	111	118	96	119	144	173

Scores are on a -10 to 142 scale, -10 being best (most free press).

The Press Freedom Index is an annual ranking of countries compiled and published by Reporters Without Borders based upon the organization's assessment of their press freedom records.

=== Economic Freedom ===
==== Fraser Institute ====
Years	1980	1985	1990	1995	2000	2001	2002	2003	2004	2005	2006	2007	2008	2009	2010	2011
Economic Freedom	7.5	6.9	6.9	6.9	7.3	7.2	7.1	7.3	7.1	7.0	7.6	7.7	7.6	7.6	-	7.59
Global Rank	4	14	18	35	28	27	29	30	38	54	22	14	14	11	-	11

==== The Heritage Foundation/The Wall Street Journal ====
Years	1995	1996	1997	1998	1999	2000	2001	2002	2003	2004	2005	2006	2007	2008	2009	2010	2011	2012
Index of Economic Freedom	-	-	-	-	-	-	-	-	-	-	-	-	-	-	-	-	7.59	75.2
Global Rank	5	6	6	6	8	11	11	12	11	13	22	23	24	19	-	-	11	12

== Corruption ==
Years	2003	2004	2005	2006	2007	2008	2009	2010	2011
Corruption Perceptions Index	6.1	5.8	5.8	5.7	5.0	5.4	5.1	4.9	5.1
Global Rank	27	34	36	36	46	43	46	48	46

Scores are on a 0-10 scale, 10 being best (least corrupt / bribery least necessary).

== Rights ==
=== Democracy Index ===
Years	2006	2007	2008	2010	2011
Global rank	93	123	130	122	144
Democracy Index	5.42	3.53	3.38	3.49	2.92
Category	Hybrid regime	Authoritarian regime	Authoritarian regime	Authoritarian regime	Authoritarian regime
Nominal type of government	-	-	Constitutional monarchy	Absolute monarchy	Absolute monarchy

The Democracy Index is an index compiled by the Economist Intelligence Unit that measures the state of democracy in 167 countries, of which 166 are sovereign states and 165 are UN member states. The Economist Intelligence Unit's Democracy Index is based on 60 indicators grouped in five different categories: electoral process and pluralism, civil liberties, functioning of government, political participation and political culture. The Index was first produced in 2006, with updates produced in 2008, 2010 and 2011.

=== Property rights ===
Years	2008
Property Rights Index	5.0
Global rank	62

== Other ==
=== Global Peace Index ===
Years	2007	2008	2009	2010	2011
Global Peace Index	1.995	2.025	1.881	1.956	2.398
Global rank	62	74	69	70	123

=== Human Development Index ===
Years	2008	2010	2011
Human Development Index	.902	0.801	0.806
Global rank	32	39	42

=== Freedom on the Net ===
Years	2011
Freedom on the Net status	Not Free
Obstacles to Access	11
Limits on Content	22
Violations of User Rights	29
Total	62

Scores are on a 0 to 100 scale, 0 being best.

Freedom on the Net is a yearly survey and report by U.S.-based Freedom House.
