= Pearl Roundabout =

Circular traffic intersection in Manama, Bahrain; destroyed during the 2011 uprising

Coordinates: 26°13′49″N 50°33′41″E

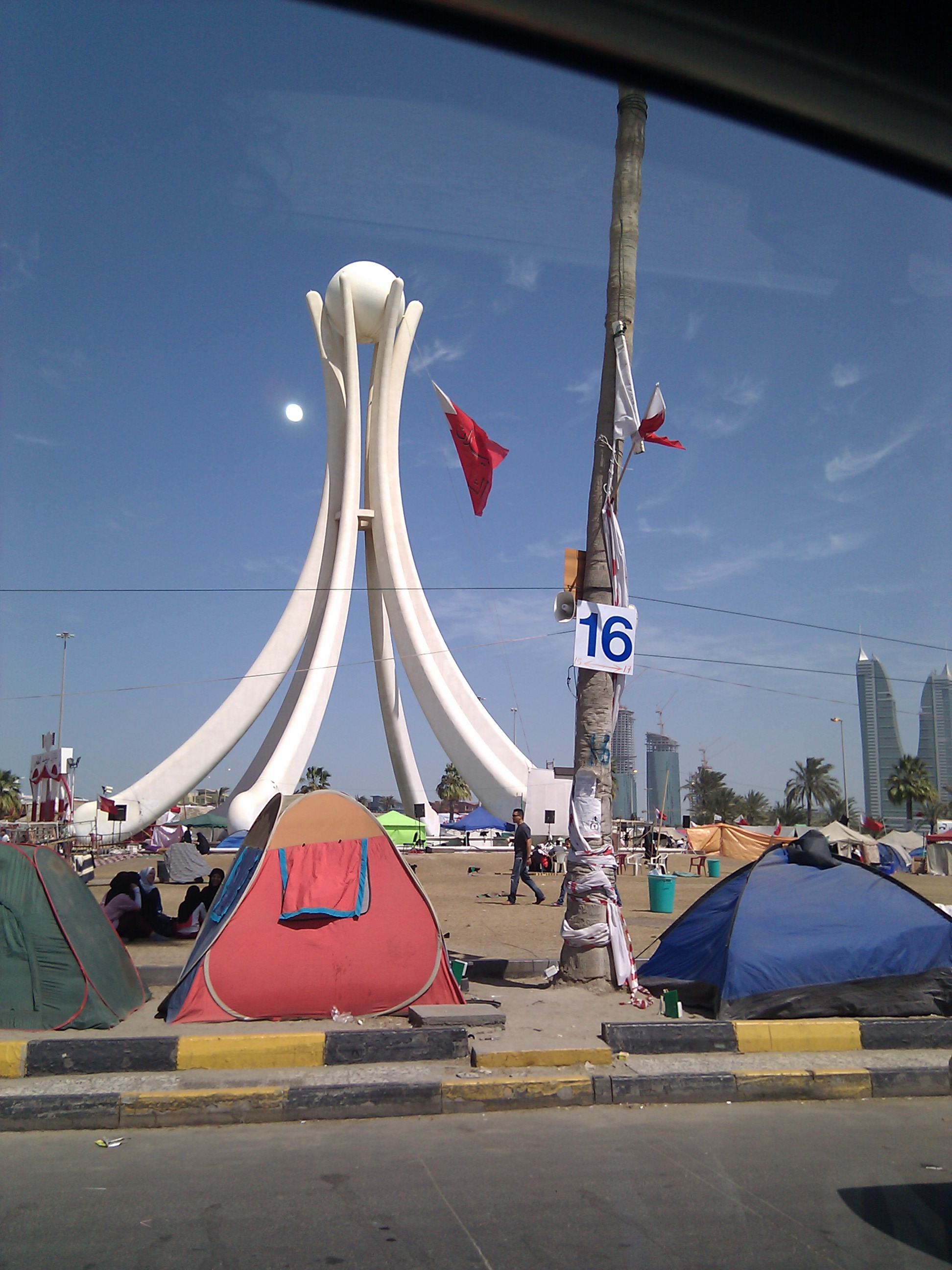
Protesters camped out in front of the Pearl Roundabout days before it was torn down

The Gulf Cooperation Council or GCC Roundabout, known as Pearl Roundabout or Lulu Roundabout (Arabic: دوار اللؤلؤ(ة), romanized: Dawwār al-luʾluʾ(ah), lit. 'Roundabout of the pearl(s)'), was a roundabout located near the financial district of Manama, Bahrain. The roundabout was named after the pearl monument that previously stood at the site and was destroyed on 18 March 2011 by government forces as part of a crackdown on protesters during the Bahraini uprising of 2011. The roundabout itself was replaced on its site by the Al Farooq Junction in 2017 in a traffic reconfiguration.

== History ==
The roundabout was located in the heart of the capital Manama and was surrounded by the Bahrain Central Market, Marina, Pearl and City Center Roundabout as well the Abraj Al Lulu (Pearl Towers) apartment complex, which is named after the Pearl Monument. Also near the site of the destroyed roundabout are some of the city's major landmarks, including the Bahrain World Trade Center and the Bahrain Financial Harbour.

The roundabout served originally as a major traffic intersection for routes into the capital city, although it is now bypassed by a flyover and junction complex built as part of Bahrain's 2030 modernization plan.

The Pearl Monument previously stood in the center of the circle, having been erected in 1982 on the occasion of the third summit of the Gulf Cooperation Council, which was hosted by Bahrain for the first time in Manama on 9–11 November of that year.

=== Symbols and representation ===
The Pearl Monument consisted of six dhow "sails" projecting up to the sky, which came together to hold a pearl at the top. The six sails designated the Gulf Cooperation Council's six member nations, while the pearl symbolized their united heritage and the country's famous history of pearl cultivation. At the base of the monument was a dodecagonal pool with fountain jets. The Pearl Monument was featured on the face of the Bahraini half-dinar coin, the highest value coin in Bahraini currency. The Central Bank of Bahrain reportedly asked banks to exchange their half-dinar coins for half-dinar banknotes after the Pearl Monument was destroyed. The coin is no longer minted or distributed by the Central Bank of Bahrain.

=== Demolition ===
On the morning of 18 March 2011, the government tore down the Pearl Monument, the rallying point for anti-government protests.

Barely thirty years later, on the morning of 18 March 2011, the government tore down the Pearl Monument, announcing on state broadcaster BTV that the monument had been "violated" and "desecrated" by the "vile" anti-government protests, and had to be "cleansed". In the government's haste, a migrant crane worker was crushed to death by a falling cement arch. As per the credited filmmaker of Al Jazeera undercover documentary Bahrain: Shouting in the Dark May Ying Welsh, the moment of demolition was censored on state television in order to hide the man's death.

== Bahraini uprising (2011–2014) ==
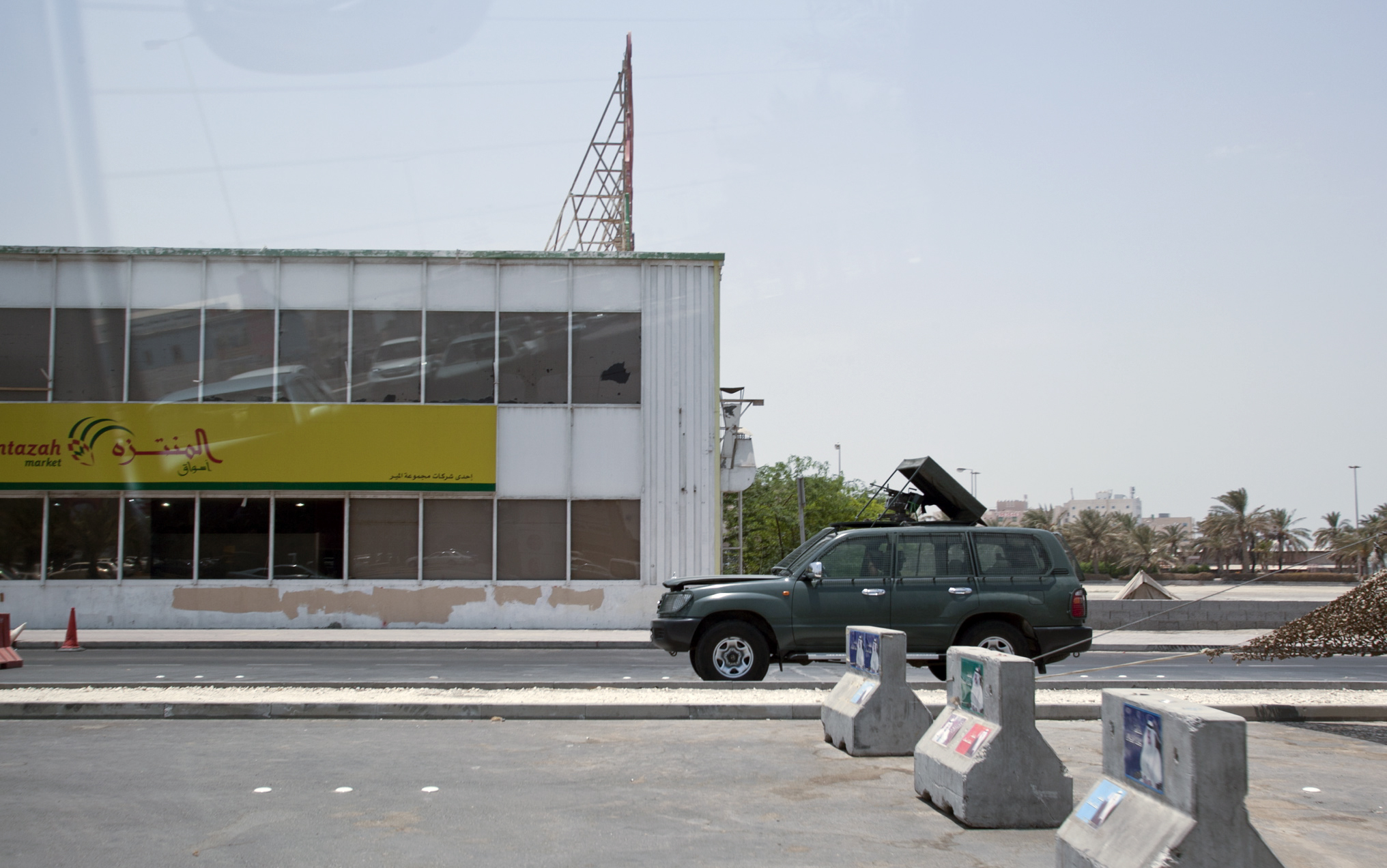
A July 2011 photo showing army checkpoints still surrounding the area where Pearl Roundabout was located

The Pearl Roundabout was the site of demonstrations during 2011, which began in February. It has been compared by the protesters to Cairo's Tahrir Square, the main site of demonstrations during the 2011 Egyptian revolution.

On 15 February 2011, after the funeral procession of Ali Mushaima, shot and killed by riot police during the Day of Rage, more people joined the demonstrators and moved towards the Pearl Roundabout, where they arrived at around 15:00. By 15:15, demonstrators began to set up tents there, and later in the day a projector screen was installed. There was also a tent erected by members of the Salmaniya Medical Complex (SMC) medical staff. Some demonstrators obstructed traffic in the roundabout overpass. By nightfall, the number of demonstrators had reached several thousand. The roundabout and its immediate vicinity were congested with protesters and private vehicles. Police in the area neither engaged the demonstrators nor did they attempt to disperse them. King Hamad had ordered that members of the procession be allowed to occupy the Pearl Roundabout to express their sadness.

On 17 February 2011, while demonstrators were spending the night at the Pearl Roundabout, police forces entered the location at 3:00 in an attempt to disperse the protesters. The crackdown led to many injuries as well as the death of at least four civilians (See Bloody Thursday).

Soon after the police crackdown on demonstrators, Bahraini police official Al-Hassan appeared on national television to explain the previous night's events. Al-Hassan argued that demonstrators were warned beforehand and that they refused to leave the area. He also added that demonstrators were actually in possession of weapons such as knives and pistols. The Bahrain Independent Commission of Inquiry, was established by King Hamad of Bahrain to prepare a report on the events on February and March saw no evidence to suggest that protesters at the roundabout were armed.

Soon after the police crackdown, Bahrain Defense Force tanks occupied Pearl Roundabout to stop demonstrators from occupying the area. Some demonstrators who stayed close to Salmaniya Hospital, where injured demonstrators were being assisted, tried to retake Pearl Roundabout and headed towards the area. Demonstrators were shot by forces camping at the roundabout.

Following these events, the Crown Prince of Bahrain, Salman Al Khalifa went on Bahrain state television and demanded calm of all parties. The following day, he ordered the military tanks to leave the Pearl Monument and protesters were allowed to occupy the area peacefully and were guaranteed by the Crown Prince that they would be able to demonstrate without any further attacks. On 16 March, however, the protesters' camp in the roundabout was evacuated, bulldozed, and set on fire by the Bahraini Defense Force, riot police, and Peninsula Shield Force, two days before the Pearl Monument was demolished. An expatriate crane operator was crushed to death during the demolition by a piece of the monument which fell onto his crane cabin.

== Al Farooq Junction ==
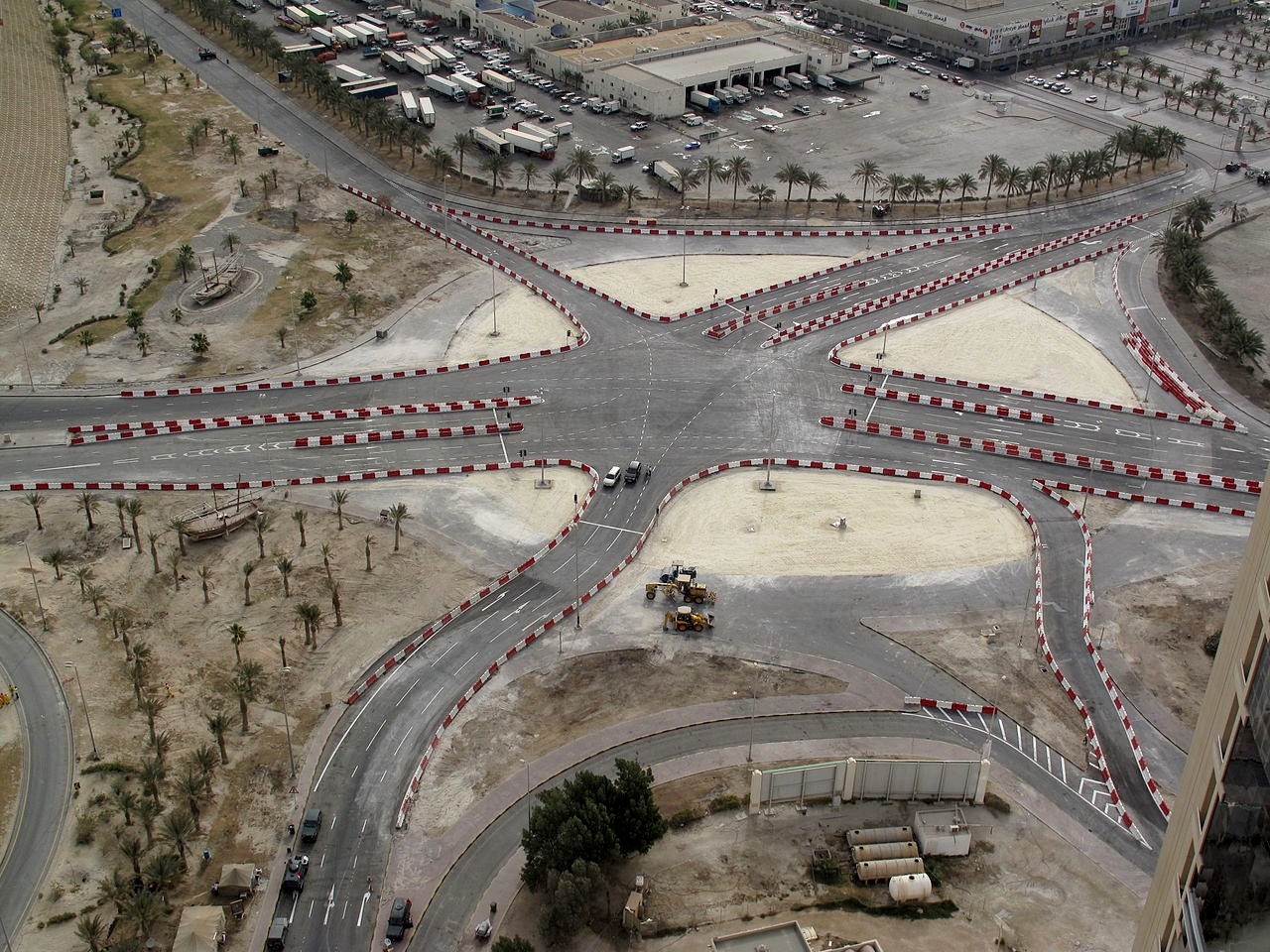
Al Farooq Junction under construction in late March 2011.

After demolishing the Pearl Monument, the government announced that the roundabout would be replaced with traffic lights, possibly to ease congestion in the financial district. The government changed the name of the site to Al Farooq Junction, a reference to Umar ibn al-Khattab, a historical figure revered by Sunni Muslims as the second Caliph, but hated by Shi'a, who believe him to be the killer of Muhammad's daughter and Ali's wife Fatima. The name of Al Farooq was given to the junction as well as the military operation by Khalifa Bin Ahmed Al Khalifa, the head of security forces and a member of the royal family.

On 25 February 2015, the public was restricted from accessing Al Farooq Junction. The area was sealed off by security forces since protesters were cleared from the Pearl Roundabout on 16 March 2011. On 14 June 2017, the junction was opened to the public.
