= Al Daih =

Village in Bahrain

Coordinates: 26°13′N 50°32′E

Al Daih (Arabic: الديه, Persian: دِه/ديه, romanized: deh) is a village on the north of Bahrain. It lies to the east of Budaiya, west of Al Manama.

== Etymology ==
Al-Daih, is derived from Persian: دِه/ديه, romanized: deh, meaning "small village".

It was formerly known as Al Bida, Abu Al Zila.

== Demographics ==
The vast majority of Al-Daih’s inhabitants are Baharna.

== History ==
In March of 2014 three police in the village of Daih were killed by a bomb. Saraya al-Ashtar claimed responsibility.

== See also ==
- List of cities in Bahrain
