= Nuwaidrat =

Village in Bahrain

Coordinates: 26°08′N 50°36′E

Nuwaidrat (Arabic: النويدرات) is a village located in Bahrain, close to Sitra; it was formerly part of the Sitra Municipality.

Location of Nuwaidrat

== History ==
=== 1990s uprising ===
During the 1990s Bahraini uprising, a policeman named Ibrahim al-Saeedi was killed in Eker after being surrounded by a trio of armed anti-government vandals and then killed by one of the three men, a Nuwaidrat resident named Isa Qambar. Qambar was executed on March 26, 1996. A memorial for Qambar was held in the village on March 26, 2008. Also present was Ali Salman, the leader of the then largest political party in Bahrain, Al Wefaq, which has since been dissolved.

=== 2011 protests ===
On February 14, 2011, police used tear gas against rioters in the village; they were participating in country-wide protests. The marchers were demanding the release of those detained during earlier protests.

On the evening of September 30 2015, security forces discovered a large bomb-making factory in Nuwaidrat and arrested a number of suspects allegedly linked to Iran's Revolutionary Guards. The next day, October 1, Bahrain recalled its ambassador to Iran and asked the Iranian acting charge d’affaires to leave the kingdom within 72 hours after declaring him persona non-grata. Bahrain's decision to recall its ambassador came "in light of continued Iranian meddling in the affairs of the kingdom of Bahrain ... in order to create sectarian strife and to impose hegemony and control.
