= Mohammed bin Khalifa bin Ahmed =

Bahraini politician (born 1975)

Mohammed bin Khalifa bin Ahmed Al Khalifa

Chairman of Bapco
- In office 2015–2019
- Monarch: Hamad bin Isa Al Khalifa
- Prime Minister: Khalifa bin Salman Al Khalifa, Salman, Crown Prince of Bahrain
- Preceded by: Adel Al Moayyed
- Succeeded by: Dawood Nassif

Minister of Oil and Gas
- Incumbent
- Assumed office June 5, 2016
- Monarch: Hamad bin Isa Al Khalifa
- Prime Minister: Khalifa bin Salman Al Khalifa, Salman, Crown Prince of Bahrain
- Preceded by: Abdulhussein bin Ali Mirza

Personal details
- Born: Mohammed bin Khalifa bin Ahmed bin Salman bin Khalid bin Ali bin Khalifa Al Khalifa; March 11, 1972 (age 54) Manama, Bahrain
- Relations: Abdullah bin Khalifa bin Ahmed Al Khalifa (brother); Khalid bin Ahmed bin Salman Al Khalifa (uncle); House of Khalifa, Al Khawalid branch
- Children: Khalifa bin Mohammed Al Khalifa; Khalid Bin Mohammed Al Khalifa; Salman Bin Mohammed Al Khalifa; Ahmed Bin Mohammed Al Khalifa
- Parent: Khalifa bin Ahmed Al Khalifa (father)
- Education: King Fahd University of Petroleum and Minerals, University of Cambridge, DePaul University
- Occupation: Politician, minister of oil & gas
- Cabinet: Cabinet of Bahrain

Mohammed bin Khalifa bin Ahmed bin Salman bin Khalid bin Ali bin Khalifa Al Khalifa (Arabic: محمد بن خليفة بن أحمد بن سلمان بن خالد بن علي بن خليفة آل خليفة; born June 11, 1975) is a Bahraini politician, currently Minister of Oil and Gas. He was born in Manama, the nation's capital.

== Early life and education ==
Al Khalifa graduated with a Bachelor of Science with honors in electronics from King Fahd University of Petroleum and Minerals and went on to earn a postgraduate diploma from Cambridge University, a master's degree from Imperial College London, and a Master of Business Administration from Depaul University in Chicago.

== Political career ==
In 1999, Al Khalifa joined the Ministry of Finance & National Economy. In 2005, he was promoted to become Director of the Pensions Department. As an employee of the Ministry, he worked on major privatization projects for power stations, Seef Properties, and the Muharraq wastewater treatment plant. In 2011, he was appointed CEO of the nogaholding. In July 2015, he was appointed Chairman of the Bahrain Petroleum Company (Bapco). On July 16, 2019, as Minister of Oil and Gas, he relinquished the chairmanship and appointed Dr. Dawood Nassif in his place.

Previously, Al Khalifa had been a member of the Boards of Directors of the Bahrain National Gas Company, Aluminum Bahrain, and the Pearl Tourism Company. He is currently a member of the nogaholding and Central Bank of Bahrain Boards.

On June 5, 2016, amid a limited cabinet reshuffle, Al Khalifa was appointed Minister of Oil and Gas, succeeding Abdulhussain bin Ali Mirza, who was thus demoted from Minister of Energy overseeing that and electricity and water supply to just Minister of Electricity and Water Affairs. Highlights of his tenure so far on the construction side include preliminary work on expanding the oil refinery on the island of Sitra and finishing a new 350,000-barrel pipeline to carry enhanced production to Saudi Arabia. Meanwhile, studies are being conducted on extending existing pipelines, increasing production through the Khuff gas field, lifting tariffs on oil derivatives, exempting land transport and petroleum products from value-added tax, and signing a $300 million deal with the Saudi Fund for Development for local oil and gas projects.

== Personal life ==
His younger brother is Abdullah bin Khalifa bin Ahmed Al Khalifa, Chairman of the Board of Directors of Batelco; his father is Field Marshal Khalifa bin Ahmed Al Khalifa, Commander-in-Chief of the Bahrain Defence Force; and his uncle is Khalid bin Ahmed bin Salman Al Khalifa, Minister of the Royal Court. The latter two are considered patriarchs of the Al Khawalid branch that has taken over power from the late Prime Minister of Bahrain Khalifa bin Salman Al Khalifa.

== Honors ==
- Order of Merit, First Class (2013)

== See also ==
- National Oil & Gas Authority
