= Al Khawalid =

Branch of the House of Khalifa, the ruling family of Bahrain

Al Khawalid الخوالد
- Parent house: Al Khalifa
- Country: Bahrain
- Founder: Khalid bin Ali Al Khalifa

Al Khawalid (Arabic: الخوالد the Khawālid; literally "the Khālids"), also spelled Al Khawaled, is a branch of the House of Khalifa, the ruling family of Bahrain. Al Khawalid is most often used to refer collectively to descendants of Khalid bin Ali Al Khalifa, which they are named after. The term also refers to brothers Khalid bin Ahmed Al Khalifa, the Royal Court Minister and Khalifa bin Ahmed Al Khalifa the Commander in Chief of the Bahrain Defence Force. For the purpose of this article, immediate descendants of Khalid bin Ali Al Khalifa will be referred to as "the Khalids", the aforementioned two brothers will be referred to as "the Khawalid brothers" and the family branch collectively as "Al Khawalid". (Note: In his 1987 book, Bahrain, 1920-1945: Britain, the Shaikh, and the Administration, al-Tajer coined the term "the Khalids" to refer to immediate descendants of Khalid bin Ali Al Khalifa, long before terms Al Khawalid and the Khawalid came into use.)

The history of Al Khawalid dates to the 1920s, when the Khalids opposed the British-led administrative reforms and launched a military crackdown on the Shia who supported the reforms. The perpetrators were later put before a court that sentenced them to exile. They gradually returned to Bahrain, where they were kept outside government despite developing personal relations with those in power. They regained some influence since the late 1960s, but remained outside the inner decision-making circle. During this period, senior members of the Khalids were critical of the ruling family, opposed political reforms and held a grudge against the British.

The Khawalid brothers rose to power during the reign of King Hamad (1999–present), who they had a longstanding personal relationship with and whose mother belonged to their branch. They took up leading positions and controlled important institutions, becoming increasingly influential, with their power reportedly surpassing that of the Prime Minister (PM). The House of Khalifa is reported to have been split into a "moderate" faction led by the Crown Prince (CP) and a "hardline" faction led by the Khawalid brothers who share the same "anti-reform" agenda with the PM. In 2006, a report revealed an alleged secret plan by the Khawalid brothers which aimed to marginalize the Shia majority and identified one of their cousins as leader of the alleged conspiracy.

During the Bahraini uprising of 2011, the Khawalid brothers objected to compromise with the opposition and instead preferred crackdown. After a failed round of negotiations led by the CP, the Khawalid brothers led the crackdown, described as the widest in Bahrain's modern history. The Commander in Chief of the army, Khalifa bin Ahmed, was given wide authority with the announcement of martial law; he led a main crackdown operation, presided over military courts and made several interviews with regional and local media. Another Al Khawalid involved in the crackdown was the then-director of the National Security Agency, which was found to be responsible for arbitrary arrests and systematic torture. The crackdown empowered the Khawalid brothers faction further and marginalized the CP, who found himself and allies stripped from their powers.

The Khawalid brothers share an anti-West conservative ideology. They believe that the West is conspiring with Iran against Bahrain and other Gulf Cooperation Council countries and often accuse the United States of secretly supporting the Bahraini opposition. They are allied with Saudi Arabia and Sunni Islamist groups, and hold an anti-Shia ideology, viewing them as a fifth column to Iran. Based on their beliefs, the Khawalid brothers have pushed a security approach to deal with the Shia instead of political reforms, and have allegedly used sectarianism as a political tool.

== Nomenclature and genealogy ==
Al Khawalid, which literally means "the Khalids" is used mostly to refer to descendants of Khalid bin Ali Al Khalifa (1853–1925), the half-brother of Isa ibn Ali Al Khalifa (1848–1932), Bahrain's ruler between 1869 and 1923. They are a branch of the House of Khalifa that had ruled Bahrain since they led a coalition of Sunni tribes that invaded the country in 1783. Khalid, the eponymous forebear of Al Khawalid, was married to four women and had four sons and a daughter that survived him, Ibrahim (b. 1873), Salman (b. 1893), Ali (b. 1900), Najla (1901–39) and Abdulla (b. 1921 or 1922). He also had two other sons who had died by 1900, Ahmed (b. 1874) and an older Ali (b. 1876).

The term is also sometimes used to refer specifically to brothers Khalid (b. 1942) and Khalifa (b. 1946), sons of Ahmed bin Salman bin Khalid (died 2007). (Note: Khalid bin Ahmed bin Salman bin Khalid Al Khalifa, the Royal Court Minister is not to be confused with Khalid bin Ahmed bin Mohammed Al Khalifa, the Foreign Minister of Bahrain.) The latter two are usually connected with their maternal cousins, Mohamed and Ahmed (b. 1966) bin Ateyatalla Al Khalifa. The four of them are sometimes collectively known as sons of Al Suwaidi daughters (Arabic: أولاد بنات السويدي) as their mothers, Mariam and Moza bint Nasser Al Suwaidi, belong to the Al Suwaidi family. The two aforementioned sons of Ateyatalla Al Khalifa along with their half-brothers Salman and Abdulaziz bin Ateyatalla are sometimes included within the Khawalid brothers faction.

Al Khawalid family tree

Khalid Al Khalifa | Red: Top figure Blue: Senior figure
Ibrahim | Ahmed | Ali | Salman | Ali | Najla | Abdulla
Salman | Abdulla | Mohamed | Latifa* | Ahmed | Mohamed | Khalid** | Ali
Hessa*** | Hamad | Khalid | Abdulla | Khalid | Khalifa | Khalid
King Hamad | Ibrahim | Ibrahim | Hamad | Khalifa | Mohamed
Salman | Salman

*Wife of Salman bin Hamad Al Khalifa I, Bahrain's ruler (1942–61)
**Married to Mariam, sister of Khalifa bin Salman Al Khalifa, Bahrain's Prime Minister (1971–present)
***Only wife of Isa bin Salman Al Khalifa, Bahrain's ruler (1961–99)

Descendants of Al Suwaidi daughters

Nasser Al Suwaidi
Ahmed bin Salman Al Khalifa | Mariam | Moza | Ateyatalla Al Khalifa | Other wives
Khalid | Khalifa | Mohamed | Ahmed | Abdulaziz | Salman

== History ==
=== Administrative reforms ===
==== Context ====
The history of Al Khawalid dates back to the 1920s when the British were pushing for administrative reforms. The nature of the reforms, sometimes referred to as "reforms of the twenties" was administrative only, leaving out political issues such as legitimacy and public representation. They were mainly focused on reshuffling of public offices and economic resources. By 1921, the country was divided into two camps. The first supporting the reforms was composed of the elder son of the ruler and the heir apparent, Hamad ibn Isa Al Khalifa (1872–1942), the British political agent, Major C. K. Daly (1920–26) and the Shia, who at time composed about half of population. The opposing faction was composed of the ruler, Isa ibn Ali Al Khalifa, his younger son Abdulla, the Khalids and tribesmen of Sunni origin.

The heavily taxed Shia were desperate to get rid of the tribal regime and together with Major Daly claimed to be victims of corruption, mismanagement as well as "atrocities and oppression". The opposing faction rejected the reforms on the basis that equity and standardization of law would remove their advantages such as exemption from taxes and sovereignty over estates. A series of pro and anti reform petitions were submitted by the two factions to different British officials including the Foreign Office. However, the situation remained unchanged for two years as the British were hesitating.

==== Role of the Khalids ====
Khalid bin Ali, the Al Khawalid ancestor, was the governor of Riffa and ruled over Sitra and Nabih Saleh islands, and his elder son Ibrahim controlled Jabalat Habashi. The Khalids were known for being hard on the Shia. In 1923, the events took a new turn. Wanting to end the calls for reform, the Khalids and Al Dawasir tribe used armed tactics to intimidate reform supporters. The former's paramilitary forces numbered 100, about 20 percent of the total Al Khalifa manpower, while the latter had about 400 men.

Al Dawasir attacked Shia villages of Barbar and A'ali, while the Khalids attacked Sitra island. The attacks resulted in the killing of 12 villagers, burning of several houses and raping of women. The violence settled after Colonel Knox, the British acting Political Resident arrived in Bahrain in two gunships. Knox forced Isa bin Ali to abdicate in favor of his elder son, Hamad. The Khalids had agreed to reduce taxes on residents of Sitra following the visit. However, as soon as Knox had left, taxes were increased again, and Shia residents continued to be subjected to forced labor. The situation prompted some 500 Shia to hold a protest in front of the British Agency demanding a solution to the situation and equal taxation of citizens (several taxes were only imposed on the Shia).

Writing for the Journal of Arabian Studies, Justin Gengler argues that the reason behind the involvement of the Khalids was probably their father's ambition to hold a senior position if they succeeded in stopping reforms and placing Abdulla bin Isa as ruler. Gengler added:

When in 1869 the British selected Shaikh ʿĪsā bin ʿAlī as the next ruler of Bahrain ... Shaikh Khālid, was obliged to accept the governorship of Rifā ... [he] could hope to gain immensely if the final defeat of the reforms were accompanied ... thereby rectifying the historical accident by which he was sidelined from power more than fifty years earlier.

The petitions and political crisis continued to the reign of Hamad (1923–42) who —encouraged by the British— began it by setting up a criminal court to try those involved in the violence including his first cousins, the Khalids. The ruler was put in a dilemma between his tribal alignment and public law, and so he exiled his cousins, but paid their expenses. The Khalids, however, held a deep grudge against residents of Sitra who witnessed against them, and in 1924 attacked the island before their exile, killing several Shia men, women and children. The attackers were sentenced to death following major Shia protests and a lengthy second trial, but managed to escape before the sentence was carried out. Their father was confined to Manama. The trials marked the first time in Bahrain's history that members of the ruling family were convicted.

=== 1924–99 ===
Gradually, the Khalids were pardoned and allowed back to Bahrain after the leaders of the Shia community in Sitra were persuaded that the Khalids would not attack their villages again. Ibrahim bin Khalid, the eldest of the Khalids, who was exiled to Zubarah (Qatar) for 10 years, was convicted in 1929 of being responsible for a failed assassination attempt on the ruler, his first cousin, in 1926. Instead of getting tried, the ruler appointed Ibrahim at his Sakhir Palace. His brother Salman, originally exiled for 10 years, was allowed back in 1928, while Abdulla was probably not exiled as he was an infant when the 1923 and 1924 incidents occurred.

Still, the Khalids were kept outside the inner decision-making circle until the reign of Hamad bin Isa Al Khalifa (1999–present). They were also kept away from government positions when Charles Belgrave was the adviser of the ruler (1926–57) as "the colonial administration [did] not see fit to re-empower the most militant opponents of [the administrative reforms]," Gengler explained. Other factors that kept the Khalids away from power was their relative lack of efficiency to head the new specialized offices and their self-isolation due to "lingering enmity toward the British as well as to some in the ruling branch of the Āl Khalīfa". They however had personal links with the center of power as two rulers, Salman bin Hamad Al Khalifa I (1942–61) and his son Isa bin Salman Al Khalifa (1961–99) had married from them: Latifa bint Ibrahim bin Khalid and Hessa bint Salman bin Ibrahim bin Khalid respectively. The latter is the mother of the current King of Bahrain, Hamad bin Isa.

The first return of the Khalids to government was in 1967, when Abdulla bin Khalid was appointed as Minister of Municipalities and Rural Affairs. In 1973, he was given the Ministry of Justice and Islamic Affairs which he kept until a cabinet reshuffle in November 2002. During the 1970s, Abdulla opposed the constitutional reforms that paved the road to the short-lived 1973–5 parliament. He was also critical of the ruling family, highlighting their "rampant economic exploitation" and "expropriat[ion] [of Shia farmers] properties". Abdulla's older brother, Salman was also critical of the ruling family. Salman and his sons however did not head top positions during the reign of Isa bin Salman, either due to refusing such positions or to not being offered them as a result of Salman's criticism of the family. Salman was particularly noted to hate the British and parts of the ruling family.

== Return to power ==
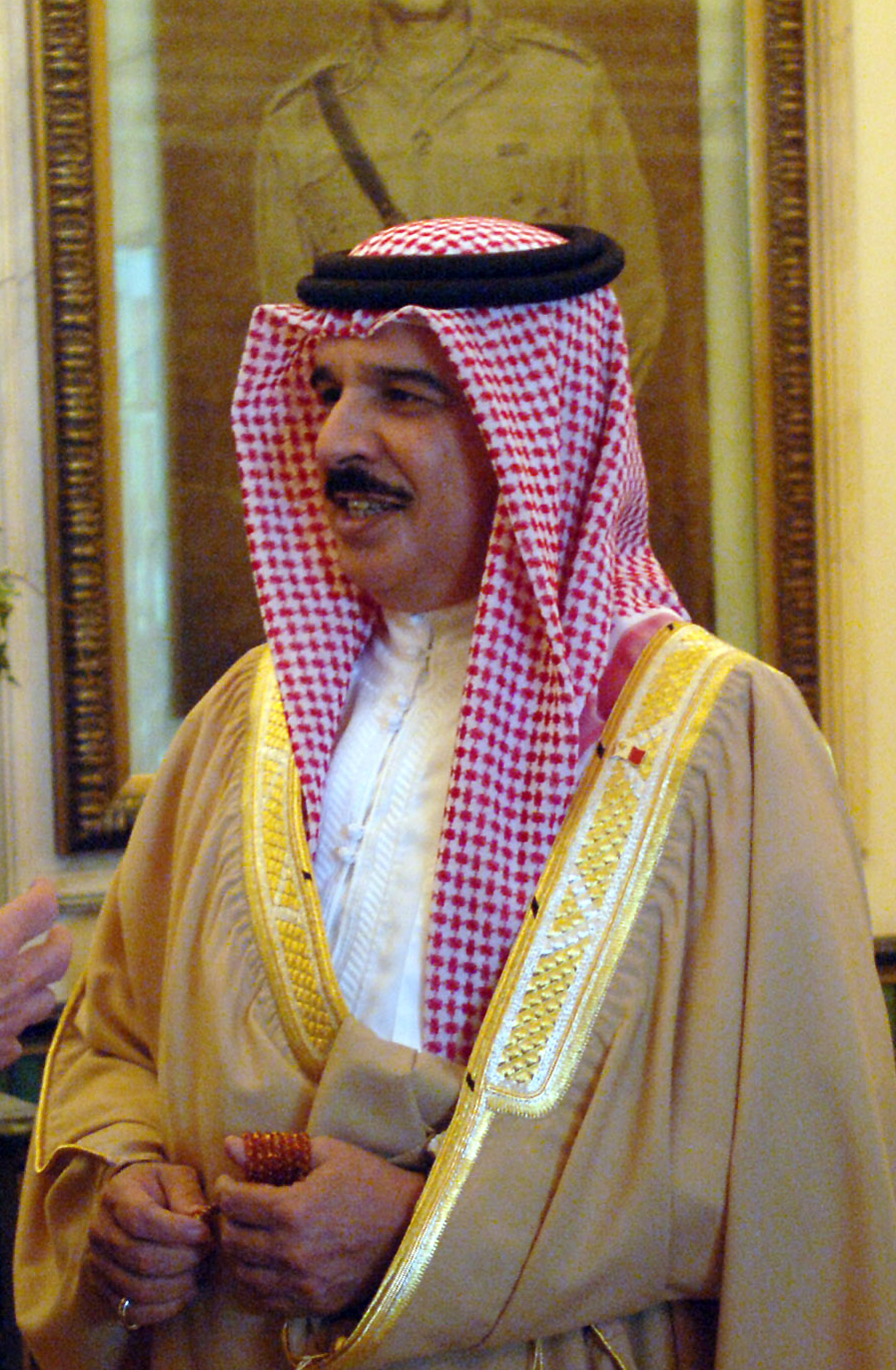
Hamad bin Isa Al Khalifa, King of Bahrain

Following the sudden death of his father in March 1999, Hamad bin Isa became the ruler of Bahrain. The new leader's mother, Hessa belonged to the Al Khawalid branch. During the early years of his reign, Hamad initiated a series of reforms including releasing of political prisoners and allowing exiles to return. However, by 2007 he had retracted from "many of his earlier reforms". The Khawalid brothers (Khalid and Khalifa, sons of Ahmed bin Salman bin Khalid) had strong relations with the king, that date to 1965. According to The Wall Street Journal (WSJ), Hamad, then 15 years old, was the heir apparent, when Khalid bin Ahmed, then 21 years old was named the vizier (head) of Crown Prince's Court. Abdulhadi Khalaf dismissed this statement as "too fanciful". In 1968, Hamad tasked Khalid's younger brother, Khalifa—who is said to have bicycled with Hamad during college years—with helping build the Bahrain Defence Force. During the 1973 Arab–Israeli War, Khalifa was promoted to the position of Chief-of-Staff of the army. In his 1994 book First Light: Modern Bahrain and Its Heritage, Hamad introduced Khalifa as "my brother and colleague".

It was during Hamad's reign (1999–present) that Al Khawalid had regained their influence in the inner decision-making circle. "Shaikh Hamad ... oversaw and ... has continued to oversee their empowerment," Gengler wrote. They occupied leading positions and led important institutions, including the National Security Agency (NSA), the Judiciary and Central Informatics Organization. Abdulla bin Khalid, the youngest son of Khalid bin Ali, headed the "supreme committee" tasked with drafting the National Action Charter of Bahrain between 1999 and 2000. In 2002, he was removed from his position as Minister of Justice and Islamic Affairs which he headed since the 1970s and instead placed as Minister of Islamic Affairs and second Deputy Prime Minister. In 2006, he lost his cabinet positions and headed the Supreme Council for Islamic Affairs. Abdulla was a senior member of House of Khalifa, being one of only three to have the title His Highness at the time of his death in 2018.

Khalid bin Ahmed became the Royal Court Minister in 1999. In a 2007 leaked diplomatic cable, the U.S. ambassador noted that King Hamad "[did] little to reign in Shaikh Khalid" and instead allowed him to "call the shots" and "crack down hard on the demonstrators". It also named Khalid as "one of the key hard-liners". The same cable quoted Mansoor al-Jamri, the editor-in-chief of Al-Wasat newspaper, as calling Khalid the "de facto PM". Michael Field mentioned that Khalid was very powerful and "control[led] access to the King".

Khalid's younger brother, Khlifa, became the Defence Minister and Commander in Chief of the army. He was later promoted to Supreme Commander of the Armed Forces and given the rank of Field Marshal (al-Mushīr; Arabic: المشير) by which he is widely known. The defense budget rose from US$406 million in 2001 to US$883 million in 2011. The ~118% increase is unmatched by any country in the region except for the war-torn Iraq. Bahraini writer Abbas Al-Murshed cited a 2008 royal order that prevented the Parliament from questioning al-Mushīr about the military budget as a sign for the growing influence of the Khawalid brothers.

Frederic Wehrey wrote that the Khawalid brothers were now even stronger than the Prime Minister (PM). Nabeel Rajab said that the two were now the de facto rulers of Bahrain. Bahrain Mirror said the Khawalid brothers were so strong that they represented a "new royal family". The same source referred to Khalid bin Ahmed as the "Minister King". The Khawalid brothers, their grand uncle Abdulla bin Khalid and his son Khalid are also members of the Royal Family Council.

Other notable Al Khawalid who occupied leading positions include Mohamed bin Khalifa bin Ahmed, the CEO of National Oil and Gas Authority and director of Central Bank of Bahrain, Mohamed bin Abdulla bin Khalid, the Chairman of the Supreme Council of Health and Minister of State for Defense Affairs, his brother Khalid, the Deputy PM and the chairman of Bahrain Mumtalakat Holding Company, Al Khalifa Housing Committee and Seef Mall. The latter is said to be Al Khawalid candidate for succeeding the PM. Their nephew Khalid bin Ali is the current Minister of Justice who lived most of his life in Egypt where he was born to an Egyptian mother before returning to Bahrain in 1999. From decedents of Ibrahim bin Khalid, notable Al Khawalid include Khalifa bin Abdulla bin Mohamed, the Secretary General of Supreme Defence Council and previously head of NSA (2008–11).

Khalifa's brother, Hamad, is the chairman of Bahrain Telecommunications Company; their cousin, Ibrahim bin Khalid, is the General Director of Ruling Family Council; and finally, Salman bin Ibrahim bin Hamad bin Abdulla is the current President of the Asian Football Federation. From sons of Ateyatalla Al Khalifa, Abdulaziz, a security adviser in Prime Minister's Court became the head of NSA (2002–5), Mohamed became the president of Central Statistics Bureau and Royal Court until 2010, Ahmed became Minister of Cabinet Affairs and Director of Central Statistics Bureau until 2011, and Salman became head of Bahrain Defence Force Hospital, later head of King Hamad University Hospital and member of Supreme Council of Health.

=== Internal rift ===
Following their return to leading positions, the Khawalid brothers became "engaged in a huge battle for control of the family", said Kristian Coates-Ulrichsen of London's Chatham House. Foreign observers such as Emile Nakhleh as well as palace insiders expressed their concern that the Khawalid brothers might go as far as shifting the royal succession line towards themselves. Unnamed U.S. officials downplayed the likelihood of such a change. The division in the ruling family became very clear when an anonymous non-Al Khawalid "senior royal" made an interview with the Wall Street Journal, saying "surrounding the king are all powerful Khawalids."

King of Bahrain and several Al Khawalids declined to comment on the story. However, one of the king's top advisers said to be close to Al Khawalid told the Wall Street Journal that it was exaggerated and it was probably no more than competition for succession of the elderly PM. "This is healthy debate, not a blood vendetta from fairy tales," he added. An investigation committee was reportedly formed to identify the sources that leaked out the information to the WSJ.

On one hand the Khawalid brothers faction, led by Khalid bin Ahmed, represent the "hard-liners", while on the other hand, the Crown Prince (CP) Salman bin Hamad Al Khalifa is seen as leader of the "moderates", the Los Angeles Times (LAT) reported. According to Jane Kinninmont of Chatham House, the "king is not seen as leaning towards any particular ideology, but as the ruler he is the key person whom the other factions seek to influence". It was previously thought that the PM, Khalifa bin Salman Al Khalifa was the head of the first camp; however in recent years with the rise of the Khawalid brothers, this picture "now appears over-simplistic," Kinninmont added. The Economist Intelligence Unit mentioned that the royal family was now split into three factions, one led by the CP, one led by the PM and one led by the Khawalid brothers. Khalil al-Marzooq of Al Wefaq supported the aforementioned statement and named Khalid bin Ahmed as head of the third faction.

Before the 2011 uprising, the Khawalid brothers had tense relations with the PM and both sides hated each other. Bahrain Mirror reported that the PM has expressed his hate for the Khawalid brothers several times to the audience of his council and refused to cooperate with ministers under their influence such as Ahmed bin Ateyatalla. However, following the start of the uprising, their relations are reported to have been improved. Brothers Khalid and Khalifa, and the PM are said to form an "anti-reform troika". The latter, however, is considered to be "more politically flexible".

=== Al Bandar report ===
In 2006, Salah Al Bandar, then an adviser to the Cabinet Affairs Ministry distributed a 240–page scandalous report, revealing an alleged Khawalid-led political conspiracy aiming to disenfranchise and marginalize the Shia majority, and to minimize the influence of "reformers in the ruling family". One of the strategies of the alleged conspiracy was to naturalize Sunnis in order to re-shift the demographic balance. Other strategies included stroking sectarianism in the media, use of GONGOs and rigging the parliamentary election. The report named Ahmed bin Ateyatalla as head of the conspiracy by leading an "underground network" that aims "to override the legal legitimacy, falsify popular will and vilify civil organizations". The latter was described as being an "influential hardliner" and a "protégé" of Khalid bin Ahmed.

A total of US$2.65 million was reportedly dispersed to various contributors. The report said the origins of the conspiracy stemmed from a secret study by an Iraqi academic in 2005 that recommended marginalizing the Shia to the government. Al Bandar was deported and his report banned from any mention in the media and Parliament. Ateyatalla denied the allegations and called them "an Iran-backed effort to destabilize Bahrain". The government however charged Al Bandar in absentia with "possessing stolen government documents". Kinninmont said the charge "only added to perceptions that the documents were credible". She added that the claim gained more credence in 2008 when the government published new demographic data which showed that over 70,000 were naturalized in the previous seven years. The Los Angeles Times said Al Bandar report was the first evidence "of government support for Sunni extremists".

== Bahraini uprising ==
=== Context ===
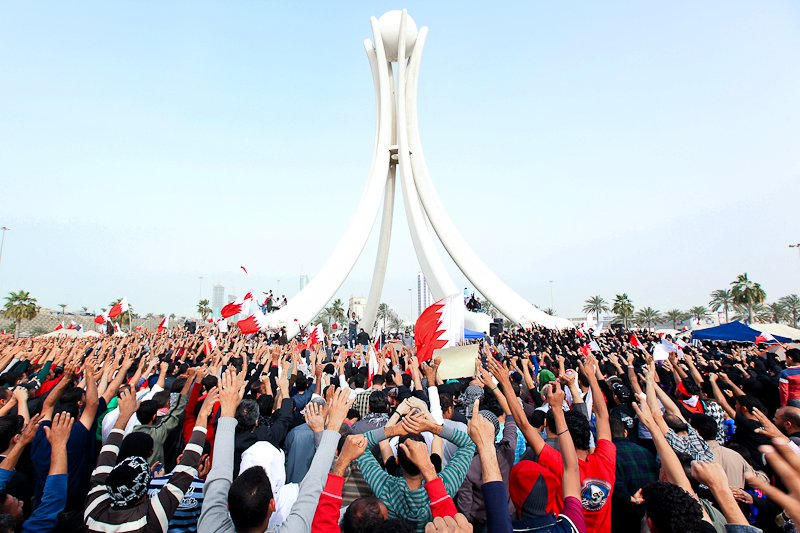
Protests at Pearl Roundabout in February 2011

Inspired by popular uprisings in Tunisia and Egypt, protesters in Bahrain took to the streets in a "Day of Rage" on 14 February 2011. Security forces responded by firing tear gas, rubber bullets, sound bombs and birdshot into the crowd of protesters, killing one of them. The next day another protester was killed and thousands of demonstrators occupied Pearl Roundabout in the capital Manama. On 17 February, authorities launched a pre-dawn raid on protesters makeshift camp in Pearl Roundabout, which left four protesters dead and more than 300 injured.

The following day, army forces stationed in the Pearl Roundabout fired live ammunition on hundreds of protesters who tried to re-occupy the site. At least 120 protesters were hurt and one was fatally wounded, bringing the number of deaths to seven. The CP offered dialogue with opposition parties. On 19 February, tens of thousands of protesters re-occupied Pearl Roundabout after the army was ordered to withdraw. In March, martial law was declared and Saudi troops were called in. Despite the hard crackdown and official ban, the protests continued.

=== Role of the Khawalid brothers ===
The divisions within the royal family of Al Khalifa came to public during the uprising. The king with his elder son and heir apparent, Salman were responding positively to U.S. pressure to compromise with the opposition, while the Khawalid brothers preferred crackdown. In February and March 2011, the CP was authorized by his father to lead "semi-secret" negotiations with the opposition in which he offered them "historic concessions, including a bigger share in parliament." According to Bahrain Mirror, the CP move surprised the Khawalid brothers and aimed among other things to limit their influence. During this period, Ahmed bin Ateyatalla lost his position as Minister of Cabinet Affairs in a limited cabinet reshuffle aimed to satisfy the opposition which has repeatedly accused him of discriminating against Shia. The cabinet reshuffle also introduced Majeed Al Alawi, an adviser to the CP as Minister of Housing.

According to sources interviewed by the WSJ, the Khawalid brothers rejected the CP deal, which led to a "confrontation between the crown prince and the Royal Court Minister at a family meeting". According to same sources, Khalid bin Ahmed then went to Saudi Arabia and convinced their king to oppose the deal secured by the CP. (Note: Bahrain Mirror supported this account. However, in their 2011 documentary, Bahrain: Shouting in the Dark, Al Jazeera English mentioned that it was king Hamad who traveled to Saudi Arabia. Other sources maintain that king Hamad is the one who officially invited Saudi forces, however Gwynne Dyer wrote that "[u]nofficially, he [the king] probably had no choice." The Guardian mentioned it was the CP who was expected to invite Saudi Arabia forces. The International Crisis Group mentioned that the rivals of PM accused him of communicating with Nayef bin Abdulaziz Al Saud, then interior minister of Saudi Arabia. The Belgium-based NGO added that Saudi Arabia "likely did not need much of a push" in order to intervene in Bahrain.) After that, the sources mention, the Khawalid brothers-led security forces attacked protesters and the talks fell apart. A source close to the Khawalid brothers dismissed the aforementioned narrative and blamed the failure of talks on the opposition rejection of the CP deal. (Note: According to the Bahrain Independent Commission of Inquiry, on 13 March, Al Wefaq had set a pre-condition of electing a constitutional assembly. The International Crisis Group has published a more detailed account.) Ali Salman, the head of Al Wefaq main opposition party said they had accepted the CP initiative, but "12 hours later, GCC troops came in and severed the dialogue." (Note: According to Abduljalil Khalil of Al Wefaq and a Bahraini diplomat, the CP had been given six weeks to secure a deal with the opposition. The diplomat said the opposition should not have though the period of talks was over when the Peninsula Shield Force entered Bahrain, however Ali Al-Aswad of Al Wefaq said that on the same day (14 March), they were told by CP representatives he "no longer had the authority to negotiate with them".) According to the WSJ, the Khawalid brothers also effectively blocked any direct dialogue between the CP and the opposition beyond the failed February–March 2011 talks.

On 15 March, the king announced a three-month "State of National Safety", granting al-Mushīr, Khalifa bin Ahmed wide-ranging powers including the authority "to issue regulations governing all manner of conduct". The aforementioned Royal Decree also authorized al-Mushīr "to oversee the implementation of this decree by all the agencies of the Government of Bahrain". He led the operation to clear Pearl Roundabout of protesters in the early hours of 16 March. Eight people had died that day, five by gunshot, one by birdshot and two police reportedly run over by an SUV.

Al-Mushīr frequently appeared on local and regional media. In one interview he called protesters "traitors". In another, he echoed Muammar Gaddafi by accusing protesters of using drugs. "[Protesters were] given pills which affected their minds and made them do unusual things," Al-Mushīr said. He also had a warning for protesters: "I say to those who did not get the message, 'If you return we will come back, stronger this time'." He said that the Bahraini uprising was "by all measures a conspiracy involving Iran with the support of the United States". He also said that the uprising which he called a "coup plot" was supported by more than a dozed of U.S.- and an unnamed Gulf country-funded NGOs.

In later days, Bahrain was engulfed in the Khawalid brothers-led-crackdown with almost daily clashes between security forces and opposition activists. The crackdown was the widest against the opposition in Bahrain's modern history; dozens of protesters were killed, some due to torture in police custody. Thousands of Shia were expelled from their jobs and dozens of their mosques were demolished. Al-Mushīr also presided over the Court of National Safety, a military court that convicted more than 500 defendants, including all opposition leaders outside Al Wefaq (i.e. Bahrain Thirteen). "The different style of the crackdown reflected a different leadership calling the shots," said Kinninmont. The Independent reported that continued crackdown and the Saudi-led intervention has increased the influence of al-Mushīr, which it named "the leading hardliner within the royal family". Professor Michael Hudson said that the "crackdown mark[ed] the victory of the hard-liners within the royal establishment".

The NSA, then led by a member of Al Khawalid branch, Khalifa bin Abdulla Al Khalifa, played an important role in crackdown. It was found by the Bahrain Independent Commission of Inquiry (BICI) that the NSA had executed hundreds of arbitrary arrests during which they used "unnecessary excessive force", "terror-inspiring behaviour" and damaged properties. The BICI also found that NSA had subjected detainees to systematic torture which led to the death of four detainees, among them journalists Karim Fakhrawi and Zakariya al-Ashiri. Following the release of the BICI report, Khalifa bin Abdulla was removed from his position and given the positions of king adviser and Secretary General of the Supreme Defense Council. According to Kinninmont, "he is believed still to be closely involved with the agency".

Martial law was lifted on 1 June and was followed by a call from the king to a national dialogue. The failure of the dialogue had only served to deepen the divide between the Al Khalifa branches, Ulrichsen wrote. According to Kinninmont and WSJ sources, the CP was sidelined as his allies were removed from their influential positions and his "de facto parallel cabinet" (known as the Economic Development Board) was stripped from its powers. Wehrey writes that the king himself "has been similarly overshadowed". The Khawalid brothers influence had increased even more after the uprising. Ateyatalla, who had lost his cabinet position during the early days of the uprising was now appointed Minister of Follow Up at the Royal Court. In January 2012, the Khawalid brothers wanted to initiate talks, however they soon abandoned the idea after opposition from "pro-government Sunni radicals".

The CP finally called for a renewed dialogue in December, yet his speech "contained generous nods to the Khawalid [brothers'] influence". The new dialogue began in February 2013, however the CP did not participate, despite opposition calls for him. Al-Mushīr's spokesman tweeted that participants in the talks were "donkeys" and warned that any concession would amount to a "coup". The appointment of CP as Deputy PM in March raised some hopes; it was welcomed by Mansoor al-Jamri and a "moderate" government adviser. "This is an important step that could represent the starting point for meaningful reform later on," al-Jamri said. The Economist Intelligence Unit mentioned that this placed the CP as first candidate to succeed the PM. However, the CP remained "utterly sidelined," Gengler said. Christopher Davidson cautioned that the move can be used as a public relations stunt. "[W]hether this is a meaningful political concession remains to be seen," he added.

== Ideology and political allies ==
=== Anti-West conservatives ===
According to Freedom House, the Khawalid brothers represent and promote "an ideological orientation that sees Bahrain as the target of Iranian-and Western-backed conspiracies to empower Bahraini Shiites at the expense of the ruling family and other Gulf Sunnis". The U.S. toppling of Sunni leaders in Afghanistan (Taliban) and Iraq (Saddam Hussein), and its relative military inaction towards nuclear-ambitious Iran have only deepened the Khawalid brothers ideology, which is already rich with the experience of the 1920s British-driven administrative reforms that came at their expense.

In an interview with al-Rai Kuwaiti newspaper, Al-Mushīr considered the Arab Spring movements in Tunisia, Egypt, Yemen, Bahrain and Libya to be a "Western conspiracy". He only acknowledged the Syrian civil war as true popular revolution and hinted that GCC troops may get involved there. "If Iran's mercenaries are not defeated in Syria, they will come to us in the Gulf," he added. In a March 2012 interview, al-Mushīr accused the U.S. of secretly supporting the Bahraini opposition and "sow[ing] discord among the Gulf states". He protested the U.S. halting their supply of crowd-control weapons by denying U.S. aircraft basing access. The move was described by Wehrey as "effectively overruling the king".

The Khawalid brothers were classified by the WSJ as "anti-American hard-liners". The Independent said the "ultraconservative" Khawalid had close tries with Saudi Arabia, "vehemently opposed to any concessions" to the opposition and "pushed an increasingly sectarian and conservative agenda". "Bahrain’s chief allies in London and Washington are beginning to fear that the normally pro-West monarchy is being usurped by a group with virulently anti-American and anti-British views," the London-based newspaper added.

Al-Monitor mentioned that brothers Khalid and Khalifa bin Ahmed were allied with Sunni Islamists groups including Al Asalah (Salafist), Al-Menbar Islamic Society (Muslim Brotherhood) and the National Unity Assembly (Independent). Saeed al-Shehabi of the London-based Bahrain Freedom Movement said the UK preferred to deal with moderates instead of the Khawalid brothers. "But the Khawalid [brothers] get their support from Saudi Arabia which has left the British in a sort of limbo," he added. According to LAT, the Khawalid brothers faction "believes in suppressing Shiite aspirations, even if it means supporting Sunni groups propelled by the same ideologies that inspire Osama bin Laden". The Los Angeles-based newspaper added that Akhbar Al Khaleej, a pro-government newspaper "refers to Bin Laden as a 'sheik,' a title of honor".

A newspaper controlled by the Khawalid brothers published the name and image of a U.S. diplomat after he had given doughnuts to protesters outside the U.S. embassy in Manama. The newspaper portrayed him as an Israeli-Irani intelligence agent, forcing the embassy to send him home "out of safety fears". The same newspaper criticized the U.S. alleged support to protesters by featuring a series of articles on the President of the United States titled "Ayatollah Obama and Bahrain". Gengler identified the aforementioned paper as Al-Watan and added that the writer of "Ayatollah Obama" series was praised by al-Mushīr and promoted to Editor-in-Chief a year later.

The Khawalid brothers rising influence and divisions within House of Khalifa prompted two former U.S. officials to say that "it may not be viable to continue to base thousands of U.S. service members and their families there" and the Carnegie Endowment for International Peace called the U.S. to "prepare plans for the gradual relocation of the Fifth Fleet's assets and functions". On the other hand, Simon Henderson wrote that relocating the fifth fleet would only serve to embolden the Khawalid brothers. "The Khawalid [brothers] faction in Manama may even relish that prospect as a means of clarifying the royal family's predicament and justifying the hardline path," he added.

=== Sectarianism ===
In 1995, one year after the start of the Shia-led 1990s uprising in Bahrain, Khalid bin Ahmed publicly distributed a "politically charged poem" that contained "racist and hateful views" of the Shia. One verse of the poem called for "spill[ing] their bloods until they all die", another called for "remov[ing] them from every sensitive position". Khalaf said the poem was "part of the tribal-cum-ethnic-cum-political mobilization and counter mobilization". According to Michael Field, Khalid "[h]as reputation for being very hard on the Shias". Freedom House mentioned that the Khawalid brothers "espouse a decidedly anti-Shiite agenda, conceiving of the community as a veritable fifth column to be dealt with in the framework of security, rather than through political bargaining". The sectarian violence and rise of Shia powers in Iraq have only strengthened this belief. This view of Shia as a security problem led the Khawalid brothers to consider any economic and political reforms as invalid. Instead they thought that these reforms would only lead the Shia to demand even more.

"[B]y this view, the state [is] trapped in a veritable catch-22, wherein the very attempt to purchase political stability in fact serves only to open the door to increased instability," Gengler wrote. The Khawalid brothers have allegedly undertaken preemptive measures to limit the Shia majority influence via excluding them from sensitive positions (sovereign ministries, police and army), naturalizing Sunnis to re-balance the demographics, gerrymandering electoral districts and mobilizing the Sunni public opinion against the Shia. The first evidence of these policies was presented by al-Jamri in 1998, later in 2006 they were further exposed by Al Bandar report. "While the exclusion of the Shiite minority from the public sphere has been accomplished in Saudi Arabia through instrumentalization of Wahhabi ideology and institutions, the exclusion of a majority within Bahrain will likely be much more difficult to sustain," Diwan said.

Wehrey wrote that during the Bahraini uprising, the Khawalid brothers —aided by their Sunni allies, the Muslim Brotherhood and Salafists— made good use of sectarianism to delegitimize the Shia opposition and prevent any "broad-based, grassroots movement" from forming. He added that they employed the state-controlled and Khawalid-funded newspaper, Al-Watan to portrait "Al Wefaq as a proxy of Hezbollah and Iran". The opposition said that sectarian groups were mainly supported by Khalid bin Ahmed, who they considered "particularly potent and harmful". A Congressional Research Service report mentioned that the Khawalid brothers "are considered disparaging of and implacably opposed to compromise with the Shiites".

== Analysis ==
Whether ... King Hamad has lost the internal Āl Khalīfa battle for political direction, or that he has come over to the view of those who advocate a more security-based approach, the result is the same: in the absence of a basic change in strategy or power relations, Bahrain will seek to contain its Shīʿa-led reform movement primarily within a security, rather than a political, framework, believing that stability can be achieved only through such means.

— Justin Gengler

Gengler argued that King Hamad's empowerment of the Khawalid brothers was not because he was unaware of their anti-reform ideology and actions, nor was it due to him being a wolf in sheep's clothing. Instead Gengler wrote that King Hamad probably wanted to counter the influence of his uncle, the strong un-elected PM, Khalifa bin Salman who was an "effective co-ruler" between 1971 and 1999. Gengler concludes that the rise of the Khawalid brothers "owes therefore to a combination of personal relationships, shared background in the military, and political expediency". Other explanations Gengler offered include that "[King Hamad] simply never took an interest in ruling" and instead occupied himself with "recreation and hobbies" or that he had begun the security approach in parallel with reforms as a "precautionary measure" in case they failed.

Bahrain Mirror mentioned that the king has delegated "[a]uthority and affairs of the state" to the Khawalid brothers "to fully manage them as they wish". Gwynne Dyer wrote that as long as Al Khalawid remained in power "there will be no compromise, even though more than 80 Shia protesters have already been killed". Writing for Bahrain Mirror, Bahraini researcher Yousif Makki argued that the role of the Khawalid brothers was amplified and that they did not constitute a faction of their own. Instead Makki said they were within the faction led by the PM.

On the other hand, Bahraini writer Abbas Busafwan argued that the Khawalid brothers are the king's crew and allegations made against them, including Al Bandar report are no more than the king's own projects. He argued that the early reforms initiated by the king (known as "the reform project") only aim was "re-concentrating power in his hand, away from the PM, and not for the creation of a popular partnership and a democratic life". Busafwan added that Khalid bin Ahmed and Ahmed bin Ateyatalla were responsible for the formation and implementation of what he called the "Hamad strategy". He did not conciser the CP a moderate, instead he said the CP was "unable to form a balance with the powerful Al-Khawaled".
