= Abdulhussain =

Abdulhussain is a given name. Notable people with the name include:

- Abdulhussain Abdulredha (1939–2017), Kuwaiti actor
- Abdulhussain bin Ali Mirza, Bahraini politician
