= Ali al-Ghanmi =

Bahraini former policeman (born 1987)

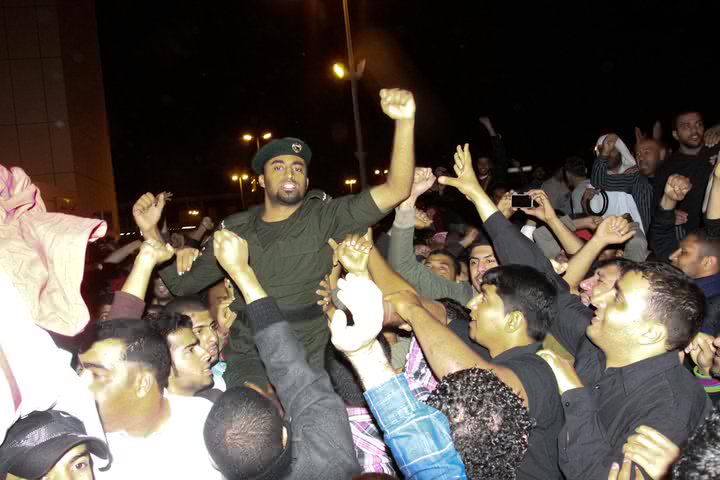
- Ali al-Ghanmi joining protests
- Born: c. 1987
- Occupation: Police officer
- Known for: Defection from police during 2011 Bahraini uprising

Ali Jassim al-Ghanmi (Arabic: علي جاسم الغانمي) (born c. 1987) is a Bahraini former policeman who came to public attention for leaving his post and joining protesters in February 2011 of the Bahraini uprising (2011–present). On 9 January 2012, he was sentenced to 12 years' imprisonment.

== Pearl Roundabout incident ==
In February 2011, large-scale pro-democracy protests began in Bahrain as part of the international Arab Spring. The center of the protests was Pearl Roundabout in Manama, which protesters compared to Tahrir Square in the recent Egyptian revolution. The roundabout saw several battles between protesters and police, including a 17 February pre-dawn raid that killed four protesters and injured one hundred more. After seeing the violence, al-Ghanmi left his guard post and joined the crowd, announcing to them that he could no longer support "a killer institution". The crowd hoisted him on their shoulders, and al-Ghanmi became an immediate "mini-celebrity" of the protest movement.

In the month that followed, al-Ghanmi criticized Hamad bin Isa Al Khalifa, the King of Bahrain, at a series of rallies. According to an activist interviewed by BBC News, approximately two hundred police followed al-Ghanmi's example and defected, almost all of whom were also later arrested. Human Rights First described him as a hero of the Arab Spring for his actions during the protests.

== Arrest and trial ==
In March 2011, the government of Bahrain brought Gulf Co-operation Council troops led by Saudi Arabian forces into the country to battle the protesters, and the protesters were dislodged from the Pearl Roundabout. Al-Ghanmi went into hiding to avoid the crackdown. His family alleged that they were threatened in an effort to make them reveal his whereabouts. Al-Ghanmi was discovered and arrested on 4 May.

From September 2011 to January 2012, al-Ghanmi was held in solitary confinement, allegedly for shouting "Down, down, Hamad" in the prison yard. In December 2011, al-Ghanmi's lawyer alleged that al-Ghanmi had been subject to insults, abuse, and beatings by his guards.

On 9 January 2012, al-Ghanmi was sentenced to twelve years' imprisonment by a military court for having defected from the police: two years for "disturbing the peace", three years for "incitement to hatred against the government", and seven and a half years for his going absent without leave and his participation in the rallies.

== Responses ==
Al Wefaq, Bahrain's main opposition party, said that al-Ghanmi arrest is "yet another proof that the government only recognizes Bassiouni Report when it comes to official statements for media consumption".

== Personal life ==
Al-Ghanmi is married and has a daughter.
