= Bapco Energies =

Bahraini petroleum industry agency

- بابكو انرجيز

Agency overview
- Formed: 2007
- Preceding agency: National Oil and Gas Authority
- Jurisdiction: Government of Bahrain
- Headquarters: 18th Floor, GBCORP Tower, Building No. 1411, Road No. 4626, Block 346, Bahrain Financial Harbour District, Sea Front, Bahrain
- Ministers responsible: Shaikh Nasser bin Hamad Al Khalifa, Chairman of the Board of Directors; Dr. Mohamed bin Mubarak Bin Daina, Managing Director
- Agency executive: Mark Thomas, Chief Executive Officer
- Website: www.bapcoenergies.com

Bapco Energies (Note: The company name is stylized all lower-case.) (Arabic: بابكو انرجيز), formerly nogaholding, is an agency within the Ministry of Oil and Environment of Bahrain whose mission is to develop the nation's petroleum resources. Established in 2007 as a unit of the National Oil and Gas Authority (NOGA), the government's petroleum regulator, it became an independent agency when NOGA was abolished in September 2021.

== Agency overview ==
Bapco Energies was established in August 2007 as a subsidiary unit of the National Oil and Gas Authority (NOGA), the Government of Bahrain's petroleum industry regulator. Bapco Energies was intended to concentrate and refocus NOGA's oil, gas, and petrochemical development activities. NOGA was abolished in September 2021. Bapco Energies became a semi-independent agency within Bahrain's Ministry of Oil and Gas.

As of 2022, Bapco Energies owned two corporate subsidiaries and had assets of more than US$10.2 billion.

== Corporate history ==
In December 2015, Bapco Energies signed an agreement with Teekay Corp., a Canadian-based petroleum shipping firm, to build a liquified natural gas (LNG) import terminal in Bahrain. To fund this project, Bapco Energies issued US$570 million in sukuk (bonds which are sharia-compliant) in March 2016. Some of the funds were also used for modernization projects at Bahrain Petroleum Company (BAPCO) and at Bahrain's natural gas processing plant. Bapco Energies formed a joint venture, Bahrain LNG, to operate the LNG terminal, in which Teekay held a 30 percent interest, and Samsung and GIC each held another 20 percent. A US$98.7 million contract was signed in October 2016 with JGC Corp. of Japan to build a new storage and pipeline facility at the natural gas processing facility.

The LNG terminal, located at the city of Al Hidd, opened in May 2019. The terminal consisted of a Floating Storage Unit (FSU) constructed and modified by Teekay, a breakwater and receiving jetty, a regasification platform, a pipeline to bring natural gas onshore from the regasification platform, an onshore gas storage facility, and a nitrogen production plant. The plant has a capacity of 22,653,500 cubic metres (800,000,000 cu ft) per day. Bapco Energies raised another US$1 billion in sukuk in October 2018.

In November 2020, Bahrain adopted a strategy for supplying homes, industry, and government buildings with natural gas. The strategy called for the construction of a national natural gas grid and for the construction of pipelines with other Gulf Cooperation Council member nations to supply the grid with gas. Bapco Energies signed an agreement with Chevron Corporation to jointly study the nation's future natural gas needs and from where Bahrain should obtain supplies. The same month, Bapco Energies contracted with Air Products, an American corporation, to study how Bahrain could move to a hydrogen economy.

Shaikh Nasser bin Hamad Al Khalifa was appointed chairman of the board of Bapco Energies in April 2021. Managing Director Mohamed bin Mubarak Bin Daina told the press in October 2021 that Shaikh Nasser was leading the agency away from being a purely oil and gas developer and toward becoming an integrated energy corporation.

By 2022, Bapco Energies was studying the possibility of allowing foreign investment in its oil and gas assets, or engaging in an initial public offering. The agency hired a consultant and a financial advisor to assist it with this aspect of Bahrain's national energy strategy.

Bapco Energies raised US$600 million in sukuk in April 2021, and another US$2.2 billion in murabaha (a sharia-compliant bond similar to a cost-plus pricing agreement) in May 2022. About US$1.6 billion was used to refinance older debt. This was the first time Bapco Energies had issued sustainability-linked financing instruments. The murabaha was linked to greenhouse gas emissions and workplace injury reduction targets.

Bapco Energies reported 2020 revenues of BD1.643 billion (about US$4.357 billion), down from BD2.670 billion in 2019. Total assets in 2020 were BD4.055 billion, up from BD3.719 billion in 2019, and total equity was BD1.216 billion, down from BD1.351 billion in 2019.

Bapco Energies rebranded itself from nogaholding to its current name on May 29, 2023.

== Subsidiaries ==
Bapco Energies's subsidiaries include the Bapco Refinery, Bapco Gas, Bahrain Aviation Fueling Company (Bafco), Bahrain Lube Base Oil Company (Blboc), Bapco Upstream, Bahrain LNG, Bahrain Gasoline Blending, BAC Jet Fuel Company, Gulf Petrochemical Industries Company, and Arab Shipbuilding and Repair Yard Bahrain.
