= Gulf Petrochemical Industries Company =

Bahraini petrochemicals company

Coordinates: 26.1436°N 50.6432°E

- Type: Private
- Industry: Petrochemicals
- Founded: December 5, 1979; 46 years ago in Bahrain
- Headquarters: Sitra, Bahrain
- Area served: Worldwide
- Key people: Mohamed bin Mubarak Bin Daina (chairman); Yasser Abdulrahim Alabbasi (chief executive officer)
- Products: Ammonia; Methanol; Urea
- Services: Petrochemical manufacturing Agri-nutrients production Export
- Owner: Bapco Energies (33.3%); Saudi Basic Industries Corporation (33.3%); Petrochemical Industries Company (33.3%)
- Website: gpic.com

Gulf Petrochemical Industries Company (GPIC) is a Bahraini petrochemicals company that manufactures ammonia, methanol, and urea. It operates as a joint venture equally owned by Bapco Energies of Bahrain, Saudi Basic Industries Corporation (SABIC) of Saudi Arabia, and Petrochemical Industries Company of Kuwait. Its principal place of business is in Sitra, Bahrain.

== History ==
GPIC was established on 5 December 1979 as a joint venture between three Gulf Cooperation Council states for the manufacture of fertilizers and petrochemicals. According to the company, it was set up as a Gulf industrial cooperation project, with Bahrain supplying natural gas feedstock for the complex. Its ammonia and methanol plants were commissioned in 1985, while its urea granules plant was commissioned in 1998.

In February 2026, Mohamed bin Mubarak Bin Daina was appointed chairman of GPIC, succeeding Kamal bin Ahmed Mohammed, who had held the post since July 2022.

== Operations ==
GPIC uses natural gas available in Bahrain as feedstock for the production of ammonia, urea, and methanol. Its industrial complex in Sitra was built on a reclaimed area of 60 hectares and includes utility plants, maintenance workshops, offices, stores, and laboratories.

The company exports its products both within the Gulf region and to countries such as the United States, China, India, and Pakistan. GPIC has also developed environmental projects at its site, including a fish farm, bird sanctuary, palm plantations, an herbal garden, and a carbon dioxide recovery plant.
