= Ahmed bin Ateyatalla Al Khalifa =

Ahmed bin Ateyatalla Al Khalifa (Arabic: أحمد بن عطية الله آل خليفة) has a bachelor’s degree in Maths and Computer Science from University of Salford in Manchester, United Kingdom. Following completion of his education, he worked in the Central Informatics Organisation (CIO), Bahrain, for more than 20 years. During his time at the CIO he managed a number of national projects including Government Data Network project, National Y2K project, National Smartcard project, National GIS Project and National Census project. In addition to him being the executive director for the Bahrain national charter, Census 2001 project, municipal council elections and parliament elections projects. He was made president of CIO in 2004.

Al Khalifa was assigned the seat as Minister of Cabinet Affairs in September 2005. His portfolio included the Civil Service Bureau (CSB), Central Informatics Organisation (CIO), the e-Government Authority (EGA), Telecommunications including Telecommunications Regulatory Authority (TRA), Bahrain Internet Exchange (BIX) and the Bahrain Institute of Public administration (BIPA). He was heavily involved in the National Economic Strategy (NES) 2030 and was the leader for the Portfolio Office covering all programs and projects in his domain.

In 2006, he was responsible for the nationwide scandal revealed in Al Bandar report.

In 2011 Al Khalifa was appointed minister for Follow Up in the Royal Court.
