= Frederic Wehrey =

American academic

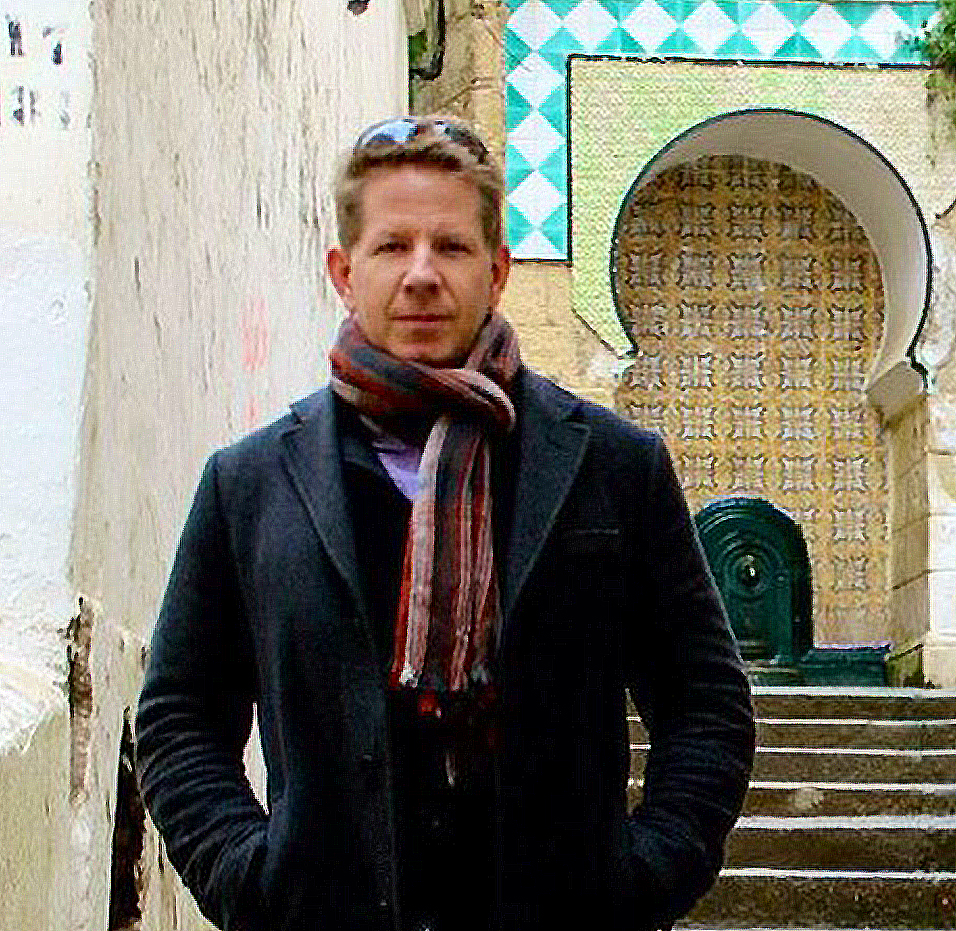

Academic background
- Education: University of Oxford

Academic work
- Discipline: Middle East Affairs
- Sub-discipline: Libyan; Gulf policies

Frederic Wehrey is an American scholar of Middle East affairs, expert on Libyan and Gulf politics, and Senior Fellow at the Middle East Program at the Carnegie Endowment for International Peace. Wehrey earned a PhD in international relations from Oxford University.

Wehrey previously served as a U.S. military officer assigned to the defense attaché office in Tripoli prior to the revolution. He returned to Libya as a researcher after Gaddafi's fall, interviewing Khalifa Haftar and spending time on the frontline with the Libyan National Army. He is the author of the book, Sectarian Politics in the Gulf: From the Iraq War to the Arab Uprisings, which was chosen by Foreign Policy as one of the top five books of 2013 and by Foreign Affairs as one of top three books on the Middle East.

Wehrey has lectured at Princeton, Dartmouth, and Georgetown University. His articles have appeared in The New Yorker, The Washington Post, The New York Times, Foreign Affairs, Foreign Policy and he has appeared on CNN, PBS NewsHour, and The Charlie Rose Show, among others.

Wehrey has testified before the Senate and the House of Representatives on the need for a more effective U.S. policy in Libya.

== Books ==
- Sectarian Politics in the Gulf: From the Iraq War to the Arab Uprisings. Columbia University Press. 2013. ISBN 9780231536103.
- The Burning Shores: Inside the Battle for the New Libya. Farrar, Straus & Giroux. 2018. ISBN 978-0-374-27824-3.
