= Bloody Thursday (Bahrain) =

4th day of the 2011 Bahraini uprising

- Part of the Bahraini uprising of 2011
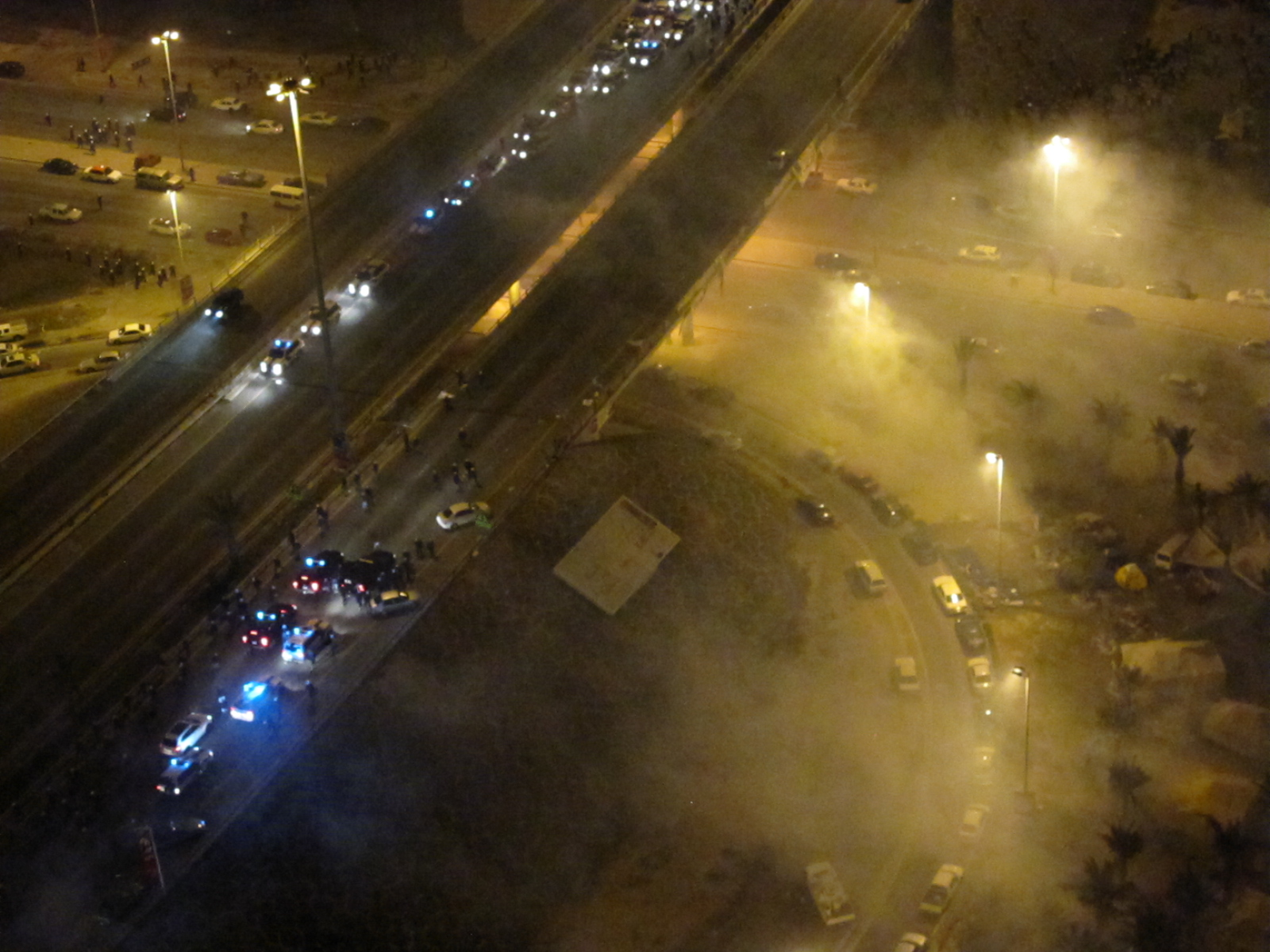
- Riot police firing tear gas from above a flyover while others are moving from below it towards Pearl Roundabout
- Location: 26°13′49″N 50°33′41″E; Pearl Roundabout, Manama, Bahrain
- Date: 17 February 2011; 3:00 am (UTC+3)
- Target: Clear Pearl Roundabout of protesters
- Attack type: Pre-dawn raid
- Weapons: Knives; Clubs; Tear gas; Stun grenades; Birdshot; Guns
- Deaths: 4 protesters
- Injuries: 300+
- Perpetrators: Public Security Forces; National Security Agency (NSA); Bahrain Defence Force (BDF)
- No. of participants: 1,000 Security forces; Non-specified number of plain-clothed officers from the NSA, Criminal Investigations Department and BDF Intelligence

Bloody Thursday (Arabic: خميس البحرين الدامي) is the name given by Bahraini protesters to 17 February 2011, the fourth day of the Bahraini uprising as part of the Arab Spring. Bahraini security forces launched a pre-dawn raid to clear Pearl Roundabout in Manama of the protesters camped there, most of whom were at the time asleep in tents; four were killed and about 300 injured. The event led some to demand even more political reform than they had previously sought, calling for an end to the reign of King Hamad bin Isa Al Khalifa.

The clearance was described by witnesses as being brutal and sudden. Clouds of tear gas covered the area, and volleys of birdshot were fired on those who refused to withdraw. Medics, ambulances and a journalist were reportedly attacked as well. Sporadic clashes broke out around Bahrain hours after the raid. During the afternoon the National Guard and army deployed armoured vehicles, tanks, more than 50 armoured personnel carriers and set up checkpoints in streets across the country. Protesters then took refuge at Salmaniya Medical Complex and continued their agitations; thousands of them chanted "Down with the king, down with the government."

The Bahraini government accused protesters of attacking the security forces, 50 of whom sustained injuries, and insisted that action had been necessary to pull Bahrain back from the "brink of a sectarian abyss". But opposition parties dismissed the government's account as a "silly play", described the raid as a "heinous massacre" and submitted their resignations from the lower house of Parliament.

Internationally, the Gulf Cooperation Council Ministers of Foreign Affairs expressed their solidarity with the government of Bahrain and their support for the measures taken. The United Nations, the European Union and the United States on the other hand expressed their deep concern and regret for the violence used against protesters. The United Kingdom government announced that in light of the unrest it would revoke some arms export licences to Bahrain. A number of international rights groups and independent observers criticised the government crackdown.

== Background ==
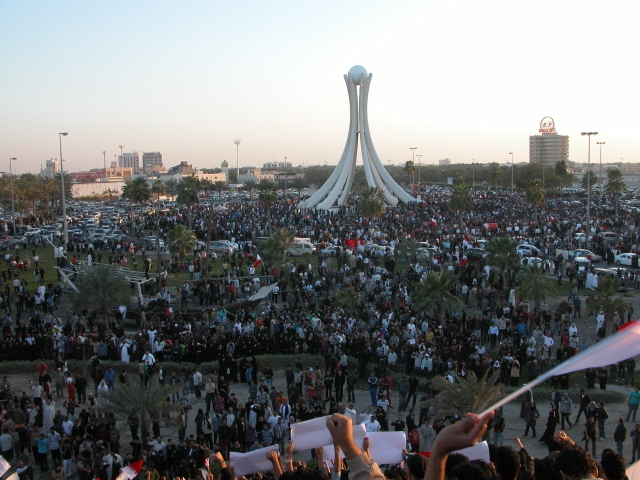
Protesters gathering at Pearl Roundabout for the first time on 15 February.

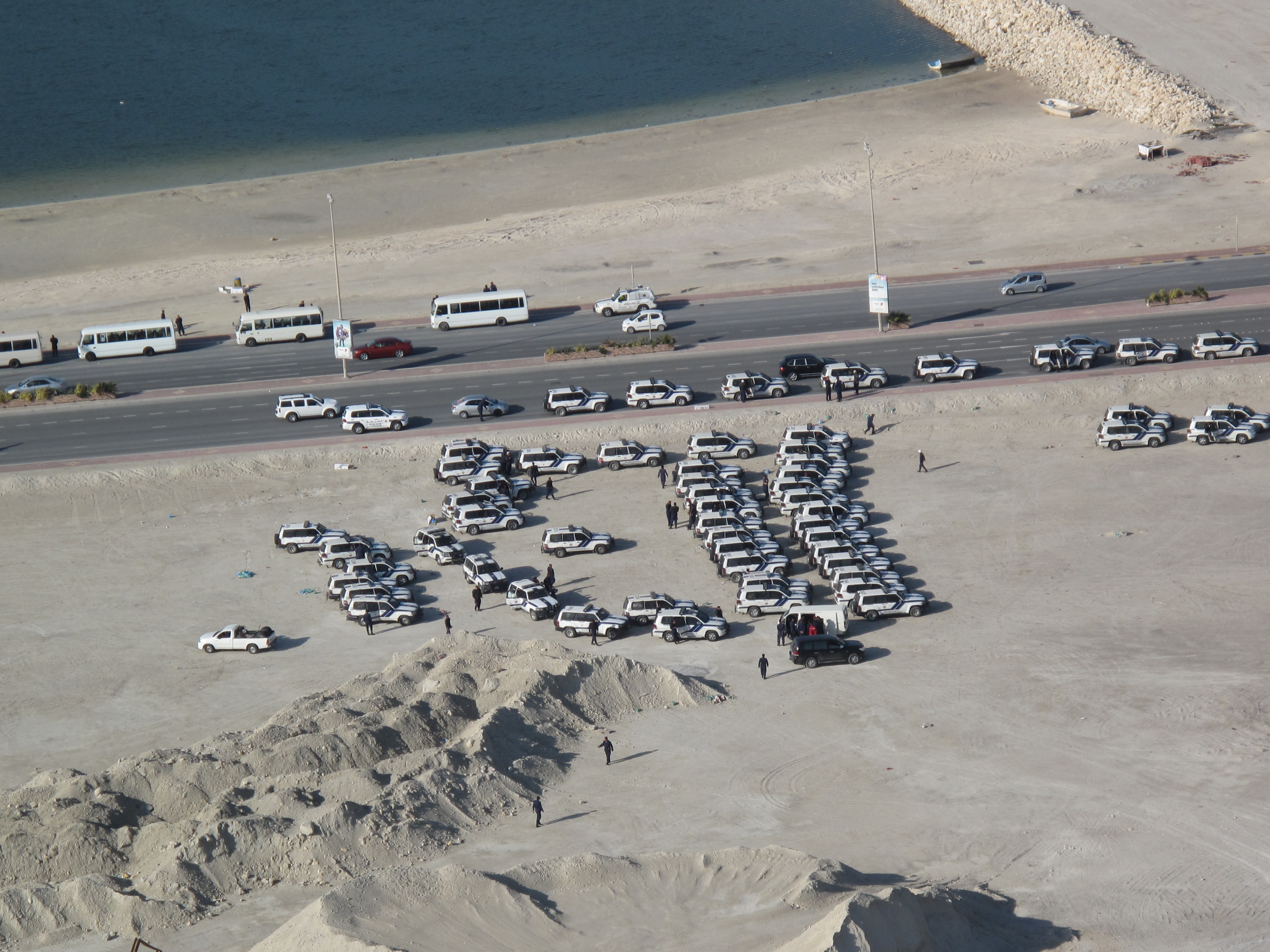
Police retreated from Pearl Roundabout to the northern area close to Bahrain City Centre

The events were part of a string of protests that occurred across the Arab world following the self-immolation and eventual death of Mohammed Bouazizi in Tunisia, the majority Shia population of Bahrain, as well as some Sunni Muslims, took to the streets demanding reforms. Al Jazeera reported that a protest was planned for 14 February, just a few months after the controversial 2010 election.

On 14 February (referred to as Day of Rage by protest organisers), about 6,000 people took part in many protests around Bahrain demanding the release of previously detained protesters, socio-economic justice, political reform and a constitutional monarchy. Police then attacked the protesters throughout the day, using tear gas, rubber bullets and shotguns, inflicting many injuries and causing the hospitalisation of four demonstrators. In the evening, Ali Mushaima died from police shotgun wounds to his back at close range. The next day, thousands of mourners attended his funeral. During the ceremony police shot Fadhel Al-Matrook in the back at close range; he died from his wounds within an hour. People were then allowed to march to and occupy Pearl Roundabout, where they began to set up tents; the number of demonstrators had swelled to 10,000 people by nightfall. King Hamad offered his condolences for the two deaths and announced the establishment of a committee to investigate the events of the previous two days. In total, 25 people were said to have been injured on 15 February.

By 16 February, Pearl Roundabout was still occupied by thousands of protesters. Some of those present at the scene described the mood at the roundabout as "festive," with protesters distributing tea, coffee and food while discussing the situation in the country. Opposition political figures such as Ali Salman and Abdulwahab Hussain also addressed the crowds gathered at the roundabout. Elsewhere in the country a funeral procession was held for Fadhel Al-Matrook, while a motorcade of about 100 cars with supporters of King Hamad passed without police interference.

The Ministry of Interior then announced that the gathering at Pearl Roundabout was illegal and that it was only tolerated as a display of sympathy in the wake of recent events. King Hamad visited the Bahrain Defence Force headquarters, where he met its Commander-in-Chief Field Marshal Khalifa bin Ahmad and other senior military officers. Together they reviewed "the preparations undertaken by the Defence Force to protect the security of the homeland and to maintain the safety of citizens."

=== Naming ===
In Bahrain, especially among the organising activists, the day police stormed the roundabout was posthumously referred to as Bahrain Bloody Thursday; some doctors also referred to it as Black Thursday; while other opposition members have called it a massacre.

== Raid ==
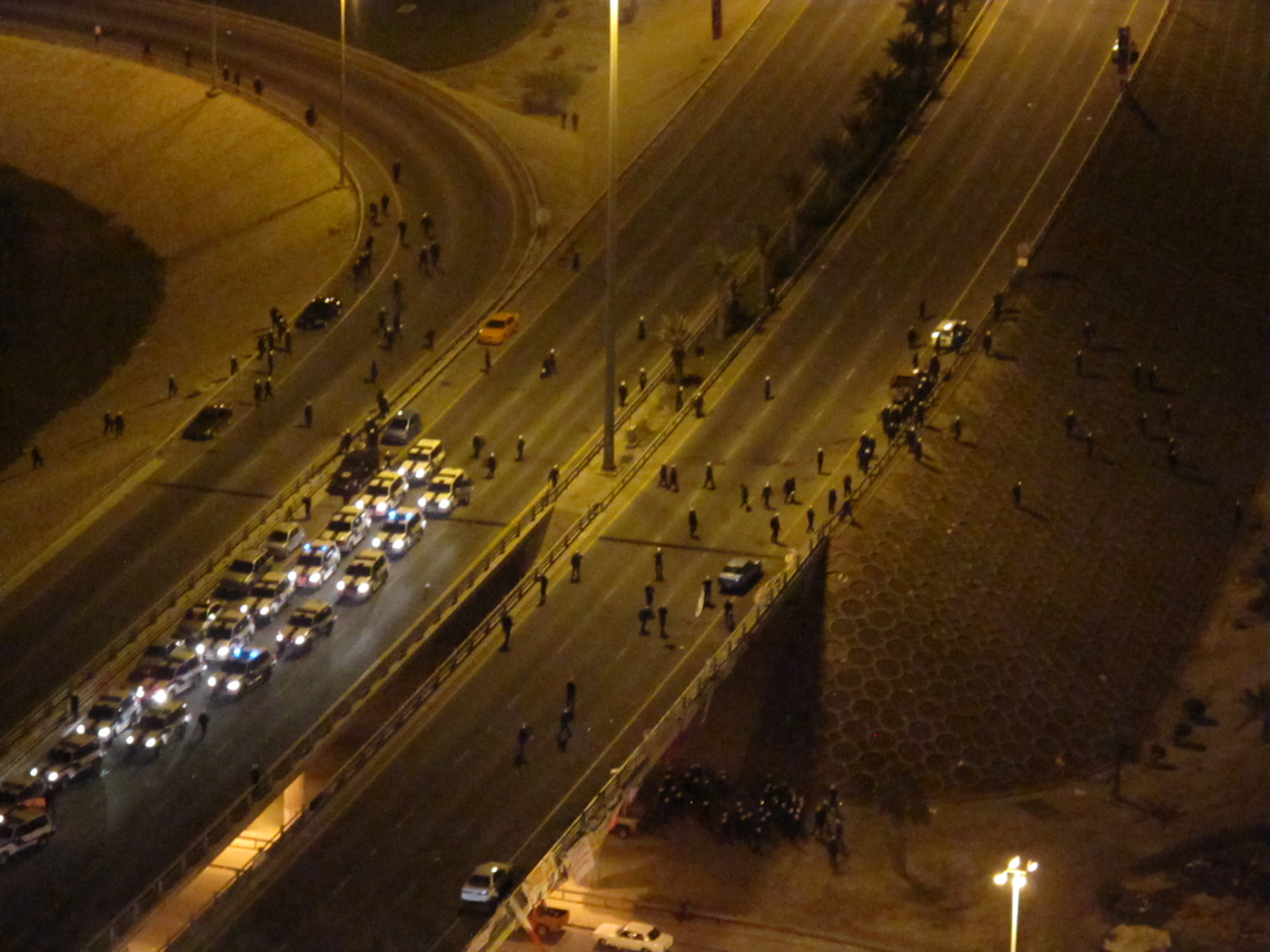
Three out of four police units deployed in Manama entered Pearl Roundabout from several points and pushed protesters away from it

In a pre-dawn raid, at about 3:00 on 17 February, around 1,000 police were dispatched to clear the Pearl Roundabout of an estimated 1,500–3,000 individuals staying overnight in tents. According to the Bahrain Independent Commission of Inquiry, police were armed with sticks, shields, sound bombs, tear gas and shotguns. They moved on protesters from two directions, the flyover north of Pearl Roundabout and Noaim, south of the roundabout. In addition, personnel from NSA and BDF were onsite.

=== Eyewitness and journalist accounts ===
According to eyewitnesses, the raid was sudden and without warning and many sleeping protesters, including women and children, were awoken by the sounds of tear gas and stun grenades. Armed plainclothes policemen arrived in more than 100 civilian cars and started breaking into tents before the uniformed officers started shooting. The police carried knives, which they used to slice through tents, before beating women and men inside and firing on some people with bird-shot shotguns. Clouds of tear gas covered Pearl Roundabout that "one could not see surroundings," according to one witness.

Maryam Alkhawaja of the Bahrain Centre for Human Rights said: "The attack was very violent, [the police] were not showing any mercy." An unnamed injured protester told the local independent newspaper Al-Wasat he was within a group of protesters who were awake and that they chanted "peaceful ... peaceful" before being attacked by police who reportedly stole his wallet, camera and mobile phone after beating and dragging him with a rope. Another injured protester described how women and children were running all over the place; even after withdrawing to nearby villages, police still pursued protesters and arrested "large numbers" of them. Other eyewitnesses said police searched the cars parked around Pearl Roundabout, damaging some of them.

People were attacked while they were sleeping. There was no warning. And when they ran, the police attacked them from the direction they fled to.

— Nazeha Saeed, Radio Monte Carlo

Yet another injured protesters said: "They had encircled us and they kept shooting tear gas and live rounds. The circle got closer and closer." Some witnesses claimed the police used anti-Shia curses during their attacks on the mainly Shia protesters. Medics who arrived at Pearl Roundabout said they saw police stamping on handcuffed protesters who laid on the ground. A nurse said she saw a group of police "execute" a young protester with a gun at "point-blank range" after handcuffing and beating him.

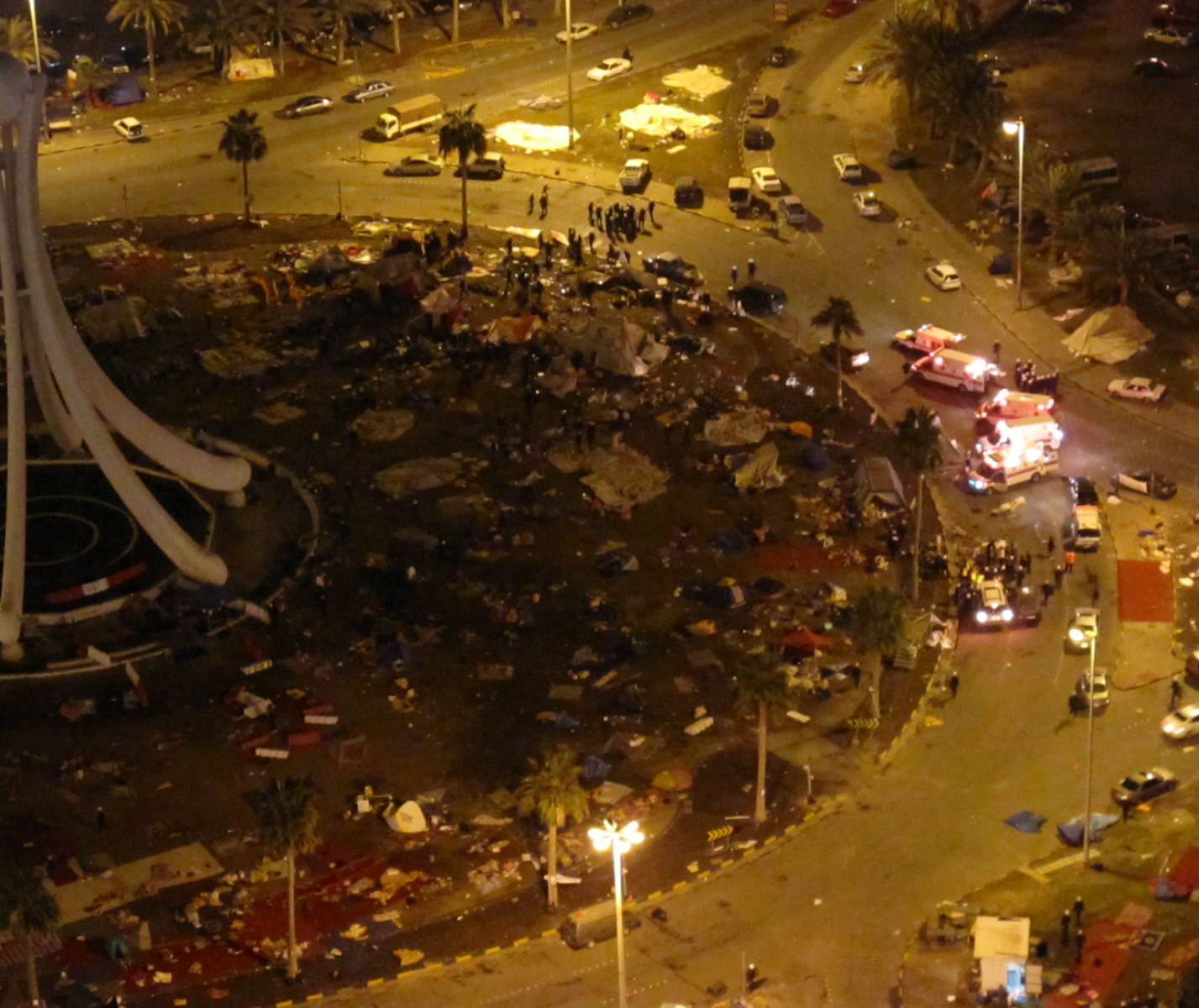
Five ambulances arrived at Pearl Roundabout

ABC News reporter Miguel Marquez said he was beaten by men carrying clubs while he was making a phone call report. "There was a canister that looked like – No! No! No! Hey! I'm a journalist here! I'm going! I'm going! I'm going! I'm going! ... I'm hit." Then, in an attempt to show he was not a protester, Marquez yelled "Journalist, journalist!," yet he reported getting hit multiple times and that his camera was stolen. He described the plainclothes police who reportedly attacked him as a "gang of thugs," who wanted to clear the square before planned protests following Friday prayers.

=== Health worker accounts ===
A medical volunteer said that despite showing their identification cards police attacked ten medics at the roundabout who had offered their services.

For eight hours Health Minister Faisal al-Hamar prevented ambulances going to the assistance of those injured at Pearl Roundabout. Doctors and paramedics protested inside Salmaniya Medical Complex (SMC); while still doing their best to help the wounded, medics signed a petition and formed a human chain calling for his resignation for "blocking ambulances from going to help those injured in Pearl Roundabout." They claimed that he told doctors at the hospital of his resignation before leaving. However, he later rejected that claim.

I've seen tens of casualties including children getting beaten by security forces. Bodies were lying on the floor and security forces prevented us from getting to them. They [police] were kicking the bodies and treating them harshly, bluntly and without any humanity.

— Mohammed Ramadan, a paramedic

Despite the block, Salmaniya Medical Complex's disaster plan was activated on the morning of the attack. It called for more than a dozen ambulances to search nearby areas and Pearl Roundabout. Another dozen ambulances were put on stand-by, according to a member of the medical staff. The staff said that ambulances were functioning in accordance with the plan until about 6:00 am, when an alleged call from the Ministry of Interior ordered all but two ambulances to head back to the SMC. However, this order was ignored and more ambulances were sent to search for the injured in the areas surrounding the roundabout.

About five ambulances reached Pearl Roundabout, where they were confronted by police and army forces; three drivers and nine paramedics were attacked. One of the injured drivers claimed that police had clubbed him and that a senior officer had told him: "If I see you again, I'll kill you." Another ambulance driver, who was unharmed, said that police removed injured protesters from his vehicle by force and a military officer – whom he believed to be a Saudi, based on his Arabic dialect – held a gun to his head and warned him to drive away or be shot. One ambulance was reportedly confiscated by police, who then took it to an unknown location after beating its driver and other paramedics, who had to walk back to the SMC.

A paramedic also said police allowed the first ambulances that reached Pearl Roundabout to pass safely, while some security personnel captured videos, but when the ambulances moved out carrying casualties security forces had targeted the vehicles. He said: "Later Bahrain T.V. showed only the scenes where they allowed us to pass in order to mislead the public opinion. I personally heard orders given to security forces via their communication devices to target, threat and delay paramedics as long as they can. Security forces dealt with us as if we were defendants and partners to protesters who wanted to hide them, whereas what we were doing was a professional and humane duty that has nothing to do with our political position." When the block was lifted in the late morning till noon, paramedics did not find any casualties to take back to the SMC at Pearl Roundabout, despite seeing handcuffed protesters being stomped on by police when they arrived.

=== Government accounts ===
External videos
- Ministry of Interior spokesman Tariq Al-Hassan on Bahrain TV on YouTube

The government account of the incident indicated that police, using a megaphone, had ordered protesters to evacuate the area and that some had done so, whereas others remained in defiance of the law. It added that police only intervened after exhausting all opportunities for dialogue and that lethal shots were fired only at armed protesters who attacked police officers. Security forces reported finding pistols, bullets, large quantities of knives, daggers, swords and other sharp objects, as well as Hezbollah flags at the site.

On a state television show, Ministry of Interior spokesman Tariq Al-Hassan said that fifty police officers had been injured, including two with serious sword wounds and that "one protester drove over police resulting in injuries including cutting-off fingers of a policeman before we could catch him." He also denied policemen prevented ambulances from reaching Pearl Roundabout or attacked any paramedics, but instead: "What happened is that protesters stole an ambulance car, so we were checking on every ambulance that reaches the roundabout." One doctor working at SMC's ER supported the government's account, accusing protesters of attacking the Under-Secretary-of-State for Health, taking control of all hospital entrances and stealing an ambulance.

The Bahrain Independent Commission of Inquiry, set up by the king to report on the events of February and March, did not see any evidence to support the government's claim that protesters were armed or that medics had supplied them with weapons, however it stated that medics took control of the first floor of Salmaniya hospital. Eyewitnesses also denied being warned by the police, saying that if they had known of the police presence then women and children would have been evacuated.

== Aftermath ==
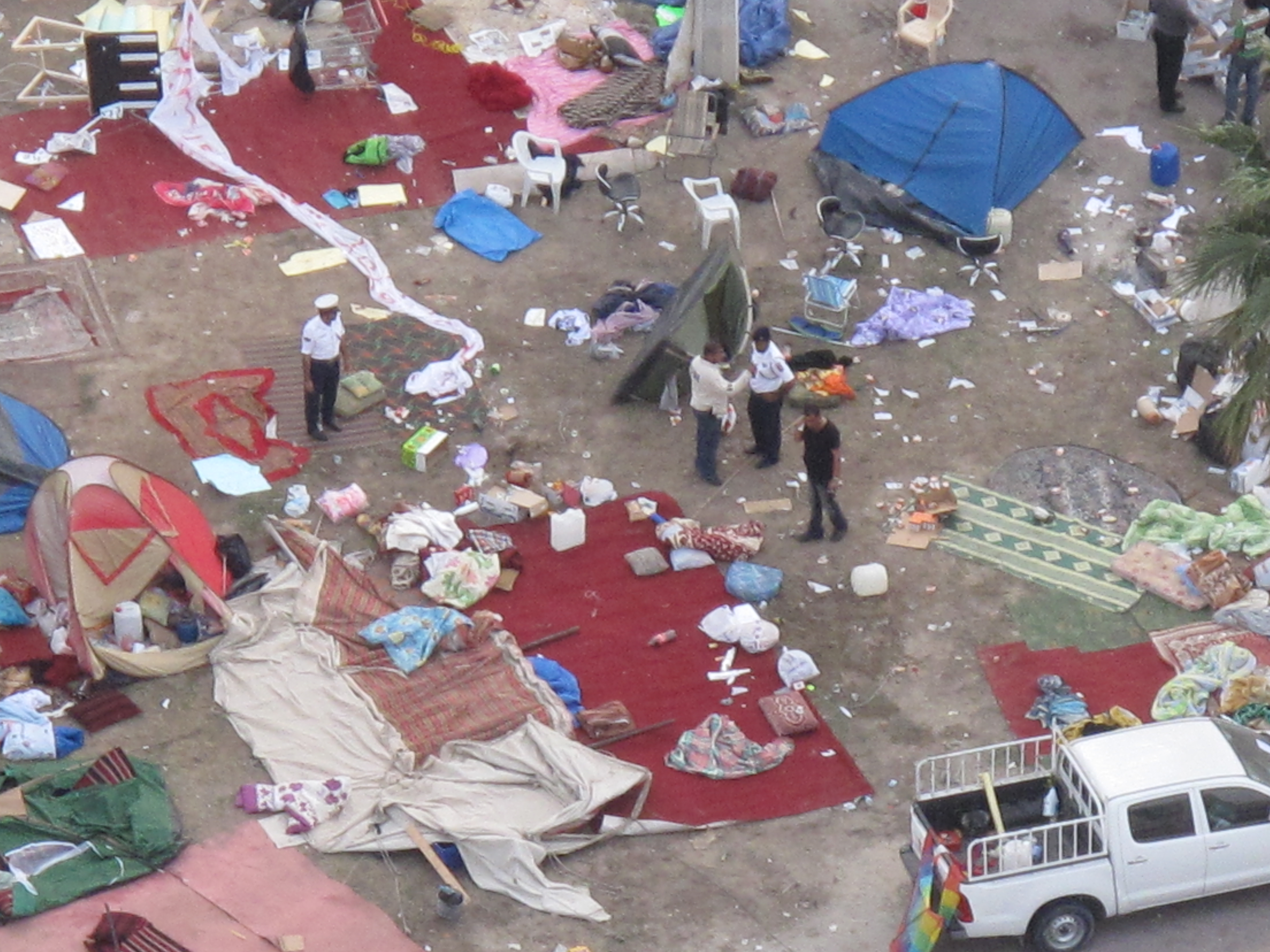
Pearl Roundabout in the morning of the raid

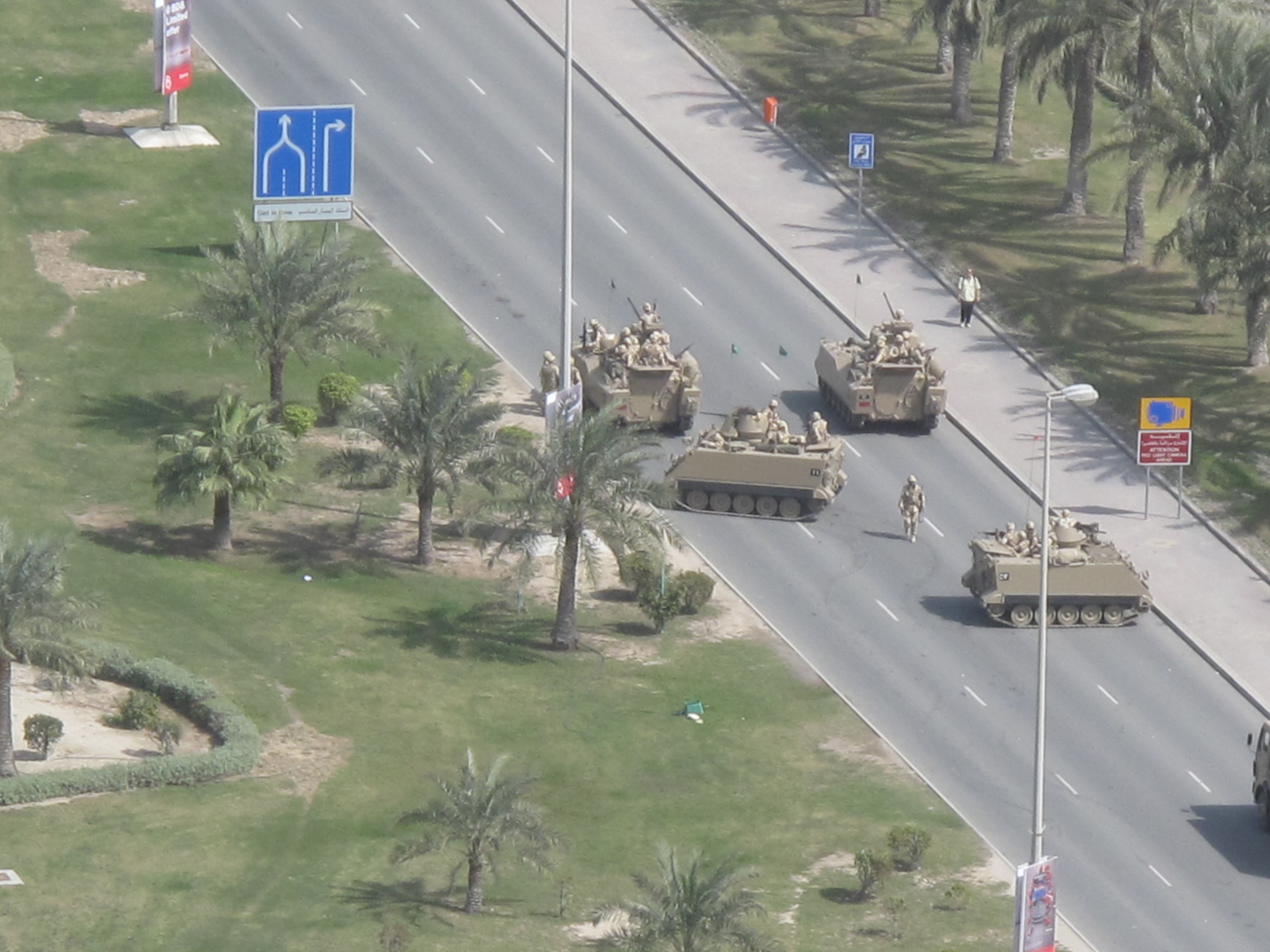
Army checkpoint near Pearl Roundabout

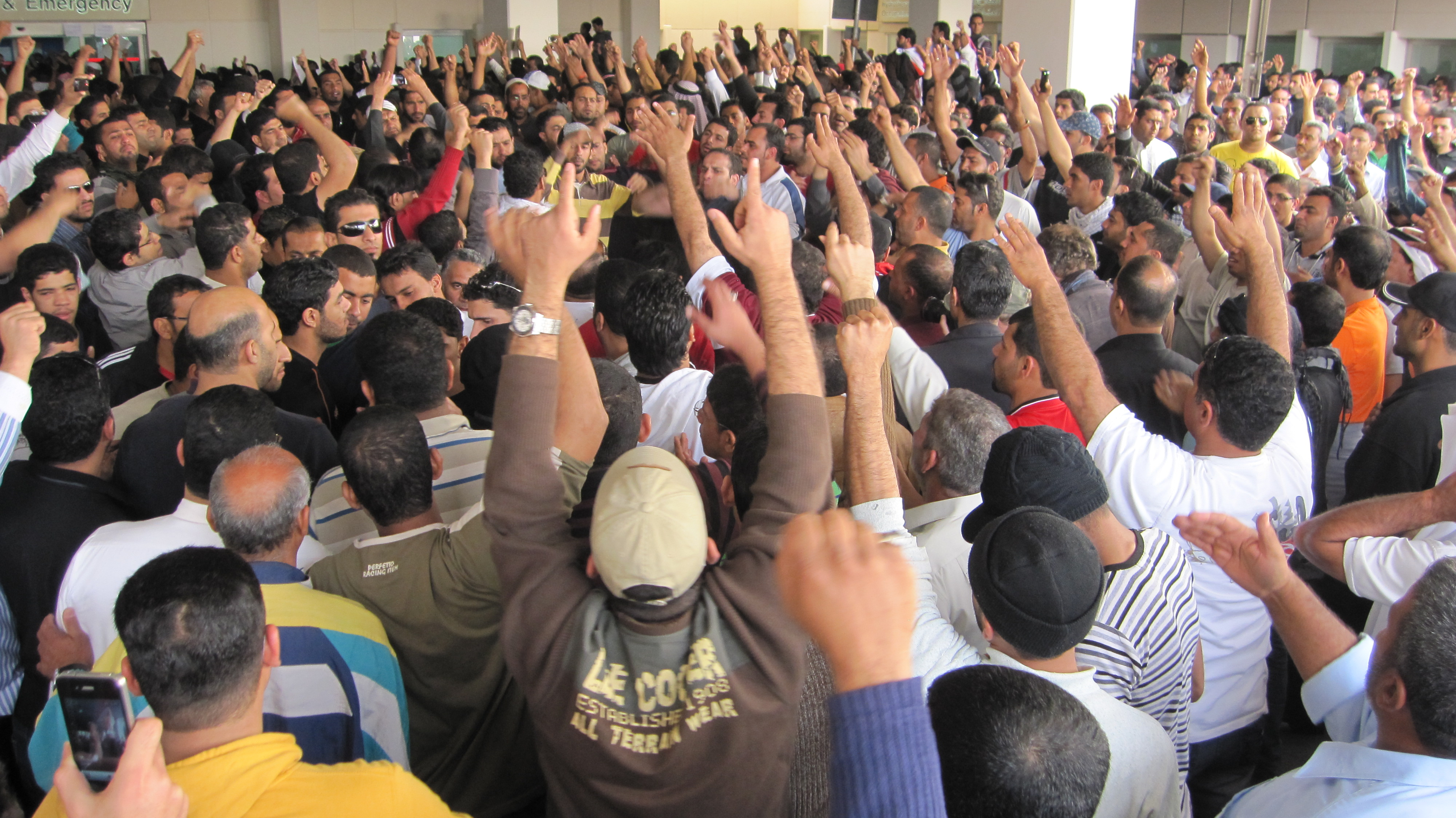
Protesters gathering at Salmaniya hospital car parks

The raid culminated in the destruction of the encampment, with flattened tents and protesters' belongings scattered all over the place. Security forces then declared the protest camp to be illegal and installed barbed wire around Pearl Roundabout. An hour after the attack, a number of protesters tried to return to the roundabout, which was completely controlled by police. Security forces fired a shotgun on one protester directly in the head from a few centimetres away, killing him instantly. Police claimed the protesters attacked them using "metal rods, swords, molotov cocktails, stones, and other weapons." After some more time around 500 protesters gathered in the Noaim area, but were dispersed by police.

Sporadic clashes broke out around Bahrain hours after the raid. During the afternoon, the National Guard deployed eight armoured vehicles and the Bahrain Defence Force deployed tanks and at least 50 armoured personnel carriers armed with machine guns around the capital, Manama, the first time military armoured vehicles had been seen in the streets since the protests commenced. Military checkpoints were set up and patrols circulated throughout the country. The Interior Ministry issued a warning to citizens to stay out of the streets; while the army warned people that they were ready to take "punitive measures" to restore order. The Bahrain Defence Force issued Statement 1, which asked citizens to "distance themselves from gatherings in vital areas in the capital [to prevent] fear, shock and serious traffic disruptions." Main roads leading to Manama were blocked and traffic was also redirected, while main roads of the capital were almost empty, as workers stayed home, leaving banks and "other key institutions" closed.

=== Salmaniya hospital ===
According to an unnamed Al Jazeera reporter, hospitals in Manama were full because of patients that were awaiting treatment as a result of and during the police raid, including medical personnel who were attacked by police while trying to help the wounded. The New York Times columnist Nicholas Kristof reported that "hospital corridors were also full of frantic mothers searching desperately for children who had gone missing in the attack." Women's cries were evident in the hospital and some fainted. The Minister of Health appeared on state television and claimed that the situation at the main hospital was calm and that there were only seven minor injuries.

The blood bank at SMC called for blood donations, while the U.S. missionary hospital announced that it will be treating those injured for free. An eyewitness at the hospital said: "Lots of people are standing at the gates of the hospital. The police have closed the area so that no people can get in or out – some tried to get out and were shot at by police." The SMC was seen as a safe place for the opposition protesters to go. By late afternoon, about 4,000 protesters had congregated at the hospital, while protesters who had gathered in the car parks near the emergency entrance chanted: "Down with the regime, with our blood we will defend our rights."

After seeing the violence, Ali al-Ghanmi, a police officer, left his guard post and joined the crowd, announcing to them that he could no longer support "a killer institution." The crowd hoisted him on their shoulders and al-Ghanmi became an immediate "mini-celebrity" of the protest movement.

== Casualties ==
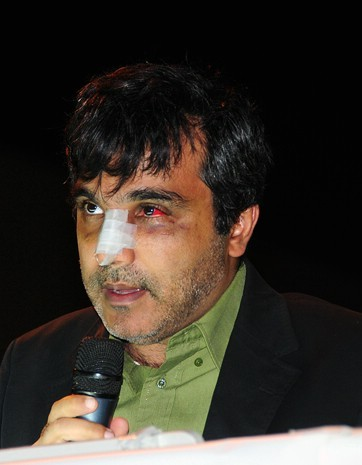
Plastic surgeon Sadiq Alekry giving a speech, two weeks after his injury

More than 300 individuals were injured during the raid, including women and children; some of them in critical condition. Injured protesters were taken to the Salmaniya Medical Complex, many of them with broken limbs and open wounds. Four individuals were killed by police using shotguns, from close range. While two of them who were shot in the back, another protester was shot in the thigh and subsequently died at the SMC; the fourth was shot in the head later and died instantly. At least 25,000 mourners took part at the funeral procession, which was held in Sitra on 18 February for the three protesters originating from the island.

Dr Sadiq Alekry

Dr Sadiq Alekry, a 44-year-old plastic surgeon, voluntarily offered his services at the roundabout on the evening of 16 February, shortly after he had returned from Houston. According to Human rights watch, Alekry along with other staff were wearing special medical jackets showing the Red Crescent. During the raid, riot police attacked his tent and cut through it; despite telling them he was a physician, police handcuffed him from his back and a number of security officers repeatedly punched, kicked and hit him with sticks on his head and other parts of the body.

About 20 officers then marched him away from Pearl Roundabout. Alekry said that while walking him, riot police also broke his nose and damaged his left eye so badly in the process that he temporarily lost his sight. He was then taken to a police bus, where his pants were pulled down by an officer who threatened Alekry with sexual assault; though the threat was not carried out.

In the bus, Alekry's shirt was pulled over his head and, while he was still hand-cuffed, security officers continued kicking and beating him for about an hour, until he fell to the floor. Nevertheless, the beating continued and Alekry reported that a police officer told him: "If you bleed in my chair with your dirty blood I will beat you to death!" When an ambulance arrived, police allowed him and three other detainees to be taken to hospital. He arrived at the SMC at 6:00 am, with severe injuries to his back, chest and face and underwent facial surgery a few days later.

=== Deaths ===
Ali Ahmed Moumen

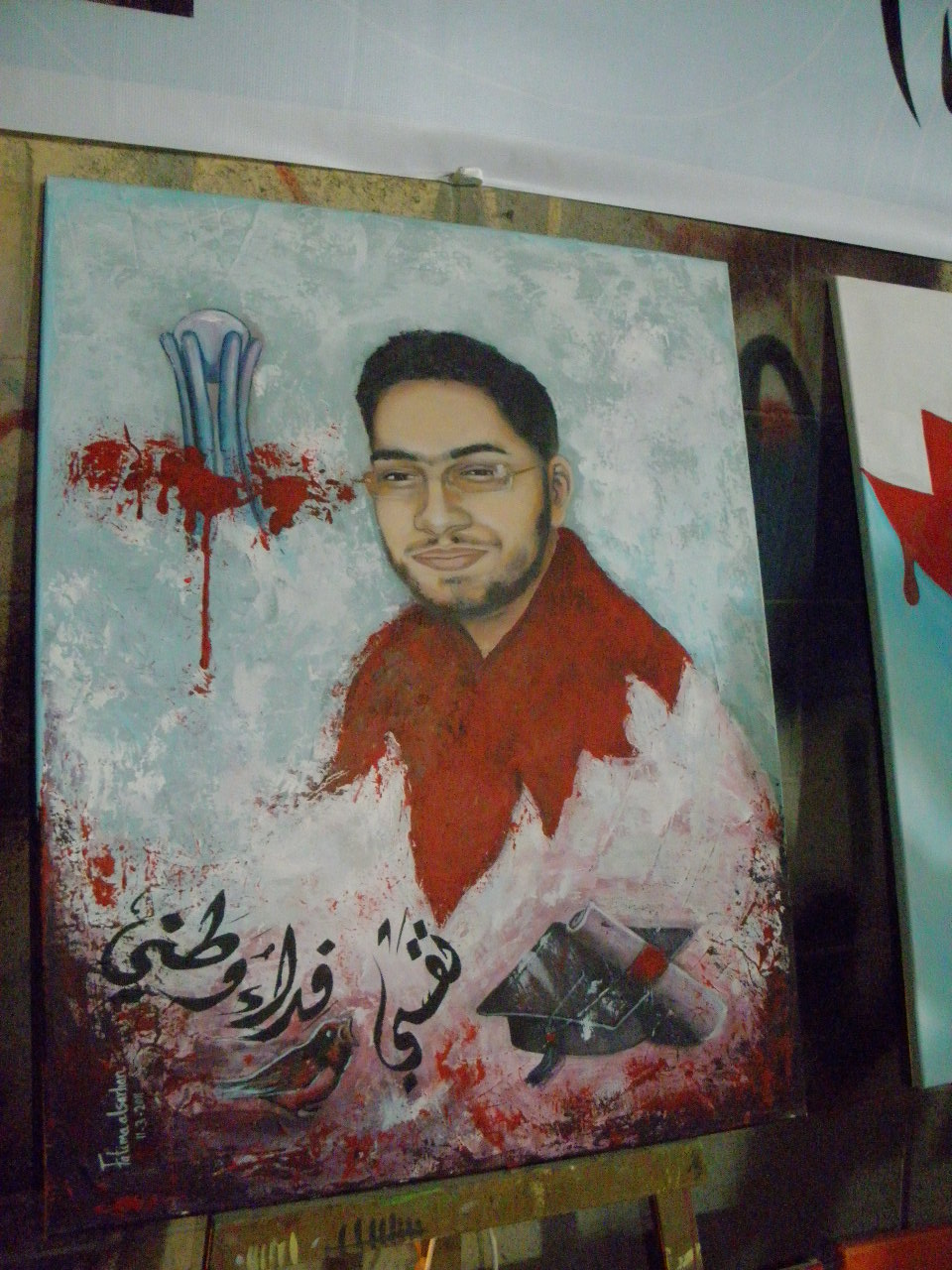
Portrait in memorial of Ali Moumen

Ali Ahmed Moumen was a 22-year-old college senior who died at the SMC on 17 February after being shot by the police in the thigh. His death certificate indicated he died due to "extensive bleeding leading to intractable hypovolemic shock." Hours before his death he had posted a "status" update on Facebook saying: "My blood is sacrificed for my country." That night, Moumen was sleeping beside his younger brother and made it out of Pearl Roundabout safely, but, according to his father, was then killed when he tried to return after hearing women and children were trapped. One of his friends said Ali was "shot in the street and merely left to die."

Moumen was picked up at around 8:30 from Pearl Roundabout. He had serious injuries to his pelvis and right thigh. Bleeding profusely, two paramedics found Moumen after police allowed them through. The paramedics reported that they saw another possibly dead body with a fractured skull close to Moumen's, but were not permitted to pick it up. While leaving, the ambulance was reportedly attacked by riot police who beat the driver before allowing them to continue to the SMC. At the emergency room, Moumen had a surgery, but he died at 9:30. His father called Prime Minister Khalifa bin Salman Al Khalifa a "killer" and blamed him for his son's death. An unnamed policeman charged with the murder of Moumen was acquitted on 27 September 2012.

Ali Mansoor Khudair

Ali Mansour Ahmed Khudair was a 53 or 58-year-old Bahraini who died on 17 February after police shot at his back. He had 91 pellets in his chest. Khudair was a fisherman from Sitra who lived in a ramshackle house. He had three sons: Hassan (21), Jaffar (14) and Ahmed (9), as well as an 18-year-old daughter. Jaffar said: "I was with my father in Pearl Roundabout when they attacked. We were asleep at first, when I woke up, I started moving away, but my father told me to endure, stay and not fear. Then we heard screams and rushed there. For a few seconds he spoke to the security forces, asking them to stay away from women and children, but they shot him in the chest. He fell to the ground and I couldn't see him after tear gas cloud covered the place."

Mahmood Makki Abutaki

Mahmoud Makki Abutaki was a 22-year-old college student majoring in engineering, when he died on 17 February after being shot in the back by police. Medics pulled about 200 pellets of birdshot from his chest and arms. Abutaki's elder brother, Ahmed, who was in the morgue while holding his brothers' hands, recalled the last conversation they had the previous night for the media present: "He said, 'This is my chance, to have a say, so that maybe our country will do something for us.' My country did do something; it killed him."

Isa Abdulhasan Ali Hussain

Isa Abdulhasan Ali Hussain was a 60-year-old Bahraini who died on 17 February morning immediately after riot police fired at his head from point-blank range. Hussain was a part of a group of protesters who marched back towards Pearl Roundabout after being dispersed when police shot him. Eyewitnesses say he went near security forces asking them to allow young people help the injured protesters. However, police claimed he was with a group of protesters who attacked them using metal rods, swords, molotov cocktails, stones and other weapons. His funeral was held on 18 February in Karzakan and was attended by thousands of mourners. An unnamed policeman charged with his murder was acquitted on 27 September 2012.

== Responses ==
=== Domestic ===
Executive

King Hamad bin Isa Al Khalifa praised the concluding statement from the meeting of the Cooperation Council for the Arab States of the Gulf foreign ministers, which was held on 17 February in Manama, and offered "full support" for Bahrain's security and politically, economically and defensively. At a news conference, Foreign Minister Khalid ibn Ahmad Al Khalifah alleged, and expressed his surprise, that protesters had attacked police. When asked about the reasons for choosing a pre-dawn time for the raid, he said: "The reason for choosing this time was the smaller number of participants, and this reduces injuries." He called the deaths of the three protestors during the raid a "regrettable accident. Police action was necessary to pull Bahrain back from the brink of a sectarian abyss." During the press conference, which was broadcasting live on national television, Al-Wasat correspondent Reem Khalifa cried tears and described what happened as a "real massacre."

In what Al-Wasat called "an unexpected move," Crown Prince Salman bin Hamad bin Isa Al Khalifa appeared on state-owned television to express his condolences to the people for the "hard days" and asked them to "calm down." He offered open dialogue with political societies, shortly before a royal decree was issued by his father, King Hamad, commissioning Salman to lead the dialogue.

Legislative

If the government had any evidence to prove protesters attacked security forces with white arms, they'd have shown it already.

— Abdul Jalil Khalil, Al Wefaq

All 18 MPs from Al Wefaq, the only opposition political party represented in parliament, submitted their resignations. They announced that the investigation committee formed by the king to fact-find the issues into the previous two killing incidents was only for media consumption, more so in the light of the deaths of four more protesters. They said the extraordinary session of parliament was illegal according to its rules of procedure. Al Wefaq described the government account as a "silly play that wasn't even as good as the previously exposed plays." It considered the report, which published photographs of firearms, swords and daggers, as "funny" and that these tools were not commercially sold in Bahrain.

Ali Salman, the head of Al Wefaq, said the party would continue to demand reform. Abdul Jalil Khalil, an Al Wefaq member of parliament, described the raid as "real terrorism. Whoever took the decision to attack the protest was aiming to kill." He also said the casualty number is proportionally large given the small size of Bahrain's population and added: "After what happened today, people are asking us to leave parliament. Quit the government." Other Al Wefaq MP's and lawyers made a criminal complaint against senior officials of the Ministry of Interior, including its minister, the agents, the commander of public security forces, his assistants and the various heads of security zones.

Political

Talking about Hezbollah flags is only for the sake of public opinion so that they can call this movement sectarian and pro-Iranian.

— Ibrahim Sharif, Sunni opposition figure

Seven opposition political parties, including Al Wefaq and the National Democratic Action Society, issued a joint statement rejecting the government's charge that the demonstrators were armed and condemning "the heinous massacre" perpetrated by police, including the prevention of ambulances from reaching the site to ferry the wounded to hospital. They demanded the resignation of the government and the formation of a new one to investigate the "crime" and submit political reforms. Ibrahim Sharif, the head of National Democratic Action Society and a Sunni Muslim, said protesters were not given enough time to evacuate the area and that government could have told them hours before or even by small papers thrown from helicopters. He told the BBC that "throughout the day there were rumours we would have another 24 hours, but the attack has come without [any] warning."

Other

The General Federation of Workers Trade Unions in Bahrain condemned the use of force in breaking up the peaceful gathering at Pearl Roundabout and asked King Hamad to intervene to stop security forces' violence and to punish those responsible for the incidents. They also announced that a meeting of the Central Council and heads of other trade unions is in the state of permanent session to take any deemed necessary steps, including the call for a general strike. The Bahrain Teachers' Society called for a strike and gatherings outside schools on 20 February. The Bahrain Human Rights Society and 18 other civil society foundations condemned the "sudden brutal attack" and asked other international and Arab figures to condemn it.

Ayatollah Isa Qassim, Bahrain's highest-ranking Shia cleric, described the incident as a "massacre" in Friday sermon's Khutbah: "This reckless murder, and thirst to kill would create a complete break between the government and the people, and it will not allow any chance of any vote aiming to calm the situation and heal the wounds." A group of clerics including the head of the Olama council visited the wounded at the SMC and spoke of their support for the protesters' demands and also called for immediate political reforms. The Olama council described the raid as a "terrible crime and at least a massacre" and asked for immediate urgent initiatives to achieve the "just demands of the people. We refuse blank prosthetic solutions, the practice of wasting time, and referral to the powerless Parliament that lacks popular legitimacy."

Doctors, nurses and paramedics organised a sit-in at the parks of the SMC demanding the resignation of the health minister and condemning the blocking of ambulances from going to Pearl Roundabout. The Bahrain Medical Society and Bahrain Dental Society issued a joint statement denouncing the "unjustified and excessive use of force by police, and the banning of medical teams from performing their duties" and asked the king to take immediate action to stop these procedures from re-occurring.

=== International ===
Supranational bodies

The United Nations Secretary-General Ban Ki-moon asked for bringing to justice those responsible for the violence. He expressed his deep concern and disturbance "by the violent means used to disperse demonstrators." A spokesperson for Catherine Ashton, the European Union's High Representative, said that she was very concerned about the events that took place and that she expressed regret for the deaths and acts of violence, while also calling on the Bahraini government to respect and protect the basic rights of its citizens including the right to assemble peacefully. "Concerns expressed by the people must be addressed peacefully through dialogue."

States

In light of events we are today formally reviewing recent licensing decisions for exports to Bahrain. We will urgently revoke licences if we judge that they are no longer in line with the criteria.

— Alistair Burt, a British minister

French Foreign Ministry spokeswoman Christine Valle expressed regret for the excessive use of force in several Arab countries and serious concern about the recent developments in Bahrain, as well as Libya and Yemen, in particular. German Foreign Minister Guido Westerwelle condemned the use of violence by the police and called on officials in Bahrain to stop the use of violence immediately and protect the protesters better. "They [protestors] are just exercising their rights." Saudi Arabian prince Talal Bin Abdulaziz, father of prince Al Waleed Bin Talal, said there is a chance protests in Bahrain would move into Saudi Arabia if serious reforms were not carried out. United Arab Emirates Foreign Minister Abdullah bin Zayed Al Nahyan expressed his country's support for Bahrain, stressing that what affects Bahrain and its security would affect the entire Gulf Cooperation Council and ultimately all countries of the world.

We call on restraint from the government, to keep its commitment to hold accountable those who have utilized excessive force against peaceful demonstrators, and we urge a return to a process that will result in real, meaningful changes for the people there.

— Hillary Clinton, U.S. Secretary of State

United Kingdom Foreign Secretary William Hague said that he was "deeply concerned" by the "unacceptable violence" used against protesters. He also stressed the "need for peaceful action to address the concerns of protesters" to his Bahraini counterpart. The U.K. government then announced that in light of the unrest it has decided to revoke some arms export licenses to Bahrain stating that "licenses will not be issued when officials judge that there is a risk that the exports may provoke regional or internal conflicts or be used to facilitate internal repression." However, arms sales continued throughout the year. The British Foreign Office also temporarily closed its embassy in Bahrain.

United States President Barack Obama expressed his objection the use of the violence by the Bahraini government against peaceful demonstrators. White House spokesman Jay Carney said that it was "not an appropriate reaction" to use force against the protesters. Secretary of State Hillary Clinton called Bahrain's foreign minister during the day to convey "our deep concern about the actions of the security forces." The Pentagon's spokesman said that they were keeping a close look at developments in Bahrain and called on all parties to "exercise restraint and refrain from violence." Jennifer Stride, the Bahrain-based U.S. Fifth Fleet's spokeswoman, said there was no "indication the protests will cause significant disruption" for the fleet, which she also said was "not being targeted."

Other

Bernie Ecclestone, the F1 commercial rights holder, said if the unrest has "not quietened down by Wednesday, I think we will have to cancel the 2011 Bahrain Grand Prix probably." On 21 February the race was postponed and then canceled later. Human Rights Watch called on the Bahraini government to stop attacking peaceful protesters and start probes into the deaths. Amnesty International similarly condemned the government crackdown and asked for an independent investigation into the events. Anonymous, an online hackers grouping, issued a statement condemning the crackdown and expressed its solidarity with the protesters: "By interfering with the freedom to hold peaceful protests, the Bahrainian [sic] government has made itself a clear enemy of its own citizens and of Anonymous. The actions of this regime will not be forgotten, nor will they be forgiven."

When a king opens fire on his people, he no longer deserves to be ruler. That might be the only way to purge this land of ineffable heartbreak.

— Nicolas Kristof, New York Times columnist

The New York Times columnist Nicolas Kristof described the raid as "brutal repression" that is usually "confined to remote and backward nations" and referred to the government's version of events as "preposterous" and expressed his sadness over the events. Fareed Zakaria, CNN's international affairs analyst, said that the crackdown on the protesters was a "rash move that will enrage many of its people and cost the regime international prestige. This is a terrible mistake and they will pay a heavy price for it. The regime in Bahrain is doing something very rash and unwise; it is trying to respond by using force and punitive measures. This is not going to work in the end."

== Analysis ==
The events at the Pearl Roundabout and Salmaniya Medical Complex marked a turning point in the Bahraini uprising, according to the media; an analysis by The Guardian said it reduced, if not killed, any chance of dialogue. The raid expanded the demands of some protesters from asking for reforms which included writing a new constitution to calling for an end to the monarchy. According to the Bahrain Mirror, the phrase "after Thursday, we stopped the talking; the people want to overthrow the regime" (Arabic: من بعد الخميس أنهينا الكلام، الشعب يريد إسقاط النظام) became popular in later protests. On 22 February, a mass rally dubbed the March of loyalty to martyrs was held in honour of the four protesters who had lost their lives during the day; over 100,000 people took part in the protest. The Al Jazeera English documentary Bahrain: Shouting in the Dark also features the events of the day.

== See also ==
- Human rights in Bahrain
