= Abdulhussain bin Ali Mirza =

Abdulhussain bin Ali Mirza is the current head of Sustainable Energy Authority and former Minister of Electricity and Water Affairs of Bahrain.

== Education ==
Mirza holds a PhD in management change from Middlesex University in London.

== Career ==
Mirza was the minister of state, the minister of state for cabinet affairs and also the chairman of the Tender Board. In 2006, Mirza was given the newly established ministerial portfolio of oil and gas affairs. He is also the head of the National Oil and Gas Authority which he has held since before his ministerial appointment. In 2011 the Electricity and Water Authority was merged with the ministry of oil and gas affairs, and Mirza was appointed Minister of Energy in January 2015. In June 2016, he was appointed Minister of Electricity and Water Affairs.
