= National Oil and Gas Authority =

Bahraini government agency

Bahrain National Oil and Gas Authority
- الهيئة الوطنية للنفط والغاز

Agency overview
- Jurisdiction: Government of Bahrain
- Headquarters: Manama, Bahrain
- Agency executive: Mohammed bin Khalifa bin Ahmed, Minister
- Website: Official website

The National Oil and Gas Authority (Arabic: الهيئة الوطنية للنفط والغاز) was the governmental body in Bahrain responsible for developing and implementing the government policy for exploiting the country's oil and gas resources.

Nogaholding was established in August 2007 as a subsidiary unit of NOGA. Nogaholding was intended to concentrate and refocus NOGA's oil, gas, and petrochemical development activities.

NOGA was abolished in September 2021, and all its activities, responsibilities, and personnel were transferred to Bahrain's Ministry of Oil. Nogaholding became a semi-independent agency within the Ministry of Oil.
