= Isa bin Ibrahim Al Khalifa =

Bahraini soldier and politician

Sheikh Isa bin Ibrahim bin Mohammed bin Isa Al Khalifa (Arabic: عيسى بن إبراهيم بن محمد بن عيسى آل خليفة, born in 1941 in Muharraq, Bahrain, died in 2010 in West Riffa, Bahrain) was a Bahraini soldier and politician.

== Biography ==
He served in the Bahrain Defence Force but was best known for being Director-General of the General Organization for Pension Funds from August 1976 to April 2004. During his term, the administrative system was modernized, financial investments were developed, and actuarial bankruptcy was separated from the social insurance field. He served from 1993 until his death on the board of directors of the House of Khalifa and as Advisor to the Crown Prince's Court from 2004 until his death.

== Awards ==
In December 2000, he was awarded the Order of Sheikh Isa bin Salman Al Khalifa, First Class.

== Death ==
He died on July 6, 2010, at the age of 69 and was buried in the Hunainiyah Cemetery in Riffa.

== Personal life ==
He had four children: Ahmad, Salman, Hamad, and Ibrahim.

His sister, Sabika bint Ibrahim Al Khalifa, is the first wife of King Hamad bin Isa Al Khalifa.
