= Khalifa bin Ahmed Al Khalifa =

Bahraini military officer

Sheikh Khalifa bin Ahmed Al Khalifa
- خليفة بن أحمد آل خليفة
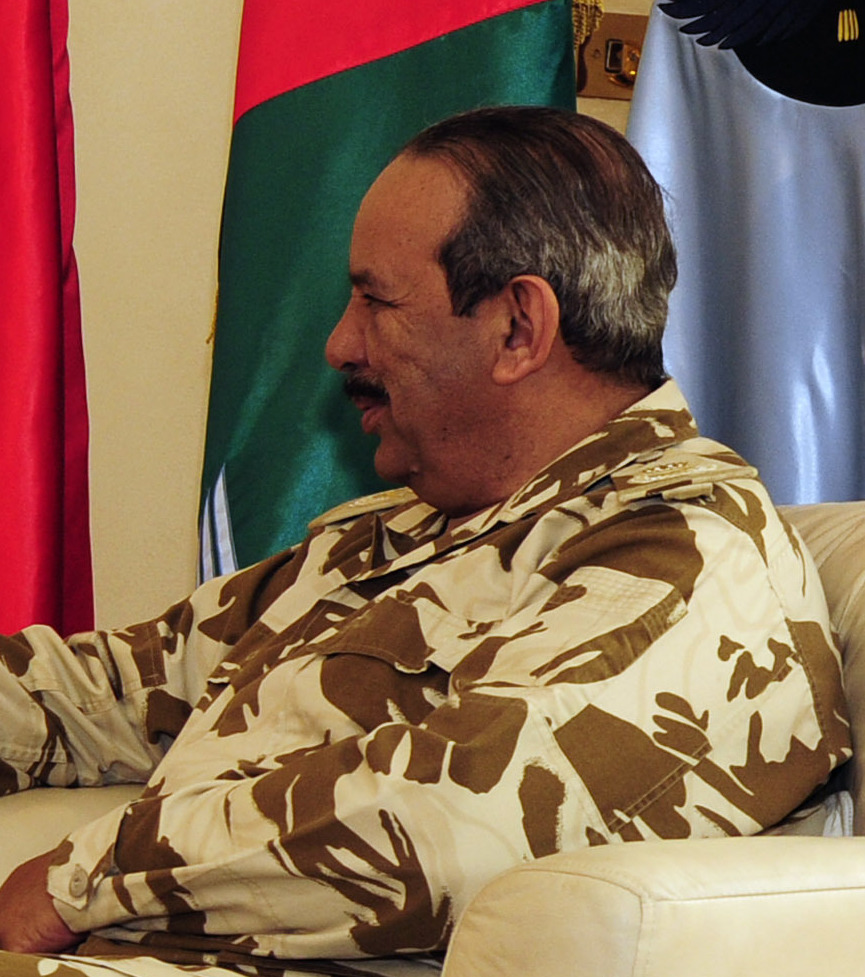

Commander-in-Chief of the Bahrain Defence Force
- Incumbent
- Assumed office January 6, 2008
- Monarch: Hamad bin Isa Al Khalifa
- Preceded by: Salman, Crown Prince of Bahrain

Minister of Defense Deputy Commander-in-Chief of the Bahrain Defence Force
- In office March 31, 1988 – January 6, 2008

Chief of Staff of the Bahrain Defence Force
- In office January 19, 1974 – March 31, 1988
- Monarch: Isa bin Salman Al Khalifa

Personal details
- Born: 1946 (age 79–80) Bahrain
- Education: Royal Military Academy Sandhurst

Military service
- Allegiance: Bahrain
- Branch/service: Royal Bahraini Army
- Years of service: 1968–present
- Rank: Field marshal
- Battles/wars: 2026 Iran war

Field marshal Khalifa bin Ahmed Al Khalifa (Arabic: خليفة بن أحمد آل خليفة, born 1946) is a Bahraini soldier who serves as Commander-in-Chief of the Bahrain Defence Force (BDF) since 2008.

== Biography ==
Enrolling at the Royal Military Academy Sandhurst on December 19, 1968, Al Khalifa also completed many military courses in Arab countries and elsewhere along with a master's degree in military science from the Joint Services Command and Staff College of the United Kingdom on October 27, 1972. He was meanwhile appointed assistant commander of the recruits at the BDF Training Center on April 10, 1968, and led the graduation column for the first batch of recruits of the BDF in 1969, later that year becoming commander of the 1st Mechanized Infantry Battalion.

On January 19, 1974, Emir Isa bin Salman Al Khalifa appointed him Chief of Staff of the BDF. This was followed on March 13, 1988, by Khalifa bin Ahmed being named Deputy Commander-in-Chief and Minister of Defense. On January 29, 2001, Emir and soon-to-be King of Bahrain Hamad bin Isa Al Khalifa promoted Khalifa bin Ahmed to Lieutenant-General, followed by the titles of BDF Commander-in-Chief on January 6, 2008, and the rank of field marshal on February 8, 2011.

== Awards ==
- Order of Ahmed al-Fateh
- Order of Sheikh Isa bin Salman Al Khalifa
- Bahrain Medal
- Military Service Appreciation Medal
- Military Duty Medal
- Kuwait Liberation Medal
- United States Legion of Merit
- Saudi Arabian Peninsula Shield Medal
- United Arab Emirates Gulf Cooperation Council Medal
- Order of the Star of Jordan
- Order of the Republic (Egypt)
- Order of the Two Rivers
- International Military Sports Council Medal
