= Bin Ibrahim =

bin Ibrahim or ben Ibrahim is an Arabic patronymic meaning "son of Ibrahim". Similarly, bint Ibrahim means "daughter of Ibrahim". Notable people with this patronymic include:

== bin/ben ==
- Abu Ja'far Aḥmad ben Yusuf ben Ibrahim
- Adel bin Ibrahim Hkiml
- Ahmad bin Ibrahim
- Ahmad bin Ibrahim Badr
- Al-Abbas bin Ibrahim as-Samlali
- Anwar bin Ibrahim
- Hamad bin Ibrahim Al Mualla
- Hatim bin Ibrahim
- Isa bin Ibrahim Al Khalifa
- Mohammed bin Ibrahim Al Mutawa
- Muhammad bin Ibrahim
- Muhammad Faishal bin Ibrahim
- Ramlan Bin Ibrahim
- Salman bin Ibrahim Al Khalifa
- Salman Bin Ibrahim Bin Mohammed Bin Ali Al-Kalifa
- Tunku Abdul Aziz bin Ibrahim
- Waleed bin Ibrahim Al Ibrahim
- Yahya bin Ibrahim

== bint ==
- Al Jawhara bint Ibrahim Al Ibrahim
- Reem Bint Ibrahim Al Hashimy
- Sabika bint Ibrahim Al Khalifa
- Sameera bint Ibrahim Rajab
