= Commander-in-Chief of the Bahrain Defence Force =

Commander-in-Chief of Bahrain

- Arabic: القائد العام لقوة دفاع البحرين
- Flag of the Bahrain Defence Force

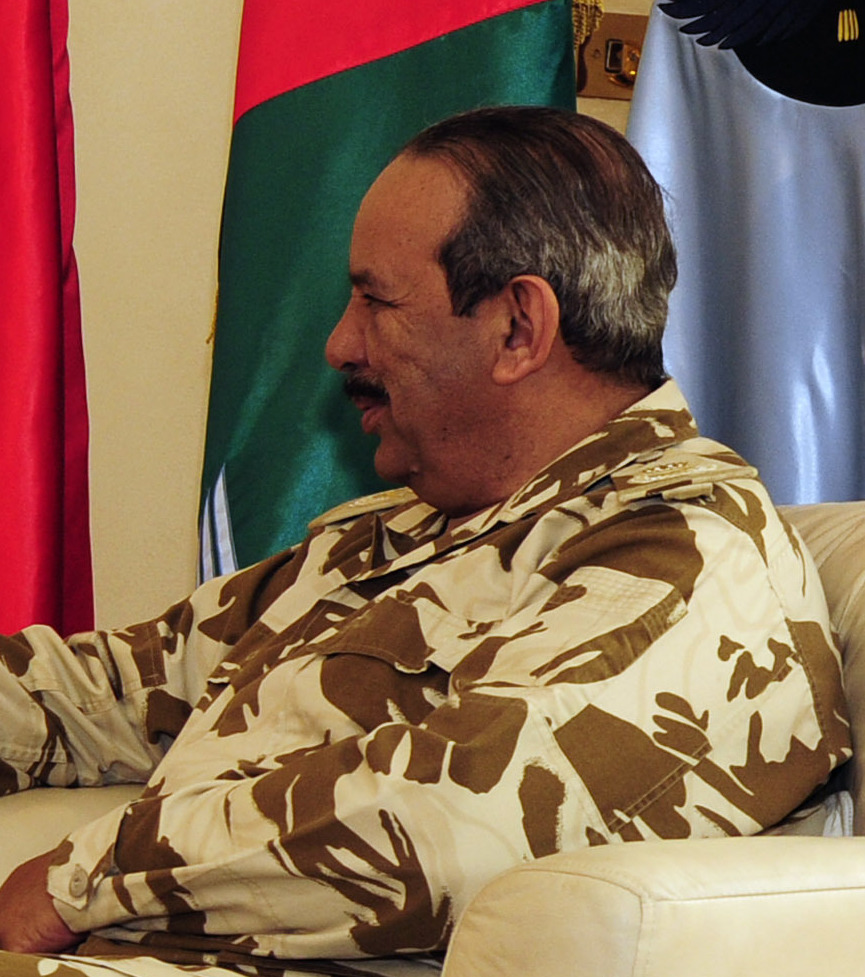
- Incumbent; Field Marshal Khalifa bin Ahmed Al Khalifa since 6 January 2008
- Bahrain Defence Force
- Reports to: Supreme Commander of the Bahrain Defence Force
- Seat: BDF General Command, Riffa, Bahrain
- Appointer: The King
- Term length: At His Majesty's pleasure
- Formation: 1977
- First holder: Hamad bin Isa Al Khalifa
- Deputy: Chief of Staff of the Bahrain Defence Force

The Commander-in-Chief of the Bahrain Defence Force (Arabic: القائد العام لقوة دفاع البحرين) is the operational head of the Bahrain Defence Force (BDF), the armed forces of the Kingdom of Bahrain. The Commander-in-Chief exercises direct operational command and administrative oversight over the BDF, reporting to the King of Bahrain as Supreme Commander and the Crown Prince of Bahrain as Deputy Supreme Commander. Field Marshal Khalifa bin Ahmed Al Khalifa has served as the Commander-in-Chief since 6 January 2008. Core responsibilities of the Commander-in-Chief include:

- Directing combat readiness, strategic planning, and operations across the BDF.
- Overseeing weapons procurement, defense infrastructure, and joint military exercises.
- Representing the BDF within the Gulf Cooperation Council Unified Military Command.

== History ==
The position was formally established in 1977 by Emir Isa bin Salman Al Khalifa, who combined the posts of Minister of Defense and Commander-in-Chief, appointing his eldest son Sheikh Hamad bin Isa Al Khalifa to lead and restructure the military. The ministerial and operational roles were separated in March 1988 with the appointment of Major General Khalifa bin Ahmed Al Khalifa as Minister of Defense and Deputy Commander-in-Chief.

== List of Commanders-in-Chief ==
No.	Portrait	Name	Took office	Left office	Time in office	Monarch	Ref.
1		General; Hamad bin Isa Al Khalifa (born 1950)	1977	6 March 1999	21–22 years	Isa bin Salman Al Khalifa	
2		General; Salman bin Hamad Al Khalifa (born 1969)	22 March 1999	6 January 2008	8 years, 290 days	Hamad bin Isa Al Khalifa	
3		Field Marshal; Khalifa bin Ahmed Al Khalifa (born 1946)	6 January 2008	Present	18 years, 320 days	Hamad bin Isa Al Khalifa	

== See also ==
- Bahrain Defence Force
- Military ranks of Bahrain
- Cabinet of Bahrain
