= Khalid bin Hamad Al Khalifa =

Bahraini royal (born 1989)

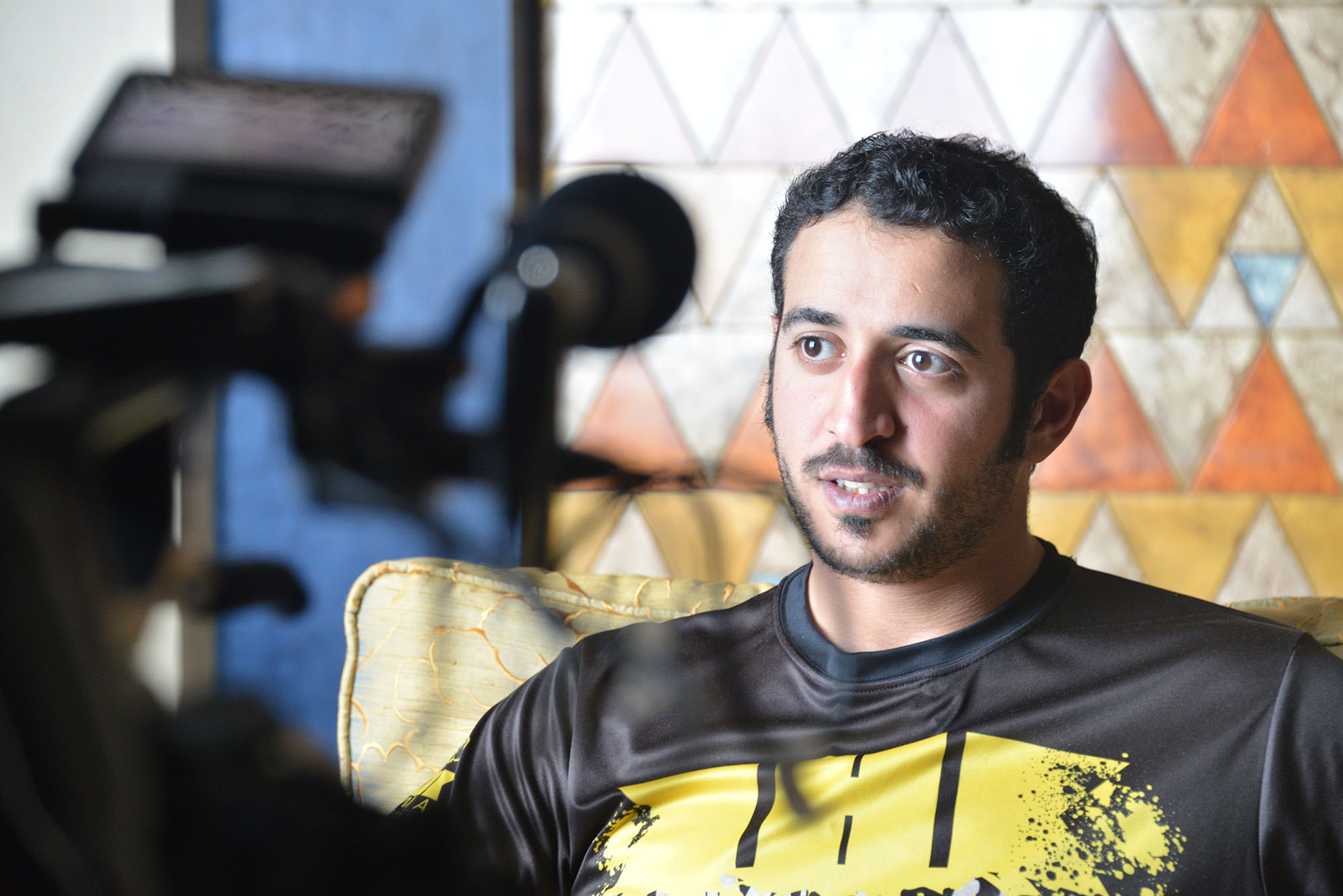
- Khalid in 2016
- Born: 23 September 1989 (age 37)
- Spouse: Sahab bint Abdullah Al Saud (m. 2011; div. 2017) Hessa bint Mohammed bin Isa Al Khalifa (m. 2017) Nouf Al Ajmi (m. 2019)
- Issue: Faisal bin Khalid Al Khalifa; Abdullah bin Khalid Al Khalifa; Munirah bint Khalid Al Khalifa; Nasser bin Khalid Al Khalifa; Isa bin Khalid Al Khalifa; Salman bin Khalid Al Khalifa; Hamad bin Khalid Al khalifa
- House: Khalifa
- Father: Hamad bin Isa Al Khalifa
- Mother: Sheia bint Hassan Al Khrayyesh Al Ajmi
- Military career
- Allegiance: Bahrain
- Branch: Royal Guard
- Service years: 2008–present
- Rank: Brigadier General
- Commands: Commander of the Special Operations
- Conflicts: Yemeni Civil War: Operation Restoring Hope

Khalid bin Hamad Al Khalifa (Arabic: خالد بن حمد آل خليفة; born 23 September 1989) is a member of the Bahraini royal family, and a Bahraini military officer. He is the fifth son of King Hamad bin Isa Al Khalifa.

== Early life and education ==
Khalid bin Hamad was born on 23 September 1989, the fifth son of Bahraini King Hamad and Sheia bint Hassan Al Khrayyesh Al Ajmi of Kuwait, the king’s second wife.

He attended Ibn Khuldoon National School and then graduated from Royal Military Academy Sandhurst in August 2008.

== Career ==
He is a military officer with the rank of Major and commands Royal Guard's Rapid Intervention Force. He is the president of the Bahrain Royal Equestrian and Endurance Federation and the first deputy chairman of the Supreme Council for Youth and Sports.

=== Mixed Martial Arts ===
From 2016-2017, Al Khalifa participated in two amateur MMA bouts, winning his debut via TKO in the first round against Aditya PS, and his second bout via unanimous decision against Manish Kumar.

In 2016, Al Khalifa founded the MMA promotion Brave Combat Federation.

== Personal life ==
Khalid bin Hamad married Sahab bint Abdullah Al Saud (born 14 February 1993), daughter of Saudi Arabia's former ruler King Abdullah, on 16 June 2011 in Riyadh. The couple divorced six years later, in 2017. They share two sons:

- Faisal (b. 12 December 2012)
- Abdullah (b. 6 February 2015)

In 2017, Al Khalifa married Hessa, the daughter of Mohammed bin Isa Al Khalifa, chief of the National Guard.
