= Crown Prince of Bahrain =

Heir apparent to the King of Bahrain

Crown Prince of the Kingdom of Bahrain
- ولي عهد مملكة البحرين; Waliu Eahd Mamlakat al-Bahrayn
- Arms of His Highness the Crown Prince of the Kingdom of Bahrain

Incumbent
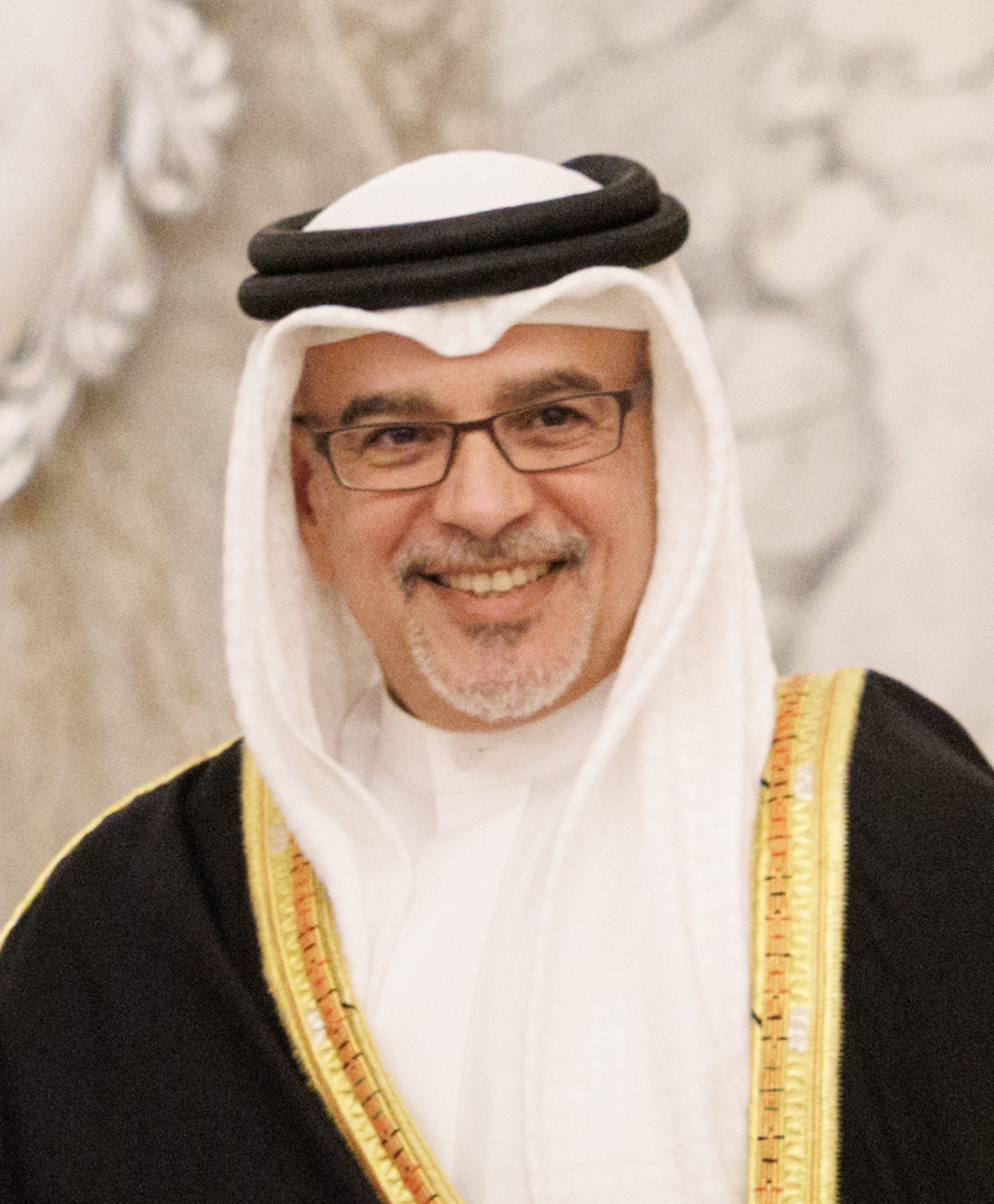
- Salman bin Hamad Al Khalifa since 9 March 1999

Details
- Style: His Highness
- First monarch: Salman bin Hamad Al Khalifa

The crown prince of the Kingdom of Bahrain (Arabic: ولي عهد مملكة البحرين) is the heir apparent to the King of Bahrain and official heir presumptive to the King.

Salman bin Hamad Al Khalifa was sworn in as Crown Prince of the Kingdom of Bahrain on 9 March 1999 and held the post of commander-in-chief of the Bahrain Defence Force from 22 March 1999 to 6 January 2008.

== Present Line of succession ==
The succession of the Kingdom of Bahrain throne is determined by agnatic primogeniture amongst the male descendants of King Hamad bin Isa Al Khalifa. However, the ruling King of Bahrain has the right to appoint any of his other sons as his successor according to article 1 of the Constitution of Bahrain.

- Hakim Isa I al-Khalifa (1848–1932)
  - Hakim Hamad I al-Khalifa (1872–1942)
    - Hakim Salman al-Khalifa (1894–1961)
      - Emir Isa II al-Khalifa (1931–1999)
        - King Hamad II al-Khalifa (born 1950)
          - (1) Crown Prince Salman bin Hamad Al Khalifa (born 1969)
            - (2) Isa bin Salman Al Khalifa (born 1990)
              - (3) Hamad bin Isa Al Khalifa (born 2014)
              - (4) Abdullah bin Isa Al Khalifa (born 2016)
              - (5) Salman bin Isa Al Khalifa (born 2020)
            - (6) Mohammed bin Salman Al Khalifa (born 1991)
              - (7) Ahmad bin Mohammed Al Khalifa (born 2018)
          - (8) Abdullah bin Hamad Al Khalifa (born 1976)
            - (9) Isa bin Abdullah Al Khalifa (born 1999)
            - (10) Salman bin Abdullah Al Khalifa (born 2004)
          - (11) Khalifa bin Hamad Al Khalifa (born 1978)
            - (12) Mohammed bin Khalifa Al Khalifa (born 2006)
            - (13) Salman bin Khalifa Al Khalifa (born 2008)
          - (14) Nasser bin Hamad Al Khalifa (born 1987)
            - (15) Hamad bin Nasser Al Khalifa (born 2012)
            - (16) Mohammed bin Nasser Al Khalifa (born 2012)
            - (17) Hamdan bin Nasser Al Khalifa (born 2018)
            - (18) Khalid bin Nasser Al Khalifa (born 2022)
          - (19) Khalid bin Hamad Al Khalifa (born 1988)
            - (20) Faisal bin Khalid Al Khalifa (born 2012)
            - (21) Abdullah bin Khalid Al Khalifa (born 2015)
            - (22) Nasser bin Khalid Al Khalifa (born 2021)
            - (23) Salman bin Khalid Al Khalifa (born 2021)
            - (24) Hamad bin Khalid Al Khalifa (born 2024)
          - (25) Sultan bin Hamad Al Khalifa
        - Rashid bin Isa Al Khalifa (d. 2010)
          - (26) Turki bin Rashid Al Khalifa
          - (27) Mohammed bin Rashid Al Khalifa
          - (28) Faisal bin Rashid Al Khalifa
          - (29) Abdullah bin Rashid Al Khalifa
          - (30) Salman bin Rashid Al Khalifa (born in 1988 or 1986)
          - (31) Nawaf bin Rashid Al Khalifa (born 1993)
          - (32) Isa bin Rashid Al Khalifa (born 1995)
          - (33) Ibrahim bin Rashid Al Khalifa (born 1996)
        - (34) Mohammed bin Isa Al Khalifa
          - (35) Isa bin Mohammed Al Khalifa
          - (36) Salman bin Mohammed Al Khalifa
        - (37) Abdullah bin Isa Al Khalifa
          - (38) Hamad bin Abdullah Al Khalifa
          - (39) Isa bin Abdullah Al Khalifa
          - (40) Mohammed bin Abdullah Al Khalifa
        - (41) Ali bin Isa Al Khalifa
          - (42) Isa bin Ali Al Khalifa
          - (43) Khalid bin Ali Al Khalifa
          - (44) Khalifa bin Ali Al Khalifa
      - Khalifa bin Salman Al Khalifa (1935-2020)
        - (45) Ali bin Khalifa Al Khalifa
          - (46) Khalifa bin Ali Al Khalifa
          - (47) Isa bin Ali Al Khalifa
        - (48) Sheikh Salman bin Khalifa Al Khalifa
      - Mohammed bin Salman Al Khalifa (1940-2009)
        - (49) Ahmad bin Mohammed Al Khalifa
        - (50) Hamad bin Mohammed Al Khalifa
        - (51) Khalid bin Mohammed Al Khalifa
        - (52) Khalifa bin Mohammed Al Khalifa
        - (53) Salman bin Mohammed Al Khalifa
        - (54) Abdullah bin Mohammed Al Khalifa
        - (55) Sultan bin Mohammed Al Khalifa
        - (56) Hashim bin Mohammed Al Khalifa
          - (57) Mohammed bin Hashim Al Khalifa
        - (58) Nadir bin Mohammed Al Khalifa
        - (59) Ali Zain al-Abideen bin Mohammed Al Khalifa
        - (60) Isa bin Mohammed Al Khalifa

After Isa bin Mohammed Al Khalifa come firstly the descendants of Hakim Hamad bin Isa Al Khalifa, and then last in line the descendants of Hakim Isa bin Ali Al Khalifa.

== See also ==
- Politics of Bahrain
- King of Bahrain
