= Khalifa bin Duaij Al Khalifa =

Bahraini politician

Sheikh Khalifa bin Duaij bin Khalifa bin Muhammad bin Isa Al Khalifa (Arabic: خليفة بن دعيج بن خليفة بن محمد بن عيسى آل خليفة) is a Bahraini politician. He has led the Court of the Crown Prince since 2005.
