= Military ranks of Bahrain =

The military ranks of Bahrain are the military insignia used by the Bahrain Defence Force.

== Commissioned officer ranks ==
The rank insignia of commissioned officers is based on those of the British Army, reflecting British colonial influence. In place of the Bath star "pip" in the British system a five pointed star is used. Two crossed sabres are used in lieu of the crossed sabre and baton used in the British system for general officers.

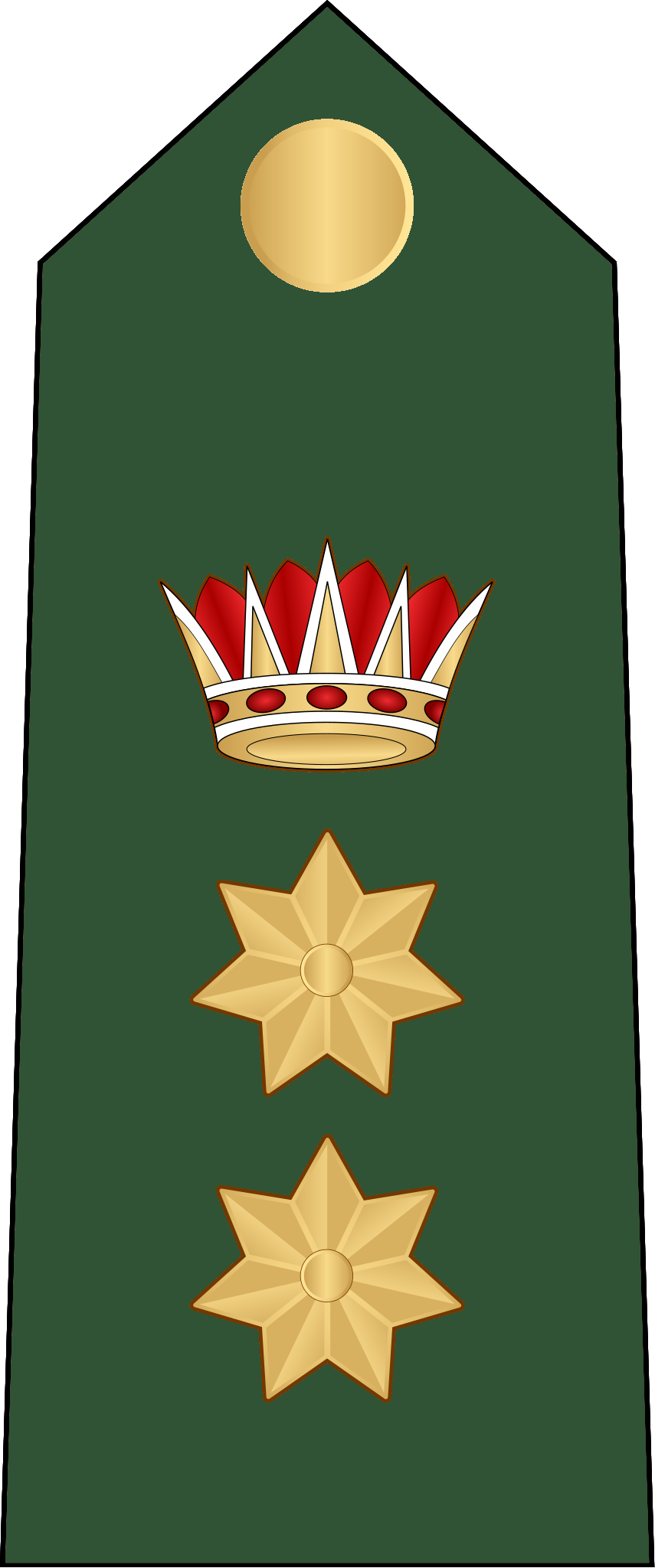
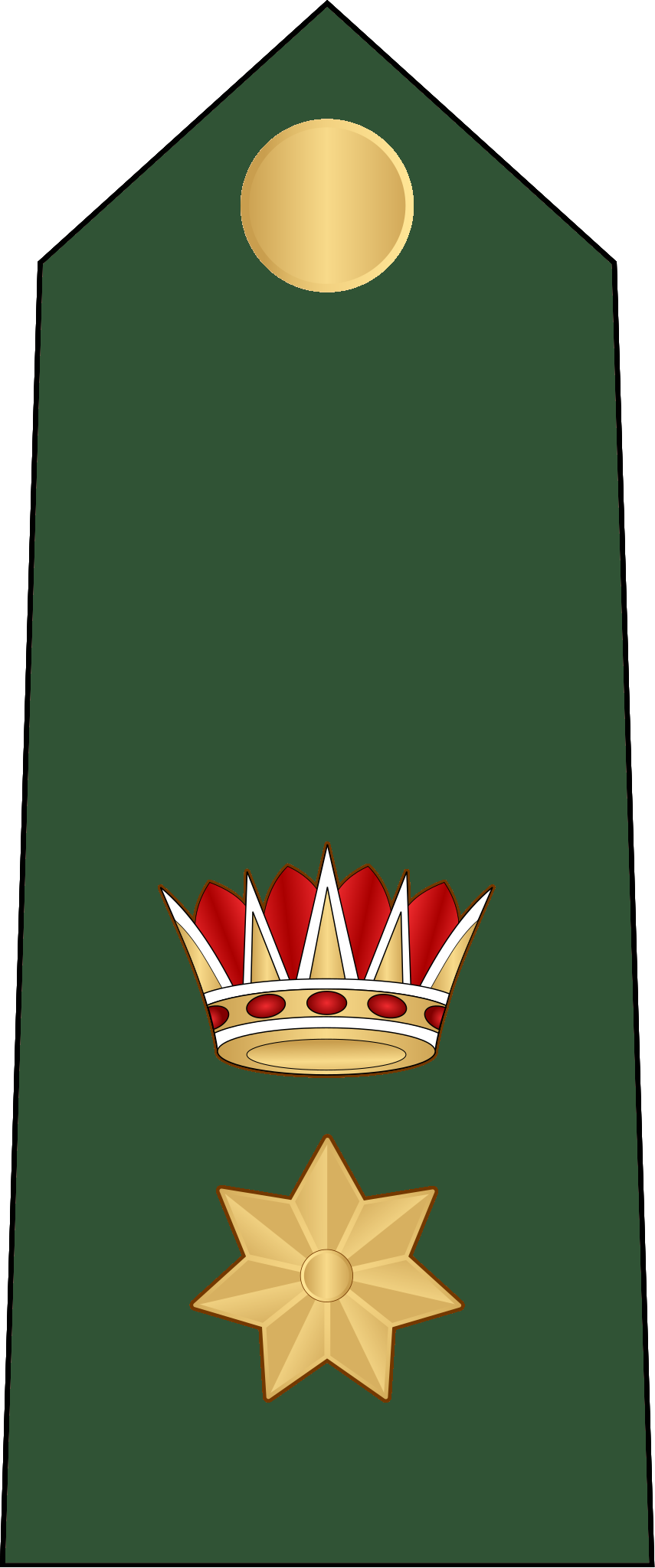
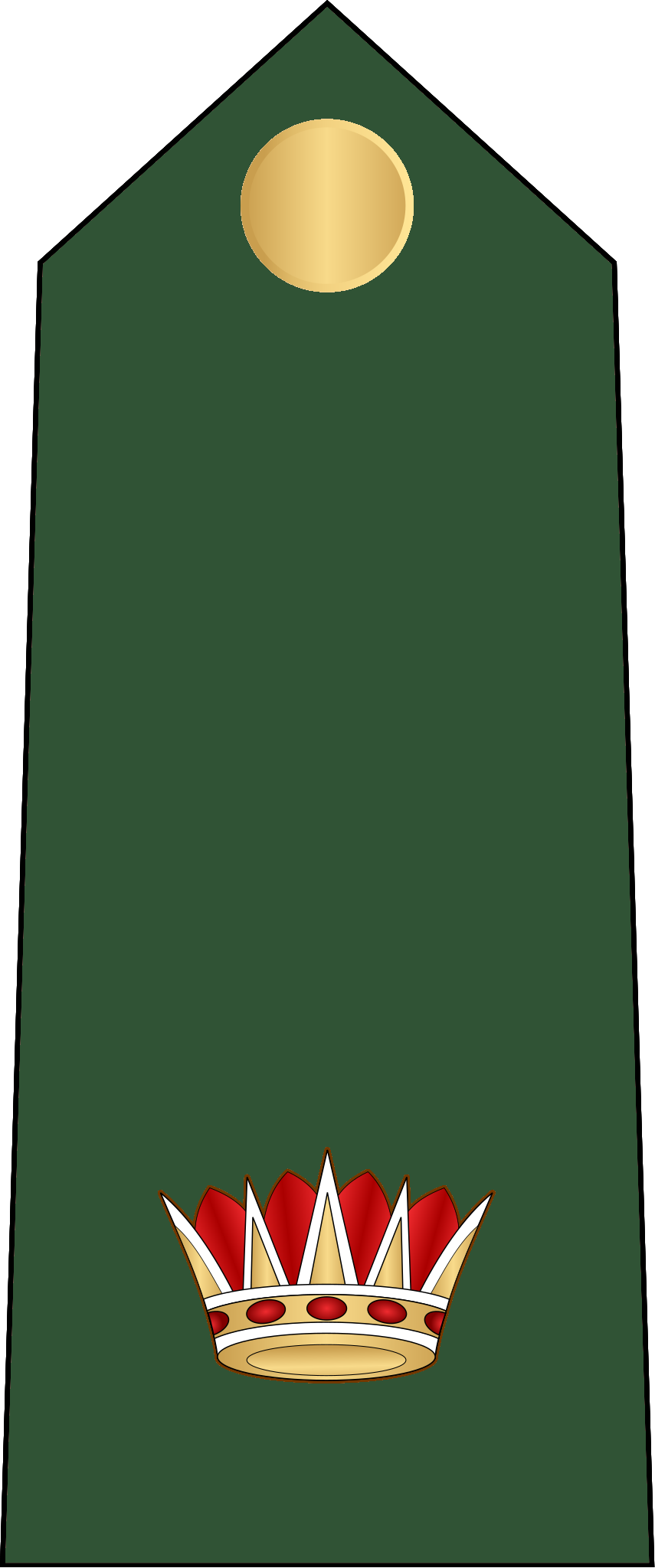
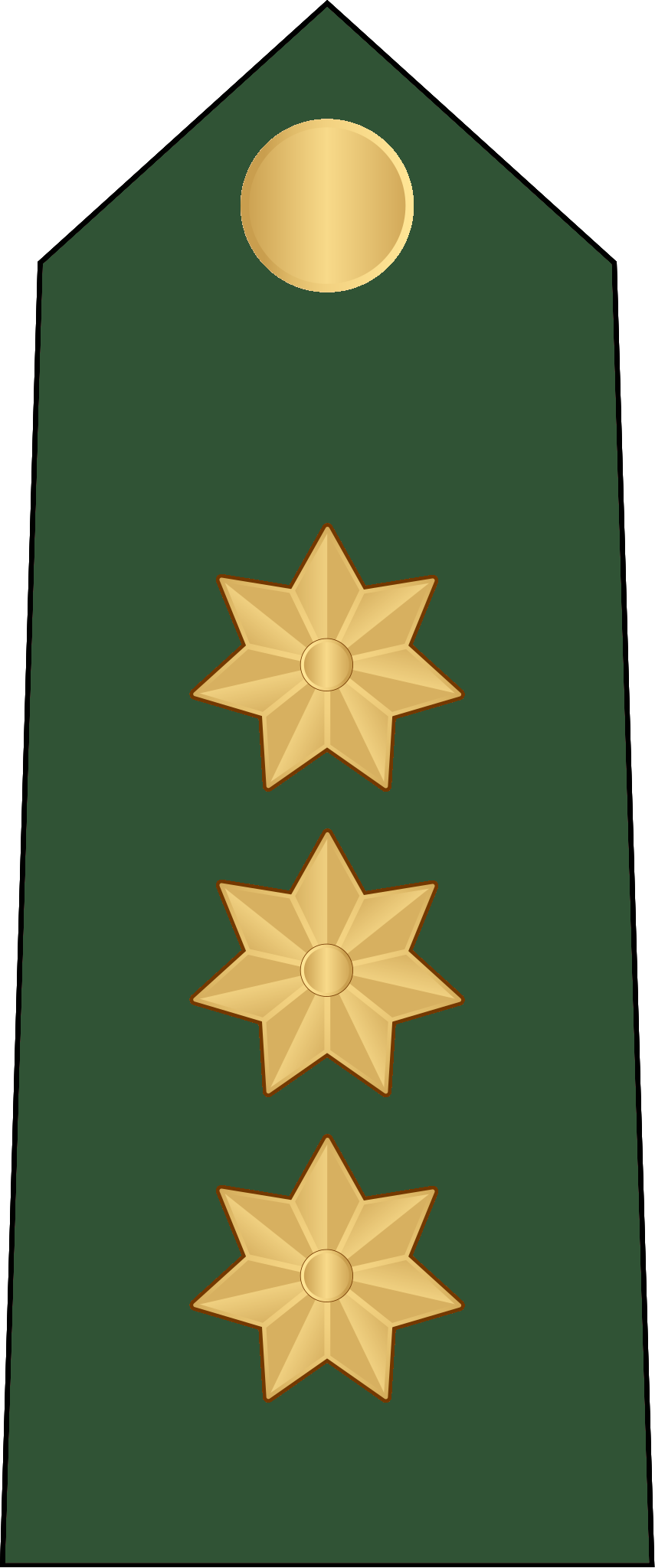
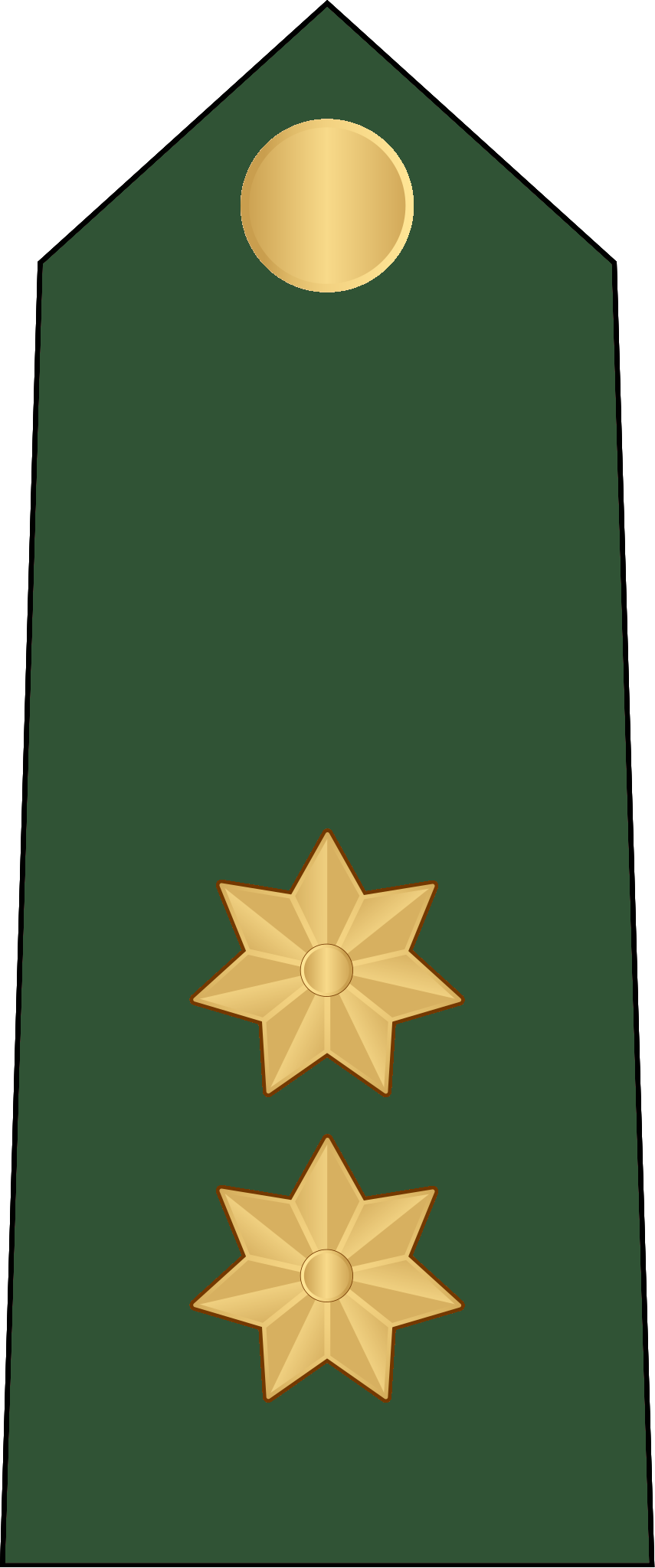
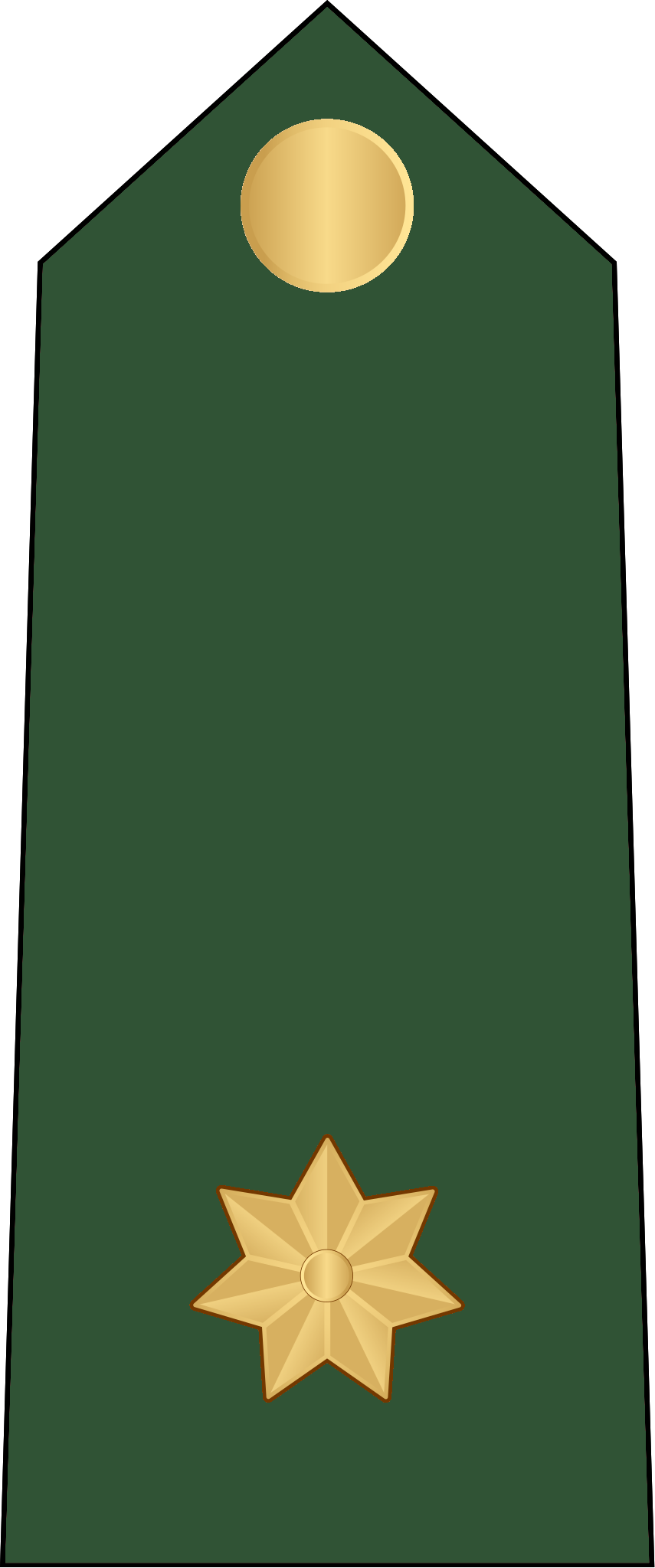
Rank group	General / flag officers					Senior officers			Junior officers
Royal Bahraini Army
Royal Bahraini Army	مشیر; Mushir	فريق أول; Fariq 'awal	فريق; Fariq	لواء; Liwa	عميد; Amid	عقيد; Aqid	مقدم; Muqaddam	رائد; Ra'id	نقيب; Naqib	ملازم أول; Mulazim awwal	ملازم; Mulazim
Royal Bahraini Naval Force
Royal Bahraini Naval Force	مشیر; Mushir	فريق أول; Fariq 'awal	فريق; Fariq	لواء; Liwa	عميد; Amid	عقيد; Aqid	مقدم; Muqaddam	رائد; Ra'id	نقيب; Naqib	ملازم أول; Mulazim awwal	ملازم; Mulazim
Royal Bahraini Air Force
Royal Bahraini Air Force	مشیر; Mushir	فريق أول; Fariq 'awal	فريق; Fariq	لواء; Liwa	عميد; Amid	عقيد; Aqid	مقدم; Muqaddam	رائد; Ra'id	نقيب; Naqib	ملازم أول; Mulazim awwal	ملازم; Mulazim
Royal Guard of Bahrain
Royal Guard of Bahrain			فريق; Fariq	لواء; Liwa	عميد; Amid	عقيد; Aqid	مقدم; Muqaddam	رائد; Ra'id	نقيب; Naqib	ملازم أول; Mulazim awwal	ملازم; Mulazim
National Guard of Bahrain
National Guard of Bahrain			فريق; Fariq	لواء; Liwa	عميد; Amid	عقيد; Aqid	مقدم; Muqaddam	رائد; Ra'id	نقيب; Naqib	ملازم أول; Mulazim awwal	ملازم; Mulazim
Rank group	General / flag officers					Senior officers			Junior officers

== Other ranks ==
The rank insignia of non-commissioned officers and enlisted personnel.

Rank group	Senior NCOs		Junior NCOs	Enlisted
Royal Bahraini Army					No insignia
Royal Bahraini Army	رقیب أول; Raqib 'awal	رقیب; Raqib	عريف; Earif	جندي أول; Jundiun awwal	جندي; Jundiun
Royal Bahraini Naval Force					No insignia
Royal Bahraini Naval Force	رقیب أول; Raqib 'awal	رقیب; Raqib	عريف; Earif	جندي أول; Jundiun awwal	جندي; Jundiun
Royal Bahraini Air Force					No insignia
Royal Bahraini Air Force	رقیب أول; Raqib 'awal	رقیب; Raqib	عريف; Earif	جندي أول; Jundiun awwal	جندي; Jundiun
Royal Guard of Bahrain					No insignia
Royal Guard of Bahrain	رقیب أول; Raqib 'awal	رقیب; Raqib	عريف; Earif	جندي أول; Jundiun awwal	جندي; Jundiun
National Guard of Bahrain					No insignia
National Guard of Bahrain	رقیب أول; Raqib 'awal	رقیب; Raqib	عريف; Earif	جندي أول; Jundiun awwal	جندي; Jundiun
Rank group	Senior NCOs		Junior NCOs	Enlisted
