= Mohammed bin Isa Al Khalifa =

Bahraini royalty and government official

- Born: Mohammed bin Isa bin Salman bin Hamad bin Isa bin Ali bin Khalifa bin Salman bin Ahmed bin Mohammed bin Khalifa; December 18, 1960 (age 65)
- Issue: Salman
- House: Khalifa
- Father: Isa bin Salman Al Khalifa
- Mother: Hessa bint Salman Al Khalifa
- Military career
- Branch: Bahrain National Guard
- Service years: 1997–present
- Rank: General
- Commands: Commander of the National Guard

Styles of Mohammed bin Isa Al Khalifa
- Reference style: His Highness
- Spoken style: Your Highness
- Alternative style: Sheikh

Sheikh Mohammed bin Isa Al Khalifa (Arabic: محمد بن عيسى آل خليفة, born 1960) is a member of the Bahraini royal family and a military officer who serves as the Commander of the Bahrain National Guard.

== Biography ==
He is the third son of late Emir Isa bin Salman Al Khalifa and the younger brother of King Hamad bin Isa Al Khalifa.

After graduating from the Military school he joined the Royal Bahraini Naval Force, he was the head of the Bahrain Football Association between 1988 and 1996.

On January 7, 1997, Emir Isa bin Salman Al Khalifa appointed the then Brigadier General Mohammed bin Isa Al Khalifa as the Commander of the National Guard. On February 4, 2000, he was promoted to Major General. On December 12, 2009, he was promoted to Lieutenant-General and then to General on January 6, 2019.

== Awards ==
- Order of Ahmed al-Fateh
- Order of Sheikh Isa bin Salman Al Khalifa
- Bahrain Medal
- Military Service Appreciation Medal
- Military Duty Medal
- Kuwait Liberation Medal
- Saudi Arabian Peninsula Shield Medal
- Nishan-e-Imtiaz (Pakistan)
