= Royal Guard (Bahrain) =

Military unit charged with protecting the King of Bahrain

Royal Guard of Bahrain
- الحرس الملكي
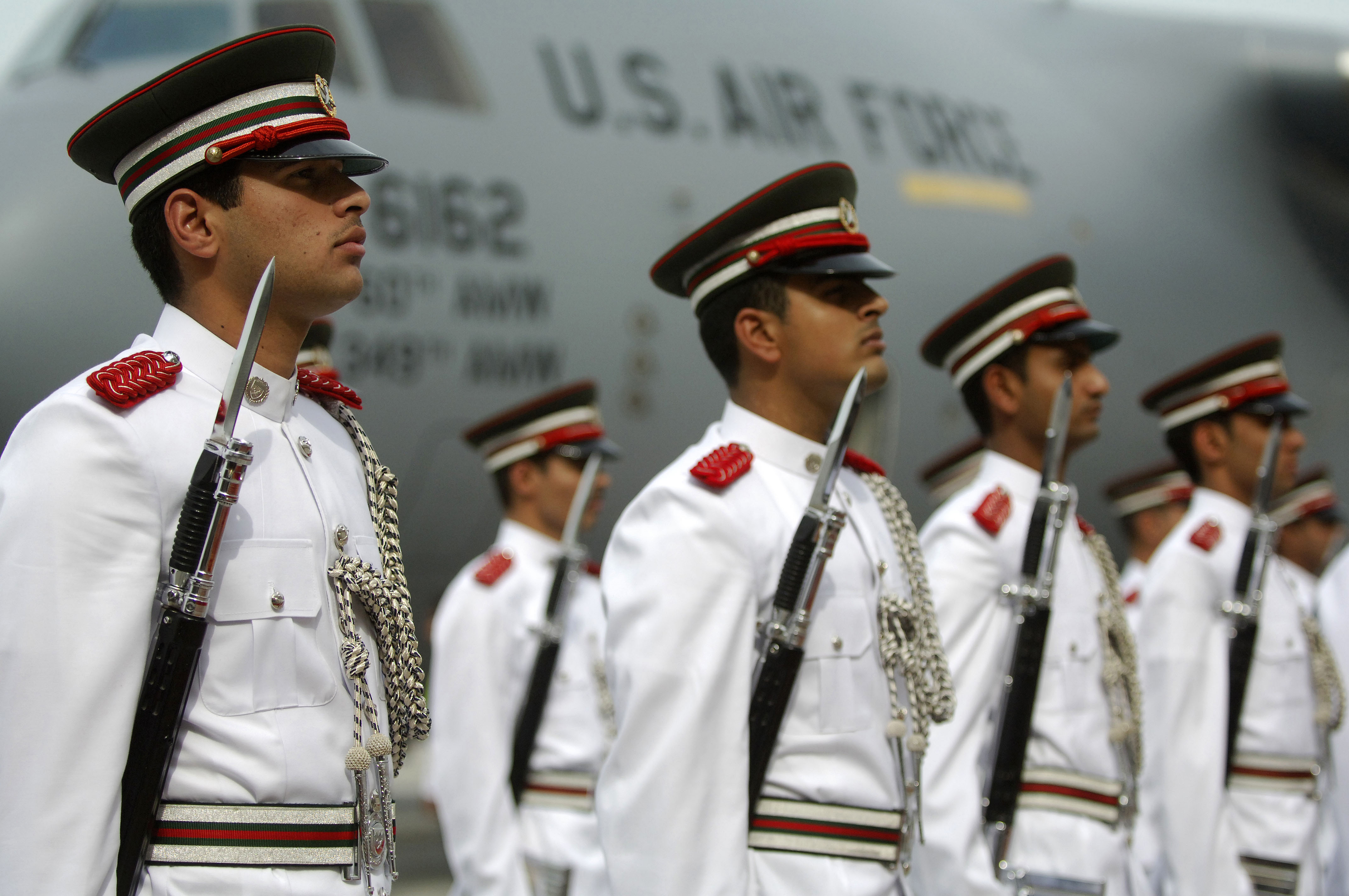
- The Royal Guard during the visit of US Secretary of Defense Robert Gates in December 2007.
- Active: 1989–present
- Country: Bahrain
- Allegiance: House of Khalifa
- Type: Royal guard
- Role: Public duties Royal security
- Part of: Bahrain Defence Force
- Garrison/HQ: Manama

Commanders
- Commander of the Royal Guard: Major General Nasser bin Hamad Al Khalifa

Insignia
- Royal Guard flag

The Royal Guard (Arabic: الحرس الملكي) of Bahrain is a unit of the Bahrain Defence Force. In June 2011, King Hamad bin Isa Al Khalifa appointed his 36-year-old son Nasser bin Hamad Al Khalifa as the commander of the Royal Guard.

== Operations ==
The Royal Guard have worked with overseas militaries. In 2019, they received training from the British Army's Royal Military Police. The relationship with the military of the United Kingdom also involved competing in boxing competitions. In 2023, they engaged in joint military exercises with the Saudi Arabian Royal Guard.

In addition to taking on a military role, the Royal Guard often take part in state-supported civilian roles. In 2022, the Royal Guard's cavalry unit took part in a parade in London to celebrate the Platinum Jubilee of Queen Elizabeth II. In 2021, when a detachment of Royal Guard soldiers climbed Mount Everest and raised the flag of Bahrain on the summit. Sheikh Nasser won endurance races in the United Kingdom whilst representing the Royal Guard in 2025.

== Criticism ==
The Opposition political leader Ali Salman claimed in 2009 that "no Shi'ites have been recruited to work in the Royal Guard even though they make up over half of the population." In 2014, Sheikh Nasser was accused of using the Royal Guard during the 2011 Bahraini uprising to torture Shi'ite clerics. As a result of these, the High Court of England and Wales upheld a government decision to strip him of his recognised diplomatic immunity within the United Kingdom.

== See also ==
- National Guard (Bahrain)
- Royal Guard
