= Hala bint D'aij Al Khalifa =

Bahraini royal

- Born: 1973; Bahrain
- Died: 10 June 2018 (aged 44); Bahrain
- Spouse: Salman bin Hamad bin Isa Al Khalifa (m. 1989; div. 2005)
- Issue: Isa; Mohammed; Fatima; Al Joud
- House: Khalifa
- Father: Sheikh Duaij bin Khalifa Al Khalifa
- Mother: Sheikha Aisha

Sheikha Hala bint Duaij Al Khalifa (Arabic: هالة بنت دعيج آل خليفة, died 10 June 2018) was the former wife of Prince Salman bin Hamad bin Isa Al Khalifa, the Crown Prince, Deputy Supreme Commander and First Deputy Prime Minister, until 2005. Hala was the youngest daughter of Sheikh Duaij bin Khalifa Al Khalifa, the Assistant Under-Secretary of the Ministry of Finance & National Economy. She was the Honorary President of the Information Centre for Women & Children, and Chair of the Bahrain Society for Mental Retardation.

Hala and Salman had two sons and two daughters:

- Isa bin Salman Al Khalifa, currently attending American University in Washington DC.
- Mohammed bin Salman Al Khalifa (born 1993), educated at the Bahrain School. Graduated from the Royal Military Academy Sandhurst in 2011.
- Fatima Al Dana bint Salman Al Khalifa
- Joud bint Salman Al Khalifa

Her eldest son, Isa is second in line to the throne after his father. She died on 10 June 2018.

== "Be Free" ==
As a campaigner for human rights, Hala launched the "Be Free" campaign on the 19 March 2002 to protect children from abuse.
