= Faisal bin Hamad Al Khalifa =

Bahraini Royal (1991–2006)

- Born: 12 February 1991; Riffa, Bahrain
- Died: 12 January 2006 (aged 14); Safriya, Bahrain
- Burial: Al Rifa'a Cemetery
- House: Khalifa
- Father: Hamad bin Isa Al Khalifa
- Mother: Hessa bint Faisal bin Muhammad Al Marri
- Religion: Islam

Sheikh Faisal bin Hamad Al Khalifa (Arabic: فيصل بن حمد آل خليفة; 12 February 1991 – 12 January 2006) was a member of Bahrain's ruling family, the House of Khalifa.

== Early life and activities ==
Sheikh Faisal was born at Al Sakhir Palace, East Riffa on 12 February 1991. He was the sixth of King Hamad's seven sons. Amongst his other titles, he was the honorary president of the Bahrain Disabled Sports Federation. He was among those who organized the World Junior Endurance Championship in Bahrain in December 2005.

His mother is Hessa bint Faisal bin Muhammad bin Shuraim Al Marri.

== Death ==
Sheikh Faisal died in a car crash on 12 January 2006. He was 14. The accident occurred near Safriya, 20 km south of Manama, when his car collided with a bus at high speed, veered off the road, and struck the base of an advertising sign displaying his father's picture. It was later revealed that the prince had been driving the vehicle at the time. Sheikh Faisal was buried early the next day at Al Rifa'a Cemetery.
