= Salman bin Hamad Al Khalifa =

Crown Prince and Prime Minister of the Kingdom of Bahrain

- Crown Prince of Bahrain
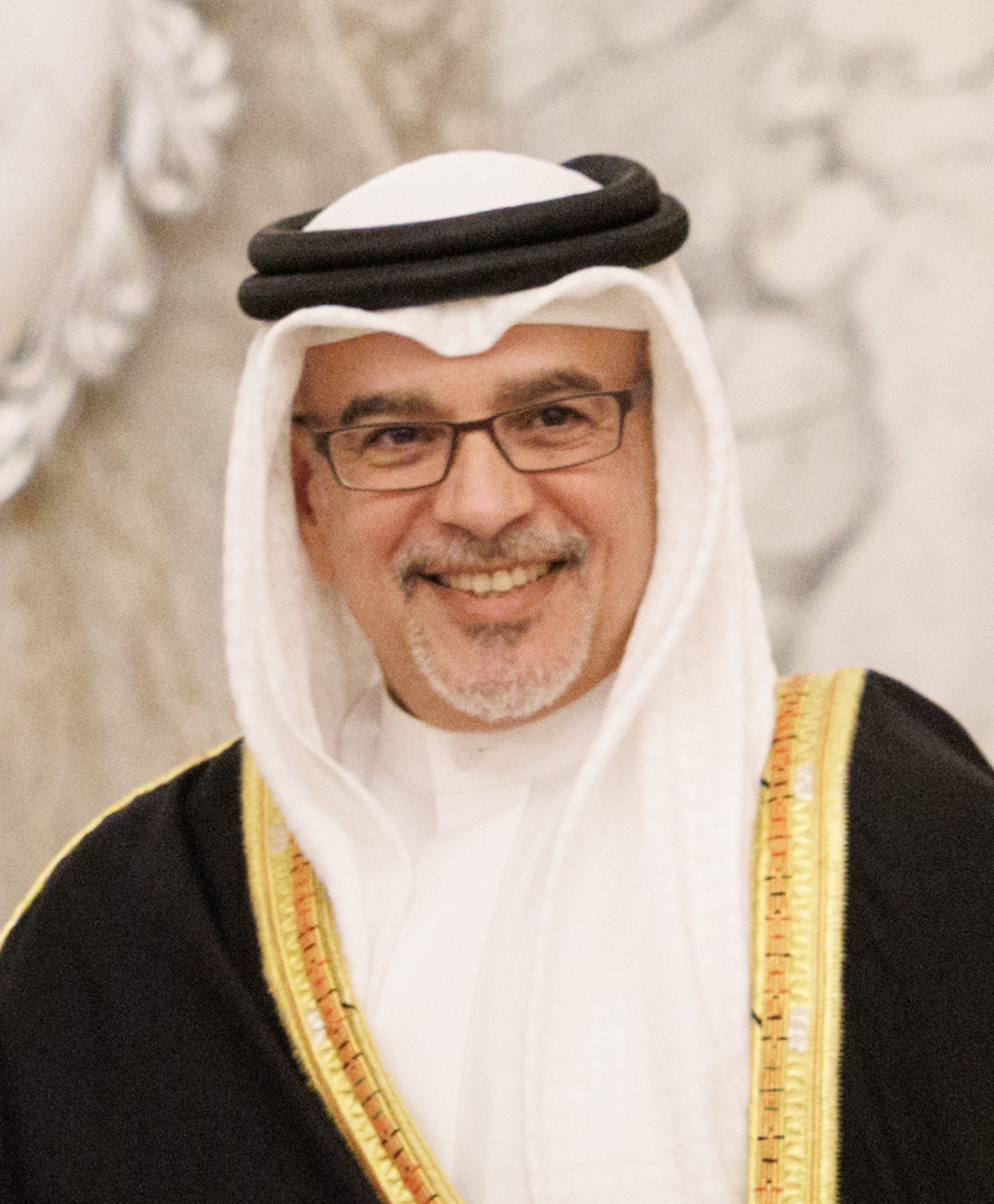
- Salman in 2026

2nd Prime Minister of Bahrain
- Incumbent
- Assumed office 11 November 2020
- Monarch: Hamad bin Isa
- Preceded by: Khalifa bin Salman Al Khalifa
- Born: 21 October 1969 (age 57); Riffa, Bahrain
- Spouse: Hala bint D'aij Al Khalifa (m. 1989; div. 2005)
- Issue: 4
- House: Khalifa
- Father: Hamad bin Isa Al Khalifa
- Mother: Sabika bint Ibrahim Al Khalifa
- Religion: Sunni Islam

Salman bin Hamad bin Isa Al Khalifa (Note: Arabic: سَلمَان بن حَمَد بن عِيْسى آل خَلِيْفَة, romanized: Salmān bin Ḥamad bin Īsā Āl Khalīfa) (born 21 October 1969) has been the Crown Prince of Bahrain since 1999, and the Prime Minister of Bahrain since 2020. He previously served as the Commander-in-Chief of the Bahrain Defence Force from 1999 to 2008.

== Early life and education ==
Salman bin Hamad bin Isa Al Khalifa was born on 21 October 1969, as the eldest son of King Hamad bin Isa Al Khalifa and Princess Sabika bint Ibrahim Al Khalifa. After Hamad became Emir of Bahrain Salman was sworn in as crown prince on 9 March 1999.

Salman was educated in Bahrain, and graduated from American University with a bachelor of arts in public administration in 1992, and the University of Cambridge with a master's degree in philosophy and history in 1994.

== Career ==
At the Bahrain Centre for Studies and Research Salman was appointed vice-chair of the board of trustees in 1992, and then served as chair from 1995 to 1999. He was appointed chair of the Bahrain Economic Development Board on 3 March 2002, and was in charge of developing Bahrain's economy. He was appointed chair of the Supreme Committee for Natural Resources and Economic Security on 15 July 2013, and worked to increase Bahrain's exploration of oil.

Salman became Commander-in-Chief of the Bahrain Defence Force on 22 March 1999, and held the position until his appointment as Deputy Supreme Commander on the Armed Forces on 6 January 2008.

During the 2011 Bahraini uprising, Salman was empowered by Hamad to lead the government's negotiations with Al-Wefaq, the main opposition group, in February 2011. Progress was made towards a plan for political reform, but it was opposed by his uncle, Prime Minister Khalifa bin Salman Al Khalifa, and by King Abdullah of Saudi Arabia. The Gulf Cooperation Council sent troops into Bahrain against uprising in March 2011, at the formal request of Hamad.

Hamad appointed Salman as First Deputy Prime Minister in March 2013. On 11 November 2020, he was appointed as Prime Minister of Bahrain, after death of Khalifa bin Salman. He attended the state funeral of Queen Elizabeth II in 2022.

== Political views ==
Salman is known as a reformist. During the 2011 uprising, he proposed and led the negotiations with the opposition, with the support of King Hamad.

== Personal life ==
Salman married Hala bint D'aij Al Khalifa, with whom he had four children before their divorce and her death on 10 June 2018. He can speak Arabic and English.

== Honours and awards ==
Styles of The Crown Prince of Bahrain
- Reference style: His Royal Highness
- Spoken style: Your Royal Highness

Salman has been awarded a number of honors, including:

- An honorary doctorate in conjunction with the Order of the Eagle Exemplar by the United States Sports Academy (USSA).
- Bahrain: Order of Sheikh Isa bin Salman Al Khalifa (Wisam al-Shaikh 'Isa bin Salman Al Khalifa), First Class
- Bahrain: Order of Ahmad the Conqueror (Wisam Ahmad al-Fateh), First Class
- Bahrain: King Hamad Order of the Renaissance, First Class
- Bahrain: Order of Bahrain (Wisam al-Bahrein), First Class
- Bahrain: Hawar Medal (Wisam al-Hawar), First Class
- Jordan: Grand Cordon of the Supreme Order of the Renaissance (Wisam al-Nahda)
- Kuwait: Order of the Liberation (Wisam al-Tahrir), First Class
- UAE: Collar of the Order of Etihad
- USA: Golden Plate Award, American Academy of Achievement

== See also ==
- List of current heirs apparent

== Works cited ==
=== News ===
- "Crown Prince's son graduates from Sandhurst". Gulf Daily News. 16 April 2011. Archived from the original on 24 April 2025.
- "Sheikha Hala, former wife of Bahrain's crown prince, dies". Associated Press. 10 June 2018. Archived from the original on 30 June 2025.
- Fatimah, Manaal (19 September 2022). "Queen Elizabeth II's Funeral: Arab Royals Pay Their Respects Ahead of The Ceremony". Harper's Bazaar. Archived from the original on 24 April 2025.
- International Crisis Group (2011). "Popular Protest in North Africa and the Middle East (VIII): Bahrain's Rocky Road to Reform". Crisis Group Middle East/North Africa Report. 111. JSTOR resrep36845.
- Norton, Augustus Richard (2015). "The Middle East's Spreading Morass". Current History. 114 (776): 355–60. doi:10.1525/curh.2015.114.776.355. JSTOR 45319776.

=== Web ===
- "About His Royal Highness". Prime Minister of Bahrain. Archived from the original on 30 June 2025.
- "Crown Prince". Embassy of the Kingdom of Bahrain to the United States. Archived from the original on 30 January 2012.
- "Princess Sabeeka Bint Ibrahim Al Khalifa". UN Women. Archived from the original on 30 June 2025.

Political offices
| Preceded by Khalifa bin Salman Al Khalifa | Prime Minister of Bahrain; 2020–present | Incumbent |
