= Al-Abbas ibn Ibrahim as-Samlali =

Moroccan historian, faqih, and judge from Marrakes

al-Qadi al-Abbas bin Ibrahim as-Samlali al-Marrakshi
- العباس بن إبراهيم السملالي المراكشي
- Writing career
- Period: 20th century

al-Abbās ibn Ibrāhīm as-Samlālī al-Marrākshī (Arabic: العباس بن إبراهيم السملالي المراكشي; 1877 – 1959) was a Moroccan historian, faqih, and judge from Marrakesh. He is notable for his book Information About the Notables of Marrakesh and Aghmat (الإعلام بمن حل مراكش وأغمات من الأعلام).

== Biography ==
He received his education at mosques and Quranic schools in Marrakesh. He began his career as an instructor at the Riad al-'Arūs Mosque. He was then promoted to the third rank of Islamic scholars in Marrakesh. After the Hafidiya, he became a secretary in the office of the Prime Minister of Marrakesh. He served Sultan Abd al-Hafid in Fes, and this period is recognized as a time of prolific writing for the historian.

After the Treaty of Fes and the inception of the French Protectorate, he returned to teaching in Marrakesh, also working in Islamic opinion and notary work. He moved to Rabat when he was appointed a judge in the court of appeals. He was then made a judge in Settat and Jadida. He was then made a judge in Marrakesh where he worked until his retirement shortly before his death in 1959.

== Works ==
=== Information About the Notables of Marrakesh and Aghmat ===
Information About the Notables of Marrakesh and Aghmat is considered an important history encyclopedia. In writing it, he relied on both printed sources and manuscripts.

=== Other works ===
Although he is noted for his history book Information About the Notables of Marrakesh and Aghmat, he also published in the fields of fiqh, hadith, and literature.
