= Bahrain Defence Force =

Combined military forces of Bahrain

- قوة دفاع البحرين
- Founded: 1968; 58 years ago
- Service branches: Royal Bahraini Army; Royal Bahraini Naval Force; Royal Bahraini Air Force; Royal Guard; Royal Medical Services
- Website: www.bdf.bh

Leadership
- Supreme Commander: Hamad bin Isa Al Khalifa
- Deputy Supreme Commander: Salman bin Hamad Al Khalifa
- Commander-in-chief: Khalifa bin Ahmed Al Khalifa
- Minister of Defence Affairs: Abdulla bin Hasan Al Nuaimi
- Chief of Staff: Theyab bin Saqer Al Noaimi

Personnel
- Active personnel: 40,400
- Reserve personnel: 110,000

Expenditure
- Budget: $1.5 billion (2023)
- Percent of GDP: 3.3% (2023)

Related articles
- Ranks: Military ranks of Bahrain

The Bahrain Defence Force (Arabic: قوة دفاع البحرين, romanized: Quwwat Difāʿ al-Baḥrayn; abbreviated BDF) is the military force of the Kingdom of Bahrain. The Bahrain Defence Force is under the direct command and leadership of a commander-in-chief who holds the rank of field marshal. The Government has a Minister of Defence Affairs, responsible for BDF representation in the Cabinet.

The BDF numbers about 40,000+ personnel and consists of the Royal Bahraini Air Force, Royal Bahraini Army, Royal Bahraini Navy and the Royal Guard. Apart from the BDF, the public security forces and the Coast Guard report to the Ministry of Interior.

In January 2008, Crown Prince Salman bin Hamad Al Khalifa, was appointed as the Deputy Supreme Commander, while Khalifa bin Ahmed Al Khalifa was appointed Commander-in-Chief of the BDF. BDF's Chief of Staff is Lieutenant General Theyab bin Saqer Al Noaimi.

== History ==
The Bahrain Defence Force was established in 1968 by Sheikh Isa bin Salman Al Khalifa for safeguarding the nation's primary interests and was initially named the National Guard. On November 1, 1969, the National Guard was renamed to the Bahrain Defence Force. The first batch of recruits started basic training on 28 October 1968 with the first recurits of the force graduating on 5 February 1969.

In 1977 Isa ibn Salman appointed his eldest son and heir apparent, Hamad ibn Isa Al Khalifa, to be minister of defense and commander in chief of the Bahrain Defense Force. Sheikh Hamad, a recent graduate of Mons Officer Cadet School in 1969, was tasked with restructuring the Bahrain Defence Force.

The Bahrain Defence Force participated in the Gulf War, war on terror, and Saudi-led intervention in Yemen.

== See also ==
- National Guard (Bahrain)
- Special Security Force Command
