= Sabika bint Ibrahim Al Khalifa =

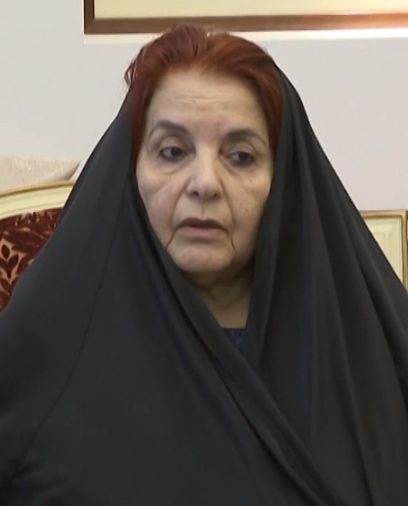
- Sabika in 2019

Princess consort of Bahrain
- Tenure: 14 February 2002 – present
- Born: 1948 (age 77–78); Muharraq, Bahrain
- Spouse: Hamad bin Isa Al Khalifa (m. 1968)
- Issue: Salman, Crown Prince of Bahrain; Sheikh Abdullah; Sheikh Khalifa; Sheikha Najla
- House: Khalifa
- Father: Ibrahim bin Muhammad Al Khalifa
- Mother: Fatima bint Salman Al Khalifa
- Religion: Sunni Islam

Sabika bint Ibrahim Al Khalifa (Arabic: سبيكة بنت إبراهيم آل خليفة; born 1948) is the first wife and consort of the king of Bahrain, Hamad bin Isa Al Khalifa. She is the mother of Crown Prince Salman bin Hamad Al Khalifa.

== Personal life ==
Sheikha Sabika was born in Muharraq, Bahrain, in 1948 in the palace of her paternal grandfather, Sheikh Mohammed bin Isa bin Ali Al Khalifa. She was born to Sheikh Ibrahim bin Muhammad Al Khalifa and Sheikha Fatima bint Salman Al Khalifa. Al Khalifa was raised in Riffa with her maternal grandfather, Salman ibn Hamad Al Khalifa, who was the Hakim of Bahrain between 1941 and 1960. She studied in Bahraini schools, and attended specialized courses in the United Kingdom and the French Republic.

Sabika married her first cousin, Hamad bin Isa Al Khalifa, on 9 October 1968. She is the first wife of Hamad. Sabika and Hamad have four children, three sons and one daughter:

- Salman bin Hamad Al Khalifa, Crown Prince of Bahrain (born 21 October 1969).
- Abdullah bin Hamad Al Khalifa (born 30 June 1975).
- Khalifa bin Hamad Al Khalifa (born 4 June 1977).
- Najla bint Hamad Al Khalifa (born 20 May 1981).

As a hobby, Sabika works with Arabian horses. She has worked to maintain breed purity and establish Bahrain as one of the first countries protecting the breed.

== Public life ==
=== Work with the Supreme Council for Women ===
In 2001, Bahrain announced that Sabika would chair the new women's council. In 2008, she became the head of the Supreme Council for Women in Bahrain, which encourages the expansion of women's rights in Bahrain. This group encouraged women to vote in the 2001 elections. In June 2005, Sabika hosted the first ladies of the Arab world in Bahrain for the second meeting of the Higher Council of Arab Women Organisation. She formulated and supervised the implementation of the National Strategy for the Advancement of Bahraini Women, the strategic document for the Supreme Council for Women.

In 2006 (shortly before the national election), Sabika led the SCW in launching a women's political empowerment program to support and train women for participation in the public sphere. This program was the first of its kind in the Arab region. She also launched a program for the economic empowerment of women.

While Bahraini women have made overall gains in political representation since its founding, the SCW has been criticized due to its connection with the state and with Sabika. The SCW has been criticized for being unwilling to challenge the status quo. It has also been accused of controlling, not supporting, women's political participation and deliberately diminishing the efforts of independent women's NGOs. In this position, Sabika is considered "a role model for women on the pro-government side."

=== Awards created ===
In 2007, Sabika launched an award supporting productive families.

Sabika established Her Royal Highness Princess Sabeeka Bint Ibrahim Al Khalifa's Award for Empowering Bahraini Women, which encourages public and private organizations and individuals to support Bahraini women. In 2016, she expanded this award to be the Princess Sabeeka Bint Ibrahim Al Khalifa Global Award for Women's Empowerment with the United Nations Women. This award allocates $100,000 to each of three category.

=== Other public work ===
Sabika is the honorary president and a supporter of charities including UCO Parents Care Center and the Bahrain Society. She is a supporter of causes and funds that encourage and support female entrepreneurship, youth empowerment, science and technology, and Bahraini cultural and artistic heritage. She is the chief patron of the Society for Women and Children in Bahrain and has addressed the United Nations General Assembly on topics such as Children – future action and Children – programme implementation.

In 2010, Sabika launched Bahrain's National Initiative for Agricultural Development. She remains the President of the Consultative Council of the National Initiative for Agricultural Development.

== Honours ==
- China Women's College: Honorary Doctorate in Social Sciences, in honor of her role in women-oriented fields of work and society (2002)
- Bahrain: Order of Ahmad the Victorious, First Class (2 November 2003).
- Bahrain: Order of Sheikh Isa bin Salman Al Khalifa (Wisam al-Shaikh ‘Isa bin Salman Al Khalifa), First Class (16 December 2008).
- Arab Towns Organization Award (2009)
- League of Arab States: Arab Woman Distinction (2017)

== Bibliography ==
- Index to the proceedings of the General Assembly: Twenty-seventh special session, New York: United Nations Publications, 2003, ISBN 978-92-1-100917-0
- Al Abed, Ibrahim; Vine, Paula; Hellyer, Peter; et al., eds. (2006), United Arab Emirates yearbook (2006 ed.), London: Trident Press, ISBN 978-1-905486-05-2
- East, Roger; Thompson, Richard, eds. (2003), Profiles of people in power: the world's government leaders, London: Europa Publications Limited, ISBN 1-85743-126-X
- Pegues, Beverley J. (2007), The persecuted church prayer devotional: interceding for the suffering church, Colorado Springs: Authentic Publishing, ISBN 978-1-932805-90-1
- Sleeman, Elizabeth, ed. (2003), The international who's who (2004 ed.), London: Europa Publications Limited, ISBN 978-1-85743-217-6
- Winkler, David Frank (2007), Amirs, admirals and desert sailors: Bahrain, the U.S. Navy and the Arabian Gulf, Annapolis: Naval Institute Press, ISBN 978-1-59114-962-0
