= Abdullah bin Hamad bin Isa Al Khalifa =

Bahraini royal (born 1975)

- Born: 30 June 1975 (age 51); Riffa, Bahrain
- Spouse: Sheikha Hessa bint Khalifa Al Khalifa
- Issue Issue: Sheikh Isa; Sheikh Salman; Sheikha Noora; Sheikha Hessa
- House: Khalifa
- Father: Hamad bin Isa Al Khalifa
- Mother: Sabika bint Ibrahim Al Khalifa

Abdullah bin Hamad bin Isa Al Khalifa (Arabic: عبد الله بن حمد آل خليفة; born 30 June 1975) is the second son of the present King of Bahrain, Hamad bin Isa Al Khalifah, and his first wife, Sabika bint Ibrahim Al Khalifa.

Like all members of the royal family, Abdullah sits as a senior member of the civil judiciary.

In addition to his government positions, Abdullah is chairman of the Bahrain Motor Federation and the Commission Internationale de Karting. He is the eighth in-line to succeed his father as ruler of the Kingdom of Bahrain. His son, Sheikh Isa bin Abdullah bin Hamad Al Khalifa, is a successful racecar driver and co-owner of a GT3 team, 2 Seas Motorsport.

== Friendship with Michael Jackson ==
A long-time fan and personal friend of American pop legend Michael Jackson, Abdullah had loaned Jackson $2.2 million to assist in the singer's legal fees after he was tried for child molestation in California (2005); after a successful defense, and the subsequent dismissal of all charges, Abdullah invited Jackson (with his children and personal entourage) to vacation in Bahrain. Jackson took him up on the invitation on 30 June 2005.

Following the 2005 tragedy of Hurricane Katrina, and wanting to help revive Jackson's music career, Sheikh Abdullah suggested that Jackson record a song (which Abdullah had written lyrics for) as a Katrina charity single, entitled "I Have This Dream". Jackson attended recording sessions for the track in London; however, the single was never officially released through the Sheikh's co-owned record label, 2 Seas Group. Jackson then left Bahrain in May 2006 for Ireland.

In November 2008, after trying to recover from Jackson £4.7 million in fees that the singer had said were "gifts", Abdullah sued him through the mutually agreed High Court in London. Abdullah claimed that, despite having paid the $2.2 million (£1.5 million) cost for Jackson to record a song intended to benefit the victims of Hurricane Katrina, the singer failed to show at the studio for the final recording session, and thus song was never released. Bankim Thanki QC (representing Abdullah) told the High Court that, the day after Jackson's criminal trial ended in California, he recorded a song which Abdullah had wanted released as a charity single to help the victims of the Indian Ocean tsunami, and that Abdullah felt "a strong sense of personal betrayal" after forming "a close personal relationship" with the singer.

== Marriage and children ==
Abdullah is married to Hessa bint Khalifa Al Khalifa, who, from 2002 to 2004, was a member of the Supreme Council for Women, and has been a permanent member of the Board since 2004. Since 2006, she has been the executive director of Injaz Bahrain, a member of the Suzanne Mubarak Women's International Peace Movement, and a member of the Young Arab Leaders of Bahrain.

Together, Abdullah and Hessa have four children, two sons and two daughters:

- Shaikh Isa bin Abdullah bin Hamad Al Khalifa (born 1999) is a professional racecar driver and owner of the racing team 2 Seas Motorsport, and ninth in the line of succession to the Bahraini throne.
- Shaikha Noora bint Abdullah bin Hamad Al Khalifa (born 2002).
- Shaikh Salman bin Abdullah bin Hamad Al Khalifa (born 2008) is tenth in the line of succession to the throne.
- Shaikha Hessa bint Abdullah bin Hamad Al Khalifa (born 2010).
