= National Guard (Bahrain) =

- الحرس الوطني
- National Guard Insignia
- Founded: 1997
- Country: Bahrain
- Allegiance: Bahrain
- Branch: Army
- Type: Land Force
- Role: Land warfare
- Size: 3,000
- Part of: King of Bahrain
- Garrison/HQ: Al-Sakhir, Bahrain
- Anniversaries: 7 January
- Engagements: Bahraini uprising of 2011

Commanders
- Current commander: General Mohammed bin Isa Al Khalifa

Insignia
- National Guard flag

The National Guard of Bahrain (Arabic: الحرس الوطني) is separate military force from the Bahrain Defence Force. The National Guard is charged with internal security and assisting the Bahrain Defence Force in defending against external threats. It was established in 1997, through a royal decree by then Emir Isa bin Salman Al Khalifa.

The National Guard is commanded by General Mohammed bin Isa Al Khalifa, brother of King Hamad bin Isa Al Khalifa. It consists of about 3,000 personnel.

The National Guard was involved in the government's response to the 2011 Bahraini uprising. State media described the operation as having been carried out "with high standards of competence and professionalism".
