= Order of Sheikh Isa bin Salman Al Khalifa =

Bahraini order of merit

Order of Sheikh Isa bin Salman Al Khalifa (Wisam al-Shaikh ‘Isa bin Salman Al Khalifa)
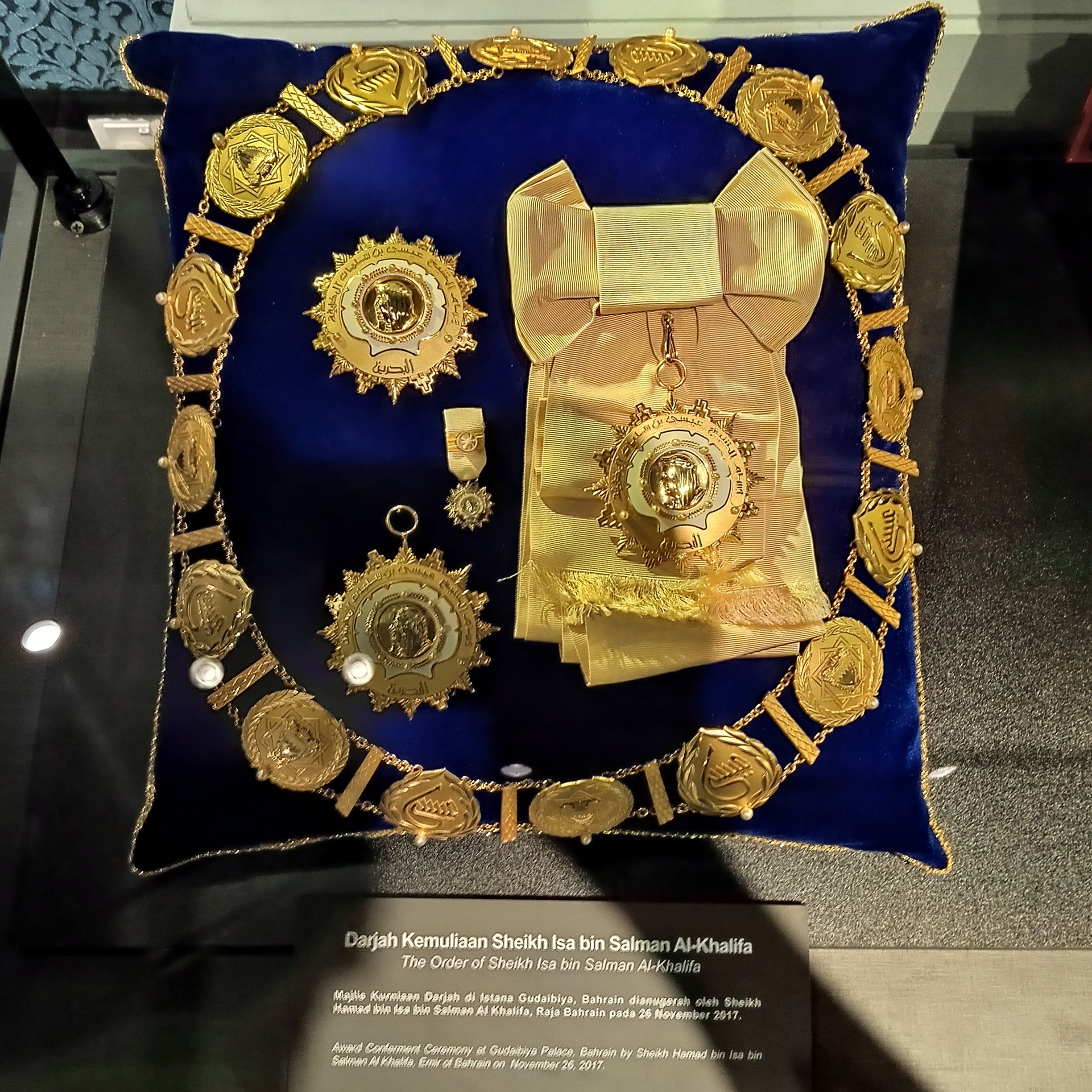
- The Order of Sheikh Isa bin Salman Al-Khalifa awarded to Ibrahim Iskandar of Johor

Awarded by Bahrain
- Type: Order
- Established: 6 October 1999
- Status: Currently constituted
- Grades: Collar

Precedence
- Next (lower): Order of Al Khalifa
- Ribbon bar of the order

The Order of Sheikh Isa bin Salman Al Khalifa (Arabic: وسام الشيخ عيسى بن سلمان آل خليفة) is a Bahraini order of merit. It is the highest decoration in the Kingdom of Bahrain and is named after Isa bin Salman Al Khalifa, the former Emir of Bahrain.

== History ==
The award was established by King Hamad bin Isa Al Khalifa on October 6, 1999.

== Grades ==
The award has five degrees: premium class, first class, second class, third class, and fourth class. They are awarded in descending order through the following levels:

1. Heads of state and government, crown princes, senior members of the House of Khalifa, ministers in the Cabinet of Bahrain, and civilians and military personnel of equivalent status.
2. Undersecretaries and assistant undersecretaries of ministries, members of legislative and advisory bodies, and soldiers, civil servants, and businesspeople of equivalent status.
3. Military officers and those of similar status who have served the nation.

== Notable recipients ==
- King Salman of Saudi Arabia
- King Abdullah of Saudi Arabia
- Crown Prince of Saudi Arabia and Saudi Minister of Defense Mohammed bin Salman
- President Abdel Fattah el-Sisi of Egypt
- Former President Beji Caid Essebsi of Tunisia
- Vice-President of the United Arab Emirates and Emir of Dubai Mohammed bin Rashid Al Maktoum
- Emir Tamim bin Hamad Al Thani of Qatar
- Muhammad V of Kelantan
- President Recep Tayyip Erdoğan of Turkey
- President Jair Bolsonaro of Brazil
- Sultan Haitham bin Tariq of Oman
- Emir Mishal Al-Ahmad Al-Jaber Al-Sabah of Kuwait
- Ibrahim Iskandar of Johor
- Emmanuel Macron
