= Hamad bin Isa Al Khalifa =

Emir/King of Bahrain since 1999

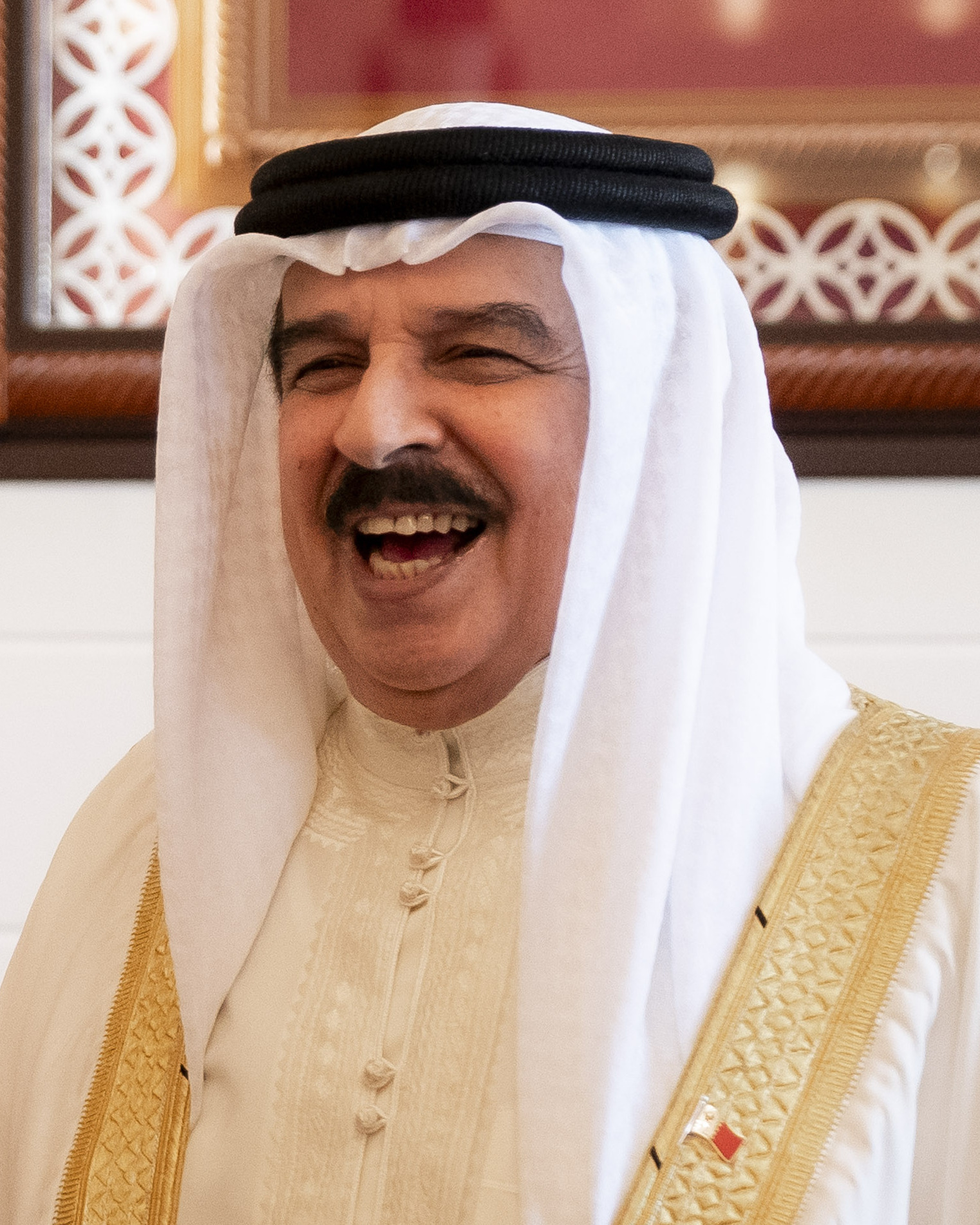
- Hamad in 2025

King of Bahrain
- Reign: 14 February 2002 – present
- Predecessor: Position established Himself (as Emir)
- Heir apparent: Salman bin Hamad Al Khalifa
- Prime Minister: Khalifa bin Salman Al Khalifa; Salman bin Hamad Al Khalifa

Emir of Bahrain
- Reign: 6 March 1999 – 14 February 2002
- Predecessor: Isa bin Salman Al Khalifa
- Successor: Position abolished Himself (as King)
- Prime Minister: Khalifa bin Salman Al Khalifa
- Born: 28 January 1950 (age 76); Riffa, Bahrain, British Empire (Note: Bahrain was under the Persian Gulf Residency as a British protectorate state at the time of Hamad's birth.)
- Spouse: Sabika bint Ibrahim (m. 1968): Sheia bint Hassan bin Khraish Alajmi; Hessa bint Faisal bin Shraim Almerri; Manal bint Jabor Aljbor Alnuaimi
- Issue Detail: List: Salman bin Hamad Al Khalifa; Abdullah bin Hamad Al Khalifa; Khalifa bin Hamad Al Khalifa; Najla bint Hamad Al Khalifa; Nasser bin Hamad Al Khalifa; Khalid bin Hamad Al Khalifa; Faisal bin Hamad Al Khalifa; Sultan bin Hamad Al Khalifa; Hessa bint Hamad Al Khalifa; Noura bint Hamad Al Khalifa; Munira bint Hamad Al Khalifa; Rima bint Hamad Al Khalifa
- Arabic: حمد بن عيسى آل خليفة
- House: Khalifa
- Father: Isa bin Salman Al Khalifa
- Mother: Hessa bint Salman Al Khalifa
- Religion: Sunni Islam
- Military career
- Education: Mons Officer Cadet School; U.S. Army Command and General Staff College
- Allegiance: Bahrain
- Branch: Bahrain Defence Force
- Service years: 1968–
- Rank: General
- Commands: Commander-in-Chief of the Bahrain Defence Force; Bahrain National Guard

Hamad bin Isa bin Salman Al Khalifa (Arabic: حمد بن عيسى بن سلمان آل خليفة; born 28 January 1950) is King of Bahrain, having reigned since 2002, and was previously Emir of Bahrain since 1999.

Hamad received his early education in Bahrain and in the United Kingdom before attending the Mons Officer Cadet School in Aldershot, Hampshire, from which he graduated in 1968. He also became a graduate of the United States Army Command and General Staff College in 1973. After his return to Bahrain, Hamad served as the commander of the Bahrain National Guard, commander-in-chief of the Bahrain Defence Force (BDF), and minister of state for defense. He established the air force as an independent branch of the BDF. He succeeded his father, Isa bin Salman Al Khalifa, as emir in 1999 and became the first king of Bahrain when he declared the country a kingdom in 2002.

Hamad's reign has been marked by transformative political, constitutional, and economic reforms. Shortly after succeeding his father in 1999, he released political prisoners and proposed a reform package, the National Action Charter, which led to a new constitution in 2002. The constitution officially changed Bahrain from an emirate to a constitutional monarchy. A legislative election was held for the first time in decades. His reign has also seen efforts to diversify the economy and expand Bahrain's role as a regional financial centre. However, it has been accompanied by political tensions and periods of unrest, most notably during the 2011 Bahraini uprising and its aftermath.

Bahrain under Hamad is considered a semi-constitutional monarchy in which the state is dominated by the House of Al Khalifa and security forces commit human rights violations. He presided over the response to the 2011 protests, including by declaring martial law and allowing the deployment of Saudi and Emirati troops. In foreign policy, he sought close alliances with the United States, the United Kingdom, and Saudi Arabia. Hamad supported the US-led invasion of Iraq in 2003 and contributed forces for the Saudi-led intervention in Yemen in 2015. In 2020, he negotiated a normalization agreement with Israel as part of the Abraham Accords, and in 2026 he joined the US-led Board of Peace.

== Early life and education ==
Hamad bin Isa Al Khalifa was born on 28 January 1950 in Riffa, Bahrain. His parents were Isa bin Salman Al Khalifa, then Crown Prince, and Hessa bint Salman Al Khalifa.

After attending Manama secondary school in Bahrain, Hamad was sent to England to attend Applegarth College in Godalming, Surrey before enrolling at The Leys School in Cambridge. Hamad then underwent military training, first with the British Army at Mons Officer Cadet School at Aldershot in Hampshire, graduating in September 1968. Four years later, in June 1972, Hamad attended the United States Army Command and General Staff College at Fort Leavenworth in Kansas, graduating the following June with a degree in leadership.

== Crown prince ==
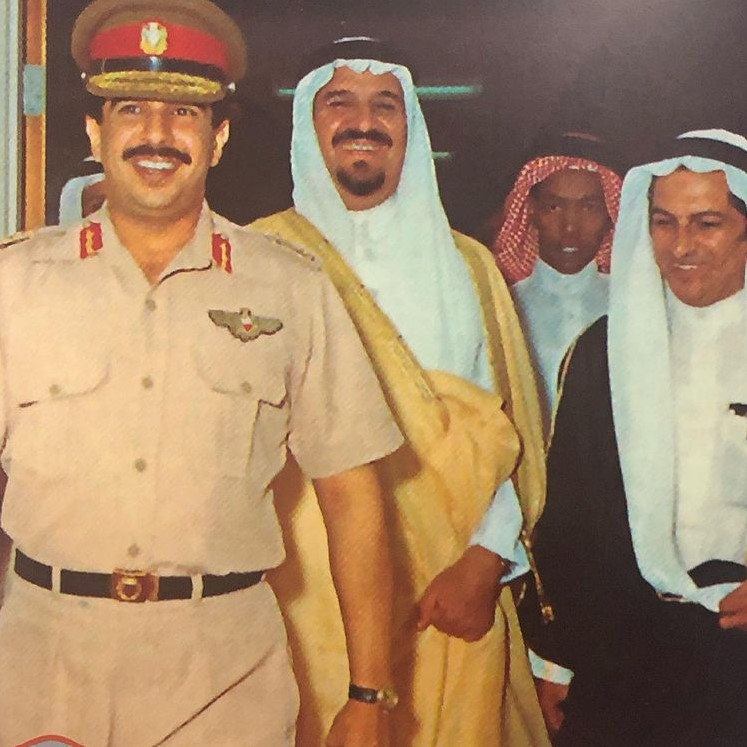
Hamad in military uniform in the 1980s

Hamad was designated as heir apparent by his father on 27 June 1964. In 1968, he was appointed as the chairman of the irrigation council and Manama municipal council. He was commissioned into the Bahrain National Guard on 16 February 1968 and appointed as its commander the same year, remaining in that post until 1969 when he was appointed as the commander-in-chief of the Bahrain Defence Force (the renamed former National Guard). In 1970, Hamad became the head of the Bahraini department of defence and the vice-chairman of the administrative council, remaining in both offices until 1971. From 1971 to 1988 he was the minister of state for defence. Hamad presided over the expansion of Bahrain's military. In October 1977, Hamad started learning to fly helicopters, successfully completing the training in January 1978. He then worked to establish the Bahrain Amiri Air Force, which came into being at the height of the Tanker War in 1987 when the defence force air wing was reconstituted as an air force.

Hamad's tenure as commander-in-chief coincided with the 1990s uprising in Bahrain, when Shia Muslim-led opposition forces under Abdul Amir al-Jamri demanded that the Sunni Muslim monarchy restored the suspended national legislature. Hamad was one of the negotiators with the opposition on the government side. The military did not become involved in the clashes between pro-democracy protestors and the government from December 1994 to April 1995, but in January 1996, Hamad issued a statement of support for the government. This was interpreted as Hamad backing the government of his uncle, Prime Minister Khalifa bin Salman Al Khalifa, with whom he was known to have had disagreements in the past. During a police crackdown in response to violent riots, the Bahrain Defence Force announced that it was willing to stop the rioting on the basis of martial law.

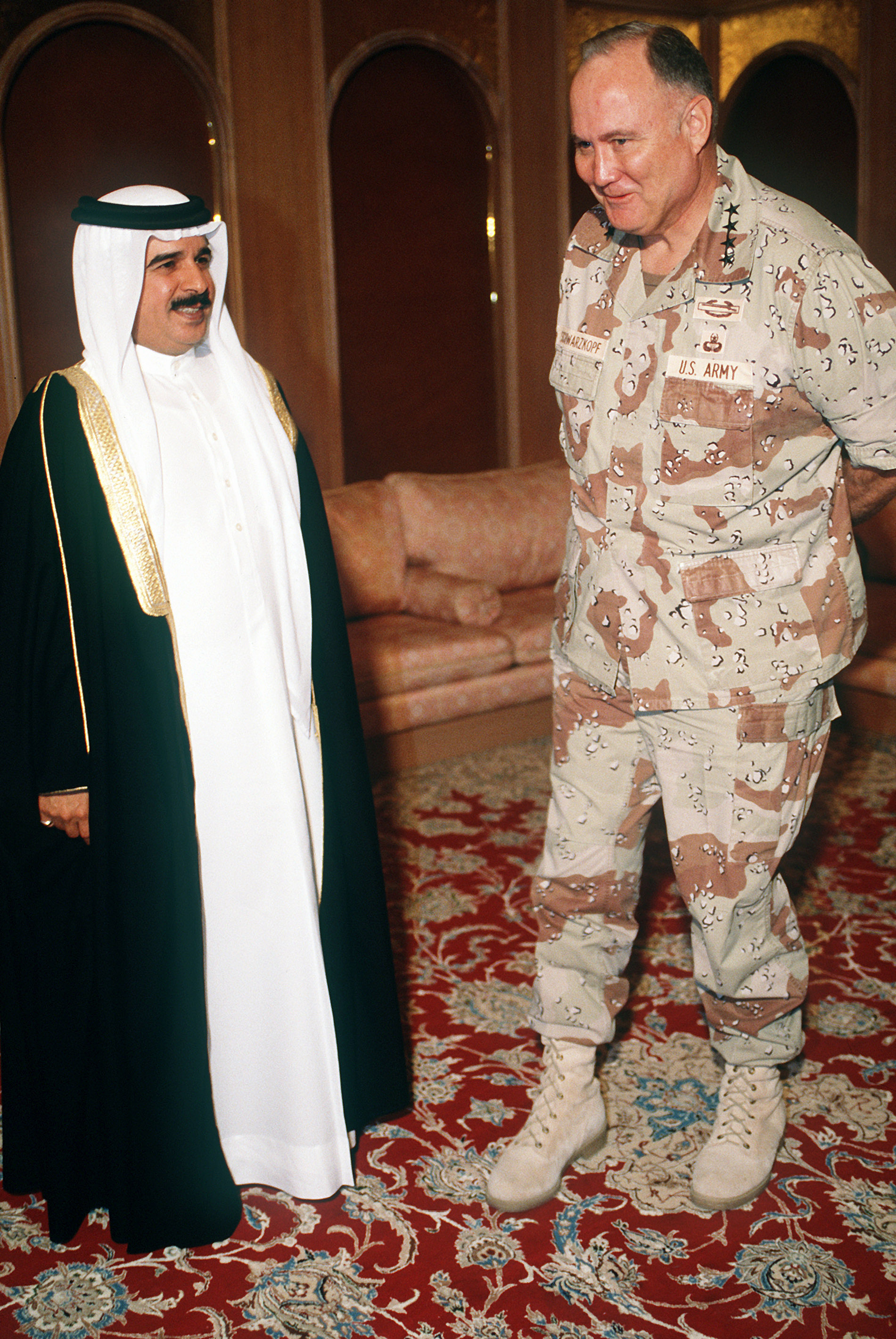
Hamad with Gen. Norman Schwarzkopf during the Gulf War

In March 1996, Crown Prince Hamad condemned a wave of Hamas terrorist attacks against Israel, and made Bahrain the first Gulf country to participate in a United States-led counterterrorism summit. The summit, hosted by Egypt's Hosni Mubarak, involved the leaders of several Arab states, the US, Israel, and Russia, and was intended as a show of support for Israel against Hamas. Hamad met US Secretary of State Warren Christopher on 8 March 1996 to discuss counter-terrorism and regional security prior to the "Summit of the Peacemakers" in Egypt.

Amidst Bahrain's territorial dispute with Qatar, its boycott of a GCC summit in Doha, and the two countries accusing each other of espionage, in December 1996 Qatari foreign minister Hamad bin Jassim bin Hamad Al Thani accused Crown Prince Hamad of spending "so much time making statements against us that he could not possibly have had time to work for the development of his country." Bahrain was also accused of supporting the reigning Qatari emir's deposed father after the 1995 coup d'état in Qatar. An Al Jazeera documentary in 2018 interviewed a Qatari dissident who claimed that Hamad personally financed sabotage operations against the then-new emir of Qatar, Hamad bin Khalifa Al Thani, including a coup attempt in February 1996 and an attempted bombing of a government building in Doha in October 1996. Previously, Hamad called on Qatar to end its case against Bahrain at the International Court of Justice over the Bahraini-administered Hawar Islands, and to accept Saudi mediation for the territorial dispute. Hamad met Qatar's foreign minister in London on 14 February 1997 and reached an agreement for the two countries to end their public feud, after mediation by the other GCC states.

== Reign ==
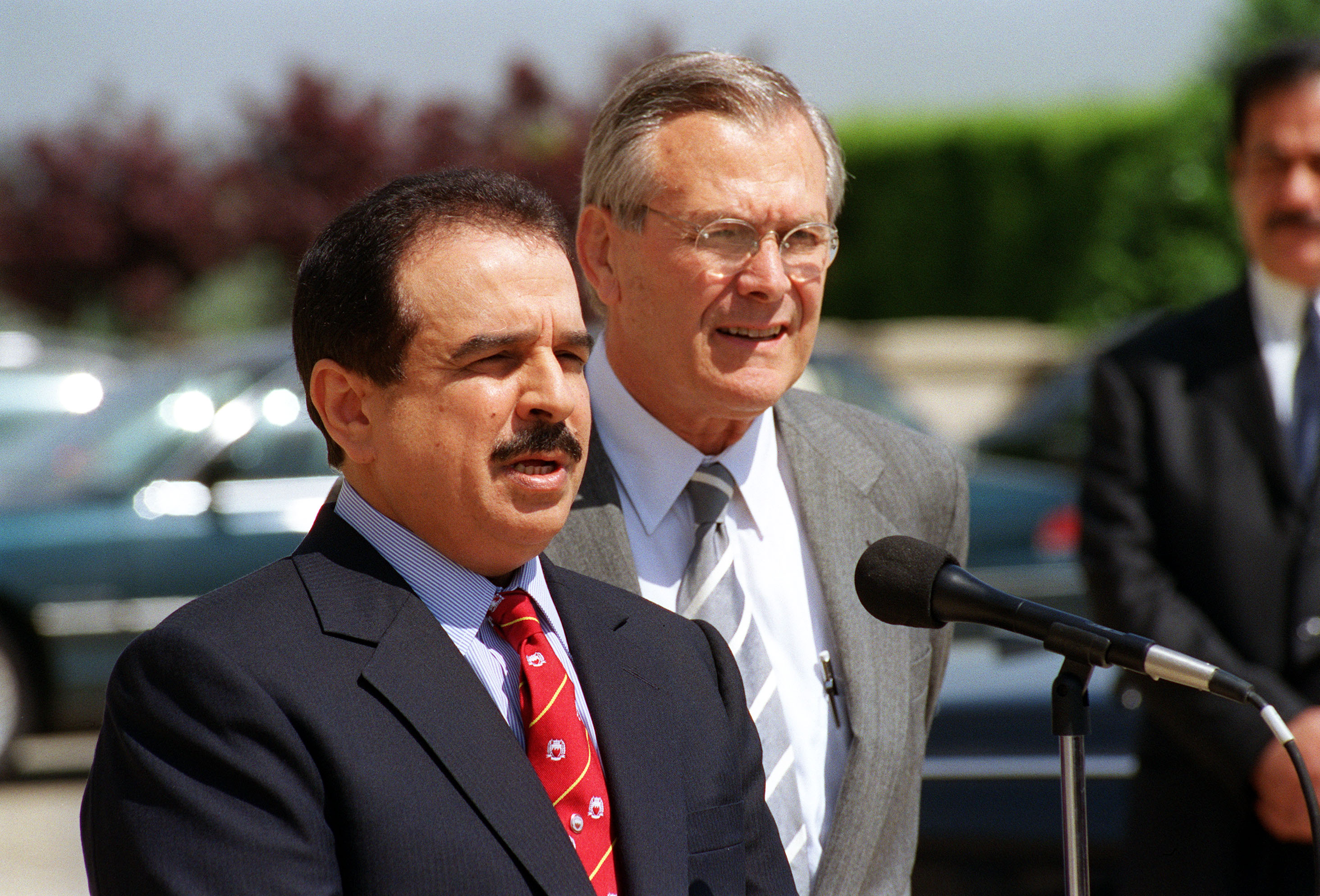
Hamad in 2001 with Donald Rumsfeld

On the death of his father Isa, Hamad became Emir of Bahrain on 6 March 1999. Hamad is the second monarch of Bahrain since its independence in 1971, and the 14th monarch of the Al Khalifa dynasty. On 14 February 2002, he declared himself King of Bahrain when the country officially became a constitutional monarchy on the basis of its new constitution. He enjoys wide executive authorities which include appointing the prime minister and his ministers, commanding the army, chairing the Higher Judicial Council, appointing the parliament's upper half and dissolving its elected lower half. Bahrain under Hamad is a semi-constitutional monarchy in which the Al Khalifa dynasty dominates the political system.

=== Political turmoil and reform ===
Hamad's government initially continued continued repressive measures against the Shia-led opposition movement, including summary arrests, torture, and deportation of activists. His uncle Khalifa bin Salman Al Khalifa remained as prime minister, who was in favor of authoritarian measures, and had effectively controlled the country since 1971, while Hamad's father had been in a largely ceremonial role as emir. Khalifa continued to wield extensive authority, especially over the security services, and reportedly undermined Hamad's attempts at reform. Hamad focused on attaining stability in a nation riddled with profound tensions after the 1990s uprising, and sought to transform Bahrain from an emirate into a constitutional monarchy, in which the Al Khalifa dynasty's power would be balanced with an elected parliament. After Khalifa died in office in 2020, Hamad focused on consolidating power around his direct descendants, and accelerating economic and political reforms, including by bringing younger leaders into the political system. Hamad appointed his eldest son and crown prince, the pro-reform Salman bin Hamad Al Khalifa, as prime minister. He appointed another son, Nasser bin Hamad Al Khalifa, as national security advisor.

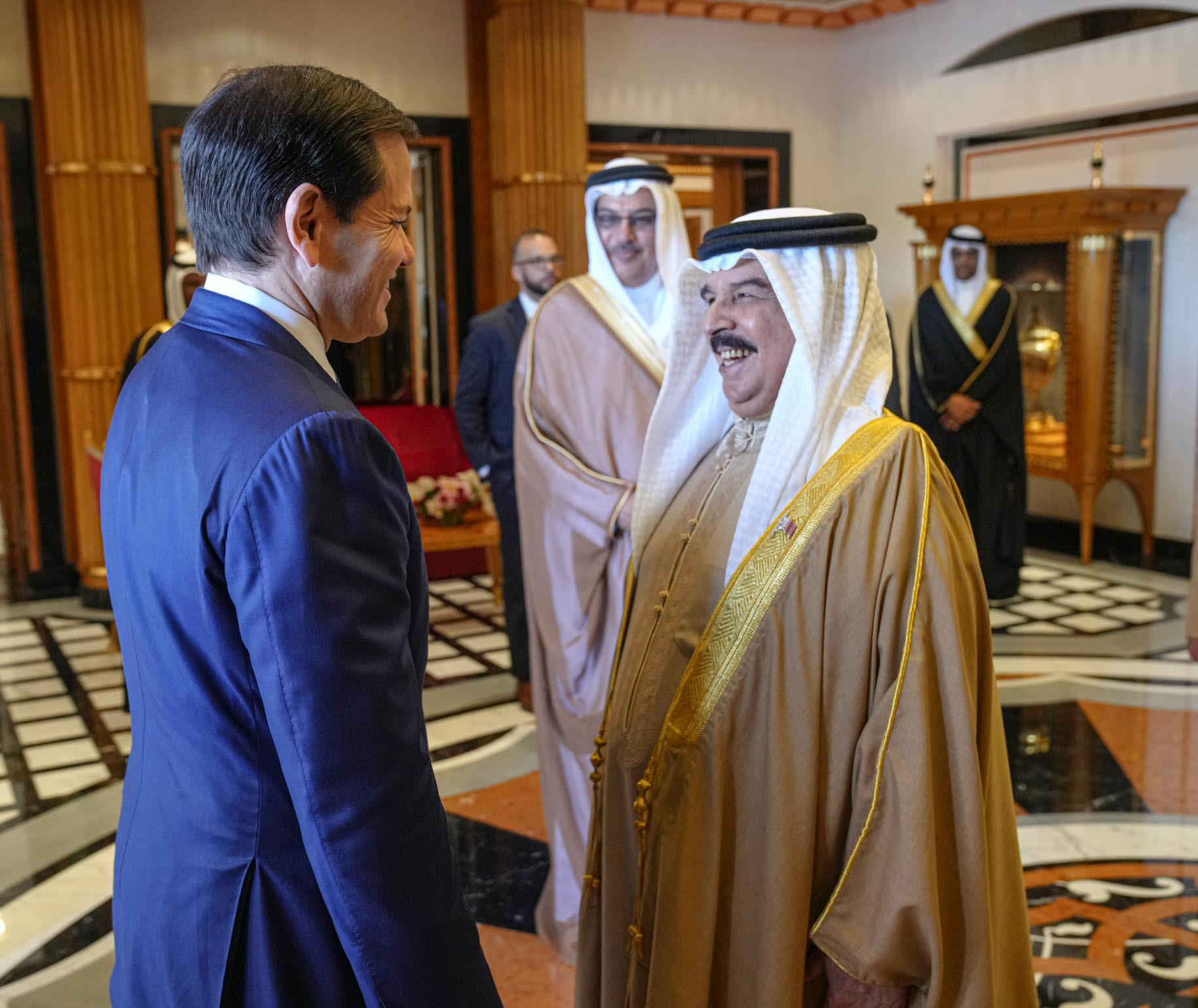
Hamad in 2026 with Marco Rubio

Hamad's reforms are credited with bringing political and economic transformation to Bahrain. These included the release of all political prisoners, the dissolution of the State Security Court and the abolition of the 1974 Decree on State Security Measures. Additionally, many Bahraini citizens were permitted to return after several years in exile overseas. The National Action Charter, Hamad's reform program, was submitted to a referendum in February 2001 and met with widespread public support. However, when a new constitution was promulgated by Hamad on 14 February 2002 (which also transformed the emirate into a kingdom), it limited the powers of the elected lower chamber in favor of the un-elected upper chamber, allowing the king to nullify the power of the elected officials. The government also influenced the 2002 general election by granting Bahraini citizenship to Sunni Muslim workers from other countries, which was seen by Shias as an attempt to reduce their demographic dominance. These measures were criticized by the opposition, which considered the constitution that Hamad unilaterally promulgated as creating a system in which the king and his advisors were unaccountable.

Hamad implemented incremental reforms as a response to protests. The monarchy being Sunni while the majority of Bahrainis are Shia has created fears of Iranian influence, which has historically claimed Bahrain, where the Arab Al Khalifa family took power from Persians. Shia Muslims, who have been repressed by Bahrain's Sunni-led government since the Iranian Revolution in 1979, were permitted to work in the ministries of defense and interior. Although Hamad's reign has seen the admittance of Shias into positions in the government, there have still been calls for a more equitable distribution of positions and jobs. The Al Khalifa family lead a large number of ministerial and governmental posts including the Ministry of the Interior, Ministry of Justice, the Ministry of Finance, the Ministry of Culture, the Ministry of Foreign Affairs, the Bahrain Economic Development Board and the Supreme Council for Women. The vast majority of significant positions in the Bahrain Defence Force are held by Sunnis, and the government continues its systemic discrimination against Shias.

Elections are not considered to be free or fair by international observers. Al-Wefaq, a Bahraini Shia political movement that wanted a true constitutional monarchy in which the prime minister is accountable to an elected parliament, boycotted the elections in 2002, but won nearly half of the seats in 2006 and 2010. In the years after the 2011 uprising, the government responded aggressively to continued protests, such as by banning al-Wefaq in 2016, and by raiding opposition groups that it claimed were being armed by Iran. On 21 May 2017, US President Donald Trump told Hamad "Our countries have a wonderful relationship together...[T]here has been a little strain, but there won't be strain with this administration." Two days later, the government arrested at least 286 people who were supporters of a Bahraini Shia leader that had been prosecuted. In 2018, Hamad signed an amendment to the Exercise of Political Rights Law that put more limitations on eligibility to run for office.

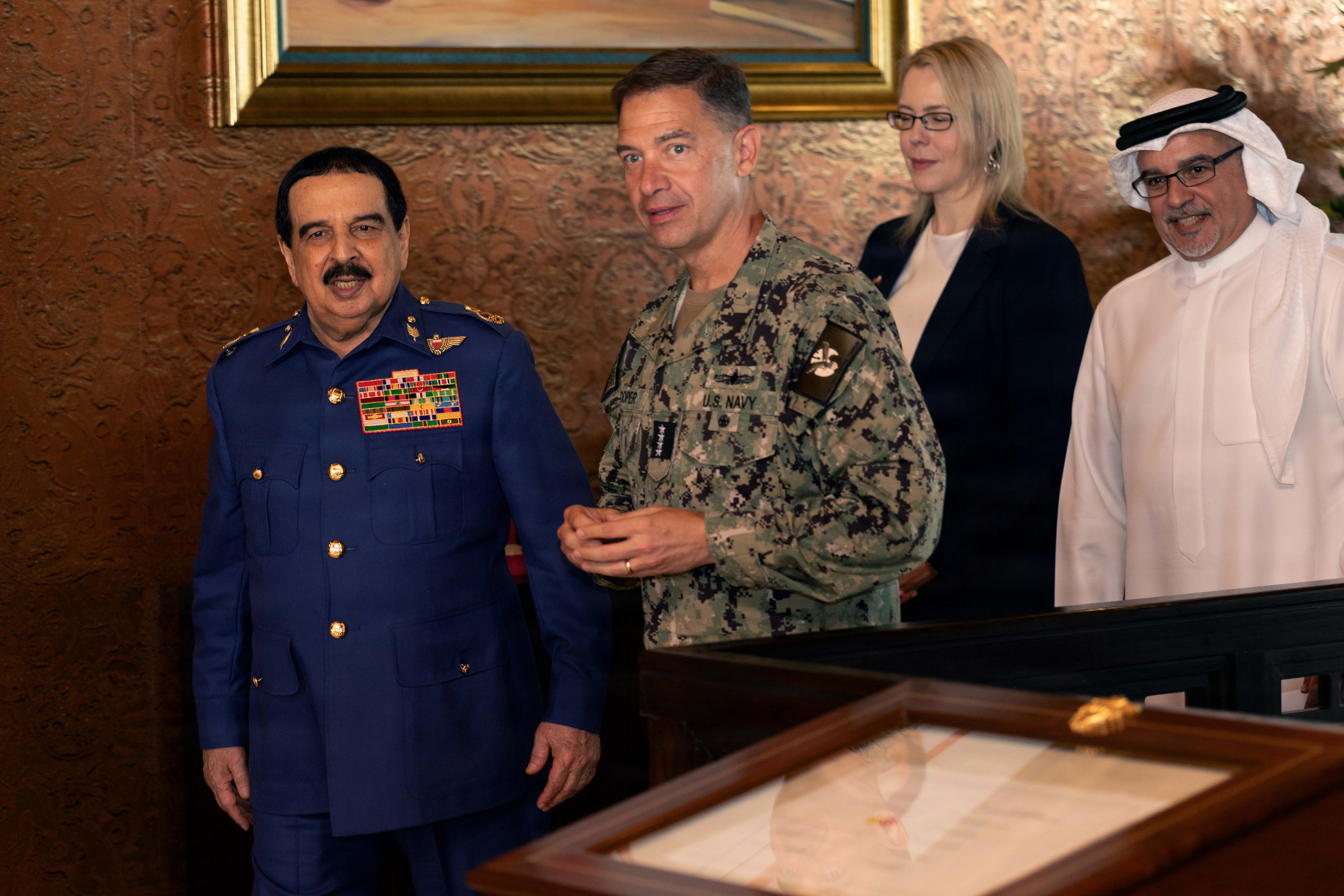
Hamad, Brad Cooper, Stephanie Hallett, and Crown Prince Salman during the war with Iran

In a series of four mass pardons in April, June, September, and December 2024, Hamad released 3,482 prisoners, including more than 800 people that were deemed political prisoners by the human rights advocates.

During the war against Iran launched by the US and Israel in 2026, Hamad made public appearances and speeches, including visits to Bahraini troops and to victims of the Iranian strikes on Bahrain. He gave a speech on 8 March 2026 condemning Iran's attacks, and visited the Royal Bahraini Air Force on 9 March in military uniform, as the supreme commander. During March, the government arrested demonstrators protesting against the US–Israeli war and mourning Iranian Supreme Leader Ali Khamenei. In April, after Hamad said the government would take measures against anyone who "betrayed the state," 69 foreign-born people had their Bahraini citizenship revoked, for showing support for Iran or espionage. Hamad said in May that "a small group of individuals chose to collaborate with the enemy and cooperated with those who violated national sovereignty," calling it "a grave act of treason," and also said that Iran must stop interfering in Bahrain's internal affairs.

==== 2011 Bahraini uprising ====
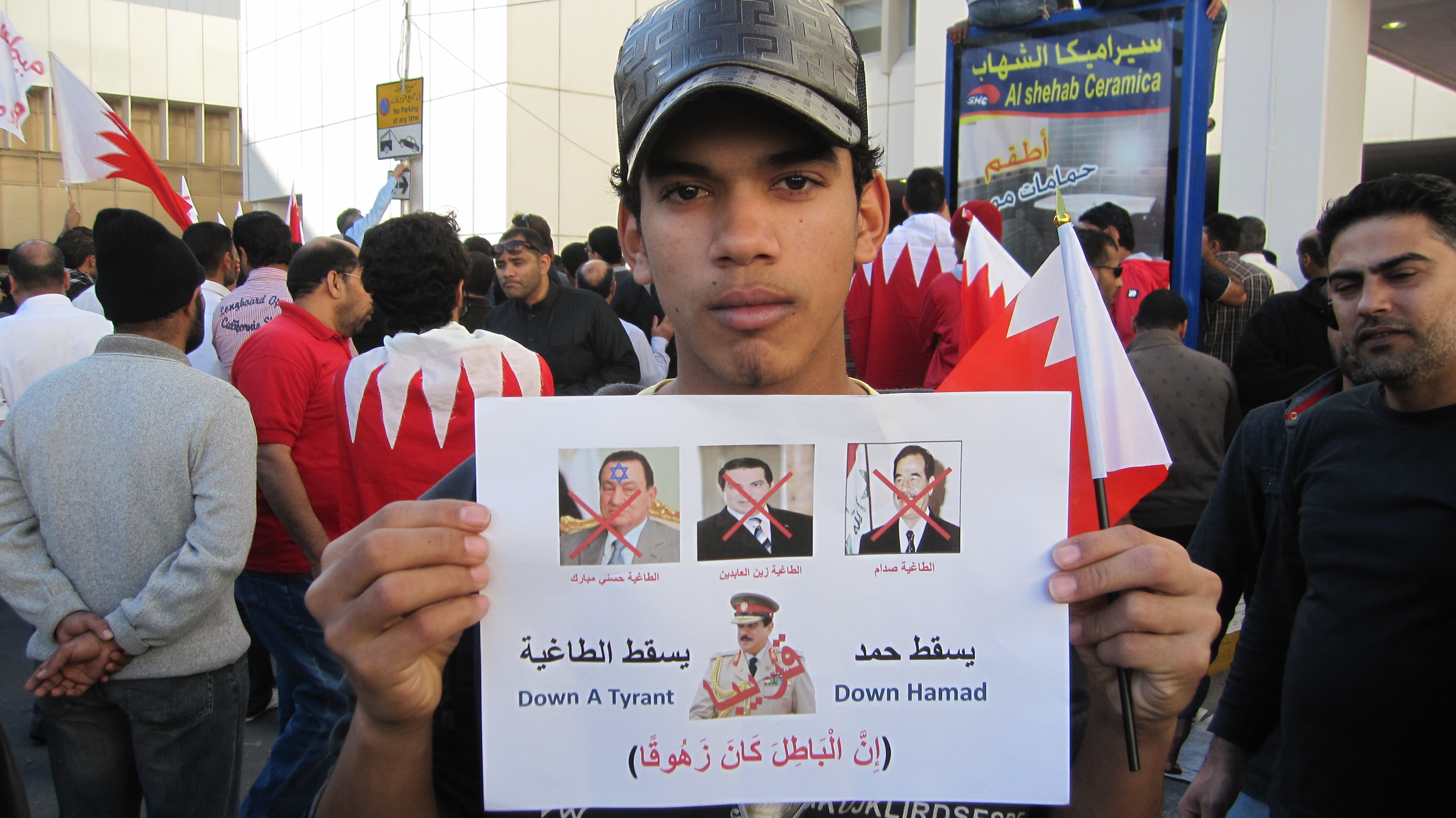
A demonstrator holding a poster that compares Hamad to Egypt's Hosni Mubarak, Iraq's Saddam Hussein, and Tunisia's Zine El Abidine Ben Ali, in 2011

On 11 February 2011, Hamad ordered that 1,000 Bahraini Dinars (approximately US$2,667) be given to "each family" to celebrate the tenth anniversary of the National Action Charter referendum. Agence France-Presse linked the BD1,000 payments to 14 February 2011 demonstration plans. On 14 February, the ninth anniversary of the writing of the Constitution of 2002, Bahrain was rocked by protests inspired by the Arab Spring and co-ordinated by a Facebook page named "Day of Rage in Bahrain", a page that was liked by tens of thousands just one week after its creation. Earlier, on 12 February, Hamad met Ali Salman, the leader of the main opposition group Al-Wefaq. Hamad was concerned over the calls for protests online, and Salman tried to negotiate with the king for the replacement of the hardline prime minister, Khalifa bin Salman, with an elected one from outside the royal family. Hamad told him that the other GCC states criticized him for his past reforms, and that they would not accept the prime minister's removal.

The Bahraini government responded with what has been described as a "brutal" crackdown on the protests, including violations of human rights that caused anger. Later on, demonstrators demanded that Hamad step down. As a result of this "massive" crackdown, Foreign Policy classified him as ranking 3rd out of 8 of "America's Unsavory Allies" calling him "one of the bad guys the U.S. still supports". On 15 February 2011, Hamad apologized for the deaths of two demonstrators in a rare TV speech and urged an investigation into the incident. Two days later, four protesters were killed and hundreds wounded when protesters were attacked in Pearl Roundabout at 03:00 am local time. The Pearl Roundabout was evacuated and encircled by the Bahraini army. Two days later, Crown Prince Salman ordered the withdrawal of army troops from there after the death of another protester caused by live ammunition next to Pearl roundabout. As protests intensified toward the end of the month, Hamad was forced to offer concessions in the form of the release of political prisoners and the dismissal of three government ministers.

Hamad had empowered his son, Crown Prince Salman, to negotiate with the opposition, despite pressure from the prime minister and other GCC countries for a crackdown. Following extensive negotiations, on 13 March, al-Wefaq rejected the crown prince's offer to have a public discussion about most of their demands and to put any agreement to a national referendum, because it was pressured by more radical protestors who wanted upfront concessions. On 14 March, Hamad formally requested a GCC military intervention and declared a State of National Safety for three months. Saudi Arabia deployed about 1,000 troops with armoured support, and the United Arab Emirates deployed about 500 troops. Opposition parties reacted strongly, calling it an "occupation". Hamad, however, claimed that he deployed the troops to "protect infrastructure and to secure key installations".

In June 2011, Hamad commissioned the Bahrain Independent Commission of Inquiry, headed by respected human rights lawyer M. Cherif Bassiouni, to look into the events surrounding the unrest. The establishment of the BICI was praised by Barack Obama and the international community as a step towards establishing responsibility and accountability for the events of the 2011–2012 Bahraini uprising. The BICI reported its findings in November 2011 and US Secretary of State Hillary Clinton "commend[ed] King Hamad bin Isa al-Khalifa's initiative in commissioning it". Although Hamad promised take action to prevent the abuse of detainees by security forces, the Bahraini government failed to implement this. In August 2012, Amnesty International stated that "the government's response has only scratched the surface of these issues. Reforms have been piecemeal, perhaps aiming to appease Bahrain's international partners, and have failed to provide real accountability and justice for the victims".

=== Economic policy ===
When Hamad took power, Bahrain, which had the least oil and financial resources of the GCC states, was experiencing a decline in revenue and growing unemployment, especially among the Shia population. Hamad pursued financial reforms to diversify Bahrain's economy away from the oil industry and to attract foreign investment.

=== Foreign relations ===
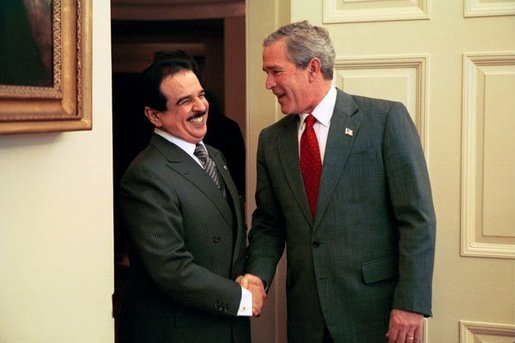
President George W. Bush welcomes Hamad to the Oval Office in 2004

Before and during his reign, Hamad has strongly supported Bahrain's pro-Western and GCC-aligned foreign policy to counter the increasing regional influence of Iran, which includes maintaining close alliances with the United States, the United Kingdom, and the fellow Sunni Muslim monarchy of Saudi Arabia; the latter also having an interest in maintaining Sunni regional hegemony. Bahrain was designated by the US as a major non-NATO ally in 2002, participated in the Saudi-led intervention in the Yemeni civil war that began in 2015, and became the only Arab participant in Operation Prosperity Guardian in 2023 to stop Houthi attacks on commercial vessels.

Hamad appointed Bahrain's first female ambassador in December 1999, when Hayya bin Rashid Al Khalifa was made ambassador to France. He called on Israel to end its occupation of southern Lebanon in February 2000. He visited Qatar in April 2001 and met his counterpart, Emir Hamad bin Khalifa Al Thani, after the International Court of Justice issued its ruling on the countries' territorial dispute over the Hawar Islands, awarding Bahrain the island of Hawar, and Qatar the islands of Jinan and Zubara. Bahrain accepted the verdict, and Hamad described it as a win for both countries, allowing them to improve their relations.

Hamad supported President George W. Bush's initiative against Iraq, and met with Bush in February 2003 amidst the build-up for the invasion of Iraq. He also supported a joint Arab proposal for Saddam Hussein to resign, which he called "the only Arab way out to protect Iraq and spare its people and the whole region the threats" of war. Hamad offered privately and publicly to host Saddam Hussein in Bahrain "in a dignified manner" if he were to step down.

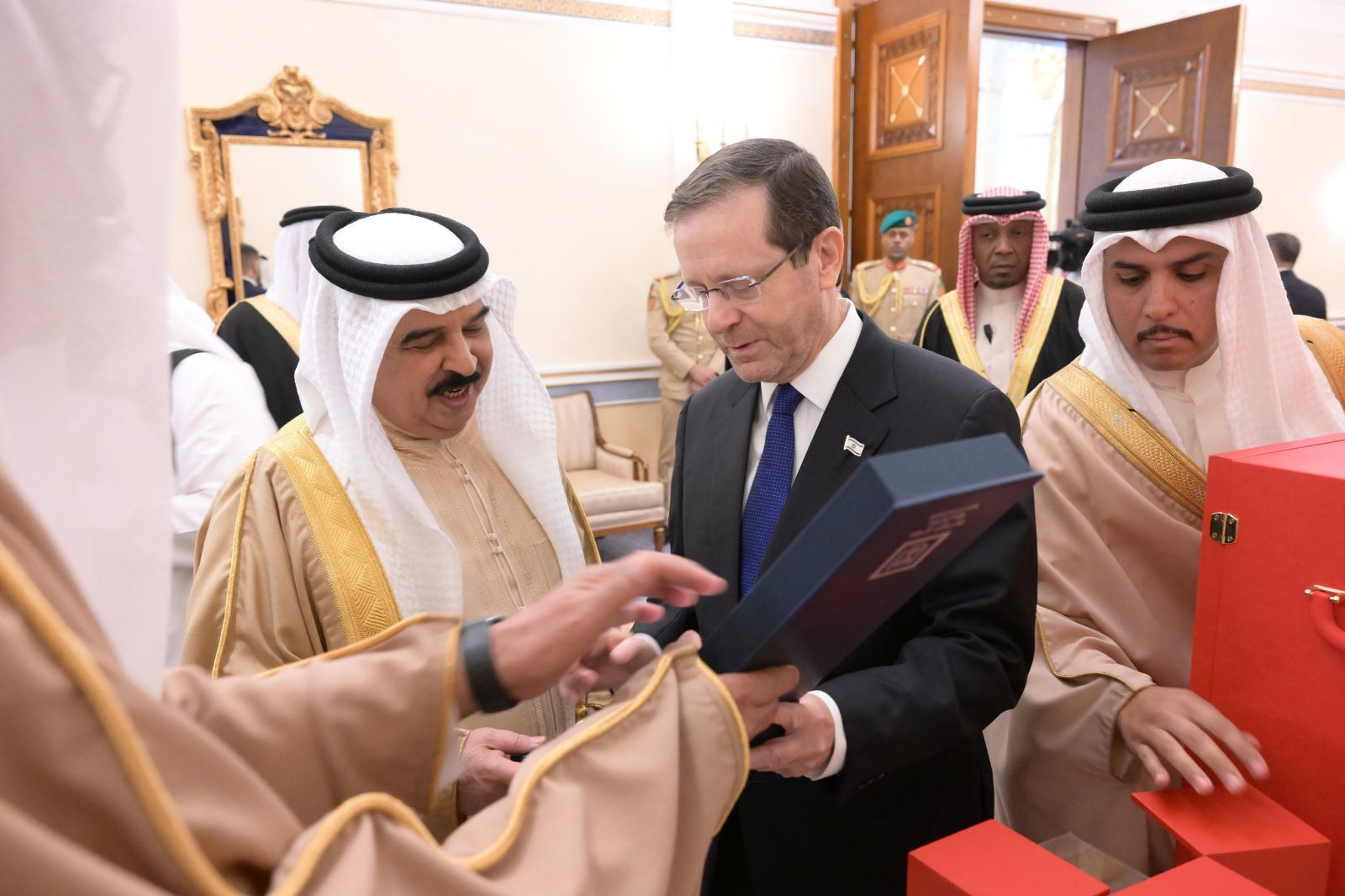
Israeli President Isaac Herzog during a state visit to Bahrain with King Hamad in 2022

In August 2020, Hamad explained to visiting U.S. Secretary of State Mike Pompeo that Bahrain was committed to the creation of a Palestinian state, implicitly rejecting the normalization of ties with Israel. However, on 11 September 2020, it was announced that Bahrain and Israel had agreed to establish full diplomatic relations. The Bahrain–Israel normalization agreement was concluded after a phone call involving King Hamad, Israeli Prime Minister Benjamin Netanyahu, and US President Donald Trump, and is part of the Abraham Accords, a series of agreements between Muslim states and Israel. On 15 September 2020, Bahrain officially opened state to state relations with Israel, signing diplomatic agreements at a public ceremony at the White House in Washington, D.C. Joining the Abraham Accords was controversial in Bahrain, where much of the population opposes the move. On 15 February 2022, Hamad met with Israeli Prime Minister Naftali Bennett in Manama, in the first visit by an Israeli leader to Bahrain. He met Israeli President Isaac Herzog in December 2022, during the first visit to Bahrain by an Israeli head of state.

The king was invited by the British court to the wedding of Prince William, but declined amidst protests by human rights activists, who had pledged to disrupt his stay in Britain because of his violent response to demonstrators. On 18 September 2022, he met with King Charles III at Buckingham Palace, London, to express condolences ahead of the state funeral of Queen Elizabeth II.

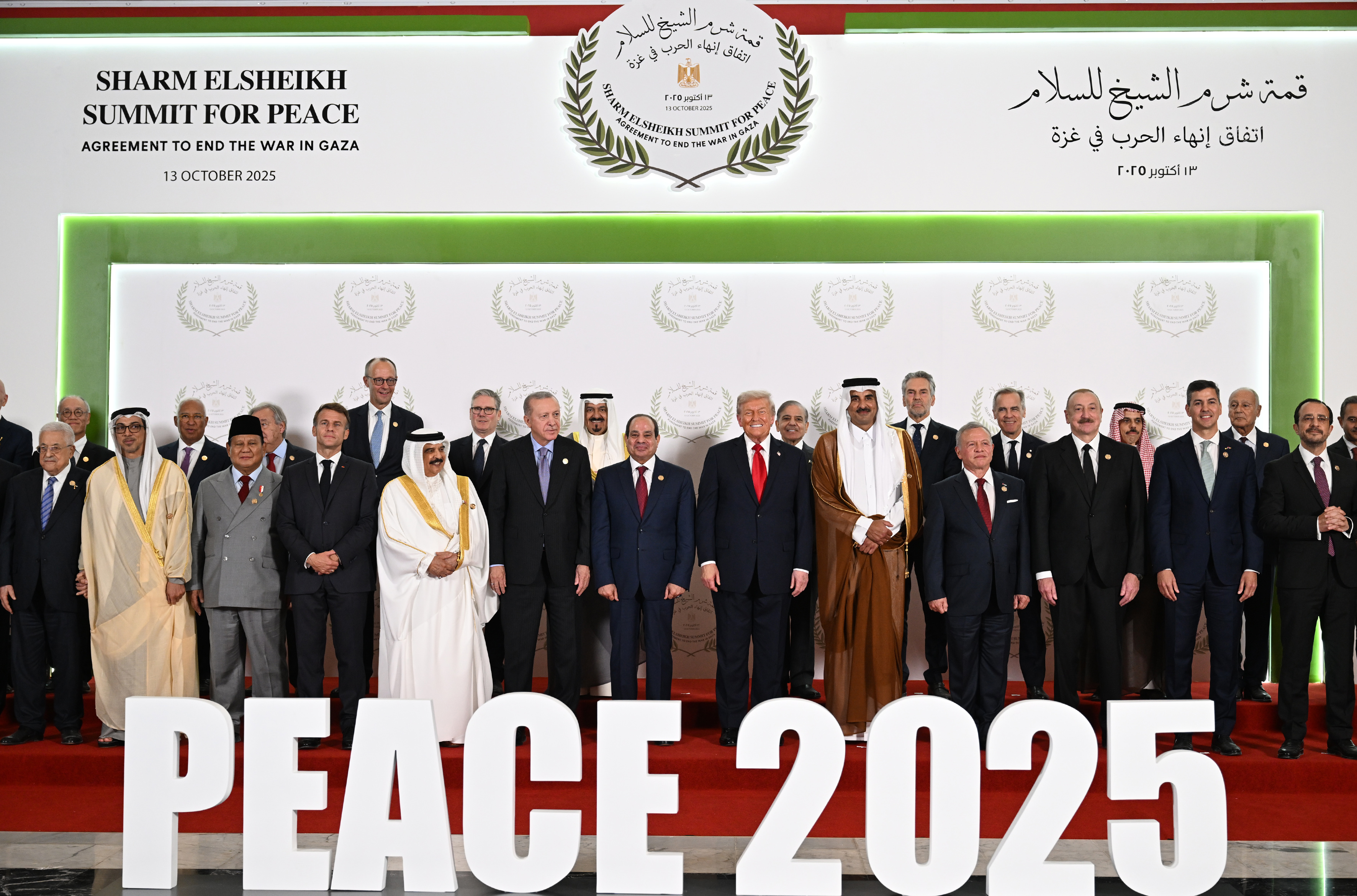
King Hamad at the Gaza peace summit in Sharm El Sheikh, Egypt, in 2025

In September 2023 Bahrain signed the Comprehensive Security Integration and Prosperity Agreement with the US, which it sees as just short of a NATO Article 5-style arrangement. On 2 November 2023, Bahrain recalled its ambassador to Israel, seemingly in response to the Gaza war. That month the Bahraini parliament passed a resolution declaring a suspension of ties with Israel; however, Bahrain's foreign policy is controlled by the executive, and Hamad did not withdraw from the Abraham Accords. Several bilateral agreements with Israel in fields such as tourism and healthcare remain in effect. Bahrain did not develop economic ties to Israel to the same degree as the United Arab Emirates. During the Syrian civil war, in March 2024 Hamad invited Syrian President Bashar al-Assad to attend that year's Arab League summit in Bahrain.

In January 2026, Bahrain received an invitation to join the Board of Peace for the reconstruction of Gaza, and Hamad issued directives on Bahrain's contributions to the board, including to provide funding and other assistance. The decision was made in the context of Hamad's effort to promote tolerance and coexistence as Bahrain's national identity. He attended the first board meeting in the US in February 2026, and the outbreak of the US–Israeli war against Iran later that month did not change his commitment to the project. Hamad met with US military personnel who are assisting Bahrain's air defense. He spoke to Trump on the second day of the war with Iran, who reaffirmed US support for Bahrain's sovereignty, and later in March discussed the war situation with King Abdullah II of Jordan and Egyptian President Abdel Fattah el-Sisi during their visits to Manama. Hamad met with the commander of United States Central Command, Adm. Brad Cooper, in April and in July 2026. Some time in July, Bahrain's air force launched strikes on targets inside Iran, alongside Kuwait and with assistance from the UAE.

== Personal life ==
Hamad has four wives and has had in total twelve children: seven sons and five daughters.

- He married his first wife (also his first cousin), Sheikha Sabika bint Ibrahim Al Khalifa, at Rifa'a on 9 October 1968. She is Bahraini and together they have three sons and one daughter:
  - Sheikh Salman bin Hamad bin Isa Al Khalifa, Crown Prince of Bahrain (born 21 October 1969)
  - Sheikh Abdullah bin Hamad bin Isa Al Khalifa (born 30 June 1975)
  - Sheikh Khalifa bin Hamad Al Khalifa (born 4 June 1978)
  - Sheikha Najla bint Hamad Al Khalifa (born 20 May 1981)
- His second wife, Sheikha Sheia bint Hassan Al Khrayyesh Al Ajmi is from Kuwait. Together they have two sons:
  - Sheikh Nasser bin Hamad Al Khalifa (born 8 May 1987)
  - Sheikh Khalid bin Hamad Al Khalifa (born 23 September 1989)
- His third wife, Sheikha Hessa bint Faisal bin Muhammad bin Shuraim Al Marri, with whom he has one son and two daughters:
  - Sheikha Munira bint Hamad Al Khalifa (born 15 July 1990)
  - Sheikh Faisal bin Hamad Al Khalifa (12 February 1991 – 12 January 2006), died in a car accident.
  - Sheikha Noura bint Hamad Al Khalifa (born 6 November 1993)
- His fourth wife, Sheikha Manal bint Jabor Al Naimi, with whom he has one son and two daughters:
  - Sheikh Sultan bin Hamad Al Khalifa (born 1997)
  - Sheikha Hessa bint Hamad Al Khalifa (born 2000)
  - Sheikha Reema bint Hamad Al Khalifa (born 2002)

== Honours and awards ==
Styles of The King of Bahrain
- Reference style: His Majesty
- Spoken style: Your Majesty

King Hamad has received numerous honours from:

- Jordan: Grand Cordon of the Order of the Star of Jordan (1 February 1967)
- Iraq: Member 1st class of the Order of the Two Rivers (22 February 1969)
- Morocco: Member Special Class of the Order of Muhammad (16 October 1970)
- Jordan: Grand Cordon of the Supreme Order of the Renaissance (1 September 1972)
- Egypt: Grand Cordon of the Order of the Republic (24 January 1973)
- Iran: Collar of the Order of the Crown (28 April 1973)
- Saudi Arabia: Collar of the Order of Abdulaziz al Saud (4 April 1976)
- Indonesia: Star of the Republic of Indonesia, 1st class (8 October 1977)
- Mauritania: Member 1st class of the National Order of Merit (1 April 1978)
- Cyprus: Collar of the Order of Makarios III (9 March 2015)
- Oman: Member 1st class of the Order of Oman (24 October 2022)
- Libya: Member 1st class of the Order of the Grand Conqueror of Libya (1 September 1979)
- Spain: Knight Grand Cross of the Royal Order of Isabella the Catholic (4 December 1981)
- Malaysia: Honorary Recipient of the Most Exalted Order of the Crown of the Realm (DMN, 28 October 2000)
- UAE: Collar of the Order of Zayed (2 February 2005)
- Ireland: Honorary Fellow of the Royal College of Surgeons in Ireland (Hon FRCSI, 2006)
- Yemen: Member 1st class of the Order of the Republic of the Yemen (25 March 2010)
- Denmark: Grand Cross of the Order of the Dannebrog (SK, 4 February 2011)
- France: Grand Cross of the National Order of Merit
- Tunisia: Grand Cordon of the Order of the Republic (27 January 2016)
- Egypt: Collar of the Order of the Nile (26 April 2016)
- Palestine: Grand Collar of the State of Palestine (10 April 2017)
- Brunei: Recipient of the Royal Family Order of the Crown of Brunei (DKMB, 3 May 2017)
- Turkmenistan: Member of the Order of Neutrality (18 March 2019).
- Johor: Grand Commander of the Most Esteemed Royal Family Order of Johor (DK I, 26 November 2017)
- Brazil: Grand Collar of the National Order of the Southern Cross (12 November 2021)
- United Kingdom:
  - Honorary Knight Commander of the Most Distinguished Order of Saint Michael and Saint George (KCMG, 15 February 1979)
  - Honorary Knight Grand Cross of the Royal Victorian Order (GCVO, 13 November 2024)
- United States: Chief Commander of the Legion of Merit (19 January 2021)
- Russia: Honorary Doctorate from Moscow State Institute of International Relations (2 July 2021)

== See also ==
- Politics of Bahrain

== Notes ==
Hamad bin Isa Al Khalifa House of Khalifa Born: 28 January 1950
Regnal titles
Preceded by Isa bin Salman Al Khalifa	Emir of Bahrain; 1999–2002	Became King
New title	King of Bahrain; 2002–present	Incumbent; Heir apparent: Salman bin Hamad bin Isa Al Khalifa
