= Khalid bin Abdullah Al Khalifa =

Deputy prime minister of Bahrain

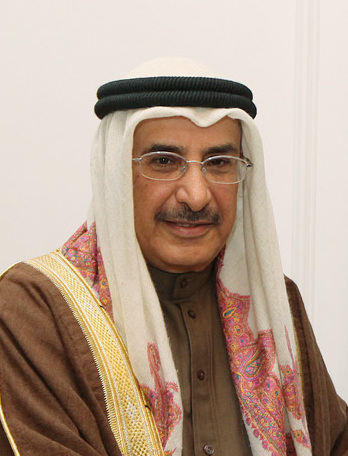

Deputy Prime Minister of Bahrain
- In office: November 2010 – present
- Monarch: King Hamad

Minister of Housing
- In office: 1975 – 1995
- Monarch: Isa bin Salman Al Khalifa
- Born: 1944 (age 81–82); Muharraq, Bahrain
- House: Al Khalifa
- Father: Abdullah bin Khalid bin Ali Al Khalifa

Styles of Sheikh Khalid bin Abdullah Al Khalifa
- Reference style: His Excellency
- Spoken style: Your Excellency
- Alternative style: Sheikh

Khalid bin Abdullah Al Khalifa (Note: Arabic: خالد بن عبد الله آل خليفة) (born 1944) is a Bahraini royal, engineer and Deputy Prime Minister of Bahrain.

== Family ==
His full name is Sheikh Khalid bin Abdullah bin Khalid bin Ali bin Khalifa bin Salman bin Ahmed bin Mohammed bin Khalifa Al Khalifa. Born in 1944 in the northern city of Muharraq, he was named after his grandfather, Sheikh Khalid bin Ali Al Khalifa (1853–1925). Khalid bin Abdullah is the second of four sons of Sheikh Abdullah bin Khalid Al Khalifa and his wife Sheikha Hessa bint Muhammad bin Abdullah Al Khalifa, both now deceased. Sheikh Abdullah bin Khalid chaired the Supreme Council for Islamic Affairs from its establishment in 2005 until his death in 2018. He also held ministerial positions such as Deputy Prime Minister of Bahrain and Minister of Islamic Affairs (2002–2006).

Sheikh Khalid bin Abdullah’s brothers include the following, ranked from eldest to youngest:

- Muhammad bin Abdullah bin Khalid, a physician and lieutenant general in the military, Ministry of Defense from 2006 to 2010 and current Chairman of the Supreme Council of Health
- Ali bin Abdullah bin Khalid (died August 2009), also a doctor, and his son is Sheikh Khalid bin Ali bin Abdullah bin Khalid Al Khalifa, current Minister of Justice, Islamic Affairs, and Endowments
- Ibrahim, a retired engineer who worked on King Fahd Causeway linking the island with Saudi Arabia, holds a Bachelor of Science degree in engineering from King Fahd University of Petroleum and Minerals

== Personal life ==
Sheikh Khalid bin Abdullah has nine children, four sons and five daughters, all from his wife Mariam bint Salman Al Khalifa, sister of the late Emir of Bahrain Sheikh Isa bin Salman Al Khalifa, the late Prime Minister of Bahrain Khalifa bin Salman Al Khalifa, and the late Prince Mohammed ibn Salman Al Khalifa (who died on November 9, 2009). She is also the aunt of King of Bahrain Hamad bin Isa Al Khalifa.

Their children include the following:

- Sheikha Zain bint Khalid bin Abdullah, wife of Sheikh Ali bin Khalifa Al Khalifa, her cousin and the Deputy Prime Minister; she has headed the Al-Mabarrah Al-Khalifia Foundation since May 30, 2011
- Farah bint Khalid bin Abdullah
- Sheikha Hessa bint Khalid bin Abdullah, Chair of the Women’s Committees of the Bahrain Football Association and the Union of Arab Football Associations
- Dhuwa bint Khalid bin Abdullah
- Nouf bint Khalid bin Abdullah
- Salman bin Khalid bin Abdullah
- Abdullah bin Khalid bin Abdullah, Chairman of the Board of Riffa SC
- Isa bin Khalid bin Abdullah
- Khalifa bin Khalid bin Abdullah

== Education ==
Khalid bin Abdullah Al Khalifa received a bachelor's degree in civil engineering from Cairo University.

== Career ==
Khalifa worked as a roads engineer in the directorate of works in 1966. He became the director of public works in 1971. From 1975 to 1995 he served as the minister of housing, being the first housing minister of the country.

In 1979, he founded Bahrain Housing Bank and headed it until 2002. In addition, he was the chairman of the central municipal council from 1987 to 1995. He was named minister of housing, municipalities and environment in 1995 and in office until 2001. In 2001, Khalifa was appointed minister of housing and agriculture and served in the post until 2002.

He was appointed deputy prime minister for Islamic affairs in November 2010. He was also the CEO of Bahrain Committee and chairman of Mumtalakat Holding Company.

=== Committee memberships ===
- Member, Ministerial Committee for Development and Infrastructure Projects
- Chairman, Ministerial Committee for Financial and Economic Affairs
- Member, Supreme Planning Committee for 2011–2014 government sessions
- Chairman of the Board, Quality Assurance Authority for Education and Training
- Member, Ministerial Committee for Study of Parliamentary Investigation Errors
- Member, Planning and Coordination Council
- Member, Founding Committee of Beit Al Quran Museum
- Member, Supreme Council for Youth and Sports
- Member, Supreme Council for Traffic
- Member, Study Committee on Municipal Government
- Member, Supreme Drafting Committee for the National Action Charter
- Member, Committee on Constitutional Amendments
- Member, Housing and Construction Committee
- Chairman, Bahraini Section, Joint Ministerial Technical Committee for Construction of the Qatar–Bahrain Causeway
- Chairman, Ministerial Committee for Public Utilities, Cabinet
- Chairman, Ministerial Committee for Study of Pension Funding for the General Organization for Social Insurance and Pension Fund Authority
- Member, Ministerial Committee for Shura Council and Parliament Affairs
- Deputy Chairman, Review Committee for the National Strategic Structural Plan for the Kingdom
- Chairman, Pearl Diving Council
- Chairman, Ministerial Committee for Study of the Needs of Returnees from Abroad
- Founding member, Bahrain Society of Engineers
- Chairman, Water Resources Council
- Chairman, Ministerial Committee for Development and Infrastructure Projects
- Chairman, Ministerial Committee for Financial Affairs and Rationalising Expenditure
- Member, Bahrain Economic Development Board
- Member of the Coordinating Committee Headed by Salman, Crown Prince of Bahrain
- Chairman of the Board, Mumtalakat Holding Company
- Chairman, Gulf Air
- Vice-Chairman of the Board of Trustees, Isa Award for Services to Humanity
- Vice-President, Civil Service Bureau
- Chairman, High Committee for the Development of the Hawar Islands
- Member, Supreme Committee for Information and Communication Technology
- Member since 1981, Royal Family Council

=== Achievements ===
==== Awards ====
In 1999, he was awarded the Sheikh Isa bin Salman Al Khalifa Medal, First Class, by then-Emir Sheikh Hamad bin Isa Al Khalifa

==== Ministry of Housing ====
- Oversaw the completion of Isa Town, whose construction had started in 1963
- Commissioned the Ministry slogan: توفير مسكن لائق لكل أسرة بحرينية لا تملك ولا تستطيع بناء مسكن لها (“Providing decent housing for every Bahraini family who doesn’t own and cannot build a home”)
- Planned out Hamad Town and many residential projects elsewhere, along with general redevelopment throughout the country, including many old city centers

==== Central Municipal Council ====
- Concentrated on administrative and technical training and environmental issues; established parks; developed beaches, tourist islands, and central markets; promoted computerization

==== Environmental affairs ====
- Restored in Tubli Bay and prevented dumping there; protected Hawar Islands and surrounding waters; performed environmental assessments and formulated procedures for control on ozone-depleting substances; regulated asbestos handling in construction
- Approved a national oil pollution control plan and national standards on environmental assessment of industrial/development projects, medical waste, occupational health, and the pottery industry
- Monitored air quality, red tide, marine ecology, and fluoride concentrations
- Addressed pollution from mechanics’ garages, gold and aluminum smelting, exhaust, nylon bags, and marine sand washing

==== Events ====
Sheikh Khalid sponsored many local events in the engineering, environmental, construction, real estate, energy, housing, government, and infrastructure fields, and represented Bahrain in international forums such as the following:

- Headed national delegation to the 19th special session of the United Nations General Assembly Special Session on the Environment in 1997
- Headed national delegation at the 25th special session of the United Nations Conference on Human Settlements in 2002
- Headed national government and business delegation to Egypt that met with its then Interim President Adly Mansour and Commander-in-Chief of the Army and Defense Minister Abdel Fattah Al-Sisi in 2013
- Represented Bahrain at the Conference on Interaction and Confidence-Building Measures in Asia (CICA) in Shanghai in 2014
- Represented Bahrain at the international solidarity march against terrorism called by the President of Tunisia in response to the Bardo National Museum attack in March 2015
- Represented Bahrain at the last inauguration ceremony of President of Sudan Omar al-Bashir
