= Ahmed bin Ali bin Abdulla Al Khalifa =

Bahraini businessman

Sheikh Ahmed bin Ali bin Abdulla Al Khalifa (Arabic: أحمد بن علي بن عبدالله آل خليفة) is a Bahraini businessman who serves as the board chairman and president of Al-Muharraq SC based in Al-Muharraq and chairman of Zain Bahrain, Al Areen Holding Company

== Biography ==
Al Khalifa was vice-chairman of the Board of Directors for Al-Muharraq SC from 1978 to 1989 and has chaired it since April 1994. He also held two festivals under the patronage of Prime Minister of Bahrain Khalifa bin Salman Al Khalifa (the first on April 17, 1996, and the second on April 26, 2000) to honor pioneering businesspeople in Muharraq.
