= Jawad Al Arrayed =

Bahraini lawyer (born 1941)

Deputy Prime Minister of Bahrain
- In office 11 December 2006 – 14 June 2022
- Prime Minister: Khalifa bin Salman Al Khalifa; Salman bin Hamad Al Khalifa
- Preceded by: Abdullah bin Khalid Al Khalifa
- Succeeded by: Khalid bin Abdullah Al Khalifa

Minister of Justice
- In office November 2002 – January 2005
- Preceded by: Abdullah bin Khalid Al Khalifa
- Succeeded by: Mohammed Ali Sitri

Personal details
- Born: 1941 (age 84–85)
- Education: Cairo University; Leeds University

Jawad Salem Al Arrayed (born 1941) is a lawyer and former cabinet member in Bahrain. Currently, he is President of the Ministerial Committee for Legal Affairs (effectively, the General Counsel to the Cabinet) and former deputy prime minister in the Kingdom of Bahrain.

Arrayed was born in 1940 in Manama. He holds a degree in English literature, which he received from Cairo University. In addition, he also holds a law degree, which he obtained from Leeds University.

== Career ==
Public Service

Arrayed was a public prosecutor from 1969 to 1971. He became labor and social affairs minister in 1971 and minister of state for cabinet affairs from 1972 to 1982. Next he was appointed health minister in 1982. His tenure as health minister lasted until 1995. He was then appointed as minister f state for municipalities and environmental affairs in June 1995.

National Claims for the Hawar Islands

As one of the highest ranking Bahrainis educated and trained as a lawyer, Al Arrayed advised Isa bin Salman Al Khalifa and his government on the emirate's legal battle with Qatar over the Hawar Islands. In that international dispute, Al Arayyed submitted to the International Court of Justice that Bahrain is sovereign over the Hawar Islands, including Janan and Hadd Janan. Bahrain, as a result of the work and advocacy by Minister Al Arrayed and its other legal advisers, ultimately prevailed at the ICJ, and these islands were recognized by the community of nations as belonging to Bahrain.

Other Cabinet Positions

Al Arrayed served as municipality minister from 1999 to November 2002. He was appointed Minister of Justice on 11 November 2002. His term lasted until 2005 and he was replaced by Mohammed Ali Sitri. During this period he was also advisor to the prime minister for legal affairs.

He was appointed Deputy Prime Minister of Bahrain in the reshuffle on 11 December 2006 that followed the victory of Shia Islamist party, Al Wefaq, in parliamentary elections. He replaced a member of the royal family, Abdullah bin Khalid Al Khalifa, in the post. Arrayed is also president of the ministerial committee for legal affairs.
