= Khalifa bin Salman Al Khalifa =

Bahraini royal, prime minister from 1970 to 2020

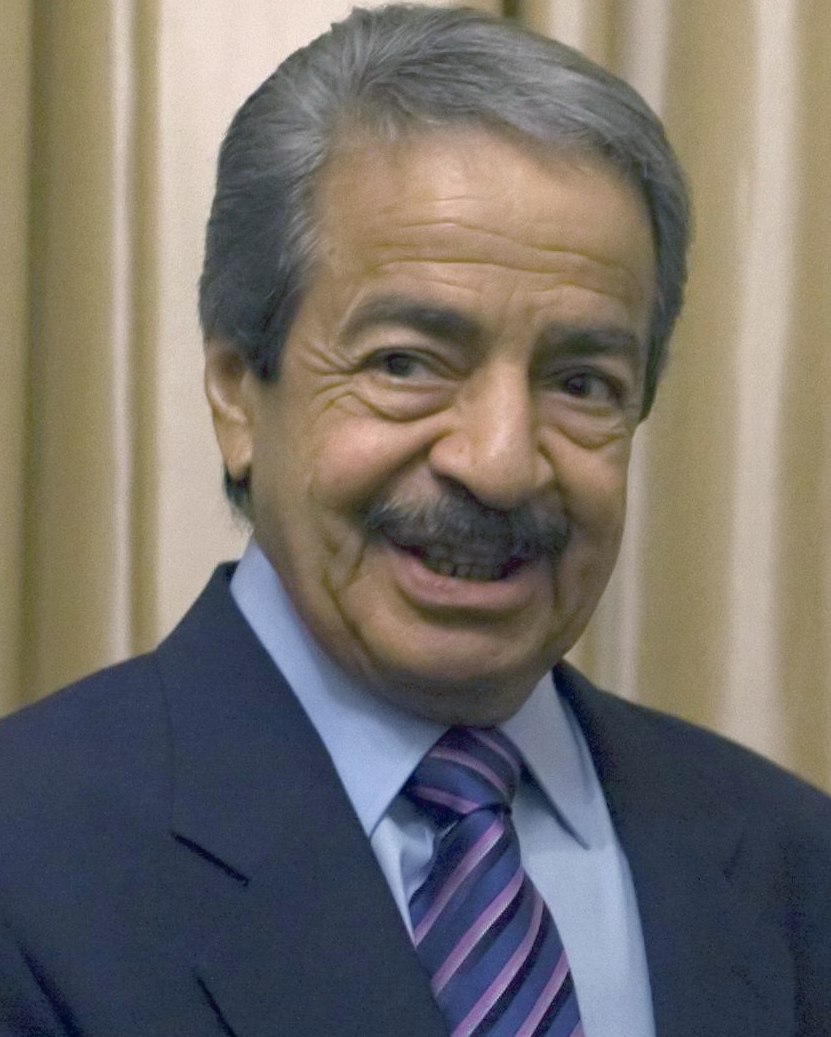
- Khalifa in 2010

1st Prime Minister of Bahrain
- In office 10 January 1970 – 11 November 2020
- Monarchs: Isa bin Salman; Hamad bin Isa
- Deputy: List: Salman bin Hamad Al Khalifa (2013–2020 as First Deputy) Abdullah bin Khalid Al Khalifa (2002–2005) Muhammad ibn Mubarak ibn Hamad Al Khalifah (2002–2020) Ali bin Khalifa Al Khalifa (2005–2020) Jawad Al-Arrayedh (2006–2020) Khalid bin Abdullah Al Khalifa (2010–2020)
- Preceded by: Position established
- Succeeded by: Salman bin Hamad Al Khalifa
- Born: 24 November 1935; Jasra, Bahrain
- Died: 11 November 2020 (aged 84); Rochester, Minnesota, U.S.
- Burial: 13 November 2020; Riffa, Bahrain
- Spouse: Hessa bint Ali Al Khalifa
- Issue: 4
- House: Khalifa
- Father: Salman bin Hamad, Emir of Bahrain
- Mother: Mouza bint Hamad Al Khalifa

Khalifa bin Salman Al Khalifa (Arabic: خليفة بن سلمان آل خليفة; 24 November 1935 – 11 November 2020) was a Bahraini politician and member of the Al Khalifa royal family who served as the Prime Minister of Bahrain from 10 January 1970 until his death in 2020. He took office over a year before Bahrain achieved its independence in 31 August 1971. Khalifa was considered the effective leader of Bahrain during the reign of his brother, Isa bin Salman Al Khalifa, until the monarch's death in 1999, and remained influential under Isa's successor Hamad bin Isa Al Khalifa. He was the longest-serving prime minister in the world at the time of his death.

During the reign of Isa, Khalifa was responsible for overseeing the government and the economy while the emir focused on diplomatic and ceremonial work. He is credited for developing the economy of Bahrain and for building the modern Bahraini state. Known for his politically conservative views, he led the government's response to the 1990s uprising in Bahrain, which called for political and economic reform, by arresting thousands of people. He also took a hard-line position during the 2011 Bahraini uprising and supported a crackdown.

== Early life and education ==
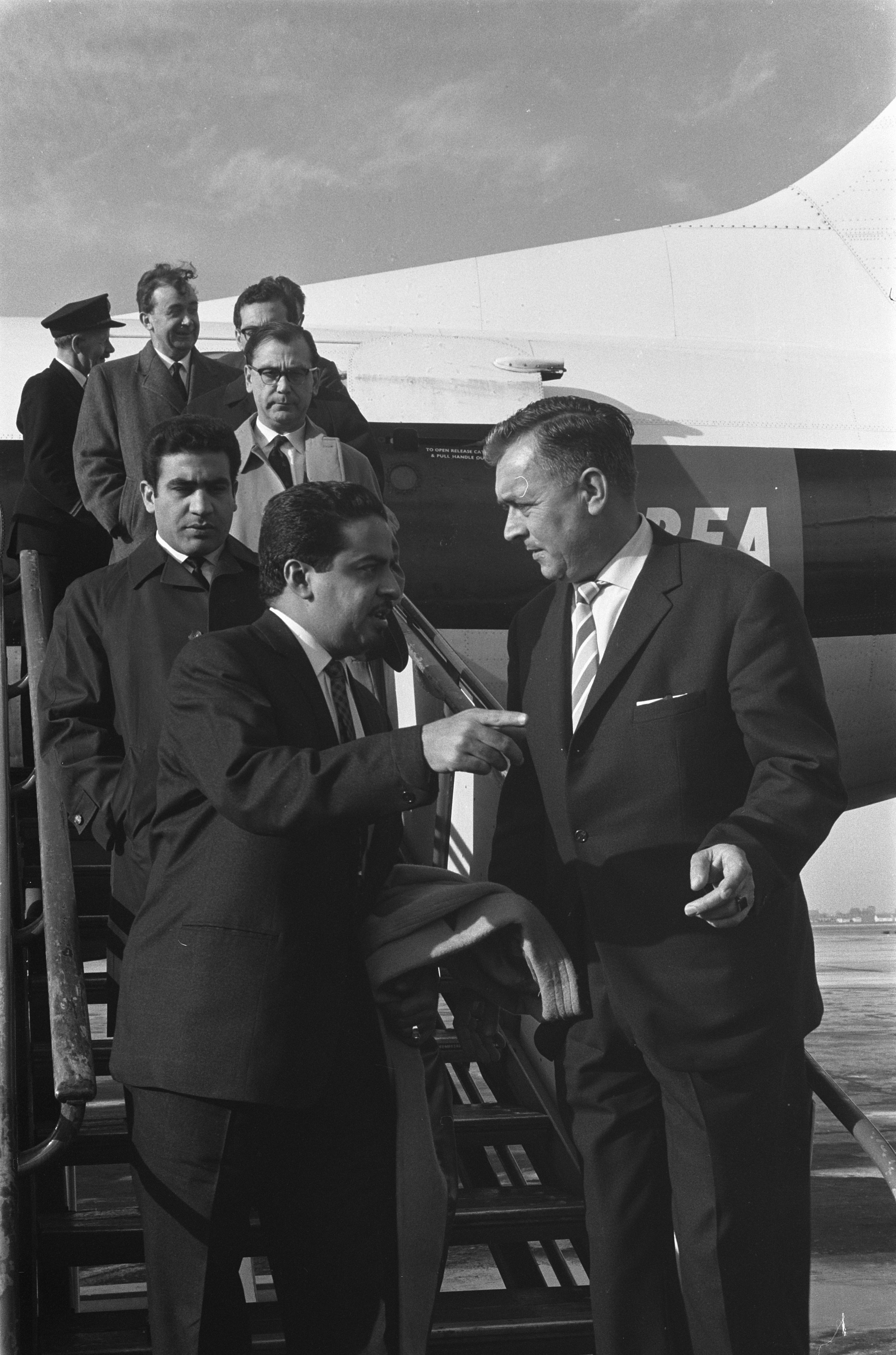
Sheikh Khalifa (left) in 1962

Prince Khalifa was born on 24 November 1935, the second son of Salman ibn Hamad Al Khalifa, Hakim of Bahrain, and his wife Mouza bint Hamad Al Khalifa. He was educated at Manama High School and the Rifa’a Palace School in Bahrain.

== Career ==
Prince Khalifa was a member of the education council from 1956 to 1958 and chair between 1958 and 1961. Next he became the director of the finance department (1961–1966), president of the electricity board (1961), chair of the Manama municipal council (1962–1967), head of the Bahrain monetary council (1964), chair of the joint committee for economic and financial studies, committee member for the register of commerce, then chairman of the administrative affairs council (1967–1969), became board member of the Bahrain monetary agency and then chairperson of the State Council (1972–1974), head of the State Council (1972), and head of the Supreme Defence Council (1977).

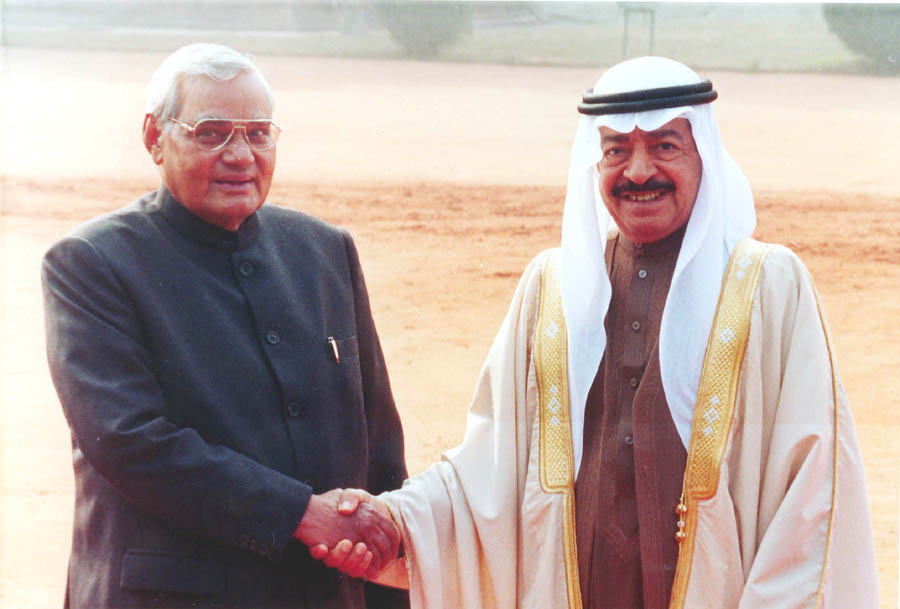
Khalifa bin Salman Al Khalifa being received by Indian Prime Minister Atal Bihari Vajpayee in New Delhi, 2004

Prince Khalifa was appointed as prime minister by his brother Emir Isa bin Salman Al Khalifa, in 1971. Therefore, he was assigned the control of government and economy, while his brother, the Emir, was involved in diplomatic and ceremonial affairs. Khalifa effectively ran the country since it became independent, while his brother the emir had a largely ceremonial role. After the death of Isa in 1999 and the accession of Hamad bin Isa Al Khalifa, he continued to wield great influence, though Hamad tried to counterbalance him with his crown prince, Salman bin Hamad Al Khalifa.

Prince Khalifa is the founder of the Housing Ministry, and he reformed the Central Bank of Bahrain. During his premiership he was the head of the Oil and Economic Policy Council.

== Death ==
Prince Khalifa experienced various health problems. In September 2019, he went to Germany for treatment, and returned to Bahrain in March 2020. He headed the cabinet for the last time in July 2020 and went to the United States for treatment the following month. He died at the Mayo Clinic Hospital in Rochester, Minnesota on 11 November 2020, 13 days before his 85th birthday. Serving 50 years and 11 months in office, he was the longest-serving prime minister in the world at the time of his death.

On 12 November, his body was flown back to Bahrain, where he was buried the following day at Hunainiyah Cemetery in Riffa. Bahraini authorities ordered a seven-day national mourning period with flags half-masted and government institutions closed for three days. Bangladesh observed a day of state mourning on 17 November with flags half-masted.

== Personal life ==
=== Views ===
In 2011, reporter Bill Law stated that Prince Khalifa was a hardliner, whereas Crown Prince Salman, his grandnephew who was the deputy prime minister, and now is the Prime Minister, was a reformer and the King was somewhere in the middle of the two.

=== Finances ===
According to the Pandora Papers, leaked in 2021 after his death, Prince Khalifa owned a shell company created in 1996 that held assets worth $60 million.

=== Family ===
Prince Khalifa married his cousin Hessa bint Ali Al Khalifa, the fourth daughter of Ali bin Hamad Al Khalifa in Muharraq. They had three sons and one daughter:

- Mohammad bin Khalifa Al Khalifa (died 1974).
- Ali bin Khalifa Al Khalifa – Former deputy prime minister. He married Zayn bint Khalid Al Khalifa with whom he has three sons and one daughter:
  - Khalifa bin Ali Al Khalifa
  - Isa bin Ali Al Khalifa
  - Minwa bint Ali Al Khalifa
  - Khalid bin Ali Al Khalifa
- Salman bin Khalifa Al Khalifa
- Lulwa bint Khalifa Al Khalifa – honorary president of the Al Noor beneficence society. She married Rashid bin Khalifa Al Khalifa (born 1952), artist and patron of the arts. They have four sons and three daughters.
  - Noor bint Rashid Al Khalifa
  - Khalifa bin Rashid Al Khalifa
  - Hassa bint Rashid Al Khalifa
  - Abdulla bin Rashid Al Khalifa
  - Aysha bint Rashid Al Khalifa

== Honours ==
Foreign honours

- Malaysia: Honorary Grand Commander of the Order of the Defender of the Realm (SMN, 30 January 2001)
- Philippines: Order of Sikatuna (7 November 2001)
- Spain: Knight Grand Cross of the Order of Isabella the Catholic (4 December 1981)

== See also ==
- Cabinet of Bahrain

Political offices
New office	Prime Minister of Bahrain; 1970–2020	Succeeded by Salman bin Hamad Al Khalifa
