= Cabinet of Dominica =

The Cabinet of Dominica is appointed by the President of Dominica acting in accordance with the advice of the Prime Minister of Dominica.

== Ministers of Dominica (17 December 2019 – present) ==
- Roosevelt Skerrit: Prime Minister, Minister for Finance, Economic Affairs, Investment, Planning, Resilience, Sustainable Development, Telecommunications and Broadcasting
- Reginald Austrie: Minister of Housing and Urban Development
- Rayburn Blackmoore: Minister of National Security and Home Affairs
- Kenneth Darroux: Minister of Foreign Affairs, International Business and Diaspora Relations
- Fidel Grant: Minister of Blue and Green Economy, Agriculture and National Food Security
- Denise Charles: Minister of Tourism, International Transport and Maritime Initiatives
- Adis King: Minister of Youth Development and Empowerment, Youth at Risk, Gender Affairs, Seniors' Security and Dominicans With Disabilities
- Ian Douglas: Minister of Trade, Commerce, Entrepreneurship, Innovation, Business and Export Development
- Greta Roberts: Minister of Governance, Public Service Reform, Citizen Empowerment, Social Justice and Ecclesiastical Affairs
- Cozier Frederick: Minister of Environment, Rural Modernization and Kalinago Upliftment
- Irving McIntyre: Minister of Health, Wellness and New Health Investment
- Cassanni Laville: Minister of Public Works and the Digital Economy
- Roselyn Paul: Minister of Sports, Culture and Community Development
- Octavia Alfred: Minister of Education, Human resource Planning, Vocational Training and National Excellence

=== Ministers of State ===
- Oscar George: Minister of State in the Office of the Prime Minister with Responsibility for Telecommunications and Broadcasting
- Gregory "Karessah" Riviere: Minister of State in the Ministry of Finance, Economic Affairs and Planning
- The Late Edward Registe: Minister of State in the Ministry of Foreign Affairs, International Business and Diaspora

=== Parliamentary Secretaries ===
- Chekira Lockhart-Hypolite: Parliamentary Secretary in the Ministry of Tourism, International Transport, and Maritime Initiatives, with special responsibility for Air and Sea Port Operations
- Kent Edwards: Parliamentary Secretary in the Ministry of Health, Wellness and New Health Investment, with particular responsibility for Community and Home Care

== Ministers of Dominica (11 April 2018 – 16 December 2019) ==
- Hon. Roosevelt Skerrit – Prime Minister and Minister for Finance, Investments, Housing and Lands
- Hon. Reginald Austrie – Deputy Prime Minister and Minister for Agriculture Food and Fisheries
- Hon. Levi A. Peter - Attorney General
- Hon. Dr. John Colin McIntyre – Minister for Public Works, Water Resource Management and Ports
- Hon. Joseph Isaac - Minister for the Environment, Climate Resilience, Disaster Management and Urban Renewal
- Hon. Dr. Kenneth Darroux – Minister for Health and Social Services
- Hon. Senator Miriam Blanchard – Minister for Planning, and Economic Development
- Hon. Senator Robert Tonge – Minister for Tourism and Culture
- Hon. Catherine Lady Daniel – Minister for Ecclesiastical Affairs, Family and Gender Affairs
- Hon. Justina Charles – Minister for Youth, Sports, and Constituency Empowerment
- Hon. jaco parrot – Minister for Justice, Immigration and National Security
- Hon. Senator Francine Baron – Minister for Foreign and CARICOM Affairs
- Hon. Ian Douglas – Minister for Trade, Energy and Employment
- Hon. Petter Saint. Jean – Minister for Education and Human Resource Development
- Hon. Roslyn Paul – Minister for Commerce, Enterprise and Small Business Development
- Hon. Kelver Darroux – Minister for Information, Science, Telecommunications and Technology
- Hon. Cassius Darroux – Minister for Kalinago Affairs
- Hon. Johnson Drigo – Minister in the Ministry of Housing and Lands
- Hon. Ivor Stephenson – Parliamentary Secretary in the Ministry of Health and Social Services

== Ministers of Dominica ( – 10 April 2018) ==
- Roosevelt Skerrit - Prime Minister and Minister for Finance, and Public Service
- Levi Peter - Attorney General
- Justina Charles - Minister for Youth, Sports, Culture and Constituency Empowerment
- John Collin McIntyre - Minister for Planning, economic Development and Investment
- Reginald Austrie - Minister for Housing, Lands and Water Resource Management
- Senator Mirium Blanchard - Minister for Public Works and Ports
- Johnson Drigo - Minister for Agriculture and Fisheries
- Catherine Daniel - Minister for Social Services, Family and Gender Affairs
- Ian Douglas - Minister for Trade, Energy and Employment
- Rayburn Blackmoore - Minister for Justice, Immigration and National Security
- Petter Saint-Jean - Minister for Education and Human Resource Development
- Roselyn Paul - Minister for Commerce, Enterprise and Small Business Development
- Kenneth Darroux - Minister for Health and Environment
- Kelver Darroux - Minister for Information, Science, Telecommunication and Technology
- Casius Darroux - Minister for Kalinago Affairs
- Senator Robert Tonge - Minister for Tourism and Urban Renewal
- Senator Francine Baron - Foreign Affairs and CARICOM Affairs
- - Minister of State in the Office of the Prime Minister, responsible for Project Planning and Implementation
- Ivor Stephenson - Parliamentary Secretary in the Ministry of Health and Environment with specific responsibility for the Environment
