= Capital punishment in Eswatini =

Capital punishment is a legal penalty in Eswatini, formerly known as Swaziland. Despite its legality, no executions have been carried out since 1983. Therefore, Eswatini is classified as "abolitionist in practice."

No new death sentences were recorded in 2021. One person was known to be on death row in Eswatini at the end of 2021.

== Capital punishment law ==
Eswatini's only official method of execution is hanging, a method for that almost all former British colonies and protectorates adopted.

Eswatini is not a signatory to the International Covenant on Civil and Political Rights; likewise, they are also not a party to the Second Optional Protocol to the ICCPR, which specifically pertains to the abolition of capital punishment. Eswatini voted against the United Nations moratorium on the death penalty proposed in 2010.

The death penalty is not a mandatory punishment for any crime in Eswatini. Under Eswatini's law, the King presides over the judiciary, executive, and legislative branches of government. The King retains the final authority over when executions will take place. Eswatini's current King, Mswati III, was officially crowned in 1986 and has not permitted any executions under his rule.

== Most recent executions ==
Between Eswatini's independence from the United Kingdom in 1968 and their most recent execution in 1983, the country carried out 34 executions.

The most recent executions in Eswatini occurred on 2 July 1983, when eight people, seven men and one woman, were hanged in the capital, Mbabane, for various crimes. The woman was a 48-year-old restaurant owner named Philippa Mdluli, who murdered her employee's 2-year-old daughter for her body parts in a perversion of muti, a traditional natural medicine practice in southern Africa. Authorities did not provide details on the crimes that led to the other seven executions that day. Eswatini officials enlisted in the aid of an executioner from South Africa to carry out the executions.

== Recent developments ==
In March 1998, cattle farmer Daniel Mbhundlana Dlamini was sentenced to death for a ritual murder of a 9-year-old boy. He was expected to have been executed by the end of the year, but officials could not find anyone to carry out the execution; Eswatini Justice Minister Maweni Simelani announced to the media that officials were in need of a "hangperson. . . . who has what it takes" to carry out the executions of Eswatini's remaining death row inmates, clarifying, "I must indicate that women are welcome. I therefore advise them to try their luck." Simelani reportedly received inquiries from candidates in several countries across southern Africa.

In 2000, five men were sentenced to death by hanging. They had participated in the double murder of a pastor and his wife after accusing them of witchcraft.

On 1 April 2011, David Thabo Simelane, a serial killer who was responsible for between 28 and 45 murders of women and children, received the death penalty nine days after a jury convicted him. Authorities believed that Simelane began murdering people in the 1990s and continued until 25 April 2001, when a tip led police to arrest him. Nine years passed between his arrest and his death sentence.

As a nation that has not carried out any death sentences in at least 10 years, Amnesty International considers Eswatini to be de facto abolitionist, or "abolitionist in practice."
