= David Thabo Simelane =

Swazi serial killer (born 1956)

- Born: 1956 (age 69–70); Swaziland
- Other name: David Albert Mhlanga
- Conviction: Murder
- Penalty: Death

Details
- Victims: 28 confirmed, 45 suspected
- Span of crimes: 2000–2001
- Country: Swaziland
- State: Manzini District

David Thabo Simelane (born 1956) is a Swazi serial killer sentenced to death for the murder of 28 women, but is suspected of murdering 45.

== Murders ==
Simelane left school, although his uncle tried to enable him to attend secondary school.

He testified in court that he had been sentenced to six years' imprisonment for robbing and raping a woman. Then, after his release in 1998, he set out to seek revenge by starting a murder series. The killings lasted from the late 1990s until 2001, when the police arrested him on public grounds.

Simelane made women go with him in the forest. He then tied his victims there and sexually assaulted them, stabbing or strangling them with his bare hands if they resisted too much. He also beheaded many of them, before or after death. Simelane often stole his victims' money and valuables to participate in gambling. Among his victims were several pregnant women.

== Investigation ==
Shepherds in search of a runaway cow discovered body parts in the Usuthu-Pulp Forest in Malkerns and notified the authorities, who soon asked six South African forensics experts for administrative assistance.

Simelane was arrested on 25 April 2001 on a street near the graves and led the police to more graves, from which 45 bodies were found. Even the bodies of four babies were among the dead. Because of the highly advanced decay, Simelane was charged with 34 murders.

He cooperated with investigators and, during his interrogation, confessed to having been wearing the T-shirt of one of his victims.

== Conviction ==
During the trial he was found guilty of murder in 28 cases and sentenced to death by hanging. He showed no remorse for his actions during his trial.

After an appeal to the Swazi Supreme Court in November 2011, it was decided that the trial took an inadmissibly long time, but the death sentence that awaited Simelane has been confirmed. Since the execution of murderer Philippa Mdluli in 1983, Eswatini has become a de facto abolitionist country, not carrying out any death sentence since that year.

== See also ==
- List of serial killers by number of victims
