= Rashid bin Khalifa Al Khalifa =

Bahraini painter

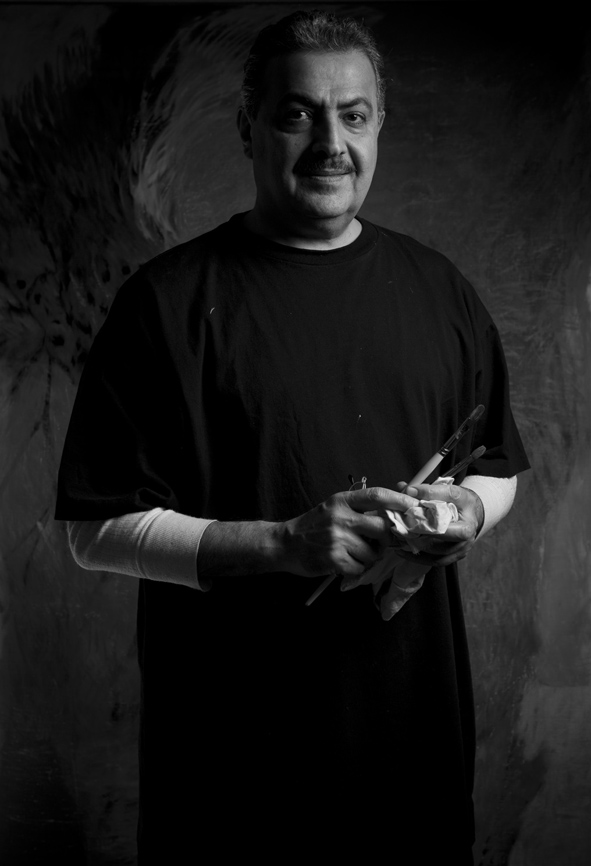
- Portrait of Rashid al Khalifa
- Born: 1952 (age 72–73); Riffa, Bahrain
- Known for: Painting
- Movement: Impressionism; Realism; Abstract; Individualism
- Spouse: Luluwah bint Khalifa Al Khalifa
- Children: 6
- Father: Sheikh Khalifa bin Hamad Al Khalifa
- Website: www.rashidalkhalifa.com

Sheikh Rashid bin Khalifa Al Khalifa (born 1952) is an interdisciplinary Bahraini visual artist and member of the Bahraini royal family. He is the current Chairman of Bahrain’s National Council for Arts and honorary president of the Bahrain Arts Society.

Beginning with landscape painting in the late 1960s, Rashid has been making art for over 50 years. His most recent work explores his immediate landscape and the traditional architecture of his homeland through wall-mounted, aluminum installations. He is widely considered one of Bahrain’s most renowned artists.

== Biography ==
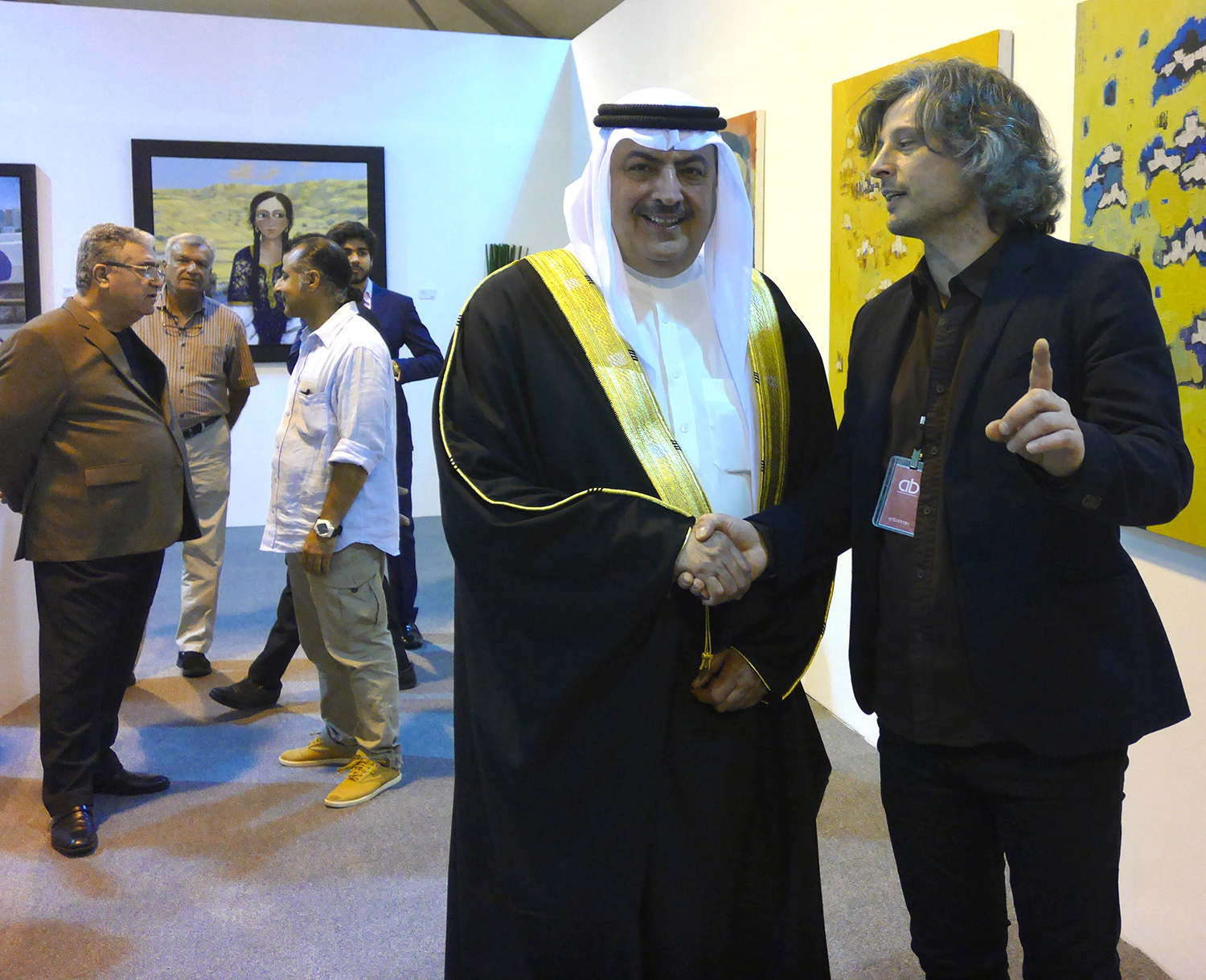
German artist Sebastian Bieniek talking to Rashid bin Khalifa Al Khalifa at the Views Bahrain exhibition in 2016.

Rashid Al Khalifa was born in Riffa in 1952. He is the second son of Sheikh Khalifa bin Hamad Al Khalifa, who was the eighth son of Hamad bin Isa Al Khalifa, the ruler of Bahrain from 1932 until his death in 1942.

Rashid was exposed to literature, philosophy and music in high school. The former Emir, Sheikh Isa bin Salman Al Khalifa, and former Prime Minister, Sheikh Khalifa bin Salman Al Khalifa, both showed interest in Rashid's work when he participated in a local art exhibition at his high school, encouraging his early interest in painting.

Rashid held his first solo exhibition at the Dilmun Hotel, Bahrain, in 1970 when he was 18 years old, and then moved to the UK in 1972 to study at the Hastings College of Arts and Technology in Sussex. After returning to Bahrain in 1978, inspired by Europe's greatest Impressionist masters, he began his own renditions of his country's landscapes, producing a series of atmospheric paintings of the desert, sea, and historical sites. These works were first presented at the Middle East Institute, Washington, D.C., USA, and at the Sheraton Hotel, Bahrain, in 1982. Rashid developed his painting by responding to certain movements and styles such as geometric abstraction, hard-edge painting and colour field work. In 1983, Rashid and a number of other Bahraini artists, formed the Bahrain Arts Society, a non-profit organization for Bahraini artists, whereby Rashid was named its first president. He continues to hold the title of honorary president.

In 2010, an exhibition was held at the Bahrain National of his work, "Convex: A New Perspective". In 2012, he held solo exhibitions at the Bahrain Financial Harbour, Manama, Beirut Art Fair, Lebanon, and Abu Dhabi Art, UAE.

In 2015 he participated in the 56th Venice Biennale, "Eye of the Thunderstorm: Effervescent Practices from the Arab World", in both the ‘Nomi/Names’ joint exhibition and a collateral event, ‘The commissioned by the Contemporary Practices Journal.

In 2018, the artist presented a solo show at Ayyam Gallery in Dubai, UAE, "Hybrids", and a solo exhibition, "Penumbra: Textured Shadow, Coloured Light", at the Saatchi Gallery in London. In 2020, Rizzoli publishing house released an illustrated publication of Rashid Al Khalifa's work, Rashid Al Khalifa, Full Circle.

Rashid held a government post as the Undersecretary for Tourism and Archaeology for the Ministry of Culture, Bahrain until June 2011. After the first Gulf War, he was appointed Undersecretary of Immigration, Passports and Residence Affairs. In 2021 he retired from this position and has since been named the chairman of the newly established National Council for Arts. Al Khalifa is married to Luluwah bint Khalifa bin Salman Al Khalifa, thevonly daughter of Khalifa bin Salman, former Prime Minister of Bahrain. They have six children, three daughters and three sons.

== Exhibitions ==
=== Solo ===
2021 Opera Gallery, Dubai, UAE

2021 Tesselate, Mario Mauroner Contemporary Art, Vienna, Austria

2019 In Parallel, Bait Muzna Gallery, Muscat, Oman

2018 Penumbra: Textured Shadow, Coloured Light, Saatchi Gallery, London, UK

Hybrids, Ayyam Gallery, Alserkal Avenue, Dubai, UAE

2012 Reflections, The Waterline Gallery, Bahrain Financial Harbour, Kingdom of Bahrain

2010 Convex: A New Perspective, Bahrain National Museum, Kingdom of Bahrain

1997 Art Department, Shuman Arts Organization, Amman, Jordan

1996 De Caliet Gallery, Milan, Italy

El Kato Kayyel Gallery, Milan, Italy

1982 Middle East Institute, Washington, D.C., USA

Sheraton Hotel, Manama, Kingdom of Bahrain

1970 Dilmun Hotel, Manama, Kingdom of Bahrain

=== Biennals ===
2019 Moscow Biennale, New Tretyakov Gallery, Moscow, Russia

2017 Bridges, Grenada Pavilion, 57th Venice Biennale, Italy

Out of Place, 3rd Mediterranean Biennale, Sakhnin Valley, Israel

2015 Arab Delegation, TRIO Biennial, Rio de Janeiro, Brazil

Nomi/Names Official Exhibition, 56th Venice Biennale, Italy

The Eye of the Thunderstorm: Effervescent Practices from the Arab World,

Official Collateral Event, 56th Venice Biennale, Italy

=== Bahrain Arts Society Participation ===
2016 15/15, Shaikh Ebrahim bin Mohammed Al Khalifa Center for Culture and Heritage,

Muharraq, Kingdom of Bahrain

Views, Ritz Carlton, Kingdom of Bahrain

2014 Bahrain, Asilah Arts & Culture Forum, Morocco

2013 Bahrain Contemporary Art, Russian Academy, Moscow, Russia

1996 Europe Art Festival, Geneva, Switzerland

Bahrain Artists Exhibition, Rome, Italy

Sharjah Biennial, UAE

1995 Hotel Du Rond, Geneva, Switzerland

World Trade Center, Lausanne, Switzerland

1989 Bahrain Arts Society Exhibition, Cairo, Egypt

1988 Festival of Asian Artists, Malaysia

New Art Center, Baghdad, Iraq

1986 First GCC Art Exhibition, Tokyo, Japan

1985 Cairo Biennial, Egypt

Alia Center, Amman, Jordan

1984 Bahraini Artists, Leighton House, London, England

Salon des Artistes Français, Grand Palais, Paris, France

2007 Bahrain Contemporary Art, UNESCO, Paris, France

2005 Modern Art Exhibition, Royal Ireland College of Surgeons, Dublin, Ireland

2004 32nd Annual Art Exhibition, Bahrain National Museum, Kingdom of Bahrain

2002 Bahrain Culture Week, Amman, Jordan

Bahrain Culture Week, Peking, China

1999 Taipei Art Exhibition, Taipei, Taiwan

Sharjah Biennial, Sharjah, UAE

Dilmun Exhibition, Paris, France

1998 Bahrain Arts Society Exhibition, Gallery Alexander, Ladoux, France

1997 Art Expo Singapore, Singapore

Art America Exhibition, Miami, USA

Europe Art Festival, Geneva, Switzerland

Bahrain Arts Society Exhibition, Cannes, France

== Honours and awards ==
=== Honours ===
==== Foreign honours ====
- (Anhalt) Anhaltese Ducal Family: Knight Grand Cross of the Ducal Order of Albert the Bear

=== Awards ===
- 1991 GCC Golden Palm Award Doha
- 1989 GCC Dana Award Kuwait
