= Chief Public Prosecutor (BES Islands) =

The Ministry of Justice and Security of the Netherlands oversees the heads of the Public Prosecution Service in the BES islands (Bonaire, Saba, and Sint Eustatius). The Public Prosecutor typically leads the investigation in a criminal matter, and the Public Prosecution Service ensures that the sentences given by the judges are properly executed. In addition, the service monitors any fines and penalties, the imprisonment process, and any required community service.

In turn, the Public Prosecution Service BES is responsible for the criminal enforcement of the legal order on Bonaire, Saba, and Sint Eustatius. Each island has an independent Public Prosecution Office that contains a Public Prosecutor—all of whom are under the leadership of a Chief Prosecutor.

The Public Prosecution Service overall works in tandem with a joint Attorney General and Advocate General.

== List of chief public prosecutors ==
This list begins in 2010, after each country in the BES islands was incorporated into the Netherlands.

- David van Delft (2010-2014)
- Henry Hambeukers (2014-2018)
- Bote ter Steege (2018-2020)
- Marian Veneberg (2020-present)

== See also ==
- Dutch Caribbean Police Force
- Justice ministry
- Ministry of Justice and Security
