= Public Ministry of Nicaragua =

The Public Ministry of Nicaragua is the Nicaraguan federal public prosecutor's office. It was established in 2000 to ensure effective criminal prosecution by investigating and prosecuting offenders of the law that violate public order and security. It is an independent institution that operates independently and is subordinated only to the Constitution of Nicaragua and the laws. The Attorney General of the Republic heads the ministry.

== Corruption in the Public Ministry ==
Although established as an independent institution, the Public Ministry of Nicaragua has faced criticism regarding its role in law enforcement and governance. Law 346 affirms its autonomy, stating that it must operate without subordination to any state power (Article 6). However, various reports have raised concerns about its effectiveness and impartiality. The Office of the Prosecutor, responsible for investigating and prosecuting crimes, has been accused of inaction and selective enforcement. In 2008, the U.S. Department of State reported that "Public Ministry officials, some judges, and law enforcement authorities did not provide appropriate treatment to trafficking victims." In 2021, the U.S. Department of the Treasury sanctioned the Public Ministry, citing its involvement in politically motivated prosecutions and actions that undermined democratic processes. Reports by international human rights experts have also linked the ministry to the detention and investigation of presidential candidates, which prevented them from participating in elections.

== Public Ministry since 2018 ==
Since the outbreak of political unrest in 2018, sparked by protests against proposed social security reforms and broader government policies, criticism of the Public Ministry has intensified, particularly regarding its role in Daniel Ortega's administration. The protests, which escalated into a broader anti-government movement, were met with a violent crackdown by security forces, leading to allegations of human rights violations. Following these events, the Public Ministry was tasked with investigating deaths and injuries among students, police, and civilians, as well as incidents of theft affecting individuals and businesses, and damage to both public and private property. International organizations, such as the Inter-American Commission on Human Rights, were "informed about the absence of due diligence by the National Police and the Public Ministry in the investigation into the criminal incidents committed in the protests, especially against protesters and government opponents." Incidents such as the killing of journalist Ángel Gahona have raised serious concerns. Gahona was killed on April 21, 2018, while reporting on the protests. However, the Public Ministry failed to detain or investigate any National Police or paramilitary members present at the scene, sparking public outrage. Instead, two civilians, Brandon Lovo (18) and Glen Slate (21), were accused and convicted in a closed judicial hearing. Notably, none of the prosecution's 36 witnesses placed the accused at the crime scene. The investigation also concluded that the murder weapon was homemade, despite the defense's technical expert arguing that such a weapon could not have achieved such accuracy; the judge excluded this testimony at the trial. Furthermore, the weapon presented as evidence lacked fingerprints and gunshot residue, raising further doubts about the prosecution's case. Incidents such as this have raised serious concerns, as authorities failed to explore all possible leads and conducted a criminal investigation filled with procedural irregularities.

Independent experts in human rights, law, and forensic investigation, who were part of the Grupo Interdisciplinario de Expertos Independientes (GIEI) and analyzed the violence and human rights violations in Nicaragua between April 18 and May 30, 2018, have accused the Public Ministry of lacking oversight and failing to investigate the violence against the 2018 protesters properly. These experts charged the Public Ministry with contributing to a system of impunity for human rights violations committed during and after the 2018 protests. Specifically, they accused the institution of not pursuing cases against members of the National Police or government-affiliated groups, despite victims' families filing complaints and presenting evidence. Additionally, the experts raised concerns about the Public Ministry's independence, alleging that it prosecuted government opponents while avoiding investigations into state actors. In response to this investigation, the State of Nicaragua stated that, "[t]he Report is an echo of the groups that attempted the coup d'état, as well as the voices and interventionist actions of the IACHR, MESENI, GIEI and Working Group of the Permanent Council of the OAS, who have had as sources NGOs, media, videos, and others, that evidently oppose the Government of Reconciliation and National Unity, with the main objective of bringing sanctions to the people and Government of Nicaragua."

The accusations of corruption within the ministry have also led to increased calls and proposals to reform the Public Ministry. María Asunción Moreno (constitutional lawyer), Úrsula Indacochea (judicial independence specialist from the Due Process Foundation), and Alexander Rodríguez (expert on public ministry reforms) outlined a roadmap for reform in a webinar organized by Expediente Público, a media outlet. Their proposal recommends removing prosecutors who planned and carried out acts of legal persecution against opponents, citizens, or journalists, starting in April 2018, and prohibiting the future appointment of retired police and military personnel as prosecutors. Additionally, they suggest that the election of the Attorney General must be free from political influence, ensuring transparency and accountability. The numerous investigations into the 2018 protests and their suppression have prompted further scrutiny of various branches of the Nicaraguan government, leading to increased calls for institutional reform, including the Public Ministry.

== Role of the Attorney General ==
=== Ana Julia Guido Ochoa ===
Ana Julia's tenure as head of the Public Ministry has been marked by decisions aligning with the national government's political interests. She was the attorney general and head of the Public Ministry during the 2018 protests and authorized charges of terrorism and organized crime against individuals involved in the demonstrations. She effectively eliminated open selection processes for Public Ministry representatives, instead holding internal competitions that favored individuals with ties to the Sandinista National Liberation Front (FSLN). After she was appointed Attorney General, she oversaw the reassignment of prosecutors not affiliated with the ruling party.

=== Wendy Carolina Morales Urbina ===
Morales was appointed to the role of Attorney General on May 10, 2019, by President Ortega. She has also faced criticism for her loyalty to the Ortega-Murillo regime. Morales was sanctioned by the U.S. Department of the Treasury in 2022 for her involvement in politically motivated prosecutions and actions that undermined democratic processes. According to the sanction, she played a key role in using the Public Ministry to target political opponents, including journalists and opposition leaders, as part of the Ortega government's strategy to suppress dissent. In addition to prosecuting opposition figures, Morales was also involved in the confiscation of property from political opponents, often under dubious legal pretenses, as part of efforts to weaken the opposition and consolidate government control.

== List of attorneys general (2000–present) ==
- Julio Centeno Gomez (2000–2001)
- Óscar Herdocia Lacayo (2002–2004)
- Víctor Manuel Talavera (2004–2007)
- Hernan Estrada Santamaria (2007–2018)
- Ana Julia Guido Ochoa (2014–2019)
- Wendy Carolina Morales Urbina (2019–present)

== See also ==
- Attorneys general
- Justice ministry
- Politics of Nicaragua
