= Ministry of Justice, Immigration and National Security (Dominica) =

Government ministry of Dominica

The Ministry of Justice, Immigration and National Security of Dominica provides legal advice and representation to the federal government and its departments, as well as administers justice, protects intellectual property rights, and ensures that financial crimes are properly analyzed and investigated. The divisions of the ministry include the following:

- Chambers of the Attorney General
- Commonwealth of Dominica Police Force
- Companies and Intellectual Property Office
- Division of Labour
- Dominica Prison Service
- Financial Intelligence Unit (FIU)
- Fire and Ambulance Services Division
- Immigration Division
- Legal Aid Clinic
- Magistrates' Court
- Office of Disaster Management (ODM)
- Office of the Director of Public Prosecutions (DPP)
- Registry Division

== List of ministers ==
=== Minister of Legal Affairs ===
- Ronan David before 1980 and after 1985 [he simultaneously served as the Attorney General]

=== Minister of Legal Affairs, Immigration & Labor ===
- Brian Alleyne (1986–1990) [he simultaneously served as the Attorney General]

=== Minister of Legal Affairs, Information & Public Relations ===
- Jenner Armour (1991–1995) [he simultaneously served as the Attorney General]

=== Minister of Legal Affairs and Labor ===
- Edison James (1996–2000)

=== Minister of Legal Affairs ===
- Pierre Charles (2001–2002)
- David Bruney (2002–2004)

=== Minister of Legal Affairs, Labor & Immigration ===
- Henry Dyer (2004–2005)
- Ian Douglas (2005–2007) [he simultaneously served as the Attorney General]

=== Minister of Tourism, Legal Affairs & Civil Aviation ===
- Ian Douglas (2008–2014)

=== Minister of Justice, Immigration and National Security ===
- Rayburn Blackmoore (2014–present)*

*Blackmoore served as Minister of National Security, Labor & Immigration from 2007 to 2008; Charles Savarin served as Minister of National Security, Labor, & Immigration from 2008 to 2013; Roosevelt Skerrit served as Minister of National Security, Labor, & Immigration from 2013 to 2014.

== See also ==
- Justice ministry
- Politics of Dominica
