= Nawaf bin Mohammed Al-Mawadah =

Minister of Justice, Islamic Affairs and Endowments
- Incumbent
- Assumed office 13 June 2022
- Preceded by: Khalid bin Ali Al Khalifa

Nawaf bin Mohammed Al-Mawadah is a Bahraini politician serving as Minister of Justice, Islamic Affairs and Endowments.

== Biography ==
In 2022, he was appointed to the Cabinet of Bahrain as Minister of Justice, Islamic Affairs and Endowments. He was previously the Ombudsman at the Ministry of Interior from 2012 to 2022 and the Chairman of the Prisoners and Detainees Rights Commission from 2013 to 2022. In 2025, he attended the funeral of Pope Francis.
