= Ministry of Justice (Niue) =

The Ministry of Justice is a ministry of the government of Niue.

Per the Niue Constitution Act of 1974, the Minister of Justice provided advice to the Governor-General regarding the selection of Judges of the High Court. As of 2008, the ministry went by the name Ministry of Justice, Lands and Survey. Based on the government's website in 2018, the justice affairs appear to have merged with the Ministry of Social Services—as there is no separate section for the Ministry of Justice. As of 2018, records show Darren Tohovaka as the Acting Secretary of Justice.

== List of ministers ==
- Enetama Lipitoa (1985-1990)
- Young Vivian (1990-1992)
- Frank Lui (1993-1996)
- Togia Sioneholo (2008-2011) [referred to as the Minister of Justice, Lands and Survey]
- Halene Magatogia (2011-2014) [referred to as the Minister of Justice, Lands and Survey]

== See also ==
- Justice ministry
- Politics of Niue
