= Ministry of Justice (Liechtenstein) =

According to their official website, the Ministry of Foreign Affairs, Justice and Culture of Liechtenstein unites three complementary policy areas. For instance, the foreign policy tasks involve maintaining the independence of the country and handling policies that pertain to foreign economics, human rights, and international solidarity. The justice sector of the ministry handles civil law, criminal law, penal system, victim assistance, coordination of official liability, basic traffic and land valuation. Lastly, cultural policy means addressing Liechtenstein's national identity by way of institutions such as museums and the state library.

== List of ministers (1990-present) ==
- Herbert Wille (1990–1993) [referred to as the Government Councillor for Justice]
- Mario Frick (1994–1998) [referred to as the Government Councillor for Justice]
- Heinz Frommelt (1998–2001) [referred to as the Government Councillor for Justice]
- Rita Kieber-Beck (2001–2005) [referred to as the Government Councillor for Justice and then later the Minister of Justice]
- Klaus Tschuetscher (2005–2009)
- Aurelia Frick (2009–present)

== See also ==
- Justice ministry
- Politics of Liechtenstein
