= Minister of Justice (Madagascar) =

This is a complete list of the Ministers of Justice in Madagascar:

- Marcel Fournier (1958-1960) [1st Minister of Justice]
- Alfred Ramangasoavina (1960-1970)
- Jean-Francois Jarison (1970-1971)
- Jacques Andrianada (1972-1975)
- Georges Thomas Indrianjafy (1976-1982)
- Sambson Gilbert (1982-1988)
- Joseph Bedo (1988-1991)
- Armand Rajaonarivelo (1992-1993)
- Charles Rabetokotany (1994-1995)
- Rabendrainy Ramanoelison (1995-1996)
- Houssen Abdallah (1996-1997)
- Anaclet Imbiki (1997-2002)
- Alice Rajaonah (2002-2004) [1st female Minister of Justice]
- Lala Henriette Ratsiharovala (2004-2007)
- Bakolalao Ramanandraibe Ranaivoharivony (2007-2009)
- Christine Razanamahasoa (2009-2013)
- Noëline Ramanantenasoa (2014-2016)
- Charles Andriamiseza (2016-2017)
- Elise Alexandrine Rasolo (2017-2018)
- Harimisa Noro Vololona (2018-2019)
- Jacques Randrianasolo(2019-2020)
- Johnny Richard Andriamahefarivo (2020-2021)
- Imbiki Herilaza(2021-2022)
- François Rakotozafy(2022-2023)
- Randriamanantenasoa Landy Mbolatiana(2023-2024)
- Justice ministry
