= Gretta Roberts =

Dominican educator and politician

Gretta Roberts, sometimes spelled Greta Roberts, is a Dominican educator and politician. She is currently a member of the Cabinet of Dominica, serving as minister of culture, youth, sports, and community development.

== Biography ==
Roberts was born in Grand Fond, a constituency in southeastern Dominica. Her mother, Gertrude Roberts, was a politician and member of the House of Assembly of Dominica who later served as minister for community development and women's affairs. Roberts attended Grand Fond Primary School and then moved to the Convent High School. She briefly left the island and stayed on Saint Vincent after Hurricane David in 1979, before returning to Dominica and graduating from Dominica Grammar School.

She began working as a teacher in 1980, eventually becoming principal of Goodwill Primary School in Roseau, where she taught for 15 years. In 2014, during her time as principal of Roseau Primary School, she was named Primary School Principal of the Year at the country's National Excellence in Education Awards. She was transferred back to Goodwill in 2017 before retiring from education.

In July 2018, she became secretary-general of the local branch of UNESCO.

In the 2019 Dominican general election, Roberts was elected as a member of the Dominica Labour Party to represent Morne Jaune/Riviere Cyrique—her mother's former constituency—in the House of Assembly. She replaced two-term DLP representative Ivor Stephenson, who was retiring.

Roberts previously served as minister of governance, public service reform, citizen empowerment, social justice, and ecclesiastical affairs under Prime Minister Roosevelt Skerrit. Since the snap elections in 2022, she has held the culture, youth, sports, and community development portfolio.
