= Secretariat of Justice (San Marino) =

The Secretariat of State for Justice, Information & Research of San Marino (or Ministry of Justice) implements the policies concerning justice set out in the government program. In particular, the ministry has the following duties:

- Supervise the work of the court’s Judicial Offices by issuing orders and directives to improve their organisation and ensure their proper functioning
- Supervise the operation of the State prison through the Gendarmerie, which is responsible for managing the facility and the inmates.
- Monitor professional associations
- Submit draft laws and decisions in the field of justice to the Congress of State

== List of secretariats ==
=== Secretariat of Justice, Relations with Local Governments, & Information ===
- Pier Marino Menicucci (2001-2002)
- Tito Masi (2002)

=== Secretariat of Justice, Relations with Local Governments, & Information ===
- Alberto Cecchetti (2003-2006)

=== Secretariat of Justice, Information & Peace ===
- Ivan Foschi (2006-2010)

=== Secretariat of Justice, Information & Research ===
- Augusto Casali (2010-present)

== See also ==
- Justice ministry
- Politics of San Marino
