= Gudaibiya =

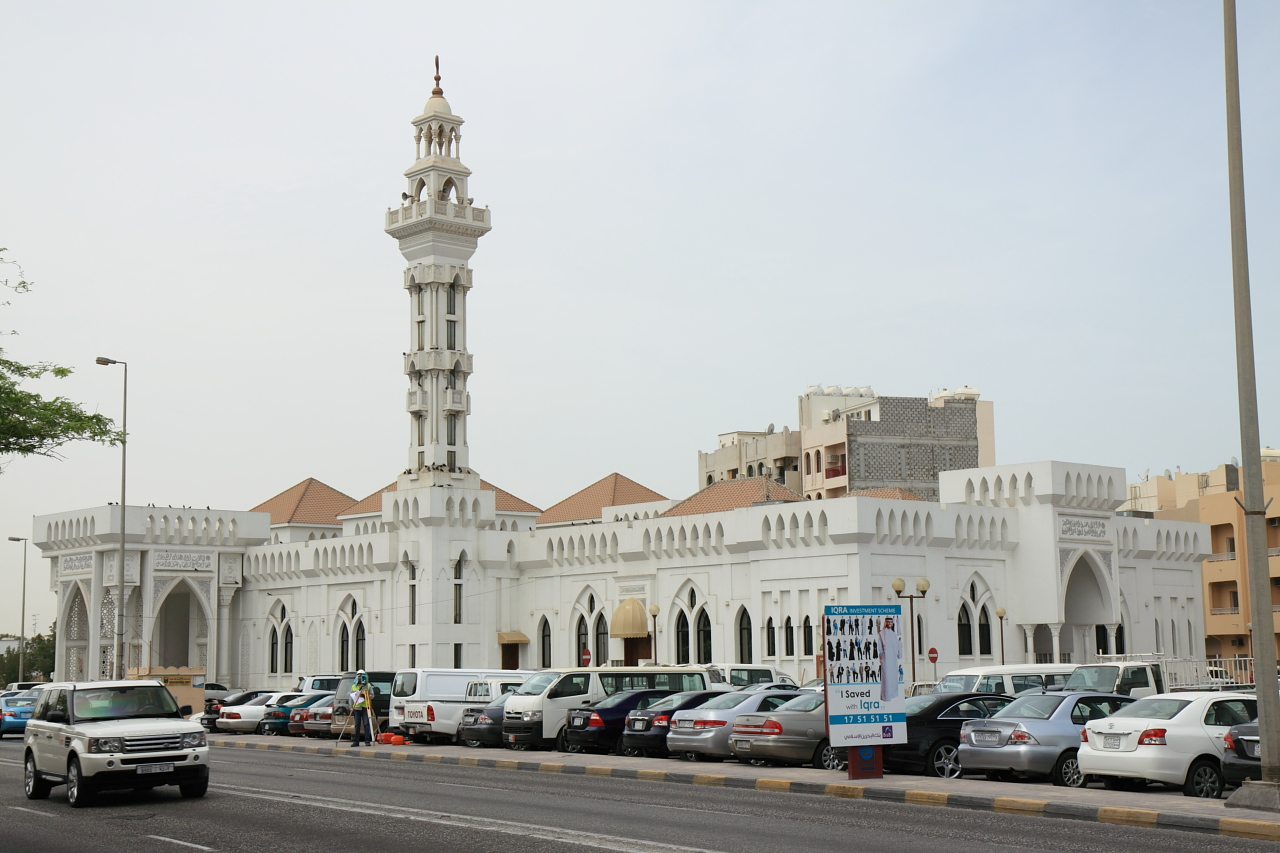
Gudaibiya mosque

Gudaibiya (Qudaibiya) is a neighbourhood located in Manama, the capital city of Bahrain.

An older part of the city, yet a busy area, Gudaibiya is a bustling and highly cosmopolitan area, home to many new arrivals in the Kingdom. Gudaibiya houses embassies and the National Assembly (Bahrain). It has large numbers of Indian, Filipino, Ethiopian and Pakistani residents. It is the site of the Ebrahim Al-Arrayedh Poetry House, a leading cultural centre, which is the house of the late Bahraini poet, Ebrahim Al-Arrayedh. It contains the Al-Qudaibiya Palace.
