= Bakolalao Ramanandraibe Ranaivoharivony =

Minister of Justice in Madagascar

Bakolalao Ramanandraibe Ranaivoharivony was Minister of Justice of Madagascar from October 2007 to 2009.

In 2006 she was director general of the École Nationale de la Magistrature et des Greffes.

She is honorary president of the Cour de Cassation and the Supreme Court.
