= Ministry of justice =

Government agency in charge of justice

A justice ministry, ministry of justice, or department of justice, is a ministry or other government agency in charge of the administration of justice. The ministry or department is often headed by a minister of justice (minister for justice in a very few countries) or a secretary of justice. In some countries, the head of the department may be called the attorney general, for example in the United States.

Depending on the country, specific duties may relate to organizing the justice system, overseeing the public prosecutor and national investigative agencies (e.g. the American Federal Bureau of Investigation), and maintaining the legal system and public order. Some ministries have additional responsibilities in related policy areas such as overseeing elections, directing the police, law reform, and administration of the immigration and citizenship services. Some nations separate the duties of the ministry of justice from responsibility for the prosecution of criminal cases, such that the duties of an attorney general or similar officer reside in a separate office. Sometimes the prison system is separated into another government department called Corrective Services.

Monaco is an example of a country that does not have a ministry of justice, but rather a Directorate of Judicial Services (head: Secretary of Justice) that oversees the administration of justice. Vatican City, a country under the sovereignty of the Holy See, also does not possess a ministry of justice. Instead, the Governorate of Vatican City State (head: President of the Governorate of Vatican City State), the legislative body of the Vatican, includes a legal office.

== Related articles and lists ==
Country, State or Territory	Subnational division	Ministry	Head	List
Afghanistan		Ministry of Justice	Minister of Justice	list
Albania		Ministry of Justice	Minister of Justice	list
Algeria		Ministry of Justice	Minister of Justice	list
Andorra		Ministry of Social Affairs, Justice and Interior of Andorra	Minister of Social Affairs, Justice and Interior	list
Angola		Ministry of Justice and Human Rights	Minister of Justice and Human Rights	list
Anguilla		Attorney General's Chambers	Attorney General	list
Antigua and Barbuda		Ministry of Justice and Legal Affairs	Attorney General and Minister of Justice and Legal Affairs	list
Argentina		Ministry of Justice and Human Rights	Minister of Justice and Human Rights	list
Armenia		Ministry of Justice	Minister of Justice	list
Australia		Attorney General's Department	Attorney General of Australia	list
	Australian Capital Territory	Justice and Community Safety Directorate	Attorney General	list
	New South Wales	Department of Attorney General and Justice	Attorney General	list
	New South Wales	Department of Attorney General and Justice	Minister of Justice	list
	Norfolk Island	Attorney General	Chief Minister	
	Northern Territory	Department of Justice and Attorney General	Attorney General and Minister of Justice	list
	Queensland	Department of Justice and Attorney General	Attorney General of Queensland	list
	South Australia	Department of the Attorney General	Attorney General	list
	Tasmania	Department of Justice and the Attorney General	Attorney General and Minister of Justice	list
	Victoria	Department of Justice and Community Safety	Attorney-General	list
	Victoria	Department of Justice and Community Safety	Minister for Corrections	list
	Western Australia	Department of Justice	Attorney General	list
Austria		Ministry of Justice	Minister of Justice	list
Azerbaijan		Ministry of Justice	Minister of Justice	list
Bahamas		Office of the Attorney General and Ministry of Legal Affairs (Bahamas)	Attorney General and Minister of Legal Affairs	list
Bahrain		Ministry of Justice	Minister of Justice	list
Bangladesh		Ministry of Law, Justice and Parliamentary Affairs	Minister of Law, Justice and Parliamentary Affairs	list
Barbados		Office of the Attorney General and Ministry of Legal Affairs	Attorney General	list
Belarus		Ministry of Justice of the Republic of Belarus	Minister of Justice	list
Belgium		Federal Public Service Justice	Minister of Justice	list
Belize		Ministry of the Attorney General Office	Attorney General	list
Benin		Ministry of Justice	Minister of Justice	list
Bermuda		Attorney General's Chambers	Attorney General and Minister of Legal Affairs	list
Bhutan		Office of the Attorney General	Attorney General	list
Bolivia		Ministry of Justice and Institutional Transparency	Minister of Justice and Institutional Transparency	list
Bosnia and Herzegovina		Ministry of Justice	Minister of Justice	list
Botswana		Ministry of Defence, Justice and Security	Minister of Defence, Justice and Security	list
Brazil		Ministry of Justice and Public Security	Minister of Justice and Public Security	list
Brazil		Attorneyship General of the Union	Attorney General	list
British Virgin Islands		Department of Justice	Attorney General	list
Brunei		Office of the Attorney General	Attorney General	list
Bulgaria		Ministry of Justice	Minister of Justice	list
Burkina Faso		Ministry of Justice	Minister of Justice	list
Burundi		Ministry of Justice	Minister of Justice	list
Cambodia		Ministry of Justice	Minister of Justice	list
Cameroon		Ministry of Justice	Minister of State for Justice	list
Canada		Department of Justice	Minister of Justice and Attorney General of Canada	list
	Alberta	Ministry of Justice and Attorney General	Attorney General and Minister of Justice	list
	British Columbia	Ministry of Justice	Attorney General and Minister of Justice	list
	Manitoba	Department of Justice (Manitoba)	Attorney General and Minister of Justice	list
	New Brunswick	Department of Justice (New Brunswick)	Attorney General and Minister of Justice	list
	Newfoundland and Labrador	Department of Justice and Public Safety	Attorney General and Minister of Justice and Public Safety	
	Northwest Territories	Department of Justice	Minister of Justice	
	Nova Scotia	Department of Justice	Attorney General and Minister of Justice and Public Safety	
	Nunavut	Department of Justice	Minister of Justice	
	Ontario	Ministry of the Attorney General	Attorney General	list
	Prince Edward Island	Department of Justice and Public Safety	Attorney General and Minister of Justice and Public Safety	
	Quebec	Ministry of Justice	Minister of Justice (Quebec)	list
	Saskatchewan	Ministry of Justice	Attorney General and Minister of Justice	
	Yukon	Department of Justice	Minister of Justice	
Cape Verde		Ministry of Justice and Labor	Minister of Justice and Labor	list
Cayman Islands		Office of Director of Public Prosecutions	Director of Public Prosecutions	list
Central African Republic		Ministry of Justice and Human Rights	Minister of Justice and Human Rights	list
Chad		Ministry of Justice	Minister of Justice	list
Chile		Ministry of Justice and Human Rights	Minister of Justice and Human Rights	list
China		Ministry of Justice	Minister of Justice	list
China		Supreme People's Procuratorate	Procurator-General	list
	Hong Kong	Department of Justice	Secretary for Justice	list
	Macau	Secretariat for Administration and Justice	Secretary for Administration and Justice	list
Republic of China (Taiwan)		Ministry of Justice	Minister of Justice	list
Colombia		Ministry of Justice and Law	Minister of Justice and Law	list
Comoros		Ministry of Justice, Islamic Affairs, Public Administration and Human Rights	Minister of Justice, Islamic Affairs, Public Administration and Human Rights	list
Cook Islands		Ministry of Justice	Minister of Justice	list
Costa Rica		Ministry of Justice and Peace	Minister of Justice and Peace	list
Croatia		Ministry of Justice	Minister of Justice	list
Cuba		Ministry of Justice	Minister of Justice	list
Cyprus		Ministry of Justice and Public Order	Minister of Justice and Public Order	list
Czech Republic		Ministry of Justice	Minister of Justice	list
Democratic Republic of Congo		Ministry of Justice and Human Rights	Minister of Justice and Human Rights	list
Denmark		Ministry of Justice	Minister of Justice	list
Djibouti		Ministry of Justice and Penal Affairs	Minister of Justice and Penal Affairs	list
Dominica		Ministry of Justice, Immigration and National Security	Minister of Justice, Immigration and National Security	list
Dominican Republic		Attorney General of the Republic (Dominican Republic)	Attorney General	list
Ecuador		Ministry of Justice, Human Rights and Cults	Minister of Justice, Human Rights and Cults	list
Egypt		Ministry of Justice	Minister of Justice	list
El Salvador		Public Ministry	Attorney General	list
Equatorial Guinea		Ministry of Justice, Worship and Penitentiary Institutions	Minister of Justice, Worship and Penitentiary Institutions	list
Eritrea		Ministry of Justice	Minister of Justice	list
Estonia		Ministry of Justice	Minister of Justice	list
Ethiopia		Federal Attorney General's Office	Federal Attorney General	list
European Union		Directorate-General for Justice and Consumers	Commissioner for Justice, Fundamental Rights and Citizenship	list
Faroe Islands		Ministry of Internal Affairs	Minister of Internal Affairs	list
Fiji		Office of the Attorney General	Attorney General and Minister of Justice	list
Finland		Ministry of Justice	Minister of Justice	list
France		Ministry of Justice	Minister of Justice	list
Gabon		Ministry of Justice	Minister of Justice	list
Gambia		Ministry of Justice	Minister for Justice	list
Georgia		Ministry of Justice	Minister of Justice	list
	Abkhazia	Ministry of Justice	Minister of Justice	list
	South Ossetia	Ministry of Justice	Minister of Justice	list
Germany		Federal Ministry of Justice	Federal Minister of Justice	list
	Baden-Württemberg	Ministry of Justice and Migration	Minister of Justice and Migration	
	Bavaria	State Ministry of Justice	State Minister of Justice	
	Berlin	Senate Department for Justice and Consumer Protection	Senator for Justice and Consumer Protection	
	Brandenburg	Ministry of Justice	Minister of Justice	
	Bremen	Senator for Justice and the Constitution	Senator for Justice and the Constitution	
	Hamburg	Office for Justice and Consumer Protection	Senator for Justice and Consumer Protection	
	Hesse	Ministry of Justice	Minister of Justice	
	Lower Saxony	Ministry of Justice	Minister of Justice	
	Mecklenburg-Vorpommern	Ministry of Justice of Justice, Equality and Consumer Protection	Minister of Justice, Equality, and Consumer Protection	
	North Rhine-Westphalia	Ministry of Justice	Minister of Justice	
	Rhineland-Palatinate	Ministry of Justice	Minister of Justice	
	Saarland	Ministry of Justice	Minister of Justice	
	Saxony	Ministry of Justice and Democracy, Europe, and Equality	Minister of Justice and Democracy, Europe, and Equality	
	Saxony-Anhalt	Ministry of Justice and Consumer Protection	Minister of Justice and Consumer Protection	
	Schleswig-Holstein	Ministry of Justice and Health	Minister of Justice and Health	
	Thuringia	Ministry of Migration, Justice, and Consumer Protection	Minister of Migration, Justice, and Consumer Protection	
Ghana		Ministry of Justice and Attorney General's Department	Attorney General	list
Gibraltar		Office of the Attorney General	Attorney General and Director of Public Prosecution	list
Greece		Ministry of Justice, Transparency and Human Rights	Minister of Justice, Transparency and Human Rights	list
Greenland		Ministry of Justice	Minister of Justice	
Grenada		Office of the Attorney General	Attorney General	list
Guam		Office of the Attorney General	Attorney General	list
Guatemala		Public Ministry	Attorney General	list
Guinea		Ministry of Justice	Minister of Justice	list
Guinea-Bissau		Ministry of Justice	Minister of Justice	list
Guyana		Ministry of Legal Affairs and Attorney General's Chambers	Attorney General and Minister of Legal Affairs	list
Haiti		Ministry of Justice and Public Security	Minister of Justice and Public Security	list
Honduras		Ministry of Human Rights, Justice, Governance and Decentralization	Minister of Human Rights, Justice, Governance and Decentralization	list
Hungary		Ministry of Justice	Minister of Administration and Justice	list
Iceland		Ministry of Justice and Human Rights	Minister of Interior	list
India		Ministry of Law and Justice	Minister of Law and Justice	list
Indonesia		Ministry of Law	Minister of Law	list
Indonesia		Office of the Attorney General	Attorney General	list
Iran		Ministry of Justice	Attorney General and Minister of Justice	list
Iraq		Ministry of Justice	Minister of Justice	list
Ireland		Department of Justice, Home Affairs and Migration	Minister for Justice, Home Affairs and Migration	list
Isle of Man		Attorney General	Ministry of Justice (United Kingdom)	list
Israel		Ministry of Justice	Minister of Justice	list
Italy		Ministry of Justice	Minister of Justice	list
Ivory Coast		Ministry of Justice and Human Rights	Minister of Justice and Human Rights	list
Jamaica		Ministry of Justice	Minister of Justice	list
Japan		Ministry of Justice	Minister of Justice	list
Jordan		Ministry of Justice	Minister of Justice	list
Kazakhstan		Ministry of Justice	Minister of Justice	list
Kenya		Office of the Attorney General and Department of Justice	Attorney General	list
Kiribati		Ministry of Justice	Minister of Justice	list
South Korea		Ministry of Justice	Minister of Justice	list
Kosovo		Ministry of Justice	Minister of Justice	list
Kyrgyzstan		Ministry of Justice	Minister of Justice	list
Kuwait		Ministry of Justice	Minister of Justice	list
Laos		Ministry of Justice	Minister of Justice	list
Latvia		Ministry of Justice	Minister of Justice	list
Lebanon		Ministry of Justice	Minister of Justice	list
Lesotho		Ministry of Justice, Human Rights and Correctional Services	Minister of Justice, Human Rights and Correctional Services	list
Liberia		Ministry of Justice	Minister of Justice; Attorney General	list
Libya		Ministry of Justice	Minister of Justice	list
Liechtenstein		Ministry of Foreign Affairs, Justice and Culture	Minister of Foreign Affairs, Justice and Culture	list
Lithuania		Ministry of Justice	Minister of Justice	list
Luxembourg		Ministry of Justice	Minister of Justice	list
North Macedonia		Ministry of Justice	Minister of Justice	list
Madagascar		Ministry of Justice	Minister of Justice	list
Malawi		Ministry of Justice and Constitutional Affairs	Minister of Justice and Constitutional Affairs	list
Maldives		Attorney General's Office	Attorney General	list
Mali		Ministry of Justice and Human Rights	Minister of Justice and Human Rights	list
Malta		Ministry of Justice	Minister of Justice	list
Marshall Islands		Ministry of Justice, Immigration and Labor	Minister of Justice, Immigration and Labor	list
Mauritania		Ministry of Justice	Minister of Justice	list
Mauritius		Attorney General's Office, Ministry of Justice, Human Rights and Institutional Reforms	Attorney General and Minister of Justice	list
Mexico		Office of the Attorney General	Attorney General	list
Micronesia		Department of Justice	Secretary of Justice	list
Moldova		Ministry of Justice	Minister of Justice	list
	Transnistria	Ministry of Justice	Minister of Justice	list
Mongolia		Ministry of Justice and Internal Affairs	Minister of Justice and Internal Affairs	list
Montenegro		Ministry of Justice	Minister of Justice	list
Montserrat		Office of the Attorney General	Attorney General	list
Morocco		Ministry of Justice	Minister of Justice	list
	Sahrawi Arab Democratic Republic	Ministry of Justice and Religious Affairs	Minister of Justice and Religious Affairs	list
Mozambique		Ministry of Justice, Constitutional and Religious Affairs	Minister of Justice, Constitutional and Religious Affairs	list
Myanmar		Office of the Attorney General	Attorney General	list
Namibia		Ministry of Justice	Attorney General and Minister of Justice	list
Nauru		Ministry of Justice and Border Control	Minister of Justice and Border Control (Nauru)	list
Nepal		Ministry of Law, Justice and Parliamentary Affairs	Minister of Law, Justice and Parliamentary Affairs	list
Netherlands		Ministry of Justice and Security	Minister of Justice and Security	list
	Bonaire	Public Prosecution Service	Attorney General	list
	Saba	Public Prosecution Service	Attorney General	list
	Sint Eustatius	Public Prosecution Service	Attorney General	list
	Aruba	Ministry of Justice, Security and Integration	Minister of Justice, Security and Integration	list
	Curaçao	Ministry of Justice	Minister of Justice	list
	Sint Maarten	Ministry of Justice	Minister of Justice	list
New Zealand		Ministry of Justice	Minister of Justice	list
Nicaragua		Public Ministry	Attorney General	list
Niger		Ministry of Justice	Minister of Justice	list
Nigeria		Ministry of Justice	Attorney General of the Federation and Minister of the Federal Republic of Nigeria	list
Niue		Justice Department (formerly Ministry of Justice)	Secretary of Justice (Ministry of Social Services)	list
Norway		Ministry of Justice and Public Security	Minister of Justice and Public Security	list
Oman		Ministry of Justice	Minister of Justice	list
Pakistan		Ministry of Law, Justice and Human Rights	Minister for Law, Justice and Human Rights	list
Palau		Ministry of Justice	Minister of Justice	list
Palestine		Ministry of Justice	Minister of Justice	list
Panama		Ministry of Government (formerly Ministry of Government and Justice)	Minister of Government	list
Papua New Guinea		Department of Justice and Attorney General	Attorney General and Minister of Justice	list
Paraguay		Ministry of Justice	Minister of Justice	list
Peru		Ministry of Justice	Minister of Justice	list
Philippines		Department of Justice	Secretary of Justice	list
Poland		Ministry of Justice	Minister of Justice	list
Portugal		Ministry of Justice	Minister of Justice	list
Qatar		Ministry of Justice	Minister of Justice	list
Republic of Congo		Ministry of Justice	Minister of Justice	list
Romania		Ministry of Justice	Minister of Justice	list
Russia		Ministry of Justice	Minister of Justice	list
Russia		General Prosecutor's Office	Prosecutor-General	list
	Crimea	Prosecutor General's Office	Prosecutor General	list
Rwanda		Ministry of Justice	Minister of Justice	list
Saint Kitts and Nevis		Ministry of the Attorney General, Justice and Legal Affairs and Communications	Attorney General	list
Saint Lucia		Ministry of Legal Affairs	Minister of Legal Affairs	list
Saint Vincent and the Grenadines		Ministry of Legal Affairs	Minister of Legal Affairs	list
Samoa		Ministry of Justice and Courts Administration	Minister of Justice and Courts Administration	list
San Marino		Department of Institutional Affairs and Justice	Secretariat of State for Justice, Information and Research	list
São Tomé and Príncipe		Ministry of Justice, Internal Administration and Human Rights	Minister of Justice, Public Administration and Human Rights	list
Saudi Arabia		Ministry of Justice	Minister of Justice	list
Senegal		Ministry of Justice	Minister of Justice	list
Serbia		Ministry of Justice	Minister of Justice	list
Seychelles		Department of Legal Affairs	Attorney General	list
Sierra Leone		Office of the Attorney General and Ministry of Justice	Attorney General and Minister of Justice	list
Singapore		Attorney-General's Chambers; Ministry of Law	Attorney-General; Minister of Law	list list
Slovakia		Ministry of Justice	Minister of Justice	list
Slovenia		Ministry of Justice	Minister of Justice	list
Solomon Islands		Ministry of Justice and Legal Affairs	Minister of Justice and Legal Affairs	list
Somalia		Ministry of Justice	Minister of Justice	list
	Puntland	Ministry of Justice	Minister of Justice	list
	Somaliland	Ministry of Justice	Minister of Justice	list
South Africa		Department of Justice and Constitutional Development	Minister of Justice and Constitutional Development	list
South Sudan		Ministry of Justice	Minister of Justice	list
Spain		Ministry of the Presidency, Justice and Relations with the Parliament	list	
Sri Lanka		Ministry of Justice and Legal Reform	Minister of Justice	list
Sudan		Ministry of Justice	Minister of Justice	list
Suriname		Ministry of Justice and Police	Minister of Justice and Police	list
Swaziland (Eswatini)		Ministry of Justice and Constitutional Affairs	Minister of Justice and Constitutional Affairs	list
Sweden		Ministry of Justice	Minister for Justice	list
Switzerland		Federal Department of Justice and Police	Head of the Federal Department of Justice and Police	list
Syria		Ministry of Justice	Minister of Justice	list
Tajikistan		Ministry of Justice	Minister of Justice	list
Tanzania		Ministry of Justice and Constitutional Affairs	Minister of Justice and Constitutional Affairs	list
Thailand		Ministry of Justice	Minister of Justice	list
Timor-Leste		Ministry of Justice	Minister of Justice	list
Togo		Ministry of Justice and Human Rights	Minister of Justice and Human Rights	list
Tonga		Ministry of Justice	Minister of Justice	list
Trinidad and Tobago		Office of the Attorney General	Attorney General and Minister of Legal Affairs	list
Tunisia		Ministry of Justice	Minister of Justice	list
Turkey		Ministry of Justice	Minister of Justice	list
Turkmenistan		Ministry of Justice	Minister of Justice	list
Turks and Caicos Islands		Office of the Attorney General	Attorney General	list
Tuvalu		Office of the Attorney General	Attorney General	list
Uganda		Ministry of Justice and Constitutional Affairs	Minister of Justice	list
Ukraine		Ministry of Justice	Minister of Justice	list
United Arab Emirates		Ministry of Justice	Minister of Justice	list
United Kingdom		Ministry of Justice	Lord Chancellor; Secretary of State for Justice	list list
	Northern Ireland	Department of Justice	Minister of Justice	list
	Northern Ireland	Office of the Attorney General for Northern Ireland	Attorney General for Northern Ireland	list
	Scotland	Learning and Justice Directorates	Cabinet Secretary for Justice	list
	Wales		Counsel General	list
United States		United States Department of Justice	Attorney General	list
	American Samoa	Department of Legal Affairs	Attorney General	list
	Northern Mariana Islands	Office of the Attorney General	Attorney General	list
	Puerto Rico	Department of Justice	Attorney General and Secretary of Justice	list
	United States Virgin Islands	Department of Justice	Attorney General	list
Uzbekistan		Ministry of Justice	Minister of Justice	list
Vanuatu		Ministry of Justice	Minister of Justice	list
Venezuela		Ministry of Popular Power for Interior Relations, Justice and Peace	Minister of Popular Power for Interior Relations, Justice and Peace	list
Vietnam		Ministry of Justice	Minister of Justice	list
Yemen		Ministry of Justice	Minister of Justice	list
Zambia		Ministry of Justice	Minister of Justice	list
Zimbabwe		Ministry of Justice and Legal Affairs	Minister of Justice	list

== Historical ==
- Ministry of Justice (imperial China): A Chinese government ministry between the Sui and Qing dynasties
- Ministry of Justice (pre-modern Japan): A Japanese government ministry between the Asuka and Meiji periods
- Ministry of Justice (Soviet Union): A government ministry of the USSR that existed from 1923 to 1991
- Ministry of Justice (Yugoslavia): The justice ministry that was responsible for the judicial system of the following: Kingdom of Yugoslavia (1918-1945), SFR Yugoslavia (1945-1992), and FR Yugoslavia period (1992–2003)

== See also ==
- Attorney general
- Interior minister
- List of female justice ministers
- List of first women lawyers and judges by nationality
