= Ministry of Justice and Religious Affairs (Sahrawi Arab Democratic Republic) =

According to the Constitution of the Sahrawi Arab Democratic Republic (1995 amendment), the Ministry of Justice and Religious Affairs holds certain responsibilities. These include being involved in the appointment of the President of the Supreme Court of the Sahrawi Arab Democratic Republic, and having the authority to waive the immunity of National Assembly members that have been charged with a felony or indecency.

== List of ministers ==
- Hamada Salma (2007–2011)
- Abah Al-Deeh Sheikh Mohammed (2012–2013)
- Hafez al-Akhtam (2013–2014)
- Hamada Salma (2014–2016)
- Amrebia Al-Mami Al-Daimi (2016–present)

== See also ==
- Justice ministry
- Sahrawi Arab Democratic Republic
