= Ana Julia Guido =

Nicaraguan jurist

Attorney General of Nicaragua
- Incumbent
- Assumed office 10 April 2014
- President: Daniel Ortega
- Preceded by: Julio César Centeno

Personal details
- Born: Ana Julia Guido Ochoa; 16 February 1959 (age 66); Matagalpa, Nicaragua

Ana Julia Guido Ochoa (born 16 February 1959) is a Nicaraguan jurist who is the attorney general of Nicaragua. She is the first woman to be appointed to the post.

== Personal Sanctions ==
In August 2021, she was made subject to personal sanctions by the European Union over her role as the Attorney General of Nicaragua in oversight and commission of alleged human rights violations and orchestrating a crackdown campaign on political opposition and civil society through politically motivated and bogus charges against demonstrators, activists, and dissidents. This means any of her assets found in the EU jurisdictions should be frozen, and European companies are forbidden to do business with her; she is also barred from traveling to the EU.
