= Deputy Prime Minister of Bahrain =

Political position in the Cabinet of Bahrain

The deputy prime minister of Bahrain is a political position in the Cabinet of Bahrain. Historically, several deputy prime ministers have served concurrently. The first time when deputy prime ministers were appointed took place in November 2002.

== Deputy Prime Ministers ==
- Mohammed bin Mubarak Al Khalifa, November 2002 - June 2022
- Abdullah bin Khalid Al Khalifa, November 2002 - 2005
- Ali bin Khalifa Al Khalifa, 26 September 2005 - June 2022
- Jawad Al Arrayed, 11 December 2006 – June 2022
- Khalid bin Abdullah Al Khalifa, 2 November 2010 - Incumbent
- Salman bin Hamad Al Khalifa, March 2013 - November 2020

== See also ==
- Prime Minister of Bahrain
- Cabinet of Bahrain
