= Bahrain Football Association =

Governing body of association football in Bahrain anjing

AFC
- Short name: BFA
- Founded: 1957; 69 years ago
- Headquarters: Manama, Bahrain
- FIFA affiliation: 1968
- AFC affiliation: 1970
- WAFF affiliation: 2010
- President: Ali bin Khalifa Al Khalifa
- Vice-President: Shaikh Khaled Al Khalifa
- General Secretary: Rashed Al Zaabi
- Website: bfa.bh

The Bahrain Football Association (Arabic: الاتحاد البحريني لكرة القدم) is the governing body of football in Bahrain, and controls the Bahrain national football team, the women's and under-17, under-20 and under-23 national teams and domestic football competitions. It was founded in 1957, and has been a member of FIFA since 1968. It is also a member of the Asian Football Confederation.

== Office-holders and officials ==
Name	Position	Source
(Bahrain) Sheikh Ali Bin Khalifa Al Khalifa	President	
(Bahrain) Shaikh Khaled bin Salman Al Khalifa	Vice President	
(Bahrain) Ali Ahmed Al Bouainain	2nd Vice President	
(Bahrain) H.H. Shaikh Khalifa bin Ali Al Khalifa	3rd Vice President	
(Bahrain) Rashed Al Zaabi	General Secretary	
(Bahrain) Ali Ahmed Al Bouainain	Treasurer	
(Bahrain) Aabed Al Ansari	Technical Director	
(Croatia) Dragan Talajić	Team Coach (Men's)	
(Bahrain) Khalid Al Harban	Team Coach (Women's)	
(Bahrain) Ahmed Mahdi	Media/Communications Manager	
(Bahrain) Alef Al Mannaei	Futsal Coordinator	
(Bahrain) Jasim Karim	Referee Coordinator	

The Association's president is Shaikh Ali bin Khalifa Al Khalifa. The vice-president is Sheikh Ali Bin Khalifa Al-Khalifa.

The General Secretary is Ebrahim Saad Al Buainain.

The National Men's Team Coach is Dragan Talajić (Croatia's ) and the Women's Team Coach is Khaled Al-Harban.

== Bahraini Premier League ==
The Bahraini Premier League, established in 1957, is the top professional football league in Bahrain. Featuring ten teams, the league operates on a system of promotion and relegation with the Bahraini Second Division. Matches are played from October to April, with clubs vying for the championship and qualification to the AFC competitions. Al-Muharraq SC is the most successful club in the league’s history. The league is governed by the Bahrain Football Association and has grown significantly, contributing to the development of football in Bahrain.

== Controversies ==
In November 2017, Saudi Arabia, United Arab Emirates, and Bahrain pulled out of the 23rd Arabian Gulf Cup due to the 2017 Qatar diplomatic crisis.
