= Adis King =

Dominican politician

Minister of Youth Development and Empowerment, Youth at Risk, Gender Affairs, Seniors' Security and Dominicans With Disabilities
- In office 17 December 2019 – 13 December 2022
- Prime Minister: Roosevelt Skerrit
- Preceded by: Catherine Lady Daniel (Gender Affairs); Justina Charles (Youth)
- Succeeded by: Cassandra Williams (Senior's Security and Gender Affairs); Oscar George (Youth)

Personal details
- Born: Saint Joseph, Dominica
- Party: Dominica Labour Party
- Education: University of Havana

Adis King is a Dominican doctor and politician. She served as Minister of Youth Development and Empowerment, Youth at Risk, Gender Affairs, Seniors' Security and Dominicans With Disabilities of Dominica between 2019 and 2022.

== Early life and education ==
King was born in Saint Joseph, Dominica, the fourth of four children, where she grew up and went to school. King worked temporarily on a local banana farm. In 1991, she began teaching at St Joseph's Primary School, a post she held until 1994.

She subsequently began working as a laboratory technician at Princess Margaret Hospital in Roseau until, in 2000, she got a scholarship to study medicine in Cuba, graduating from the University of Havana in 2007 and completing there a postgraduate degree in internal medicine in 2015.

== Career ==
King worked as an internal doctor at Princess Margaret Hospital for several years. She also worked with youth and community organisations supporting rural women and children in need.

On 17 February 2019 Prime Minister Roosevelt Skerrit announced King as the Dominica Labour Party's candidate for Saint Joseph in the 2019 elections. She got elected after defeating Monell Williams of the UWP and received 60.15% of the vote. During the campaign, King promised to transform Saint Joseph into a commercial hub, road repairs, modernise housing, initiatives to promote the local cadence-lypso band Gramacks and its lead singer, as well as educational initiatives, the modernisation of Saint Joseph health centre, and measures to support sustainable agriculture.

Prime Minister Roosevelt Skerrit named her Minister of Youth Development and Empowerment, Youth at Risk, Gender Affairs, Seniors' Security and Dominicans With Disabilities and she was sworn in on 17 December 2019.

During her term in office, she championed the enactment of the Child Protection Bill and the Domestic Violence Bill, as well as tackling violence against older people, regulating care homes, and launching training programmes for marginalised young people in the construction and textile industries. In November 2020 she announced the government's intention to pass the Family Model Bills.

King did not stand for re-election in the 2022 elections and was succeeded as minister on 13 December 2022. Following her political career, she became the coordinator of United Nations agencies in Dominica and worked for the UN Multi-Country Sustainable Development Cooperation Framework (MSDCF) Focal Point.
