= Director of Public Prosecutions (Cayman Islands) =

According to the Constitution of the Cayman Islands, the Office of Director of Public Prosecutions is responsible for the following:

1. To institute and undertake criminal proceedings against any person by any court in respect of any offence against any Law in force in the Cayman Islands.
2. To take over and continue any criminal proceedings that have been instituted or undertaken by himself of herself or any other person or authority.
3. To discontinue at any stage before judgment is delivered any such criminal proceedings instituted or undertaken by himself of herself or any other person or authority.

The Office of Director of Public Prosecutions is considered the Ministers of Justice for the Cayman Islands. Although the office was created in 2009, the first Director of Public Prosecutions Cheryl Richards was not appointed until 2011.

== List of directors ==
- Cheryl Richards (2011–November 2018)
- Patrick Moran (Resigned)

== See also ==
- Justice ministry
- Politics of Cayman Islands
