= Mohammed bin Mubarak Al Khalifa =

Bahraini politician

Mohammad bin Mubarak Al Khalifa
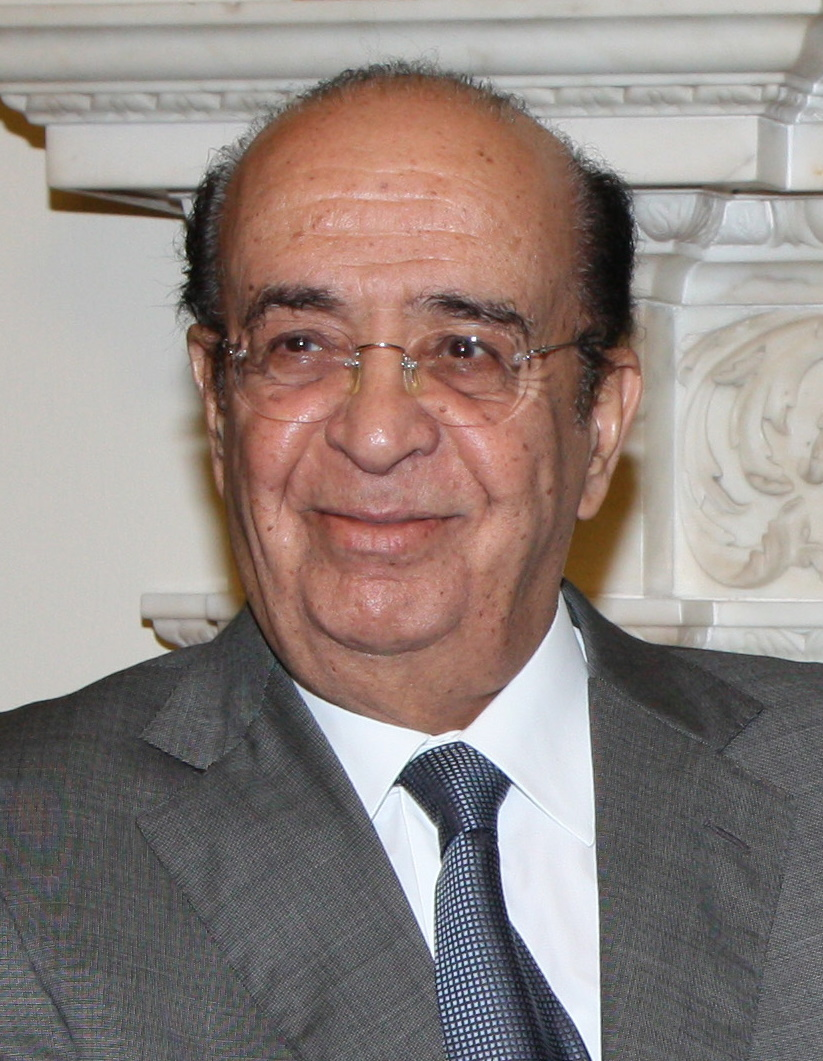

Deputy Prime Minister of Bahrain
- In office: November 2002 – June 2022
- Monarch: King Hamad

Minister of Foreign Affairs
- In office: 12 January 1969 – 29 September 2005
- Predecessor: Office established
- Successor: Khalid bin Ahmed Al Khalifa
- Monarch: King Isa; King Hamad
- Born: 1935 (age 90–91)
- Spouse: Shaikha Moza bint Khalifa bin Hamad Al Khalifa
- House: Al Khalifa
- Father: Sheikh Mubarak bin Hamad Al Khalifa (died 1977)
- Mother: Sheikh Noura bint Abdullah bin Jabr al-Dosari (died 2016)
- Religion: Islam

Styles of Sheikh Muhammad
- Reference style: His Highness
- Spoken style: Your Highness
- Alternative style: Sheikh

Mohammad bin Mubarak Al Khalifa (Arabic: محمد بن مبارك بن حمد آل خليفة; born 1935) is a Bahraini politician and a member of the Bahrain's royal family. He served as Bahrain's Minister of Foreign Affairs from 1969 to 2005, and then as one of the Deputy Prime Ministers from November 2002 until 21 November 2022.

King Hamad appointed Mohammed bin Mubarak as a Special Representative on 16 June 2022.

== Education ==
Khalifa received his secondary education at the International School of the American University in Beirut. He holds a bachelor's degree in international relations and law, which he obtained from the University of London.

== Career ==
He started his career as a judge and then became the director of public relations, director of media and head of foreign affairs during Bahrain's establishment in 1969. He was Minister of Foreign Affairs for nearly 35 years, from before Bahrain's independence in 1971 until a cabinet reshuffle on 29 September 2005, when he was replaced by Khalid ibn Ahmad Al Khalifah. Mohammad was instead appointed as one of three deputy prime ministers in the September 2005 reshuffle. During that time he was also Minister of Information. His official title is Deputy Prime Minister for Ministerial Committees.
