= Al-Qudaibiya Palace =

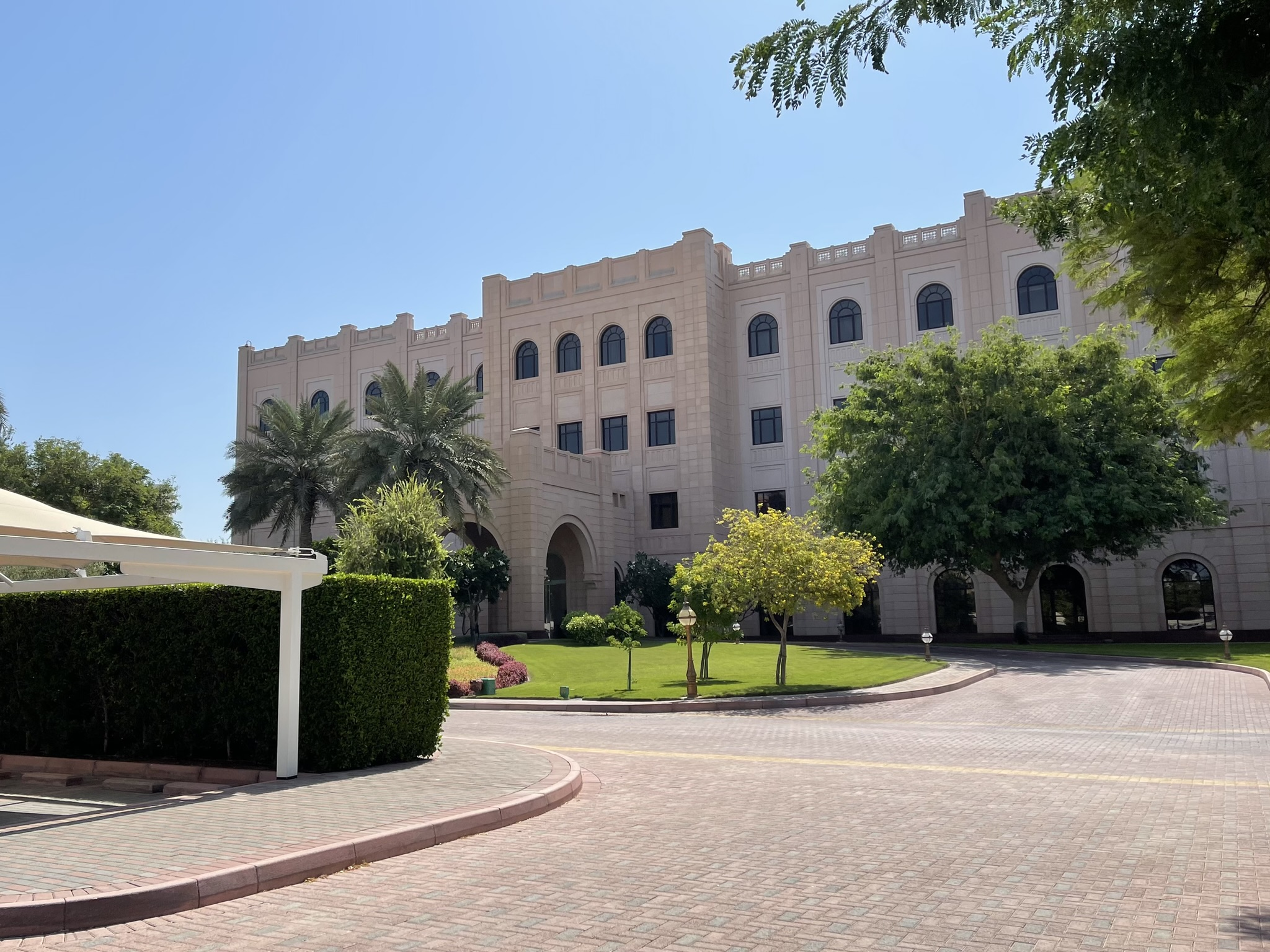
- Al-Qudaibiya Palace's northern façade

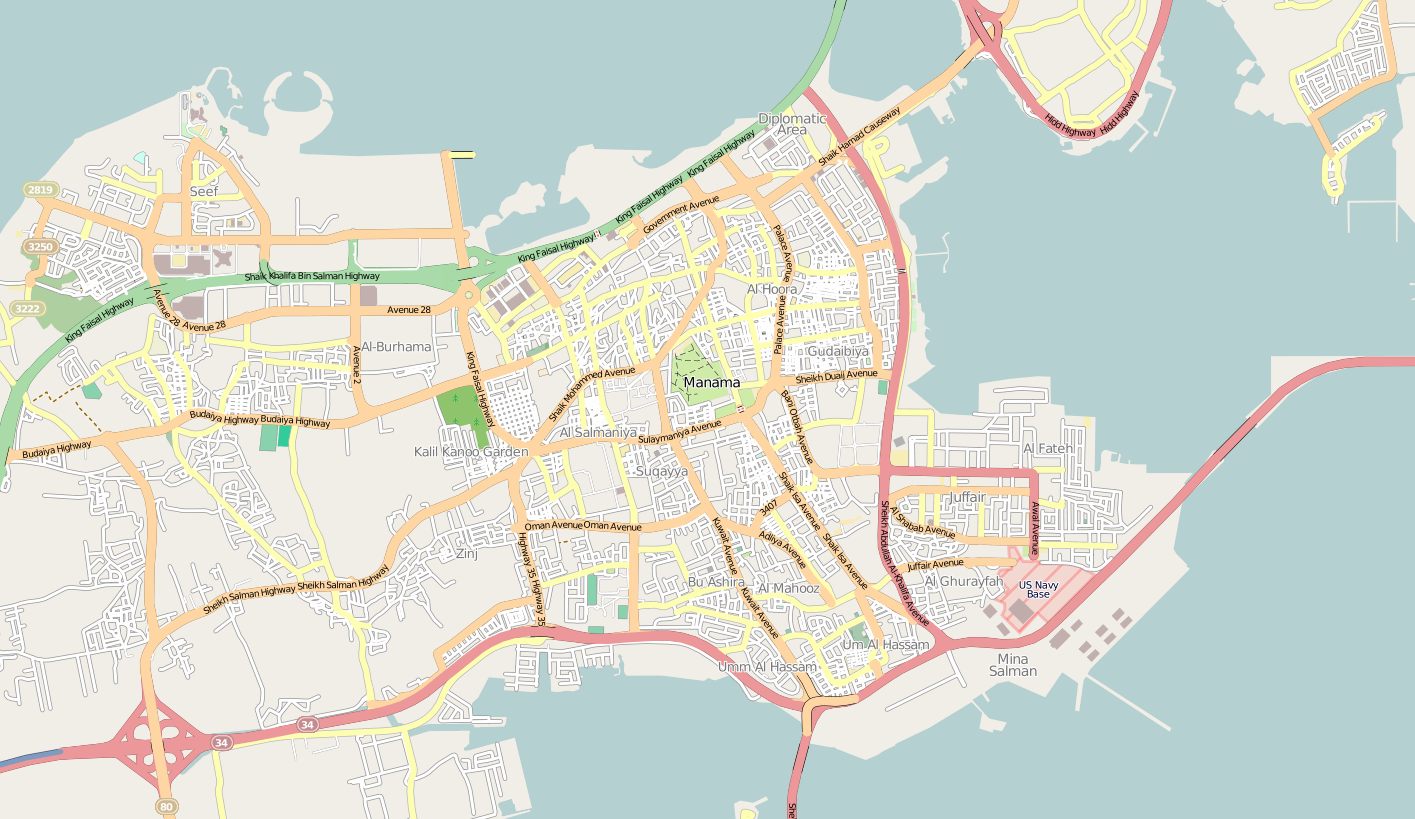
- Location within Manama Location within Bahrain

General information
- Type: Palace
- Architectural style: Modern Arabic
- Location: Manama, Bahrain
- Coordinates: 26°13′07″N 50°35′34″E

Al-Qudaibiya Palace or Gudaibiya Palace (Arabic: قصر القضيبية) is a palace in Gudaibiya, Manama, Bahrain. Located off Bani Otbah Avenue and Al Fatih Highway, it lies west of the Al Fateh Grand Mosque and southeast of the Old Palace of Manama and the Andalus Garden and Manama Cemetery. It is a light pink palace with a pearl-coloured, onion-shaped dome.

== History ==
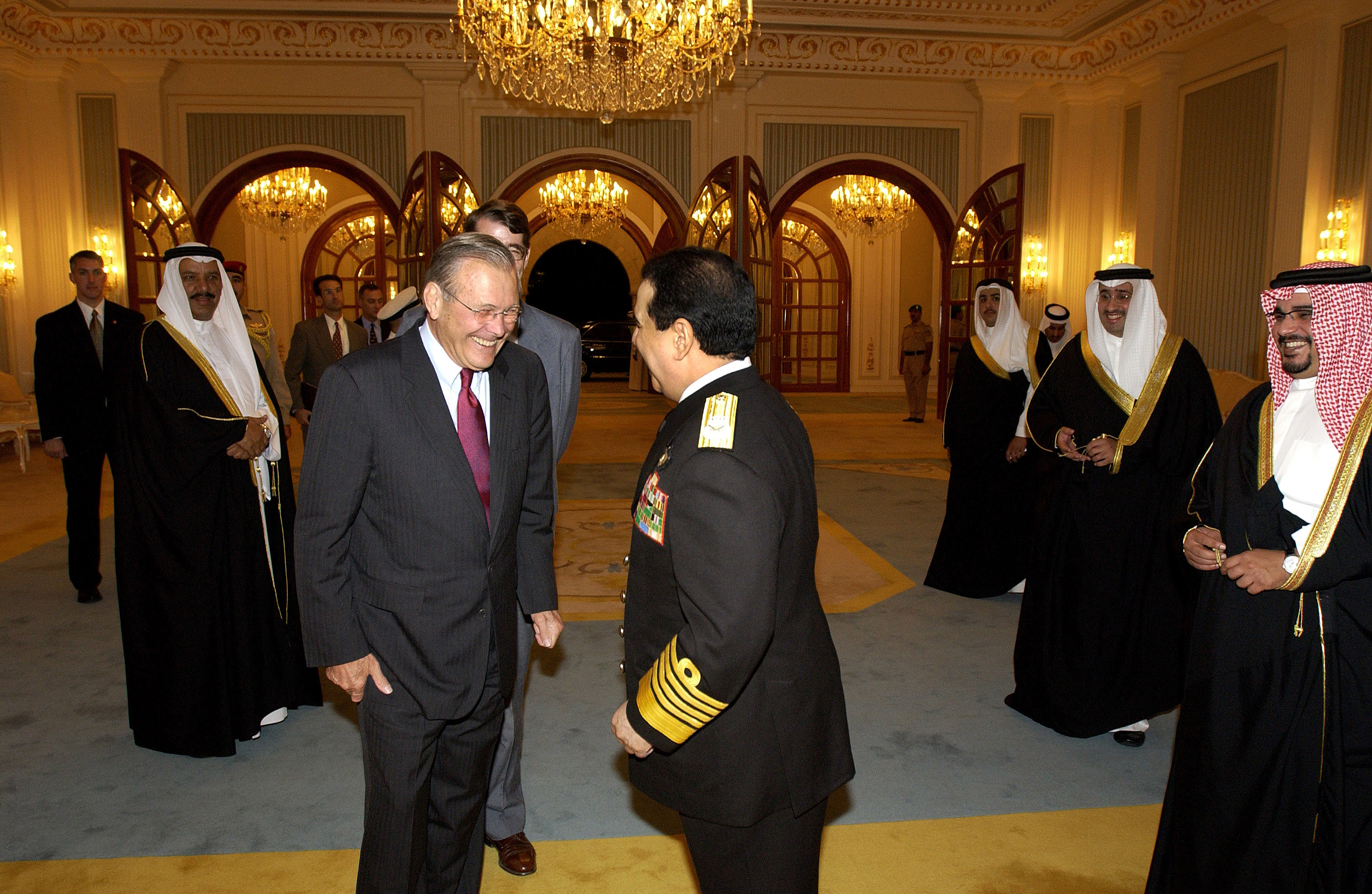
Secretary of Defense Donald Rumsfeld (left) being greeted by Crown Prince Salman bin Hamad Al Khalifa in the Gudaibiya Palace on 9 October 2004

For decades the palace has hosted some of the most important political and economy-related conferences in the country, having a prominent role in the foreign affairs of the country. The proclamation of the accession of Salman Al Khalifa, after his father's death in February 1942 was made from the steps of the Gudaibiya Palace, read by the ruler's uncle, Shaikh Mohammad bin Isa. It has a major political function; the King's cabinet usually meets every Sunday at the palace and the Prime Minister has an office at the palace. The landscaping of the Gudaibiya Palace grounds was carried out, between September 2007 and September 2008, by the Ministry of Works.

The palace is a main venue for Bahrain's official welcome ceremonies, where visiting leaders are greeted with a guard of honour and national anthems. Guests have included Abu Dhabi's Crown Prince, Sheikh Khaled bin Mohamed, in November 2024, Italian Prime Minister Giorgia Meloni in January 2025, and Cyprus's President Nikos Christodoulides in January 2026. Israeli Prime Minister Naftali Bennett was welcomed there in the first visit to Bahrain by an Israeli head of government, in February 2022. The Crown Prince and Prime Minister also holds meetings with officials at the palace. During the 2011 uprising, thousands of opposition supporters blocked the palace entrance on a Sunday in March but failed to disrupt the cabinet meeting held there.
