= Philippa Mdluli =

Swazi child murderer and cannibal

- Born: 1934 or 1935; Swaziland Protectorate
- Died: 2 July 1983 (aged 48); Mbabane, Swaziland
- Cause of death: Execution by hanging
- Occupation: Entrepreneur
- Status: Executed
- Criminal charges: Child murder
- Penalty: Death (1982)

Details
- Victims: Thuli Mabaso (Note: Sources state the age of the victim as five or two.)

Philippa Mdluli (1934 or 1935 – 2 July 1983) was a Swazi businesswoman, convicted child murderer, and cannibal who became the last person to be executed by Eswatini.

Mdluli was hanged on 2 July 1983 for the ritual murder of one of her employees' daughters three years earlier.

== Life and crime ==
Mdluli, a native Swazi woman, had become a successful restaurant owner in Mbabane, the country's capital. By the late 1970s, she was operating the Lifa Restaurant and had become obsessed with rituals (muti), which, in her view, involved a human sacrifice to make her wish come true. In March 1980, driven by her desire to earn more money, she manipulated a young male employee of her restaurant into giving up his young daughter to her in order to perform a form of muti ritual to broaden her business career. The victim was 5-year-old Thuli Mabaso, the daughter of an employee at Lifa.

One day in March 1980, Mdluli took Thuli with the complicity of the child's father, murdering the girl by suffocation. She subsequently mutilated the body and removed several of the child's organs to make potions that she later served to the restaurant's customers. While not suffering from any known mental illness, Mdluli believed in the muti belief that young children's innocence made the potions more efficient to attract wealth. Following the girl's disappearance, the Royal Swaziland Police began an investigation that rapidly linked Thuli's father's employment at Lifa Restaurant to Mdluli.

Mdluli was arrested shortly after the crime and was held pending investigations and the collection of medical evidence as well as the testimony of Thuli's father, who confessed to having been coerced by Mdluli. Her trial began before the High Court in early 1982, where she was found guilty of the charges and sentenced to death shortly afterward. Mdluli appealed her sentence, which three High Court judges rejected on 12 April 1982, upholding her sentence of death. She asked King Sobhuza II to grant her a pardon or commute her sentence; however, the king died in August 1982, and the acting regency that succeeded him denied clemency to Mdluli towards the end of 1982.

== Execution and aftermath ==
After losing her appeals and being denied clemency by the royal regency, Mdluli's path to execution was paved. Sometime in early to mid-1983, the acting royal regency signed Mdluli's execution warrant, and her hanging was scheduled for the early hours of Saturday, 2 July 1983. Mdluli was hanged at the Sidwashini Prison outside of Mbabane. After her execution, the hangman was never seen again, with some people in Eswatini arguing that he moved back to South Africa, where the African National Congress banned him from taking part in executions after abolishing the death penalty in the country. Earlier the same day of Mdluli's execution, seven men were hanged for other murders.

Following Mdluli's execution, no more death sentences have been carried out in Eswatini. Since then, the country has become a de facto abolitionist nation, imposing few death sentences in extreme cases to satisfy statutory punishments. In March 1998, the government attempted to reactivate executions by ordering the hanging of Daniel Mbhundlana Dlamini, a cattle farmer convicted of the ritual slaying of a 9-year-old boy. The then-minister of justice Paul Kumalo told media that the government was seeking to hire an executioner and that women were "welcome" to take the position, adding that they had received offers from countries as far from Eswatini as Japan, Canada, and the United Kingdom. Maweni Simelane, another minister inside the justice cabinet, stated that an executioner was needed to "clear" death row at Matsapha Central Prison. The chief prosecutor, Jabulani Maseko, further stated that most of the cases on death row were cases of murder that had been handed a sentence of death many years before. The successor of King Sobhuza II, King Mswati III, centralized power around him after taking office, showing a much closer stance to clemency in cases of capital punishment. As a result, the moratorium on executions in Eswatini continues to be in place as of 2026.

== See also ==
- List of most recent executions by jurisdiction
