= Prime Minister of Bahrain =

Head of government

- رئيس وزراء البحرين; Raʼīs Wuzarāʼ al-Baḥrayn
- Coat of arms of the Kingdom of Bahrain

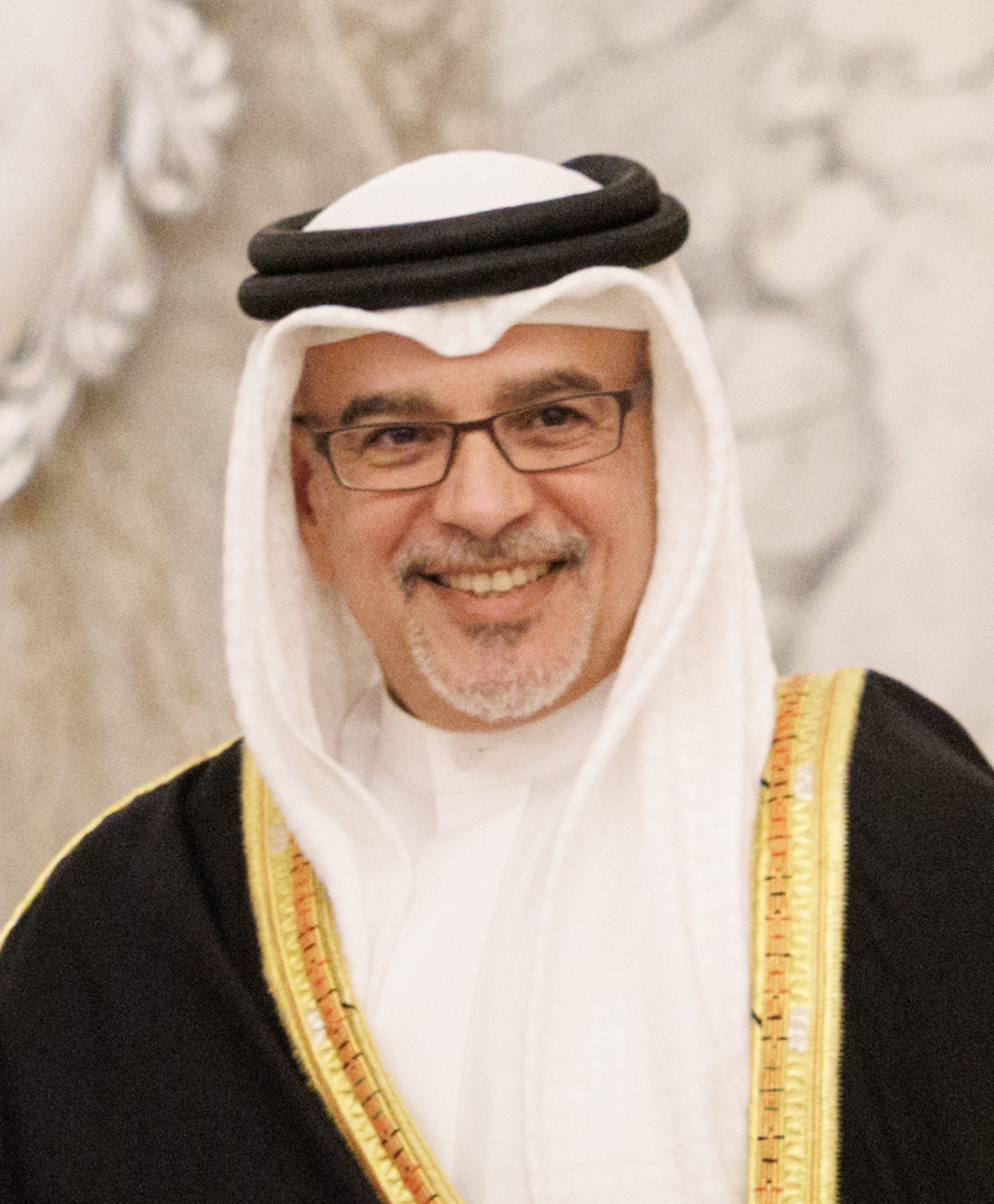
- Incumbent; Salman bin Hamad Al Khalifa since 11 November 2020
- Type: Head of government
- Residence: Al-Qudaibiya Palace (Head office)
- Appointer: King of Bahrain
- Formation: 19 January 1970
- First holder: Khalifa bin Salman Al Khalifa
- Deputy: Deputy Prime Minister of Bahrain
- Salary: .د.ب 7,500 monthly

The prime minister of the Kingdom of Bahrain (Arabic: رئيس مجلس الوزراء في مملكة البحرين, romanized: Raʼīs Majlis al-Wuzarāʼ fī Mamlakat al-Baḥrayn) is the head of government of the Kingdom of Bahrain. The prime minister is directly appointed by the king. The constitution does not require the prime minister to be an elected member of the Council of Representatives.

Since becoming independent, Bahrain has only had two prime ministers: Khalifa bin Salman Al Khalifa, the king's paternal uncle, and Salman bin Hamad Al Khalifa, the crown prince. Khalifa bin Salman Al Khalifa died on 11 November 2020.

Before becoming prime minister, Prince Salman bin Hamad Al Khalifa held the positions of deputy king, crown prince, and heir apparent. He served as the First Deputy Prime Minister from March 2013 until November 2020.

The current deputy prime minister is Shaikh Khalid bin Abdullah Al Khalifa.

== List of officeholders (1970–present) ==
No.	Portrait	Name (Birth–Death)	Term of office		
No.	Portrait	Name (Birth–Death)	Took office	Left office	Time in office
1		Sheikh; Khalifa bin Salman Al Khalifa خليفة بن سلمان آل خليفة (1935–2020)	10 January 1970	11 November 2020 (Died in office)	50 years, 306 days
2		Sheikh; Salman bin Hamad Al Khalifa سلمان بن حمد آل خليفة (born 1969)	11 November 2020	Incumbent	5 years, 300 days

== See also ==
- Politics of Bahrain
- Deputy Prime Minister of Bahrain
