= Dutch Caribbean Police Force =

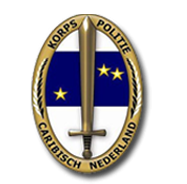

Agency overview
- Formed: 10 October 2010
- Employees: 5,000
- Annual budget: €17.6 million (2016)

Jurisdictional structure
- Map of Dutch Caribbean Police Force's jurisdiction
- Area: 328 km2 (127 sq mi)
- General nature: Civilian police

Operational structure
- Headquarters: Kaya Libertador Simon Bolivar #4; Kralendijk, Bonaire
- Agency executive: Alwijn Braaf, (Korpschef)
- Departments: 5: Basic Police Care; Investigation; Intake, Information and Operational Support; Operations; Staff

Facilities
- Stations: 6: District 1: Kralendijk; District 2: Rincon; District 3: Amboina; District 4: Oranjestad; District 5: The Bottom

Website
- politiecn.com

The Dutch Caribbean Police Force (Dutch: Korps Politie Caribisch Nederland or KPCN) is the law enforcement agency of the Caribbean Netherlands.

== Authority ==
The force operates under the authority of the Ministry of Security and Justice. While maintaining public order and carrying out relief work, under the authority of the Island Governor of the relevant public body. During the investigation of criminal offenses, the police force operates under the authority of the joint Attorney General of Curaçao, Sint Maarten and the Caribbean Netherlands.

== Management ==
- Commissioner: Alwyn Braaf
- Director General of Police and Safety Regions at the Ministry of Justice and Security: Monique Vogelzang
- Force manager: David van Weel, Minister of Justice and Security.
- Chief Prosecutor: Guillano Schoop

The Director General of Police at the Ministry of Justice and Security has a mandate to fulfill certain administrative tasks such as appointment, promotion, suspension, and dismissal of police officers.

== Organization ==
Most of the employees work on Bonaire. These are distributed between headquarters in Kralendijk and the stations in Ambonia and in Rincon. On St. Eustatius there is one police station in Oranjestad and on Saba there is one police station in The Bottom and one in Windwardside. The force is organized into four divisions:

- Basic Police Care
- Investigation
- Intake, Information and Operational Support
- Operations and Staff, headed by the office of the Commissioner (Dutch: Korpschef).
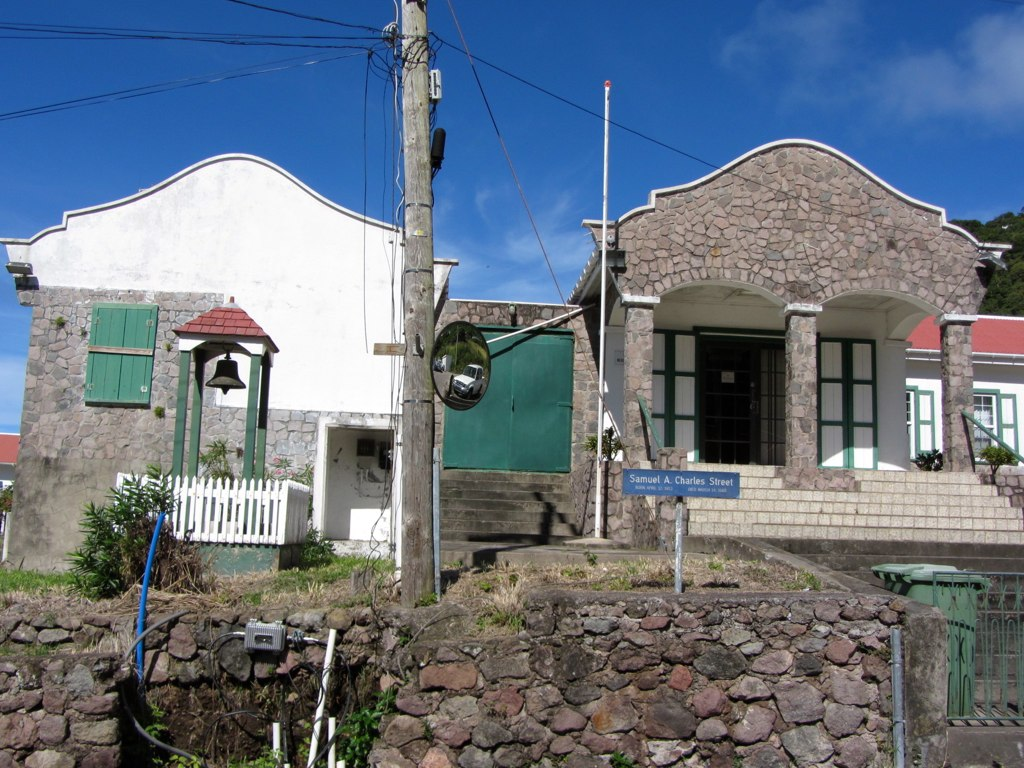
The police station in The Bottom (Saba)

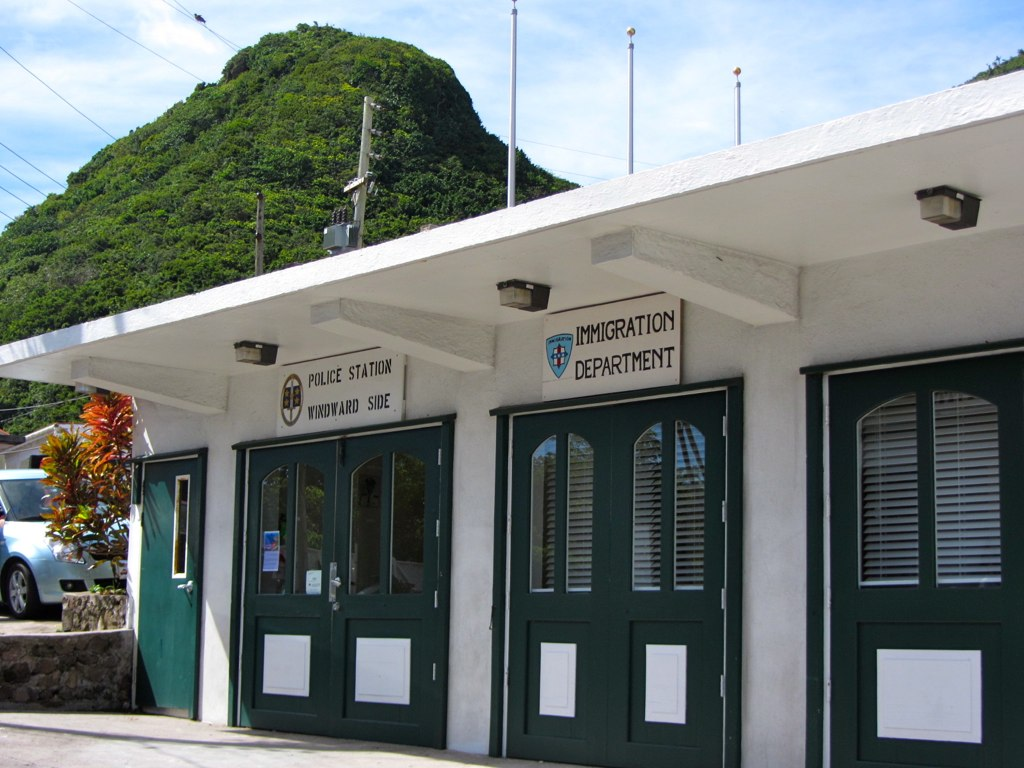
The police station in Windwardside (Saba)

=== Ranks ===
Police ranks of the Dutch Caribbean Police Force
Rank	Chief Commissioner (Hoofdcommissaris)	Commissioner (Commissaris)	Chief Inspector (Hoofdinspecteur)	Inspector (Inspecteur)
Insignia				
Rank	Chief Constable (Hoofdagent)	Sergeant (Brigadier)	Constable (Agent)	Police Trainee (Aspirant)
Insignia				

== List of commissioners ==
Portrait	Name	Took office	Left office
	Jan Rooijakker	2010	2013
	Hildegard Buitink	2013	2016
	Jose Rosales	2017	2023
	Alwyn Braaf	2023	Incumbent

== See also ==
- Europol
- Law enforcement in the Netherlands
