= Ministry of Justice (Bahrain) =

Government ministry of Bahrain

Ministry of Justice, Islamic Affairs and Waqf
- وزارة العدل والشؤون الإسلامية والأوقاف; Wizārat al-‘Adl wa-al-Shu’ūn al-Islāmīyah wa-al-Awqāf

Ministry overview
- Type: Government Ministry
- Jurisdiction: Cabinet of Bahrain
- Headquarters: Government Road, Manama; 26°14′15.96″N 50°34′42.14″E
- Minister responsible: Nawaf bin Mohammed Al-Mawadah, Minister of Justice
- Website: moj.gov.bh

The Ministry of Justice, Islamic Affairs and Waqf (Arabic: وزارة العدل والشؤون الإسلامية والأوقاف, romanized: Wizārat al-‘Adl wa-al-Shu’ūn al-Islāmīyah wa-al-Awqāf) was established shortly after Bahrain achieved independence in 1971, to replace the Department of Justice. The Ministry oversees all administrative aspects related to the court system in the country while keeping contact with the Supreme Council of the Judiciary and all relevant bodies in the justice system and law enforcement.

In 2005, the name of the Ministry was changed to Ministry of Justice, Islamic Affairs and Endowments due to the added task of regulating and supervising political affiliations.

All members of the Al Khalifa royal family are members of the civil judiciary.

== List of ministers ==
Name	Start	End
Sheikh Daij bin Hamad Al Khalifa	1956	1969
Sheikh Khalid bin Mohammed bin Abdullah Al Khalifa	1971	1974
Sheikh Isa bin Mohammed Al Khalifa	1974	1975
Sheikh Abdullah bin Khalid bin Ali Al Khalifa	August 1975	November 2002
Jawad Al Arrayed	November 2002	January 2005
Mohammed Ali Al-Sitri	January 2005	December 2006
Sheikh Khalid bin Ali bin Abdullah Al Khalifa	December 2007	June 2022
Nawaf bin Mohammed Al-Mawadah	June 2022	present

== See also ==
- Justice ministry
- Politics of Bahrain
