= Ian Douglas (politician) =

Dominican attorney and politician

- Born: Dominica
- Occupation: Politician
- Political party: Dominica Labour Party

Ian Douglas is an attorney and politician from Dominica. He is the Member of Parliament for the Portsmouth Constituency. Since May 2005, he has been a member of the Cabinet of Dominica, currently serving as Minister of Tourism, Legal Affairs and Civil Aviation. Douglas entered Parliament in the by-election following the death of his uncle former Prime Minister and Portsmouth MP Roosevelt Douglas. Douglas is also the son of former Leader of the Opposition and Portsmouth MP Michael Douglas. Before a Cabinet reshuffle in October 2007, Douglas served as Attorney General and Minister of Legal Affairs, Labor and Immigration. He is a member of the Dominica Labour Party.
