= Ministry of Justice (Eswatini) =

Government ministry of Eswatini

The Ministry of Justice and Constitutional Affairs of Eswatini oversees the administration of justice through the various courts. The ministry has responsibilities such as the following:

- Coordinating, advising on, providing support, and implementing policies that will support the administration of law and justice as well as constitutional governance.
- Aiding in the development and enactment of appropriate legislation.
- Drafting, revising, and reforming the laws of Swaziland and any related legal documents.
- Advising the federal government and its allies on legal matters.
- Overseeing the training of lawyers.
- Promoting and protecting human rights, as well as preventing societal corruption.
- Providing safe custody of inmates and offering rehabilitation services.

== List of ministers (Post-1968 upon achieving independence) ==
- Polycarp Dlamini (1972-1983)
- David Matse (1984-1987)
- Reginald Dhladhla (1988-1990)
- Amos Zonke Khumalo (1991-1993)
- Maweni Simelane (1994-2003)
- Magwagwa Mduli (2003)
- David Dlamini (2004-2009)
- Ndumiso Mamba (2009-2011)
- Mgwagwa Gamedze (2011-2013)
- Sibusiso Shongwe (2013-2015)
- Edgar Hillary (2015–2018)
- Pholile Dlamini-Shakantu (2018-present)

== See also ==
- Justice ministry
- Politics of Eswatini
