= Ali bin Khalifa Al Khalifa =

Bahraini politician

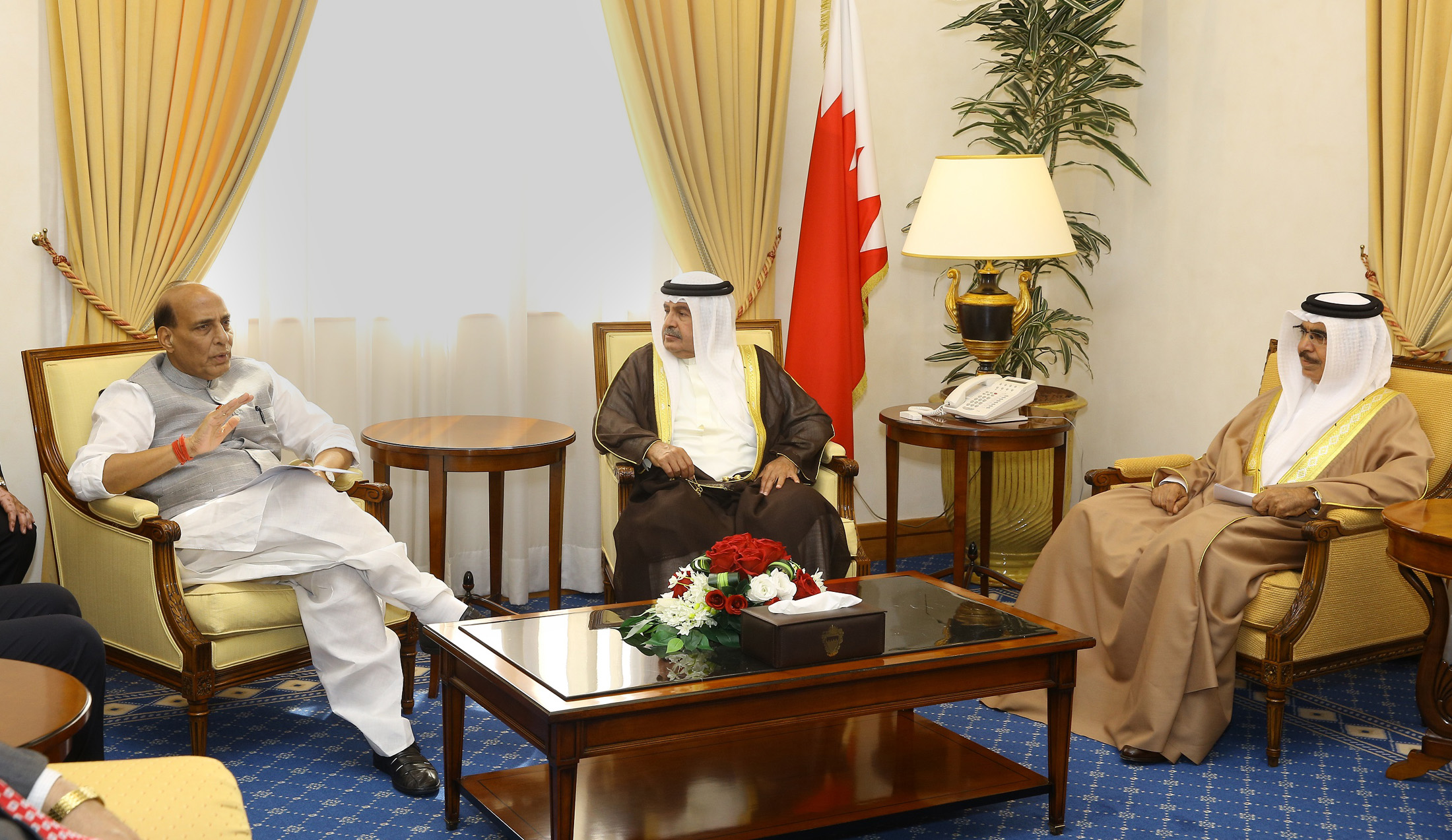
- Ali in center

Deputy Prime Minister of Bahrain
- In office September 2005 – June 2022
- Monarch: Hamad bin Isa Al Khalifa

Personal details
- Born: 1957 (age 68–69) Bahrain
- Parent: Khalifa bin Salman Al Khalifa

H.E. Sheikh Ali bin Khalifa Al Khalifa is a member of the Bahraini ruling family.

Ali was born in 1957.

In 1993 he was appointed as Minister of Transportation. Ali was appointed as Deputy Prime Minister and Minister of Transportation in September 2005. He held the post of deputy Prime Minister until a cabinet reshuffle in June 2022. He was then appointed as advisor for the King and the Prime Minister.

Ha has been the chairman of the board of Gulf Air since 1994.

He is a son of Khalifa bin Salman Al Khalifa.
