= Abdullah bin Khalid bin Ali Al Khalifa =

Bahraini writer, historian, poet, and politician (1922–2018)

- عبد الله بن خالد بن علي آل خليفة

Deputy Prime Minister of Bahrain
- In office November 2002 – 2005

Personal details
- Born: 1922 Muharraq, Bahrain
- Died: June 5, 2018 (aged 95–96) Manama, Bahrain
- Education: Al-Hidaya Al-Khalifia Boys School
- Occupation: judge, politician, writer, poet

Abdullah bin Khalid bin Ali Al Khalifa (Arabic: عبد الله بن خالد بن علي آل خليفة, born 1922 in Muharraq, died June 5, 2018) was a Bahraini writer, historian, poet, and politician, best-known for heading the country’s Supreme Council for Islamic Affairs.

In 1954 he established the first public library in Bahrain. He served in the Cabinet of Bahrain on several positions since 1971. He served as Minister of Agriculture and Municipalities until 1975, and then as Minister of Justice and Islamic Affairs. He was also one of the Deputy Prime Ministers from November 2002 to 2005.
