= Faisal =

- Pronunciation: Arabic: [ˈfæjsˤɑl, ˈfeːsˤɑl]
- Gender: Male

Origin
- Origin: Arabic
- Meaning: the arbitrator or separator between good and evil, the honoured one [actions of people in the religious context]
- Region of origin: Arabian Peninsula

Other names
- Alternative spelling: Faisel , Faysal, Fayçal, Foysal

Faisal, Faisel, Faycal, Fayçal, Faysal, Faissal, Foysal, Fayssal, or Feisal (Arabic: فيصل) is a masculine given name of Arabic origin. Notable people with the name include:

== Given name ==
=== Faisal ===
- Faisal of Saudi Arabia (1906–1975), Saudi king
- Faisal I (1885–1933), Iraqi king
- Faisal II (1935–1958), Iraqi king
- Faisal Abbasi, Pakistani Navy officer
- Faisal Abdu'Allah (born 1969), British artist and barber
- Faisal Abdulaziz (1968–2021), Bahraini footballer
- Faisal Raza Abidi, Pakistani politician
- Faisal Julius Achmad (born 1981), Indonesian basketball player
- Faisal Aden (born 1989), Somali basketball player
- Faisal Afridi (born 1977), Pakistani cricket player and umpire
- Faisal Agab (born 1978), Sudanese footballer
- Faisal Akram (born 2003), Pakistani cricketer
- Faisal Alam (born 1977), Pakistani activist
- Faisal Kamal Alam (born 1969), Pakistani jurist
- Faisal Alawi (1949–2010), Yemeni singer and oudist
- Faisal Abdulrahman Abdullah Aldakheel (died 2004), Saudi suspected terrorist
- Faisal Ali (footballer) (born 1999), Indian footballer
- Faisal F. Alibrahim, Saudi politician
- Faisal Alrajehi (born 1998), Kuwaiti paralympic athlete
- Faisal Amin, Pakistan Navy officer
- Faisal Antar (born 1978), Lebanese footballer
- Faisal Arab (born 1955), Pakistani jurist
- Faisal Athar (born 1975), Pakistani cricketer
- Faisal Jeylani Aweys (born 1987), Somali taekwondo practitioner
- Faisal Ajab Al-Azemi (born 1993), Kuwaiti footballer
- Faisal Aziz (born 1957), Iraqi footballer
- Faisal Al Badri (born 1990), Libyan footballer
- Faisal Bangal (born 1996), Mozambican footballer
- Faisal Al Bannai, Emirati technology executive, entrepreneur, and politician
- Faisal al Basam (born 1965), Saudi archer
- Faisal Basri (1959–2024), Indonesian economist and politician
- Faisal Bezzine (born 1964), Tunisian actor
- Faisal Bodahoom (born 1988), Bahraini footballer
- Faisal Buressli (born 1961), Kuwaiti basketball player and coach
- Faisal Al-Dakhil (born 1957), Kuwaiti footballer
- Faisal Daoud (born 1954), Lebanese politician
- Faisal Ali Dar, Indian martial arts coach
- Faisal Darisi (born 1997), Saudi footballer
- Faisal Darraj (born 1943), Palestinian literary and cultural critic
- Faisal Darwish (born 1991), Saudi footballer
- Faisal Devji (born 1964), Tanzanian historian
- Faisal al-Duwaish (1882–1931), Saudi tribal sheikh
- Faisal Al Enezi (born 1988), Kuwaiti footballer
- Faisal Faisal (born 1980), Iraqi footballer and athlete
- Faisal Mahmud Faizee, Bangladeshi jurist
- Faisal Fanoos (born 1997), Indian cricketer
- Faisal Farooqui, Indian entrepreneur, investor, and activist
- Faisal Al-Fayez (born 1952), Jordanian politician
- Faisal Fulad, Bahraini politician and human rights activist
- Faisal Amin Khan Gandapur (born 1975), Pakistani politician
- Faisal Al-Ghamdi (born 2001), Saudi footballer
- Faisal Gill (born 1972), Pakistani-American lawyer, administrator, and politician
- Faisal Halim (born 1998), Malaysian footballer
- Faisal al-Hamar, Bahraini politician
- Faisal Hashmi (born 1985), Indian film director and screenwriter
- Faisal Hassan, Somali-Canadian politician
- Faisal Ali Hassan (born 1981), Emirati footballer
- Faisal Hawar (born 1963), Somali entrepreneur
- Faisal Hayat (born 2003), Pakistani baseball player
- Faisal Saleh Hayat (born 1952), Pakistani politician and sports administrator
- Faisal al-Hegelan (1929–2019), Saudi diplomat
- Faisal Helwani (1946–2008), Lebanese-Ghanaian record producer and artist manager
- Faisal Hossain (born 1978), Bangladeshi cricketer
- Faisal al-Hourani (1939–2022), Palestinian writer and journalist
- Faisal Husseini (1940–2001), Palestinian politician
- Faisal Ibrahim (born 1976), Jordanian footballer
- Faisal Iqbal (cricketer) (born 1981), Pakistani cricket coach and player
- Faisal Iqbal (footballer) (born 1992), Pakistani footballer
- Faisal Irfan (born 1979), Pakistani cricketer
- Faisal Islam (born 1977), British journalist
- Faisal Hayat Jabboana, Pakistani politician
- Faisal Khan Jamali, Pakistani politician
- Faisal Jamil, Pakistani politician
- Faisal Jassim (born 1991), Iraqi footballer
- Faisal Javed (born 1981), Pakistani politician
- Faisal Javed (cricketer) (born 1975), Pakistani-Qatari footballer
- Faisal Kapadia (born 1971), Pakistani musician
- Faisal Karami (born 1971), Lebanese politician
- Faisal Karim (born 1981), Pakistani boxer
- Faisal Al-Ketbi (born 1987), Emirati wrestler and grappler
- Faisal Khalil (born 1982), Emirati footballer
- Faisal Khan (born 1966), Indian actor
- Faisal Khan (dancer) (born 1999), Indian dancer and actor
- Faisal Raza Khan, Indian actor, director, and photographer
- Faisal Zaman Khan (born 1967), Pakistani jurist
- Faisal Khartash (born 1952), Syrian writer and novelist
- Faisal Ayub Khokhar, Pakistani politician
- Faisal Karim Kundi (born 1975), Pakistani politician
- Faisal Kutty (born 1968), Canadian lawyer, academic, writer, and activist
- Faisal Rasul Lodhi, Pakistani Navy officer
- Faisal Mahmud (born 1983), Bangladeshi football coach and player
- Faisal Malik (born 1980), Indian actor
- Faisal Manap (born 1975), Singaporean politician
- Faisal Mangondato (born 1962), Filipino businessman and politician
- Faisal Maodah (born 1990), Saudi footballer
- Faisal Masud (1954–2019), Pakistani endocrinologist
- Faisal Matloub (born 1948), Iraqi weightlifter
- Faisal Mekdad (born 1954), Syrian diplomat and politician
- Faisal Al-Merqeb (born 1981), Saudi footballer
- Faisal Al-Mousawi (born 1944), Bahraini physician and politician
- Faisal bin Abdulrahman bin Muaammar (born 1959), Saudi politician
- Faisal Mubashir (born 1986), Pakistani cricketer
- Faisal bin Abdulaziz Al Muqrin, Saudi prince and politician
- Faisal Mushtaq (born 1978), Pakistani academic and politician
- Faisal Saeed Al Mutar (born 1991), Iraqi human rights activist
- Faisal Naseem (born 1973), Maldivian politician
- Faisal Naseer, Pakistani Army general and spymaster
- Faisal Naved (born 1980), Pakistani cricketer
- Faisal Al-Muslim Al-Otaibi (born 1962), Kuwaiti politician
- Faisal al-Qassem (born 1961), British-Syrian television personality
- Faisal Qureshi (Pakistani comedian) (born 1973), Pakistani actor and director
- Faisal Rafiq (born 1975), Pakistani politician
- Faisal Rahman, Indian politician
- Faisal Saleem Rahman, Pakistani politician
- Faisal Rajab (born 1954), Yemeni military officer
- Faisal Rashid (born 1972), British politician
- Faisal Amin Abu-Rass (born 1957), Yemeni diplomat and politician
- Faisal Mumtaz Rathore (born 1978), Pakistani politician
- Faisal Rehman (born 1966), Pakistani actor, screenwriter, and director
- Faisal Rosli (born 1991), Malaysian footballer
- Faisal H. M. Al-Sabah (born 1963), Kuwaiti diplomat
- Faisal bin Ali Al Said (1927–2003), Omani royal and politician
- Faisal Saif (1976–2022), Indian film director, film critic, and writer
- Faisal Sakhizada (born 1990), Afghan footballer
- Faisal Saleh, Sudanese journalist and columnist
- Faisal bin Abdullah Al Saud (born 1950) (born 1950), Saudi royal
- Faisal bin Abdullah Al Saud (born 1978) (born 1978), Saudi businessman, royal, and politician
- Faisal bin Abdul Rahman Al Saud, Saudi prince
- Faisal bin Bandar Al Saud (born 1945) (born 1945), Saudi government official
- Faisal bin Bandar bin Sultan Al Saud, Saudi royal and businessman
- Faisal bin Fahd Al Saud (1946–1999) (1946–1999), Saudi prince and politician
- Faisal bin Fahd Al Saud (businessman), Saudi businessman and prince
- Faisal bin Farhan Al Saud (born 1974), Saudi diplomat and politician
- Faisal bin Hamad Al Khalifa (1991–2006), Bahraini royal
- Faisal bin Khalid Al Saud (born 1954) (born 1954), Saudi politician and prince
- Faisal bin Khalid Al Saud (born 1973) (born 1973), Saudi royal and politician
- Faisal bin Mishaal Al Saud (born 1959), Saudi politician and writer
- Faisal bin Musaid Al Saud (1944–1975), Saudi royal
- Faisal bin Salman Al Saud (born 1970), Saudi businessman and prince
- Faisal bin Sattam Al Saud (born 1970), Saudi diplomat
- Faisal bin Sultan Al Qassimi (born 1940), Emirati businessman and royal
- Faisal bin Thani bin Faisal Al Thani, Qatari politician
- Faisal bin Turki Al Busaidi (1864–1913), Omani Sultan
- Faisal bin Turki Al Saud (1785–1865) (1785–1865), Saudi politician and royal
- Faisal bin Turki Al Saud (born 1975) (born 1975), Saudi royal
- Faisal bin Turki I Al Saud (1920–1968), Saudi royal
- Faisal bin Turki Al Saud (1785–1865) (1785–1865), Saudi royal
- Faisal Al Sayegh (born 1961), Lebanese politician
- Faisal Shahzad (born 1979), Pakistani-American terrorist
- Faisal Shaikh (born 1977), Indian cricketer
- Faisal Al-Shalan (born 1987), Saudi equestrian rider
- Faisal Bin Shamlan (1934–2010), Yemeni intellectual and politician
- Faisal Shboul, Jordanian politician
- Faisal Ahmed Shitol (born 1996), Bangladeshi footballer
- Faisal Shuaib, Nigerian medical doctor
- Faisal Sorour (born 1996), Kuwaiti Paralympic athlete
- Faisal Al-Subiani (born 2003), Saudi footballer
- Faisal Subzwari (born 1975), Pakistani politician
- Faisal Sultan, Pakistani physician and politician
- Faisal Khan Tarakai, Pakistani politician
- Faisal Tehrani (born 1974), Malaysian author and playwright
- Faisal Vawda (born 1974), Pakistani politician and businessman
- Faisal Yousef (born 1996), Emirati footballer
- Faisal Zakaria (born 1973), Sudanese kickboxer
- Faisal Zaman, Pakistani politician
- Faisal Zayid (born 1991), Kuwaiti footballer
- Faisal Zeb, Pakistani politician

=== Faisel ===
- Faisel Al-Jamaan (born 1986), Saudi footballer
- Faisel Al-Kharaa (born 1993), Saudi footballer
- Faisel Al-Khodaim (born 1988), Emirati footballer
- Faisel Majrashi (born 1984), Saudi footballer
- Faisel Masrahi (born 1993), Saudi footballer

=== Faissal ===
- Faissal El Bakhtaoui (born 1992), French footballer
- Faissal Boulakjar (born 1979), Moroccan-Dutch politician
- Faissal Ebnoutalib (born 1970), Moroccan-German taekwondo practitioner
- Faissal Mannai (born 1996), French-Tunisian footballer
- Faissal Al Mazyani (born 2005), Belgian-Moroccan footballer
- Faissal Shaheen, Saudi nephrologist
- Faissal Sam Shaib, Lebanese-American screenwriter and producer

=== Faycal ===
- Faycal Ben Amara (born 1970), Tunisian volleyball player
- Faycal Bousbiat (born 1970), Canadian judoka
- Faycal Gharzouli (born 1970), Algerian volleyball player
- Faycal Laridhi (born 1962), Tunisian volleyball player
- Faycal Rherras (born 1993), Belgian-Moroccan footballer
- Faycal Tellouche (born 1968), Algerian volleyball player

=== Fayçal ===
- Fayçal Azizi (born 1986), Moroccan actor and singer-songwriter
- Fayçal Badji (born 1974), Algerian footballer
- Fayçal Bentaleb (born 1973), Algerian politician
- Fayçal Fajr (born 1988), French-Moroccan footballer
- Fayçal Hamdani (born 1970), Algerian footballer
- Fayçal Hamza (born 1992), Algerian racing cyclist
- Fayçal Karoui (born 1971), Tunisian conductor
- Fayçal El-Khoury (born 1955), Canadian-Lebanese politician
- Fayçal Nini (born 1986), French-Algerian footballer
- Fayçal Tebbini, Tunisian politician

=== Faysal ===
- Faysal Ahmed (born 1993), Somali actor
- Faysal Ahmed (cricketer), Bangladeshi cricketer
- Faysal Ben Ahmed (born 1973), Tunisian footballer
- Faysal Arslan (1941–2009), Lebanese prince
- Faysal Bettache (born 2000), English footballer
- Faysal El Idrissi (born 1977), French-Moroccan footballer
- Faysal Aziz Khan (born 1974), Pakistani journalist
- Faysal Quraishi (born 1973), Pakistani actor and television host
- Faysal Sarıyıldız (born 1975), Turkish politician
- Faysal Sawadogo (born 1996), Burkinabe taekwondo practitioner
- Faysal al-Shaabi (1935–1970), Yemeni politician
- Faysal Shayesteh (born 1991), Afghan footballer
- Faysal Sohail (born 1963), American venture capitalist
- Faysal Soysal (born 1979), Turkish poet and film director
- Faysal Ali Warabe (born 1948), Somali engineer and politician
- Faysal Ahmad Ali al-Zahrani (born 1986), Saudi terrorist

=== Fayssal ===
- Fayssal Abbas (1955–2022), Syrian politician
- Fayssal Bazzi (born 1982), Lebanese-Australian actor

=== Feisal ===
- Feisal Eusoff (born 1967), Bruneian footballer
- Feisal al-Istrabadi (born 1962), Iraqi lawyer and diplomat
- Feisal G. Mohamed, American scholar, critic, and essayist
- Feisal Abdul Rauf (born 1948), Egyptian-American Sufi imam, author, and activist
- Feisal Salum (born 1998), Tanzanian footballer
- Feisal Tanjung (1939–2013), Indonesian Army general

=== Foysal ===
- Foysal Ahmed Fahim (born 2002), Bangladeshi footballer

== Places ==
- Faisal Cantonment, a cantonment town in Karachi, Pakistan
- Faisal Colony, a neighbourhood of New Karachi Town in Karachi, Pakistan.
- Faisal Equestrian Club, an equestrian club and restaurant in Gaza
- Faisal Town, a residential area of Lahore
- King Faisal Mosque (disambiguation)
  - Faisal Mosque in Islamabad, Pakistan
  - King Faisal Mosque, Sharjah, United Arab Emirates

== Other uses ==
- Faisal (film), a 2017 Indian film retitled Rubaai
- Faysal Bank, a bank based in Pakistan
- Feisal F.C., an association football club based in Mombasa, Kenya

== See also ==
- Fadhil
- Fazal
- Faisalabad, a city in Punjab, Pakistan
