= Fazal =

Fazal or Fazl (Arabic: فضل) is an Arabic given name meaning grace. Notable people with the name include:

== Given name ==
- Fazal Isaq A practising corporate lawyer qualified in the jurisdiction of England and Wales.
- Abul Fazal Muhammad Ahsanuddin Chowdhury or A. F. M. Ahsanuddin Chowdhury (1915–2001), the ninth President of the People's Republic of Bangladesh
- Abul Fazal (writer) (1903–1983), Bangladeshi author and novelist
- Abu'l-Fazl ibn Mubarak (1551–1602), the vizier of the great Mughal emperor Akbar
- Azra Fazal Peechoho or Azra Peechoho (born 1953), politician and physician in Sindh, Pakistan
- Fazal Akbar (1903–??), sixth Chief Justice of Pakistan
- Fazal Ali (1886–1959), governor of Assam and Orissa, and a judge
- Fazal Ali Qureshi (died 1935), Islamic scholar and the leading Naqshbandi shaikh of colonial India in the early twentieth century
- Fazal Dad Khan (1929–1999), Pakistani politician born in Dagai
- Fazal Dad Khan Dagai (1929–1999), activist of the Pakistan freedom movement
- Fazal Din (1921–1945), Punjabi Muslim recipient of the Victoria Cross
- Fazal Wahid (1858–1937), a Pashtun freedom fighter against the British Raj
- Fazal Haq Khaliqyar (1934–2004), Afghan politician, briefly Chairman of the Council of Ministers
- Fazal Haq Mujahid (born 1954), Mujahideen commander during the Soviet war in Afghanistan
- Fazal Hayat (1974–2018), leader of a banned Pakistani militant group
- Fazal Ilahi Chaudhry (1904–1982), the fifth President of Pakistan
- Fazal Inayat-Khan (1942–1990), also known as Frank Kevlin, son of Hidayat Inayat Khan, grandson of Hazrat Inayat Khan
- Fazal Khan, Pakistani lawyer and Pashtun human rights activist
- Fazal Khan Changawi (1868–1938), Punjabi writer of numerous books on Islam
- Fazal Mahmood (1927–2005), Pakistani cricketer
- Fazal Mohammad, citizen of Afghanistan and formerly a Taliban militia commander
- Fazal Nawaz Jung (1894–1964), Hyderabadi politician and financier
- Fazal Niyazai (born 1990), Afghan cricketer
- Fazl ur Rahman (disambiguation), several people
- Fazal Shah, member of National Assembly from Khairpur District, Sindh, Pakistan
- Fazal Shah Sayyad (1827–1890), Punjabi poet known for his qisse (long poems) on tragic romances
- Fazal Sheikh (born 1965), American photographer
- Fazal-e-Haq or Fazle Haq (1928–1991), high-ranking general in the Pakistan Army

== Surname ==
- Ali Fazal (born 1986), Indian actor in movies and on stage
- Anwar Fazal (born 1941), Malaysian grassroots environmental activist
- Faiz Fazal, full name Faiz Yakub Fazal, (born 1985), Indian cricketer
- Hussein Fazal, Canadian-born American entrepreneur
- Mohammed Fazal (1922–2014), Governor of Maharashtra 2002–2004
- Said Fazal Akbar, the first Governor of Kunar province in Afghanistan after the fall of the Taliban in 2001
- Sohail Fazal (born 1967), Pakistani cricketer who played two ODIs in 1989
- Zahid Fazal (born 1973), Pakistani cricketer

== See also ==
- Fazal Ali Commission
- Fazal Katchh
- Fazal Mosque
- Fazal-e-amal
- Tando Fazal
- Faisal (disambiguation)
- Fazuul
