= KAICIID Dialogue Centre =

Inter-governmental organization

King Abdullah bin Abdulaziz International Centre for Interreligious and Intercultural Dialogue
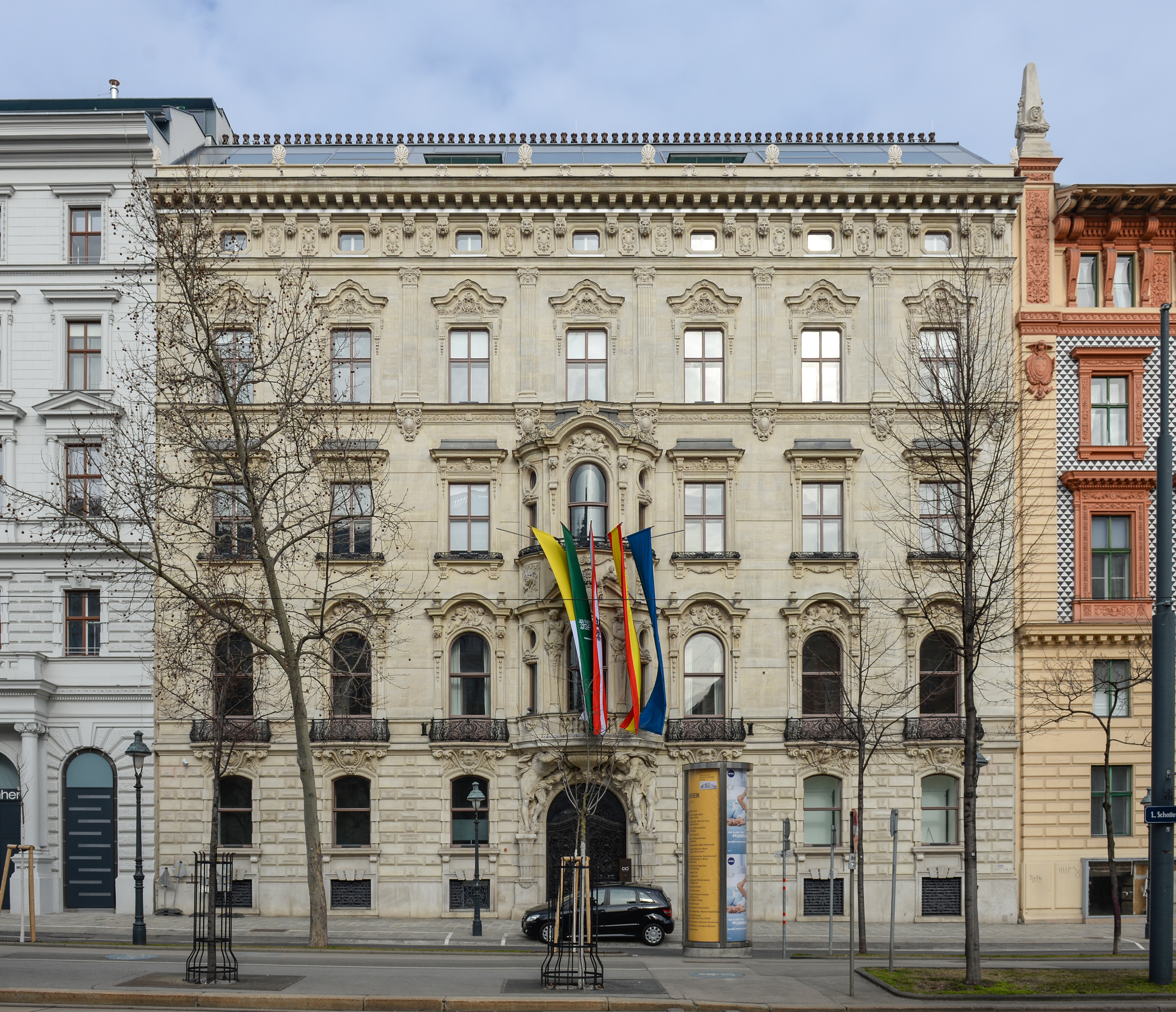
- Founded: November 2012
- Founder: Kingdom of Saudi Arabia, Republic of Austria and Kingdom of Spain
- Type: Intergovernmental Organization, International UN-recognised Organization
- Purpose: Peacebuilding, social cohesion, interfaith and cultural dialogue, justice, human rights, reconciliation, human dignity, religious education
- Headquarters: Lisbon, Portugal
- Location: Rua Castilho 52, 1250-071 Lisbon
- Region served: Global
- Method: Convener, dialogue forum, acting as a knowledge hub, empowering other organisations already working in the field of dialogue, partnership, information exchange
- Key people: King Abdullah of Saudi Arabia; Dr. Zuhair Alharthi: Secretary-General
- Employees: 50, when fully staffed, in Lisbon
- Website: www.kaiciid.org

The King Abdullah bin Abdulaziz International Centre for Interreligious and Intercultural Dialogue, mostly referred to as "The International Dialogue Centre – KAICIID" and globally known by its abbreviation, KAICIID, is an inter-governmental organization that promotes interreligious and intercultural dialogue to prevent and resolve conflict. It was established in Vienna, Austria, but relocated to Lisbon, Portugal on 1 July 2022.

KAICIID was opened in 2012 by the Kingdom of Saudi Arabia, the Republic of Austria and the Kingdom of Spain, following the initiative of Pope Benedict XVI and King Abdullah of the Kingdom of Saudi Arabia who met in 2007 to discuss the founding of a new interfaith activity. The Holy See is a founding observer. The centre and its mission have been endorsed by many religious leaders and high-level politicians, including the Viennese Community Rabbi Schlomo Hofmeister, the Archbishop of Vienna, Christoph Schönborn, and the former Austrian President Heinz Fischer. In 2021, Austrian media outlets reported that Japan, Argentina, Morocco, Indonesia and Canada were reportedly considering to join the organization as new member states.

== Mission and objectives ==
The International Dialogue Centre (KAICIID) is an intergovernmental organization that is now headquartered in Lisbon, Portugal. Before July 2022, the organization had been headquartered in Vienna, Austria since its foundation in 2012. The mandate of KAICIID is to foster interreligious and intercultural dialogue around the world by bringing religious leaders and political decision-makers together to develop and implement multilateral solutions that promote social cohesion and interreligious understanding.

KAICIID is the only intergovernmental organization governed by religious representatives from all of the world's major religions. It is characterized by a dual governance structure, which includes a Council of Parties and a Board of Directors. The mission of the organization is to promote peace, tolerance and understanding among people of different faiths and cultures. KAICIID's work includes the use of dialogue to fight hate speech, support peacebuilding and social cohesion efforts in conflict areas around the globe. The Centre runs focus region programmes in Nigeria, the Central African Republic, Europe and the Arab world. The centre was also active in Myanmar, but ceased to implement its programmes there in 2021.

Crucially, KAICIID seeks to promote human rights, justice, peace and reconciliation, as well as curb the abuse of religion as a means to justify oppression, violence and conflict. It promotes the preservation and sacredness of holy sites, as well as respect for religious symbols, and focuses on issues pertaining to the dignity of human life and religious education. In Europe, KAICIID also works in the field of refugee and migrant inclusion and has cooperated with Caritas and Human Relief on a project level. In 2019, KAICIID announced that it will allocate approximately €1.5 million for initiatives aimed at combating "hate speech" through the centre's global programmes in 2020.

== Guiding principles ==
Recalling that the founding document of KAICIID cites principles enshrined in the Universal Declaration of Human Rights, especially, "the right to freedom of thought, conscience and religion" – with emphasis on "human rights and fundamental freedoms for all without distinction as to race, sex, language or religion."

== History ==
=== Establishment ===
On 13 October 2011 the "Agreement for the establishment of KAICIID" in Vienna was signed by the governments of Austria, Spain and Saudi Arabia. Madrid, London and Geneva had also applied as host cities, but Vienna eventually won the bid. The center was inaugurated on 27 November 2012 in Vienna, in a ceremony attended by representatives of the world's major religions. UN Secretary General Ban Ki-moon spoke at the inauguration and welcomed the initiative., stating: "I believe so deeply in this Centre’s vision to advance respect for human dignity and human rights, foster mutual respect and generate cooperation for justice, reconciliation and peace". The offices of the organization were based inside the Palais Sturany on Vienna's Ringstraße before it relocated to Lisbon on 1 July 2022. The Kingdom of Saudi Arabia purchased the historical building for 13.4 million Euros in 2011 and also paid for the renovation of the Palais before KAICIID was opened.

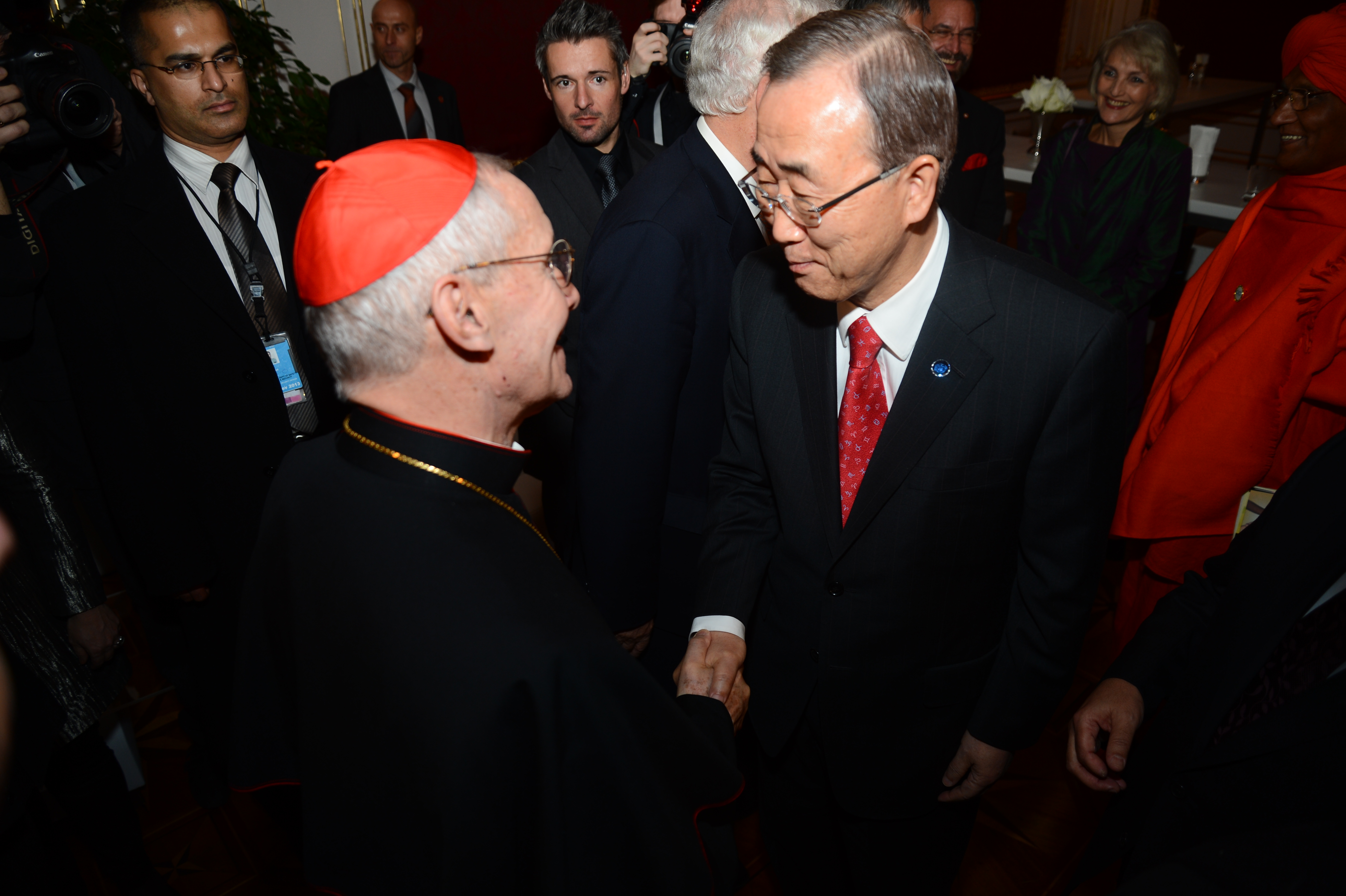
UN Secretary General Ban-Ki Moon visits Vienna on the occasion of KAICIID's inauguration ceremony

KAICIID's inauguration ceremony was protested by the Austrian Green Party, as well as a variety of Austrian NGOs concerned with Saudi Arabia's poor human-rights record and fears that the KAICIID would in fact be misused by founding member and chief financier Saudi Arabia as a bridge-head for spreading Wahhabism in Europe. The far-right Freedom Party (FPÖ) also opposed the establishment of the Centre in Vienna. However, others have argued that the centre has lived up to its mission by fostering interreligious dialogue, in particular between Jews and Muslims, in a way that would have not been possible in the Kingdom of Saudi Arabia itself. In 2020, Rabbi David Rosen, a board member of KAICIID and an Israeli citizen, became the first Jewish Rabbi in history to meet with the King of Saudi Arabia, King Salman Ibn Abdulaziz Al-Saud, in the Saudi capital. The meeting took place as part of KAICIID's 22nd regular session of the board of directors.

In 2015, a coalition quarrel broke out over the Centre between the Social Democratic Party (SPÖ) and the Austrian People's Party (ÖVP). Both parties had voted in favour of hosting the intergovernmental organization in Austria. The former Austrian Chancellor Werner Faymann (SPÖ) urged KAICIID to "speak out" against human rights violations in Saudi Arabia and called for an "orderly withdrawal" from the intergovernmental organization should this not happen. However, as an intergovernmental organization, the Centre does not have the mandate to comment on national policy in any country, including, but not limited to its member states. In response to Werner Faymann's remarks, Vice-Chancellor Reinhold Mitterlehner (ÖVP) referred to the attacks on KAICIID as a "campaign" that is "harmful to Austria". "The mandate of the Centre is to foster interreligious dialogue. It was not established to comment on the human rights situation in its member states", he said, referring to the fact that KAICIID is an intergovernmental organization. He added that the accusations brought forward against KAICIID were unjustified. Mitterlehner also warned Faymann of "breaking international law", should he proceed with his plans to close KAICIID.

The Vatican has defended the organization as an international initiative, said that "the variety and pluralism of today’s world call for a multiplication of both chances for and vectors of development of the active and proactive role of the Church", and promised "to bring to light her concerns for the effective respect of the fundamental rights of Christians who live in countries with a Muslim majority, in order to promote authentic and integral religious liberty.".

Austria's former President Heinz Fischer has frequently defended the work of KAICIID and also delivered a keynote speech at a KAICIID conference in Vienna in 2019. "It is not enough to constantly refer to ourselves as bridge builders, or as those who support dialogue, but when such a prominent opportunity to build bridges arises, we decide to stop instead of crossing it", he stated in an interview with the Austrian broadcaster ORF in 2019. Fischer also referred to Austria's position with regards to KAICIID as "inconsistent". He was criticised for defending the centre by the FPÖ's far-right leader Herbert Kickl.

The Austrian journalist and MENA region expert Gudrun Harrer ("Der Standard") criticised Austria's decision to "drop" KAICIID, referring to it as "not a particularly glorious chapter in the history of Austrian foreign policy". In another Op-Ed, she referred to Austria's decision as "self-destructive" and "incomprehensible". Fritz Edlinger, Secretary General of the Austrian Society of Austrian-Arab relations, also criticised Austria's position, arguing that he considers protests against human rights violations as "appropriate", but saying they should much rather be taken to the Saudi embassy instead. "If any criticism is justified, then it should be criticism of the Austrian government, because it was the Austrians who once pushed hard to bring this organization to Vienna in the first place", he added.

=== Parliamentary Motion ===
KAICIID's headquarters were moved to Lisbon, Portugal as per 1 July 2022. Austrian media outlets have reported that once KAICIID has relocated its offices to Portugal, the Saudi Arabian embassy will most likely move into Palais Sturany. Austria's parliament backed a motion in June 2019 calling on the Austrian government to quit the headquarters treaty on which KAICIID is based and to revoke an agreement that bases it in the Austrian capital. Over the years, the organization frequently faced criticism in Austria over the fact that it is funded by Saudi Arabia. The parliamentary motion was adopted during a period in which Austria was led by an interim government. In these "freewheeling conditions", the Parliament passed the motion to close KAICIID, which was tabled by Peter Pilz / "Liste Pilz" and saw the support of all other parties except the ÖVP. Austria's Minister of Foreign Affairs, Alexander Schallenberg, declared that he would bring that motion into effect.

The parliamentary motion was harshly criticised by civil society organizations, religious groups and prominent figures, including the former Austrian President Heinz Fischer, the AJC's International Director of Interreligious Affairs, Rabbi David Rosen, the Secretary-General of the World Organization of the Scout Movement, Ahmad Alhendawi, and the European Muslim-Jewish Leadership Council (MJLC). The Austrian activist and author Heather Wokush published an article headlined "Closing KAICIID, silencing dialogue", in which she wrote: "In essence, shutting down Austrian-based organizations with ties to nations supporting capital punishment is one thing; selective application of that principle is another". Political observers and diplomats have argued that KAICIID became "the victim of a shifting political climate in Austria" and that the move threatens to undermine Austria's status as a centre for international diplomacy and de facto destination for international organizations. Austrian President Alexander Van der Bellen lamented the closure of KAICIID in Vienna. Van der Bellen stated that KAICIID "did good work in the field of interreligious dialogue", but criticized that the organization failed to communicate that well enough. The Austrian broadsheet "Die Presse" expressed concerns over Austria's reliability as an international partner and seat of intergovernmental organizations, fearing that Saudi Arabia could even push for the relocation of OPEC as a retaliatory measure. Paul Zulehner, an Austrian theologian and the former Dean of the Faculty for Catholic Theology at the University of Vienna, has referred to KAICIID's closure as a "big mistake".

=== Relocation to Portugal ===
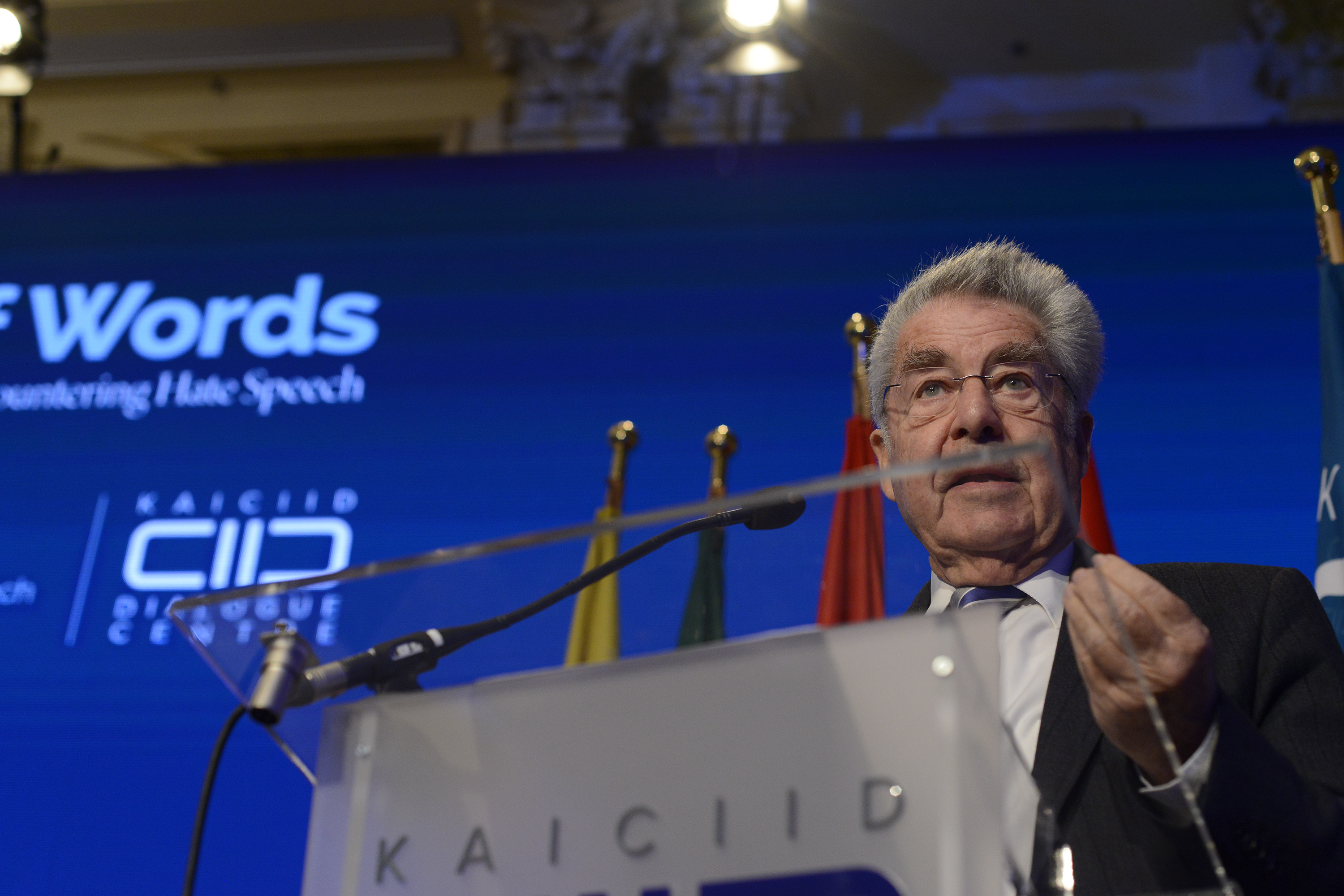
The former Austrian President Heinz Fischer speaks at KAICIID's "The Power of Words" conference in Vienna, Austria

On 29 October 2021, KAICIID's former Secretary General, Faisal bin Muaammar, and the Portuguese Minister of State for Foreign Affairs, Augusto Santos Silva, signed the organization's new Seat Agreement in Lisbon. The agreement foresees the organization's relocation from Vienna to Lisbon in the course of 2022. In his speech at the signing ceremony, the Portuguese Minister referred to KAICIID's work as "indispensable". Santo Silva stated: “KAICIID has a mission: to provide conditions to implement and promote interreligious and intercultural dialogue. This is one of the main tasks we are committed to. Difficulties in dialogue between different religions are a threat to our community and a challenge that we have to respond to". With the transfer of the centre's headquarters to Lisbon, Portugal will host nine international organizations. Before Lisbon was announced as KAICIID's new host country, Austrian media outlets had also speculated that the centre could move to Geneva. Ms. Elham Alshejni served as KAICIID's interim Deputy Secretary-General until the end of September 2022. On 16 September 2022, following the unanimous decision by its Council of Parties, KAICIID announced its new leadership for the next 4 years.

Zuhair Alharthi, a Saudi journalist and political analyst, is now serving as the centre's new Secretary General, while Ambassador António de Almeida-Ribeiro, a Portuguese career diplomat, was appointed Deputy Secretary General. KAICIID's new leadership took office on 1 October 2022. As a journalist, the current Secretary General of KAICIID repeatedly defended the death penalty in the Kingdom of Saudi Arabia, referring to any criticism as being selective, uninformed, and targeting Sharia laws. He refers to the death penalty as a "divine instruction" and argues that laws in America are "made by human beings", while Saudi laws are based on divine texts. He also justifies the death penalty by citing cultural differences, arguing that while Western societies may view it as a human rights violation, it is deeply rooted in the cultural beliefs of Muslim communities.

== Programmatic Work ==
KAICIID's programmes focus on facilitating intercultural and interreligious dialogue in different countries around the globe, particularly through religious higher education and leadership. The organization is active in multiple countries around the world, but places a particular programmatic emphasis on Asia, Africa (Nigeria, Central African Republic), the Arab region, and Europe. KAICIID established five "dialogue platforms" in these focus regions to foster the use of interreligious cooperation as a counterweight to the manipulation of religion for violent ends. In these focus regions, KAICIID works together with civil society, faith-based and non-governmental organizations to address issues such as hate speech prevention, inclusive education and the protection of religious sites. Institutional partners that KAICIID has worked together with in the implementation of its programmes include the United Nations Alliance of Civilizations (UNAOC), Caritas, Religions for Peace, the OSCE Office for Democratic Institutions and Human Rights (ODIHR), and the World Organization of the Scout Movement.

=== Fellows Programme ===
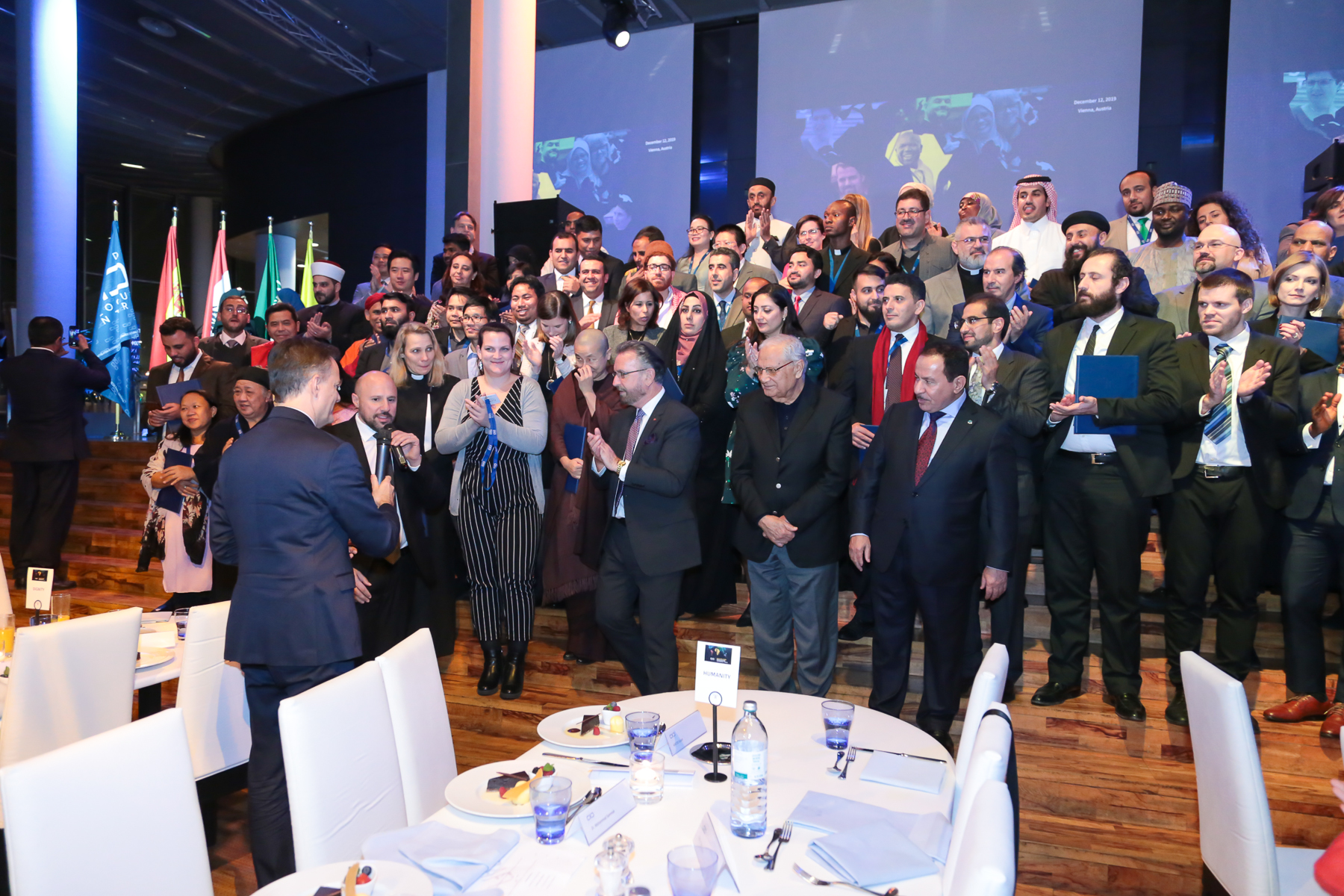
The KAICIID Fellows of 2019 celebrate their graduation in Vienna, Austria

The KAICIID Fellows Programme is the flagship program of the Centre, and was launched in 2015. It offers a one-year, non-residential training and capacity building program aimed at those who teach future religious leaders (i.e., seminary professors and the equivalent), other academics, religious leaders, peace practitioners, and policy makers. The program trains them in dialogue, mediation, and peacebuilding, so they can pass along these skills to their students.

The Programme is designed to connect and cultivate a network of leaders committed to fostering peace in their communities through interreligious and intercultural dialogue. Since its inception in 2015, the Programme has seen more than 500 participants from 93 different countries, and twenty different religions, with a variety of denominations within each represented. Fellows can be part of the international or regional cohorts including the Arab Region, Africa, Europe, South and South-east Asia, and Latin America.

=== Africa ===
The most active programmes in Africa to date focus on Nigeria and the Central African Republic, but has included projects in more than twenty countries. Focusing on the healing of religious and ethnic divisions in Africa, KAICIID convenes community leaders from the major religious traditions (Christian, Muslim, and traditional) to work together for peace. This includes support of the African Union on issues such as the protection of sacred sites; and work to build partnerships between policymakers and religious actors toward the achievement of Agenda 2063 and the United Nations Sustainable Development Goals (SDGs). KAICIID and the AU have established the AU Interfaith Dialogue Forum (AU-IFDF).

=== Arab Region ===
KAICIID also works extensively in the Arab world, and Fellows from the Arab region constitute the largest single regional and linguistic representation. It established the "Interreligious Platform for Dialogue and Cooperation in the Arab World" (IPDC) in 2018 in cooperation with 23 Arab religious leaders from different religious backgrounds. The platform serves as a permanent link between religious leaders and their communities in the region, through which they collaborate on initiatives aimed at promoting dialogue, preventing conflict, and resolving existing challenges. In an effort to fight hate speech, KAICIID funds the “Social Media as a Space for Dialogue programme” in different Arab countries, which has equipped more than 700 young people with skills to combat online hate speech and extremism. KAICIID is also financing a year-long fellowship programme to train journalists in interreligious dialogue awareness.

=== Asia ===
South Asia is home to some of the most religiously diverse countries in the world. KAICIID facilitates exchanges among religious leaders and faith-based organizations in South and South-East Asia, designed to help communities find common solutions to shared problems, such as violent extremism, intercommunal conflict, marginalisation and displacement. KAICIID has also convened Buddhist and Muslim leaders to engage in dialogues addressing hate speech, protection of holy sites, and inclusive education. The Centre partners with the Association of Southeast Asian Nations (ASEAN) Institute for Peace and Reconciliation, equipping religious leaders and policymakers with dialogue skills. KAICIID has also supported the ASEAN Youth Interfaith Camp.

=== Europe ===
In Europe, KAICIID works mainly in the field of refugee and migrant inclusion, hate speech prevention and the strengthening of social cohesion. The Europe programme of the centre is structured across three pillars: the "People Seeking Refuge in Europe" subprogramme, the "Social Cohesion Initiative" and the "Regional Collaboration and Networking Programme". The programme is designed to bring together religious leaders and policymakers in joint efforts which address some of the European continent's most pressing problems: the need for inclusive education for, and with refugees and migrants; the need for investigating and strengthening ways in which European leaders can act to protect religious minorities, and the provision of capacity-building tools for religious leaders and faith-based organizations to build up resilience, address and prevent hate speech and hate crime in Europe. In Europe, KAICIID co-established the "Muslim-Jewish Leadership Council" (MJLC), a platform that brings together Muslim and Jewish religious leaders from Europe., as well as the Network for Dialogue, a pan-European network that connects faith and civil society actors to promote the use of dialogue and develop recommendations for the social inclusion of migrants and refugees in Europe.

In October 2021, KAICIID hosted the 3rd edition of the "European Policy Dialogue Forum on Refugees and Migrants" in Lisbon, Portugal, in partnership with the European Council of Religious Leaders/Religions for Peace Europe (ECRL/RfP Europe) and with the support of the OSCE's Office for Democratic Institutions and Human Rights (ODIHR). The conference was the first major on-site event that KAICIID hosted in its future host country, Portugal. It saw the participation of the Portuguese Minister of Foreign Affairs, Augusto Santos Silva., who delivered a keynote speech.

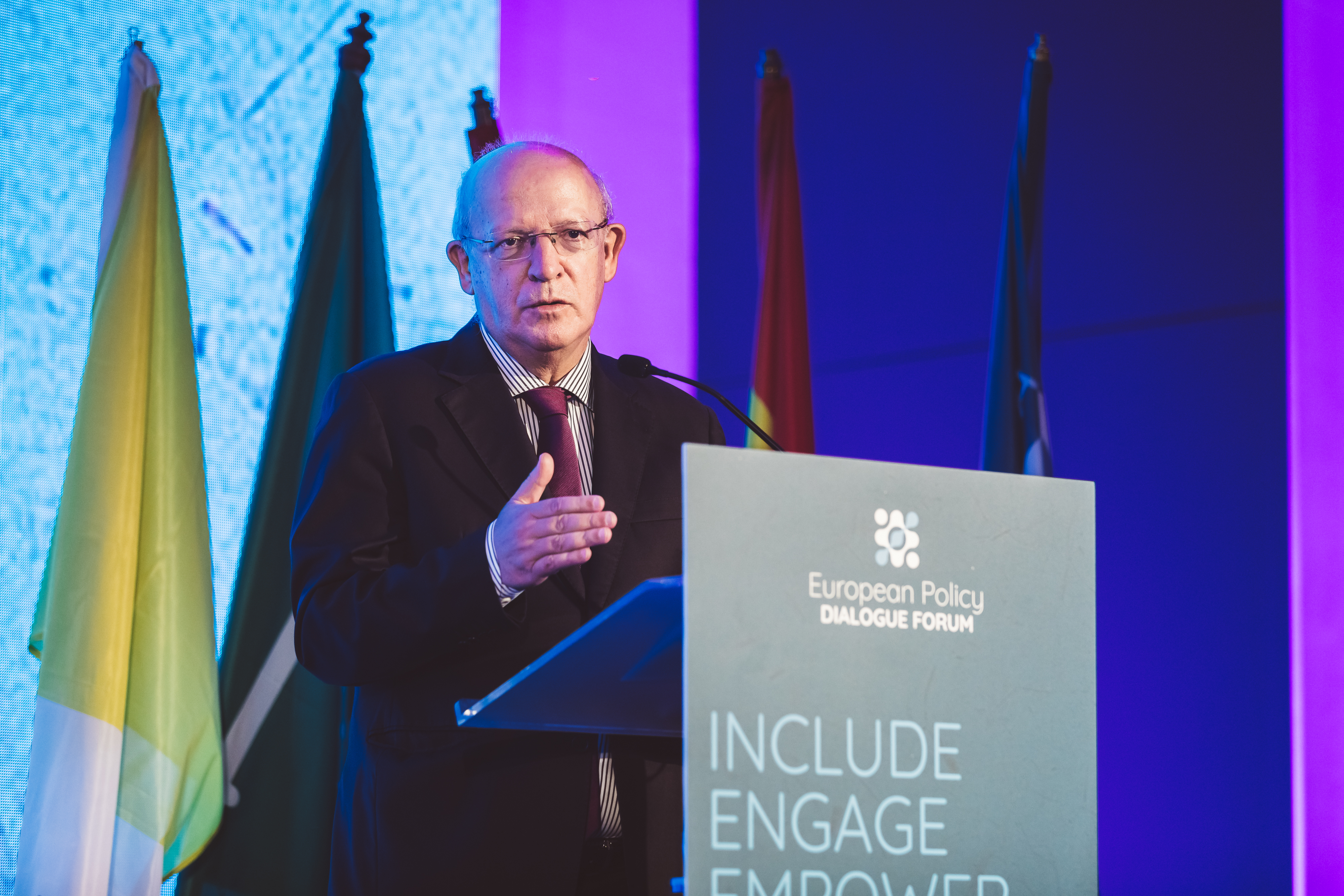
The FM of Portugal, Augusto Santos Silva, speaks at KAICIID forum in Lisbon, Portugal

=== Conferences ===
Since its establishment, KAICIID has hosted multiple conferences around the globe, bringing together policymakers and religious leaders from different faith groups. In November 2014, KAICIID hosted a conference in Vienna of Muslim, Christian and Jewish religious leaders from across the Middle East and around the world to join in respect for tolerance and diversity, denouncing violence in the name of religion. In 2019, the organization organized a conference in Vienna themed "The Power of Words – The Role of Religion, Media, and Policy in Countering Hate Speech”, which brought close to 200 faith leaders, policymakers, civil society representatives, educators and dialogue practitioners to discuss ways of preventing and countering the phenomenon of hate speech. Adama Dieng, in his role as UN Special Adviser on the Prevention of Genocide, delivered a keynote speech at the conference.

In 2020, KAICIID co-hosted the G20 Interfaith Forum ahead of the G20 Summit. The G20 Interfaith Forum is an annual platform that brings together religious leaders, policymakers, and diverse faith actors to collaborate on global agendas, within the framework of the United Nations Sustainable Development Goals (SDGs). The conference was organized in cooperation with the United Nations Alliance of Civilizations (UNAOC).

The Centre has convened, irregularly, a Global Forum of top religious leaders and academics to examine a series of topics, starting with a 2013 Global Forum on Education, up to the most recent, May 2024 Global Forum on Transformative Dialogue.

=== Scouting ===
As part of the Centre's commitment to capacity building through partnerships, one of the most successful programmes to come as a result is the partnership with the World Organization of the Scout Movement, by designing the Dialogue for Peace programme, an training program in interreligious and intercultural dialogue skills and comparative religion knowledge for Scouts and Scouters around the world.

=== E-Learning and online resources ===
KACIID also sponsors a central 'Knowledge Hub', a collection of recorded webinars, self-paced e-learning courses, a global networking platform Connect2Dialogue, and a Peace Map which shows the range of interreligious activities by international organisations across the world in a central online location.

== Governance ==
A unique dual governance structure includes a Council of Parties made of sovereign states, and a Board of Directors made of representatives of major world religions.

The Council of Parties consists of:

- The Kingdom of Saudi Arabia
- The Kingdom of Spain
- The Republic of Austria
- The Holy See (as founding observer)
- The Republic of Portugal has been invited to join, in November 2024

The Board of Directors includes representatives from five world religions: Judaism, Christianity, Islam, Hinduism, and Buddhism. As of 1 August 2024, the Board of Directors includes:

- Metropolitan Emmanuel Adamakis (Orthodox Christian), chair
- Sheikh Mohamad al-Arefe (Sunni Muslim)
- Imam Abdel-Wahab Ahmed Hassan Taha Al-Sammerai (Sunni Muslim)
- Rev. Laurent Basanese (Catholic Christian)
- Rev. Rana Khan (Anglican Christian)
- Rev. Kosho Niwano (Mahayana Buddhist)
- Sheikh Allahshukur Pashazadeh (Shia Muslim)
- Tharmalingam Sasikumar (Hindu)
- Rabbi Jackie Tabick (Reform Judaism)

Former Board members are:

- Rabbi David Rosen (Jewish)
- Cardinal Miguel Ángel Ayuso Guixot (Catholic Christian)
- Rev. Richard J. Sudworth (Anglican Christian)
- Dr. Hamad Al-Majed (Sunni Muslim)
- Dr. Mohammad Sammak (Sunni Muslim)
- Dr. Kezevino Aram (Hindu)

Faisal bin Abdulrahman bin Muaammar served as the Secretary General of KAICIID until 2021.

Since then there have been an interim Secretary General for one year, a regularly appointed Secretary General, Dr. Zuhair Alharthi. who served for two years, and now an interim Secretary General, Ambassador António de Almeida-Ribeiro.
