= Jalolsavam =

2004 Indian film

- DVD cover
- Directed by: Sibi Malayil
- Written by: M. Sindhuraj
- Produced by: Shaam Jayan; K. R. Sajeev; L. Gopakumar; N. V. Swaminathan
- Starring: Kunchacko Boban; Navya Nair
- Cinematography: Venugopal Madathil
- Edited by: L. Bhoominathan
- Music by: Alphons Joseph (songs); Johnson (score)
- Production company: Great Movie Entertainer's
- Distributed by: Swami Films
- Release date: 14 April 2004
- Country: India
- Language: Malayalam

Jalolsavam (transl. Festival of water) is a 2004 Indian Malayalam-language romantic drama film directed by Sibi Malayil and written by M. Sindhuraj. The film stars Kunchacko Boban and Navya Nair, with Nedumudi Venu, Riyaz Khan, and Jagathy Sreekumar in supporting roles. The film's songs were composed by Alphons Joseph, while the background score was by Johnson.

== Plot ==
The film begins with the annual boat race at Kuttanad. Alakkal Govindan captains the boat that has won the race twice already. His dream now is to secure a hat trick of wins in the race.

His son Chandran is a pharmaceutical salesman (and part time local news reader) who falls in love with Geeta, an industrious girl in the village. After being orphaned when her parents were drowned in a boating accident, she was taken in by Pappi Amma. Ponnappan, her wastrel of a son, is a local politician and activist. He tries to get Geeta married to a Dubai returned Jose.

Chandrans father, Alakkal Govindan pledges all his properties for the final race but loses. He dies downcast and his debts and obligations fall on the innocent Chandran.

== Cast ==
- Kunchacko Boban as Alakkal Chandran
- Nedumudi Venu as Alakkal Govindanashan
- Navya Nair as Geetha
- Riyaz Khan as Dubai Jose/Cheenkanni Jose
- Jagathy Sreekumar as Ponnappan
- Jagadish as Soman
- Sujatha as Bhanumathi
- Chali Pala as Thommichayan
- Kalabhavan Prajod as Dasappan
- Sailesh Soman as Benny
- Geetha Salam as Kunjunju
- Machan Varghese as Kaali Thankan/Thankappan
- Vijaya Kumari as Pappiyamma
- Punnapra Appachan as Tea Shop Owner
- Thiruvalla Johnson as Pakida/Surendran
- KPAC Sabu as Bhaskaran

== Soundtrack ==
The film had musical score composed by Alphons Joseph. Johnson composed the background score. The lyrics were written by Vayalar Sarath Chandra Varma, Beeyar Prasad, Varun J Thilak and Suresh Madhav.

Soundtrack listing
#	Title	Music director	Lyricist	Singer(s)
1	Kanneerinte (Vaave Vaavavo) [F]	Alphons Joseph	Sarath Vayalar	Jyotsna Radhakrishnan
2	Kanneerinte (Vaave Vaavavo) [M]	Alphons Joseph	Sarath Vayalar	G Venugopal
3	Keranirakalaadum	Alphons Joseph	Beeyar Prasad	P Jayachandran
4	Kulirillam Vaazhum [D]	Alphons Joseph	Beeyar Prasad	KJ Yesudas, KS Chithra
5	Manassil	Fazal	Varun J Thilak	Varun J Thilak, Sugeetha Menon
6	Mazhamanjin Pulari	Fazal	Suresh Madhav	Franco Simon Neelankavil
7	Mizhiyile Naanam	Alphons Joseph	Sarath Vayalar	P Jayachandran, Sujatha Mohan
8	Thaarakappodi	Alphons Joseph	Beeyar Prasad	MG Sreekumar, Chorus

== Reception ==
A critic from Sify wrote that "It is a predictable tearjerker which has no major twists and the screenplay goes awry. The songs are very mediocre and the picturisation is a total let down". A critic from Indiaglitz wrote that "Jalolsavam is diluted and watery".

== Legacy ==
In mid-2024, the film became the subject of a series of internet memes centered around the character of Dubai Jose, played by Riyaz Khan. The character's catchphrase, "Ellarum adich keri vaa!"(English transl. everybody come on with a bang), received newfound attention, with several memes circulating around the social media platforms Instagram and Facebook. Thus the character received a cult status.
