= Faisal bin Abdulrahman bin Muaammar =

Saudi Arabian politician

- Born: 11 January 1959 (1 Rajab 1378 AH); Sadus, Saudi Arabia
- Education: King Saud University
- Known for: Secretary General of King Abdullah bin Abdulaziz International Centre for Interreligious and Intercultural Dialogue (KAICIID)

Faisal bin Abdulrahman bin Muaammar (Arabic: فيصل بن عبد الرحمن بن معمر) is the founding Secretary General of the King Abdullah bin Abdulaziz International Centre for Interreligious and Intercultural Dialogue (KAICIID, based in Vienna) and the King Abdulaziz Center for National Dialogue (KACND, based in Riyadh). He is also Supervisor General of the King Abdulaziz Public Library (KAPL, based in Riyadh).

== Education ==
Faisal bin Muaammar received his early education in Sadus, Saudi Arabia. After obtaining a bachelor's degree in Sociology from the University of Riyadh (now known as King Saud University), he joined the Saudi International Scholarship Program and was sponsored by the Saudi Arabian National Guard to attend graduate school in the US. He earned his master's degree in Management from Webster University in St. Louis in 1985.

== Career ==
Since the mid-1980s, bin Muaammar has been associated with the fields of dialogue, culture and education in Saudi Arabia, pursuing the principles of coexistence by deepening knowledge and mutual understanding among diverse communities.

Bin Muaammar has served on the boards of a number of organizations whose mandate is to enhance education and inter-group understanding. Currently, he serves on the Boards of the King Abdul Aziz Foundation for Human Sciences and Islamic Studies (Morocco); the King Fahad National Library; the Administration Authority of the National Center for Documents and Archives; the Forum of Promoting Peace in Muslim Societies (United Arab Emirates); the World Scout Foundation (Switzerland), the King Abdul Aziz Foundation for Research and Archives, the National Committee for Monitoring the Custodian of the Two Holy Mosques King Abdullah bin Abdulaziz Interreligious and Intercultural Dialogue Initiatives and the UNESCO Institute for Lifelong Learning.

=== Interreligious and Intercultural Dialogue ===
KAICIID is the world's first intergovernmental organization whose mission is to build peace through dialogue among world religions. The Centre is supported by a unique two-tier governance structure that connects government representatives (the Council of Parties, comprising the Kingdom of Saudi Arabia, the Republic of Austria and the Kingdom of Spain, as well as the Holy See, as Founding Observer) with religious leaders (the Board of Directors) who represent faith-based institutions. Bin Muaammar was appointed Secretary General of KAICIID in 2012. His term was renewed in 2016.

Similarly, KACND, an independent Saudi Arabian organization of which bin Muaammar is also Secretary General, works to enhance dialogue among Saudi citizens from different intra-religious and societal backgrounds.

=== Knowledge Building ===
Faisal bin Abdulrahman bin Muaammar is also Supervisor General of the King Abdulaziz Public Library (KAPL, based in Riyadh), founded in 1987. The library mainly covers Arabic Islamic Heritage. In 2006, bin Muaammar was behind the initiative to create the library's Arabic Union Catalog (AUC). In addition to having a branch in Morocco, a third branch of the King Abdulaziz Library was opened at Beijing University in the Chinese capital in 2017.

All three libraries develop collections and diversify knowledge resources, providing reader and researcher programs, in addition to hosting workshops, lectures, seminars and local and international symposiums.

From 1996 to 2003 bin Muaammar was the Vice Chair of the Executive Committee for the National Heritage and Culture Festival (the Janadriyah Festival).

=== Roles in the Saudi Arabian Government ===
In 1985, bin Muaammar had served as general manager of the Civilian Training Department of the Saudi Arabian National Guard, a role he left to work on the KAPL project under appointment of Crown Prince Abdullah bin Abdulaziz Al Saud. In 1996, he returned as the Undersecretary of the National Guard's Educational and Cultural Affairs Department.

In 2003, he became advisor to the Court of Crown Prince Abdullah bin Abdulaziz.

Bin Muaammar also served as Vice Minister of Education in Saudi Arabia from 2009–2011. He serves as advisor to the Custodian of the Two Holy Mosques.
