= King Faisal Mosque =

King Faisal Mosque may refer to:

- Faisal Mosque in Islamabad, Pakistan
- King Faisal Mosque, Sharjah, United Arab Emirates

== See also ==
- Faisal (disambiguation)
- King Faisal (disambiguation)
