= Kilichundan Mampazham =

- Directed by: Priyadarshan
- Written by: Priyadarshan
- Story by: Sreenivasan
- Produced by: Antony Perumbavoor
- Starring: Mohanlal; Soundarya; Sreenivasan; Thilakan; Cochin Haneefa; Salim Kumar
- Cinematography: Ravi Varman
- Edited by: N. Gopalakrishnan
- Music by: Vidyasagar
- Production company: Aashirvad Cinemas
- Distributed by: Johny Sagariga
- Release date: 11 April 2003
- Running time: 148 minutes
- Country: India
- Language: Malayalam

Kilichundan Mampazham (Malayalam: Bird-beaked Mango) is a 2003 Indian Malayalam-language romantic comedy film written and directed by Priyadarshan from a story by Sreenivasan. It was produced by Antony Perumbavoor under the company Aashirvad Cinemas. The film stars Mohanlal, Soundarya (in her final Malayalam film), Sreenivasan, Thilakan, Cochin Haneefa, Salim Kumar. Vineeth Sreenivasan debuted as a singer in the film.

== Plot ==
Moidukutty Haji returns to his village after marrying for third time. His new wife Aamina is young and beautiful. His other two wives Fathima and Maimuna are really unhappy to see this, but they have no other choice other than to accept it. Aamina was in love in with Abdu. Abdu and Usman enters the village and comes to Moidukutty Haji's house to sell bangles.

Abdu sees Aamina and tries various tricks in order to get into Moidukutty Haji's house, but Moidukutty Haji drives them away. When Abdu was in Gulf, Aamina's wicked father secretly stole all letters sent by Abdu by bribing the postman. Aamina's marriage took place without her acceptance. Abdu with some help from his friends makes secret moves to get Aamina back. The events that are going to happen from here makes the plot of the story.

== Cast ==
- Mohanlal as Abdul Khader (Abdu)
- Soundarya as Aamina
- Sreenivasan as Moidutty Haji
- Vindhya as Fathima, Moidutty Haji's first wife
- Geetha Vijayan as Maimuna, Moidutty Haji's second wife
- Sukumari as Beeyathu, Moidhutty Haji's Mother
- Cochin Haneefa as Kalanthan Haji
- Salim Kumar as Usman, Abdu's Friend and Helper
- Jagathy Sreekumar as Irunthalakadan Nampoothiri / Vellattapokkar, a fake spirit
- T. Damodaran as Hajiyar
- Thilakan as Chekkutty, Amina's Father
- Kozhikode Narayanan Nair as Musaliyar
- Baiju as Kunjahammed, Amina's youngest paternal uncle
- Baburaj as Hamsa, Amina's paternal uncle
- K. B. Ganesh Kumar as Ummer, Amina's Brother
- Seema as Subaida, Abdu's Sister
- Abu Salim as Sathar, Amina's maternal Uncle
- V K Sreeraman as Alavikkutty, Amina's eldest paternal Uncle
- Poojappura Ravi as Chappuni Nair
- Santha Devi as Amina's mother
- Manka Mahesh as Chappuni Nair's wife
- Ajayan Adoor as Salim, Moidhootty Haji's right hand
- Vijayan Peringode as Advocate Swami
- Nandu as Rafeeq, the Postman
- Poojappura Radhakrishnan as Balan, Irundalakkadan's Helper
- C V Dev as Azeez

== Release ==
The film was released on 11 April 2003.

=== Box office ===
The movie was a decent runner at the box office.

=== Home media ===
The satellite rights of the film was acquired by Surya TV and later in 2020, it was renewed by Asianet.

== Soundtrack ==
All the music is composed by Vidyasagar and the lyrics are written by B.R Prasad

No.	Title	Artist(s)	Length
1.	"Onnamkilli Ponnankili" (Mohanam)	M. G. Sreekumar, Sujatha Mohan
2.	"Onnanam Kunnin Mele"	M. G. Sreekumar, Sujatha Mohan
3.	"Parayuka Nee Kadha" (Sindhu Bhairavi (raga))	Kailash Kher
4.	"Vilakkukoluthi Varum"	M. G. Sreekumar, Sujatha Mohan
5.	"Kasavinte Thattamittu"	Sujatha Mohan, Vineeth Sreenivasan

== Critical reception ==
Sify gave a positive review, calling it a "sparkling entertainer" and praised the performances of Mohanlal and Sreenivasan. Also adding, technically it is one of the best films in recent times, praising the cinematography, art direction, songs, lyrics, but criticized the plot in the second half.

Chithram wrote that "A fun-filled film with Mohanlal and Sreenivasan trying to recreate their old magic with Jagathy Sreekumar, Salim Kumar, Cochin Haneefa and K. B. Ganesh Kumar".
