= King Faisal =

King Faisal may refer to:

- Faisal of Saudi Arabia (1906–1975)
  - List of things named after Saudi kings#Faisal
- Faisal I of Iraq (1883–1933), king of Greater Syria and king of Iraq
- Faisal II of Iraq (1935–1958) Iraq's last king

== See also ==
- King Faisal Mosque (disambiguation)
- King Faisal Street, in Aleppo Syria
