= Beeyar Prasad =

Indian lyricist and poet (1961–2023)

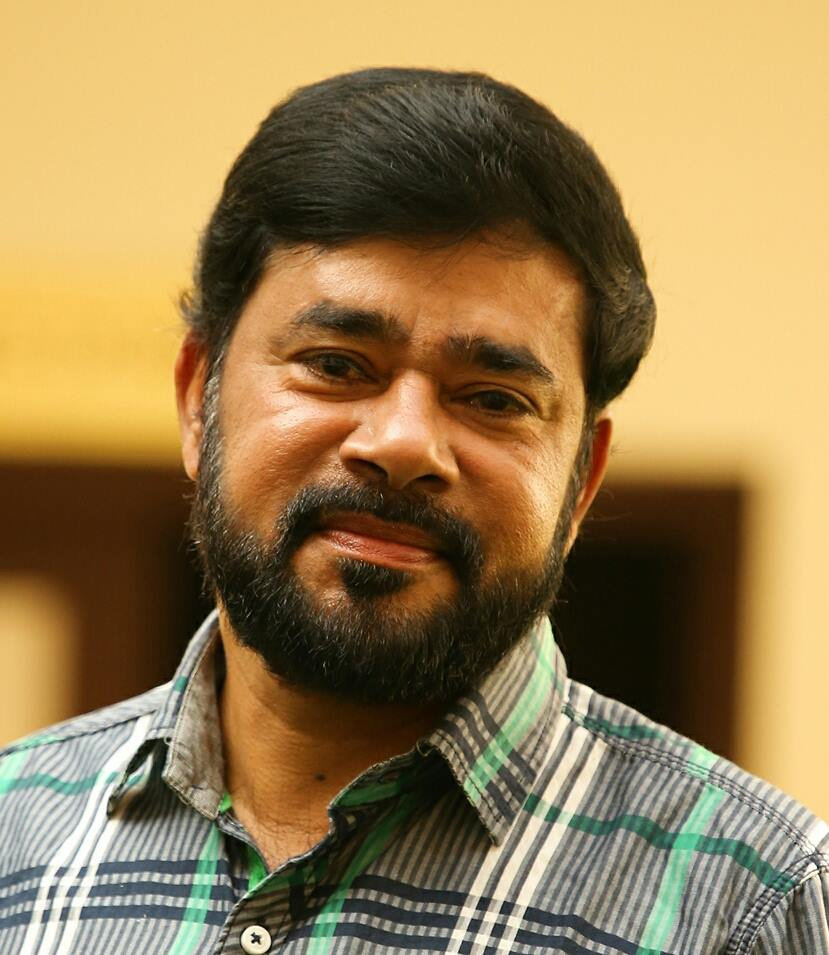
- Born: B. Rajendraprasad; 18 March 1961; Kuttanad, Alappuzha district, Kerala, India
- Died: 4 January 2023 (aged 61); Changanassery, Kerala
- Education: University of Kerala
- Occupations: Lyricist; Screenwriter; Television presenter
- Years active: 2003 – 2023
- Spouse: Vidhu Prasad
- Children: 2

B. Rajendraprasad (18 March 1961 – 4 January 2023), professionally credited as Beeyar Prasad, was an Indian lyricist, poet, and playwright in Malayalam language. He made his cinema debut in the Malayalam film industry through the 2003 film Kilichundan Mampazham composed by Vidyasagar.

== Early life ==
Prasad was born in the village of Monkombu in Kuttanad, Kerala, India. He completed Bachelor of Arts in Malayalam literature. In his younger days, he has written, directed and acted in theatre plays. He has authored over 40 plays, including eight professional dramas. His play Shadkala Govindamarar won award at the Thiruvananthapuram Drama Competition. Prasad has written many librettos for Kathakali.

== Career ==
In 1993, Beeyar scripted the children's film Johny, which won the Kerala State Film Award for Best Children's Film. In 2001, Prasad had played a role, Narayanan in the film Theerthadanam starring Jayaram and Suhasini Maniratnam. He made his debut in the Malayalam cinema music industry through 2003 film Kilichundan Mampazham directed by Priyadarshan and composed by Vidyasagar.

== Personal life ==
He was married to Vidhu Prasad and they have two children. Prasad died from complications from a massive stroke at a private hospital in Changanassery, Kottayam district, on 4 January 2023, at age 61. His dead body was cremated with full state honours at the premises of his home two days later.

== Discography ==
Year	Movie	Song	Composer
2003	Kilichundan Mampazham	Parayuka nee ...	Vidyasagar
2003	Kilichundan Mampazham	Onnaam Kili ...	Vidyasagar
2003	Kilichundan Mampazham	Vilakku Koluthi Varum ...	Vidyasagar
2003	Kilichundan Mampazham	Kasavinte Thattamittu ...	Vidyasagar
2003	Kilichundan Mampazham	Onnaanaam Kunninmele ...	Vidyasagar
2003	Kilichundan Mampazham	Kasthoori Poonkaatte	Vidyasagar
2003	Pattanathil Sundaran	Mullappoovin Motte ...	Mohan Sithara
2003	Ivar	Ore Swaram ...	Srinivas
2004	Njan Salperu Ramankutty	Madana Pathaakayil ...	Raveendran
2004	Njan Salperu Ramankutty	Kaliyaadi Thalir ...	Raveendran
2004	Njan Salperu Ramankutty	They They	Raveendran
2004	Njan Salperu Ramankutty	Mandaarappoo ...	Raveendran
2004	Vettam	Mazhathullikal [M] ...	Berny Ignatius
2004	Vettam	Oru Kaathilola ...	Berny Ignatius
2004	Vettam	Illathe Kalyanathinu (F) ...	Berny Ignatius
2004	Vettam	Mazhathullikal (F) ...	Berny Ignatius
2004	Vettam	Illathe Kalyanathinu [D] ...	Berny Ignatius
2004	Jalolsavam	Keranirakalaadum ...	Alphonse Joseph
2004	Jalolsavam	Thaarakappodi ...	Alphonse Joseph
2004	Jalolsavam	Kulirillam Vaazhum [D] ...	Alphonse Joseph
2004	Vamanapuram Bus Route	Yezhai Paravakale ...	Sonu Sisupal
2005	Iruvattam Manavaatti	Veenayaakumo ...	Alphonse Joseph
2005	Iruvattam Manavaatti	Ponnum Jamanthippoovum ...	Alphonse Joseph
2005	Iruvattam Manavaatti	Vidarum Varna Pookkal ...	Alphonse Joseph
2005	Iruvattam Manavaatti	Gaanamanu Njan ...	Alphonse Joseph
2005	Iruvattam Manavaatti	Kanneeril Pidayum ...	Alphonse Joseph
2005	Twinkle Twinkle Little Star	Magic Journey ...	Ilayaraja
2005	Twinkle Twinkle Little Star	Magic Journey ...	Ilayaraja
2005	The Campus	Paalnilaavamma ...	M. Jayachandran
2005	The Campus	The Campus ...	M. Jayachandran
2005	Sarkar Dada	Ruthu ruthu ...	M. Jayachandran
2005	Sarkar Dada	Naadodippaattinte ...	M. Jayachandran
2005	Sarkar Dada	Mandaarappoo Choriyum ...	M. Jayachandran
2005	Sarkar Dada	Kallu Pattu ...	M. Jayachandran
2005	Sarkar Dada	Tic Tic ...	M. Jayachandran
2005	Sarkar Dada	Thulaaminnal ...	M. Jayachandran
2005	Sarkar Dada	Tic Tic [F] ...	M. Jayachandran
2005	Banglaavil Outha	Chandira Chandira ...	M. Jayachandran
2005	Hai	Oru Veedu ...	BJ Prakash
2005	Hai	Ninavukalaal ...	BJ Prakash
2005	Hai	Iniyum Veene Paadiyaalum ...	BJ Prakash
2005	Hai	Breeze Ulakkum Shippinullil Ponathaaro ...	BJ Prakash
2005	Hai	Vallee Vallee ...	BJ Prakash
2005	Hai	Koo Koo Koo Koo ...	BJ Prakash
2005	Hai	Oru Poovaniyile ...	BJ Prakash
2005	Hai	Poovam Kurunnukale ...	BJ Prakash
2005	Oraal	Iniyente Maathram ...	Viswajith
2006	Lanka	Innoru Naal ...	Srinivas
2006	Lanka	Kadalezhum ...	Rajesh Mohan
2006	Lanka	Ilaya Manmadha (D) ...	Srinivas
2006	Lanka	Kadalezhum ...	Srinivas
2006	Jayam	Kanneeril Punyaaham [F] ...	Sonu Sisupal
2006	Jayam	Mizhiyiloru Theeyaay [F] ...	Sonu Sisupal
2006	Jayam	Mizhiyiloru Theeyaay [M] ...	Sonu Sisupal
2006	Jayam	Painkili Paadana [F] ...	Sonu Sisupal
2006	Jayam	Theliveyilum ...	Sonu Sisupal
2006	Jayam	Thulumbidum Then ...	Sonu Sisupal
2006	Jayam	Poovaanennu ...	Sonu Sisupal
2008	Swarnnam	Kanivodum ...	Mohan Sithara
2009	Seethaa Kalyaanam	Doore doore vaanil nee ...	Srinivas
2009	Seethaa Kalyaanam	Chandramada ...	Srinivas
2009	Seethaa Kalyaanam	Ragasudha Rasamay ...	Srinivas
2009	Seethaa Kalyaanam	Seethaakalyaana Vaibhogame ...	Srinivas
2009	Seethaa Kalyaanam	Seetharamam kadhasusaaram ...	Srinivas
2009	Seethaa Kalyaanam	Ketteele visesham ...	Srinivas
2009	Seethaa Kalyaanam	Doore Doore Vaanil Njaan [F] ...	Srinivas
2012	Kunjaliyan	Aadaadum ...	MG Sreekumar
2012	Thalsamayam Oru Penkutti	O Thinkal Pakshi ...	Sharreth
2012	Friday 11.11.11 Alappuzha	Aaraaro Aaromale ...	Roby Abraham
2012	Friday 11.11.11 Alappuzha	Olathil Chaanchaadi ...	Roby Abraham
2012	Friday 11.11.11 Alappuzha	Nilaavaay Pookkum ...	Roby Abraham
2012	Friday 11.11.11 Alappuzha	Sugandha Neeralayaay ...	Roby Abraham
2013	Kallante Makan	Naruvennayil ...	Aji Sharas
2013	Kallante Makan	Poo Poraanjo ...	Aji Sharas
2013	Kallante Makan	Sree Vinaayaka ...	Aji Sharas
2014	Call Me @	Aaraarum Kaanaathe ...	Afsal Yusuf, Thej Mervin
2014	Call Me @	Oreyoru Naalil ...	Afsal Yusuf, Thej Mervin
2014	Call Me @	Puthanoru Mettil ...	Afsal Yusuf, Thej Mervin
2014	Monaayi Angane Aanaayi	Taj Theerthoru ...	Vinu Uday
2014	Monaayi Angane Aanaayi	Thaane Vidarum ...	Vinu Uday
2014	Shesham Kadhaabhaagam	Nerilaaloru Neythiri ...	Vidhu Alleppey
2014	Shesham Kadhaabhaagam	Kaalam ...	Vidhu Alleppey
2014	Shesham Kadhaabhaagam	Nerilaaloru Neythiri ...	Vidhu Alleppey
2018	Moonnara	Thorathe Nenchil ...	Sreerag Denni
2018	Thattumpurath Achuthan	Muthumani Raadhe ...	Deepankuran
2022	Tha Thavalayude Tha	Mizhiyilaaranu	Nikhil Rajan
2023	Tha Thavalayude Tha	Akrom Pekrom	Nikhil Rajan
2023	Tha Thavalayude Tha	Karayumennano	Nikhil Rajan
2023	Tha Thavalayude Tha	Mindaanilla	Nikhil Rajan
2023	Tha Thavalayude Tha	Moolipaadum	Nikhil Rajan
