= Caritas Vorarlberg =

Catholic charity organisation in Austria

- Headquarters: Feldkirch, Austria
- Fields: social work, humanitarian aid
- Director: Walter Schmolly
- Budget: 54,874,000 EUR (2017)
- Website: caritas-vorarlberg.at

The Caritas Vorarlberg, also Caritas of the Diocese of Feldkirch (German: Caritas der Diözese Feldkirch), is a social aid organization of the Roman Catholic Church in the Austrian federal state of Vorarlberg. It is part of Caritas Austria, but an independent institution and reports to the bishop of the Diocese of Feldkirch.

== Organisation ==
Walter Schmolly is the Director of the Caritas of the Feldkirch Diocese. The organisation is divided into eight departments:

- Parish charity and social-spatial acting
- People with disabilities
- Social counselling/accompaniment
- Refugee aid
- Work & qualification
- Addiction help
- Foreign aid
- Hospice Vorarlberg

== Assignments ==
The core mission of Caritas in Vorarlberg is to help people in emergency situations and to enable people to help others. It offers support in the form of counselling, immediate help and services for/at

- Families in acute emergency situations: Caritas offers help with childcare, housekeeping, care and nursing of sick or elderly family members, offers educational and nursing support for people with physical, mental and/or multiple disabilities.
- Homelessness: Counselling and support in the event of impending or acute housing loss, emergency sleeping places.
- Refugees: Asylum seekers receive not only accommodation in a refugee house, but also social counselling and support from Caritas refugee aid in the diocese of Feldkirch.
- Addiction or eating disorders: Counselling and support are offered in the addiction centres at Feldkirch, Bludenz, Bregenz, Bregenzerwald, Dornbirn and Kleinwalsertal for eating disorders provide information and help for those affected.
- Serious illnesses and grief: The Vorarlberg Hospice advises, accompanies and cares for those affected and their relatives in the event of serious illness and grief. People with severe, incurable diseases are cared for in the "Hospiz am See" or by a mobile palliative team.
- Qualification for long-term unemployed people and integration into the labour market: "Carla Soziale Unternehmen" offers people looking for a job a temporary job and support for reintegration into the labour market, "Startbahn" is aimed at unemployed young people and "start2work" at refugees entitled to stay.
- People with disabilities on the way to inclusion: The Caritas of the Diocese of Feldkirch supports people with disabilities on their way to being able to take their life into their own hands - at home, at work and in their leisure time.
- Supporting fellow human beings abroad in the creation of important livelihoods (hunger, education, health): Helping people to help themselves is possible in the priority countries of Caritas Vorarlberg Armenia, Ethiopia, Ecuador and Mozambique.
- In catastrophic situations (floods, refugee drama, hunger, etc.) Caritas of the Feldkirch diocese cooperates with Caritas Austria and the international Caritas network of Caritas Internationalis.

== Financing ==
The income of EUR 54,874,082 mainly consists of fees for services (72.2%), donations amount to 10.5%. Of the expenses, 3.5% are for administration and less than 1% for fundraising (as of 2017).

According to the Federal Ministry of Finance, donations to the Caritas of the Feldkirch diocese are tax-deductible as special expenses.
