= Faisal Maodah =

Saudi Arabian footballer

Personal information
- Full name: Faisal Mansour Maodah
- Date of birth: November 10, 1990 (age 36)
- Place of birth: Saudi Arabia
- Height: 1.76 m (5 ft 9 1/2 in)
- Position: Left-back

Senior career*
Years	Team	Apps	(Gls)
2008–2010	Al-Ahli	7	(0)
2010–2012	Al-Ettifaq	0	(0)
2012–2015	Najran	12	(0)
2015–2016	Al-Fayha		
2016	Al-Riyadh		
2017	Al-Nojoom		
2017–2018	Abha		
2018–2019	Al-Hejaz		
- * Club domestic league appearances and goals

Faisal Maodah (born 10 November 1990) is a Saudi football player. He currently plays as a left-back.
