= Faycal Laridhi =

Tunisian volleyball player (born 1962)

Personal information
- Nationality: Tunisian
- Born: 3 May 1962 (age 62)

Sport
- Sport: Volleyball

Faycal Laridhi (born 3 May 1962) is a Tunisian volleyball player. He competed in the men's tournament at the 1984 Summer Olympics.
