= Fayçal Bentaleb =

Algerian politician

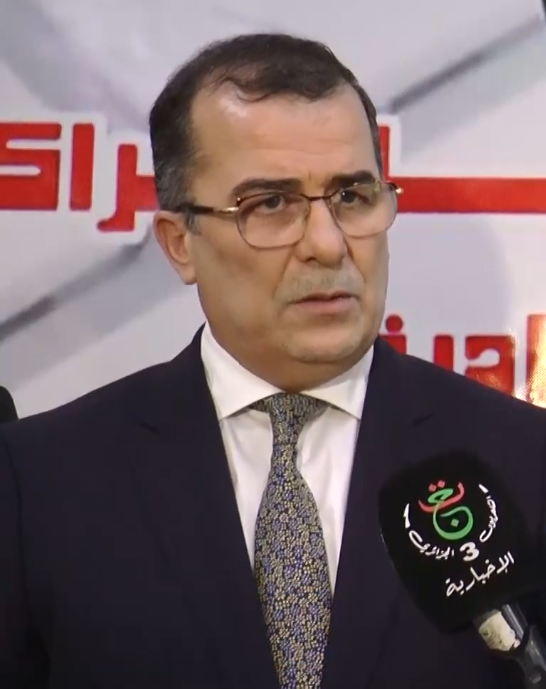
- Bentaleb in 2024

Minister of Labor, Employment and Social Security
- Incumbent
- Assumed office 16 March 2023
- President: Abdelmadjid Tebboune
- Prime Minister: Aymen Benabderrahmane; Nadir Larbaoui

Personal details
- Born: July 16, 1973 (age 53) Constantine, Algeria
- Education: Algiers 1 University (LL.B.)
- Profession: Politician

Fayçal Bentaleb (born 16 July 1973, in Constantine, Algeria) is the Algerian Minister of Labor, Employment, and Social Security. He was appointed as minister on 16 March 2023.

== Education ==
Bentaleb holds a Bachelor of Laws (2001) from the Algiers 1 University.
