= Faisal al-Hegelan =

Saudi diplomat (1929–2019)

Faisal Al-Hegelan
- فيصل بن عبد العزيز عبد الرحمن الحجيلان
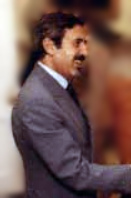

Personal details
- Born: 1929 Jeddah, Saudi Arabia
- Died: 2019 (aged 90) Beirut, Lebanon
- Education: Cairo University (LL.B.)
- Occupation: Diplomat, Politician
- Awards: Order of Isabella the Catholic; Order of May; Knight Commander of the Order of the British Empire; Order of Rio Branco

Faisal Al-Hegelan (Arabic: فيصل بن عبد العزيز عبد الرحمن الحجيلان; 1929–2019) was a Saudi Arabian diplomat. During his career, he served as Saudi ambassador to Spain, Venezuela, Argentina, the United Kingdom, Denmark, the United States, and France. He was also Saudi Arabia's longest-serving minister of health, serving until 1995.

Al-Hegelan returned to the Ministry of Foreign Affairs in 1996, assuming the role of Ambassador to France. His exemplary service during these years earned him international recognition and several prestigious awards, such as the Order of Isabella the Catholic from Spain, the Order of May from Argentina, the Knight Commander of the Order of the British Empire, and the Order of Rio Branco from Brazil.

== Early life and education ==
Al-Hegelan was born in Jeddah in 1929. He pursued his higher education at the University of Cairo, where he earned a law degree in 1951, then known as King Fuad I University. This educational foundation paved the way for his future career in diplomacy and public service.

== Death ==
Al-Hegelan died in Beirut, Lebanon in 2019 at the age of 90.
