= Caritas Austria =

Social aid organisation of the Roman Catholic Church

- Caritas Österreich
- Abbreviation: CÖ
- Established: 1903; 123 years ago
- Type: Association
- Coordinates: 48.18512°N 16.33289°E
- Origins: Catholic Social Teaching
- Region served: Austria and worldwide
- Fields: social work, social policy, humanitarian aid
- President: Nora Tödtling-Musenbichler
- Affiliations: Caritas Europa, Caritas Internationalis
- Revenue: € 1,128,300,000 (2022)
- Expenses: € 1,128,300,000 (2022)
- Staff: 17,694 (2024)
- Volunteers: around 46,000 (2024)
- Website: www.caritas.at

Caritas Austria (German: Caritas Österreich) is an Austrian social aid organisation of the Roman Catholic Church, founded in 1903. It consists of a national office and nine regional diocesan Caritas organisations, all of which are legally independent.

Caritas Austria is a member of both Caritas Internationalis and its subregion Caritas Europa.

== History ==
The Caritas movement in Austria can be traced back to the first Caritas Congresses shortly after the turn of the 19th and 20th centuries. The organisational structure at that time was based on the model of Caritas Germany, founded in 1897. Shortly after the World War I, nine regional associations were established. The first focal points of activity were, according to the emergency, meals and children's recreation activities in the country. The Caritas funeral care took care of a Christian funeral for people from poorer social classes.

Later - analogous to the Federal Republic of Germany - fields of activity such as nursing services, care and family assistance were added, homeless, disabled and refugee assistance (for example during the Hungarian popular uprising of 1956), social counselling, the Caritas shops, mother-child houses and finally (mobile) hospice work and employment projects.

In 2015, the Austrian Caritas supported more than 72,000 people with advice and also financially in its 36 social counselling centres and disbursed around four million Euros in emergency aid. Caritas Family helpers look after children and the household when the parents are no longer able to do so.

Caritas activities abroad mainly are disaster relief and development cooperation.

== Structure ==
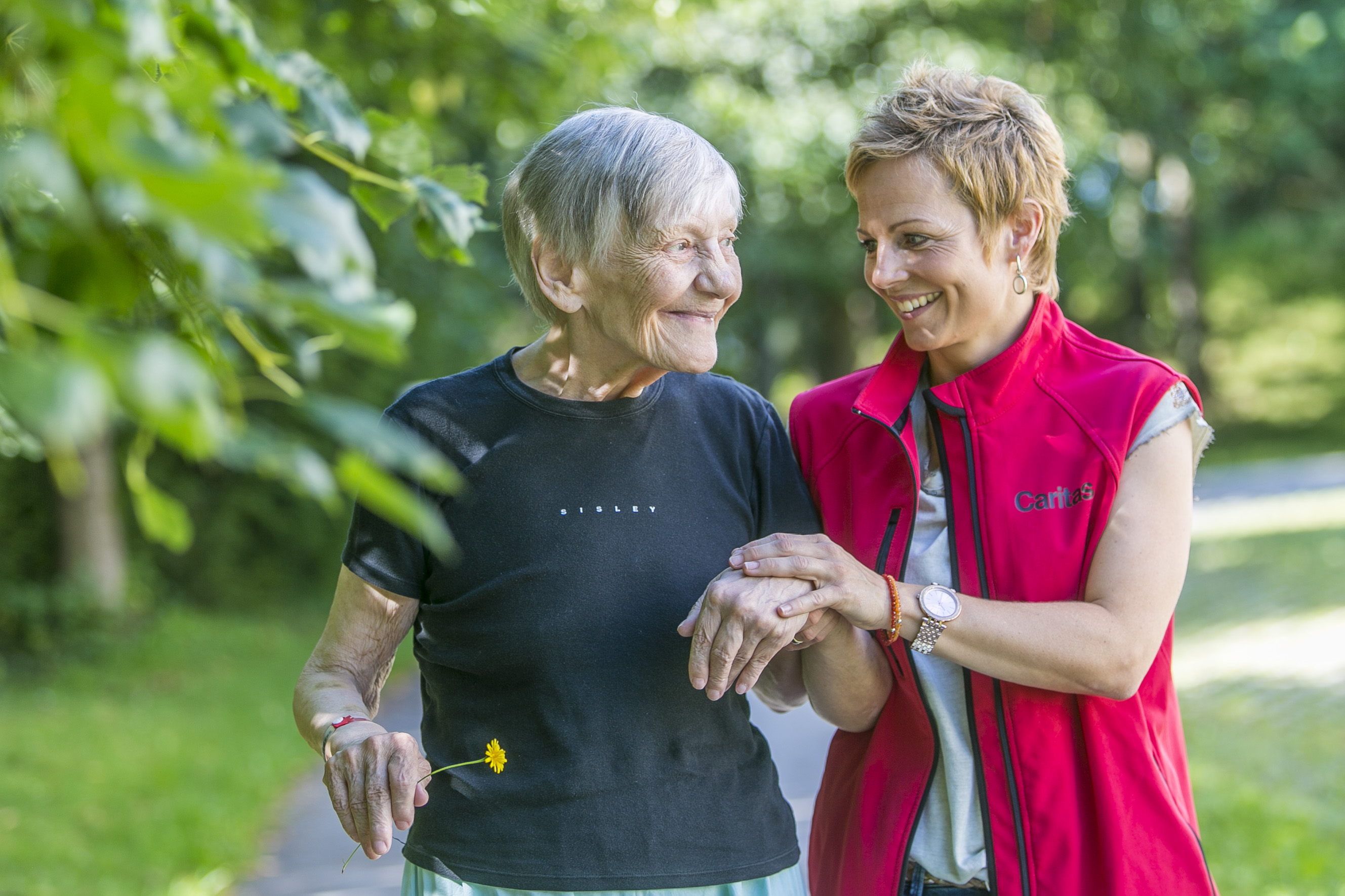
Caritas worker with a patient of the geriatric ward of Salzburg University Hospital.

The Austrian Caritas consists of the nine independent organisations with their own financial responsibility in the Austrian dioceses. The central coordination currently consists of Nora Tödtling-Musenbichler as president and the Secretary General Anna Parr and her deputy Andreas Knapp (Secretary General for International Programmes). Each individual Caritas Institution is a separate legal body and acts as a supporting organisation for social services. Most of them are registered as associations under Church law.

Organisations in the Dioceses:

- Caritas der Diözese Feldkirch (Caritas Vorarlberg)
- Caritas der Erzdiözese Wien
- Caritas St. Pölten
- Caritas Burgenland
- Caritas der Diözese Graz-Seckau
- Caritas Oberösterreich
- Kärntner Caritasverband
- Caritas der Diözese Innsbruck
- Caritas Salzburg

Each parish has its own parish charity: a total of 33,000 parish charity employees work for "active charity". They organise visiting services, senior meetings, benefit events, discussion groups, flea markets, Caritas showcases, holiday programmes for children, individual financial help, refugee aid, house collections and much more.

== Staff members and volunteers ==
In 2024, Caritas Austria had more than 17,000 employees and around 46,000 volunteers.

6,046 employees worked in the field of care and nursing.

Of the more than 40,000 Caritas volunteers all over the country, more than 3,000 teenagers were involved with youngCaritas.

== Work ==
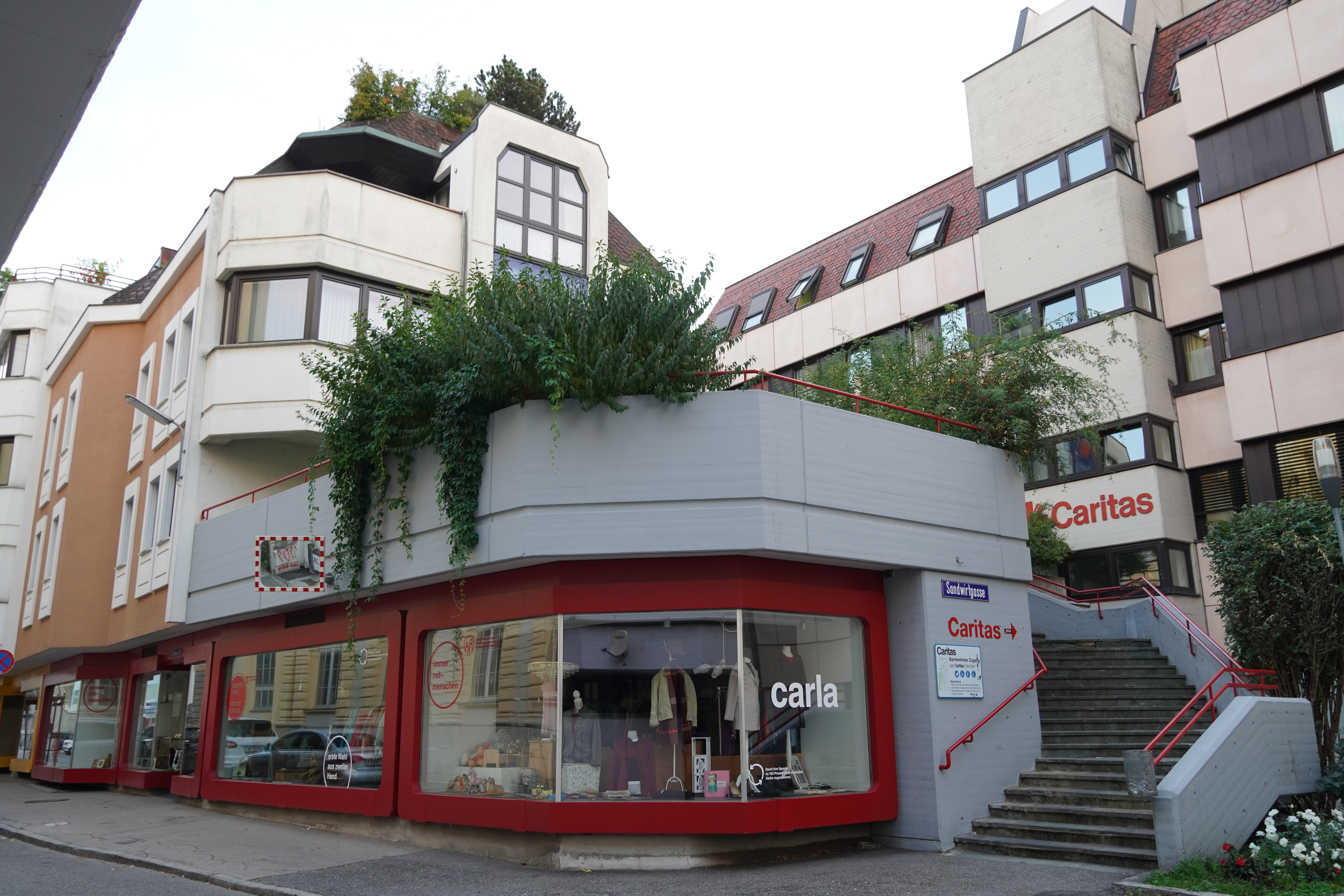
Secondhand clothing shop by Caritas in Klagenfurt.

Caritas Austria ran 71 shelters for homeless persons in 2024 with a total of 2,080 beds and 53 retirement and care homes, as well as 12 mother and child centres with accommodation for 203 mothers and their children and 71 Caritas social counselling centres offering advice and help to people in need.

Another focus area is the work with people with disabilities. In 2024, Caritas offered more than 12,000 care places and almost 3,000 workshop places for people with disabilities. In addition, more than 7,000 people with disabilities received psychosocial support, and 1,800 benefitted from assisted living facilities.

In 2022, Caritas Austria supported 508 foreign aid projects worldwide with a total volume amounting to 67.4 million euro.

== Financing ==
Over the past decades, Caritas has transformed itself from a donor company to a service company in the vicinity of the public sector. Meanwhile (2017) only about 8% of the expenses are covered by donations (including church contributions), in 2015 it was still about 10%. The predominant part (62%) is accounted for by fees for services from public funds, the rest largely by private fees and (state) subsidies.

Due to the strong dependence on (state) service fees, the self-definition as an aid organisation is partly doubted and Caritas is described as "a company with an annual turnover of over 900 million euros". This criticism was rejected by Caritas President Landau with reference to the general interest in the work of Caritas.

In 2017, donations rose to 77.58 million euros. This makes Caritas the non-profit organisation with the highest donations in Austria.

Caritas' turnover is exempt from turnover tax.

== President ==
List of Caritas presidents post World War II:

- Jakob Weinbacher (1947–1952)
- Hermann Pfeiffer (1952–1964)
- Leopold Ungar (1964- 1991)
- Helmut Schüller (1991–1995)
- Franz Küberl (1995–2013)
- Michael Landau (2013–2023)
- Nora Tödtling-Musenbichler (2023-currently)
