= Faisal Shaikh =

Indian cricketer (born 1977)

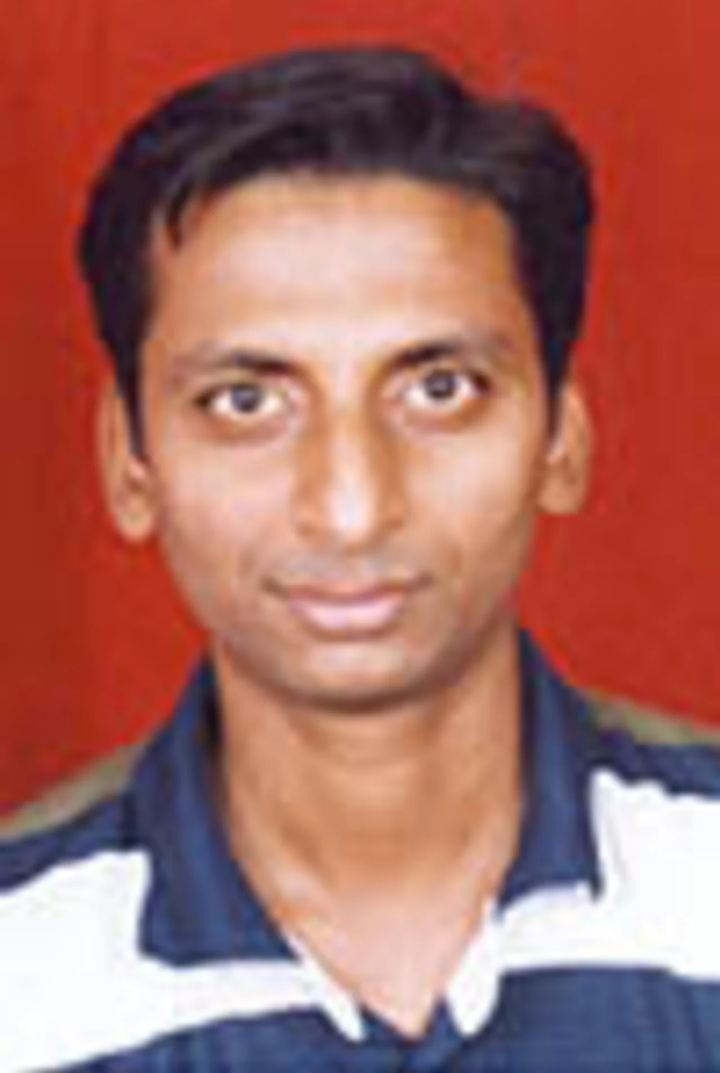
- Faisal Shaikh

Personal information
- Full name: Faisal Moosa Mamlekar Shaikh
- Born: 2 December 1977 (age 48); Bombay, Maharashtra, India
- Batting: Right-handed
- Bowling: Right-arm offbreak
- Role: Bowler

Domestic team information
- Years: Team
- 1998: Mumbai
- 2002–2006: Goa

Career statistics
Competition	First-class	List A
Matches	17	2
Runs scored	171	1
Batting average	11.40	–
100s/50s	0/0	0/0
Top score	30	1*
Balls bowled	4,045	42
Wickets	51	0
Bowling average	34.25	–
5 wickets in innings	3	–
10 wickets in match	1	–
Best bowling	9/29	–
Catches/stumpings	2/–	0/–
- Source: ESPNcricinfo, 25 October 2016

Faisal Moosa Mamlekar Shaikh (born 2 December 1977) is a first-class cricketer who played for Goa and Mumbai in the Ranji Trophy. He was born in Bombay, Maharashtra, India. Faisal is known for his right-arm offbreak bowling, and bats right-handed.

Faisal began his domestic career for Mumbai, playing two first-class matches during the 1997–98 Ranji Trophy. He returned to the national level in 2002, representing Goa. In December 2002, he took 9/29 in the 2002–03 Ranji Trophy playing for Goa against Services which was the fourth best bowling figures in Ranji Trophy history; as of July 2020, it is the fifth best. It was one of three five-wicket hauls that Skaikh took in the 2002–03 Ranji Trophy.

== Teams ==
Ranji Trophy: Goa, Mumbai
