= Faisal Khartash =

Syrian writer and novelist

Faisal Khurtush
- Born: 1952 (69 years), Aleppo

Faisal Khartash (Arabic:فيصل خرتش) is a Syrian writer and novelist who was born and raised in Aleppo in 1952. He studied in Al Katateeb; then went to elementary school in old Aleppo. He got a high degree in Arabic Language from University of Aleppo then got a diploma in Eastern languages in 1983.

== Career ==
Faisal Khartash emerged as a member of the Arab Writers Union as well as a member of the Union of Arab Journalists, where he began publishing his first articles in 1975 and has been a correspondent for the Al-esboa Al-adabi newspaper since its first issue and for more than five years. He was appointed literary correspondent for the London-based Newspaper Al-Sharq al-Awsat and continues to write there today; he also writes regularly in Al-Hayat (London), Al Bayan (Dubai) and Al-Thawra (Damascus).

He began writing in 1973 and emerged as a story writer on the university's pulpits and published his first stories in 1975 in Syrian newspapers. His first collection, News, was published in 1986 by the Ministry of Culture; and another, the Women's Tree, from the Ministry of Culture in 2001.

He won several awards in the short story, including the first prize in the Arab Writers Union, as well as the first prize in the short story of al-Baath newspaper on the 40th anniversary and the magazine Al-Vanguard, the Medhat Akash Award, the Labtani Short Story Award and the Cairo Literary News Award for the short story.

His novel The Summary of the Pasha's History, which was printed in London in 1990, won the Riad al-Rais Prize for Arabic Fiction, and his novel the Dust of Strangers received the Naguib Mahfouz Prize for Arabic Fiction in 1995 and was transformed into a film directed by Samir Dhikra; the film won the first prize at the Cairo International Film Festival in 1998.

== His works ==
- The News (original title: Al Akhbar)
- The Women's Tree (original title: Shagaret Al Nesaa’)
- The Summary of the Pasha's History (original title: Mojaz Tareekh Al Basha)
- The Dust of Strangers (original title: Turab Al Ghourabaa’)
- The Leaves of Night and Jasmine (original title: Awraq Al Lail Wa Al Yasmeen)
- Olive Khan (original title: Khan Al Zaytoon)
- The Lunatics Café (original title: Maqha Al Majaneen)
- The Women's Bath (original title: Hamam Al Neswan)
- Experience in Fantasy A Novel (original title: Tajroba Fi Al fantazia Al Riwaya)
- The Castle's Café (original title: Maqha Al Qasr)
- Juggernaut (original title: Al Taghoot)
- Afternoon's Sun (original title: Shams Al Aseel)
- Gin Alley (original title: Ziqaq Al Jin)
- The Stone's Eye (original title: Ayn Al Hajar)
