= Fayçal Nini =

French footballer (born 1986)

Personal information
- Full name: Fayçal Nini
- Date of birth: 10 August 1986 (age 40)
- Place of birth: Armentières, France
- Height: 1.72 m (5 ft 7 1/2 in)
- Position: Midfielder

Senior career*
Years	Team	Apps	(Gls)
2006–2009	Lille OSC (B)	78	(12)
2009–2010	Nea Salamina	0	(0)
- * Club domestic league appearances and goals as of 26 October 2009

Fayçal Nini (born 10 August 1986) is a French football player of Algerian descent who last played for Nea Salamina. He started his career for the reserves of Lille OSC.
