= Faisal Buressli =

Kuwaiti basketball player and coach

Faisal Buressli (Arabic: فيصل بورسلي) - (born November 6, 1961, in Manama, Bahrain) is a Kuwaiti former basketball player and current coach.
