= Fazal Dad Khan =

Pakistani politician

Fazal Dad Khan Dagai (1929–1999) was a Pakistani politician born in Dagai. He was the son of Haji Rehmat Khan Dagai, the elders of Khans of Dagai and an activist of the Pakistan freedom movement. Fazal Dad Khan Dagai completed his early education from Swabi and did his intermediate from Islamia college Peshawer, and graduated from Gordon College Rawalpindi. He was elected member of the district council in 1983, and was elected member of the National Assembly from NA 8 Swabi Khyber-Pakhtunkhwa, Pakistan in 1985. He was the member the Central Executive Committee of Pakistan Muslim League. He died in 1999.
