= Faisal Yousef =

Emirati association football player (born 1996)

Faisal Yousef فيصل يوسف
Personal information
- Full name: Faisal Yousef Saqer Murad
- Date of birth: 7 January 1996 (age 30)
- Place of birth: Emirates
- Height: 1.65 m (5 ft 5 in)
- Position: Right back

Youth career
- Al-Ahli

Senior career*
| Years | Team | Apps | (Gls) |
| 2017 | Shabab Al-Ahli | 0 | (0) |
| 2017–2018 | Al-Dhafra | 3 | (0) |
| 2018–2019 | Al-Fujairah | 6 | (0) |
| 2020 | Dibba Al-Hisn | 0 | (0) |
- * Club domestic league appearances and goals

Faisal Yousef (Arabic:فيصل يوسف) (born 7 January 1996) is an Emirati footballer. He currently plays as a right back.

== Career ==
=== Al-Ahli ===
Faisal Yousef started his career at Al-Ahli and is a product of the Al-Ali's youth system.

=== Shabab Al-Ahli ===
He was playing with Al-Ahli and after merging Al Ahli, Al-Shabab and Dubai clubs under the name Shabab Al-Ahli Club he was joined to Shabab Al-Ali.

=== Al Dhafra ===
On 24 December 2017, he left Shabab Al-Ali and signed with Al-Dhafra . On 8 February 2018, Faisal Yousef made his professional debut for Al-Dhafra against Dibba Al-Fujairah in the Pro League.

=== Al-Fujairah ===
On 2 October 2018, he left Al-Dhafra and signed with Al-Fujairah. On 23 February 2019, Faisal Yousef made his professional debut for Al-Fujairah against Ajman in the Pro League.
