= Fazal Shah =

Syed Fazal Ali Shah Jilani is a member of the National Assembly of Pakistan from Khairpur District, Sindh. He is affiliated with the Pakistan Peoples Party. He has also been elected on Provincial Assembly of Sindh.

He is the son of Abdul Qadir Shah Jilani. He is a graduate of Shah Abdul Latif University Khairpur.
