= Faysal Soysal =

Turkish poet and film director (born 1979)

Faysal Soysal (born 24 October 1979) is a Turkish poet and film director.

Soysal was born in Batman in 1979. He left medical school to focus on poetry and cinema in 2000. Between 2003 and 2007, he finished his MA on Film Directing at Tehran Art University, Iran and at the same time, did New Turkish Literature at Van Yuzuncuyil University, Turkey. He did 4 short films in Iran, which were awarded at international film festivals. With Dreams of Lost Time (35mm), he has come closer to finding his own cinematographic language.

In 2008, he attended the New York Film Academy with the help of a scholarship and directed 4 short films. He was selected for Talent Campus at Sarajevo Film Festival in 2009. He did his first feature film Crossroads in 2013 (filmed in Turkey and Bosnia), and it received 13 awards from film festivals. He did documentary series for Al Jazire and TRT TV. He used to be a volunteer of Doctors Worldwide and produced Africa documentaries about their aid. They have been screened on TRT Documentary Channel in the name Worldwide Stories as 11 episodes. He has published books on poetry and cinema.

He is the director of International Amity Short Film Festival since two years ago. In 2020, he finished his second feature film, Silenced Tree, as a first co-production of Turkish-Iranian .
