= Faisal Zaman Khan =

Justice of the Lahore High Court
- Incumbent
- Assumed office 22 March 2014

Personal details
- Born: 31 July 1967 (age 59)

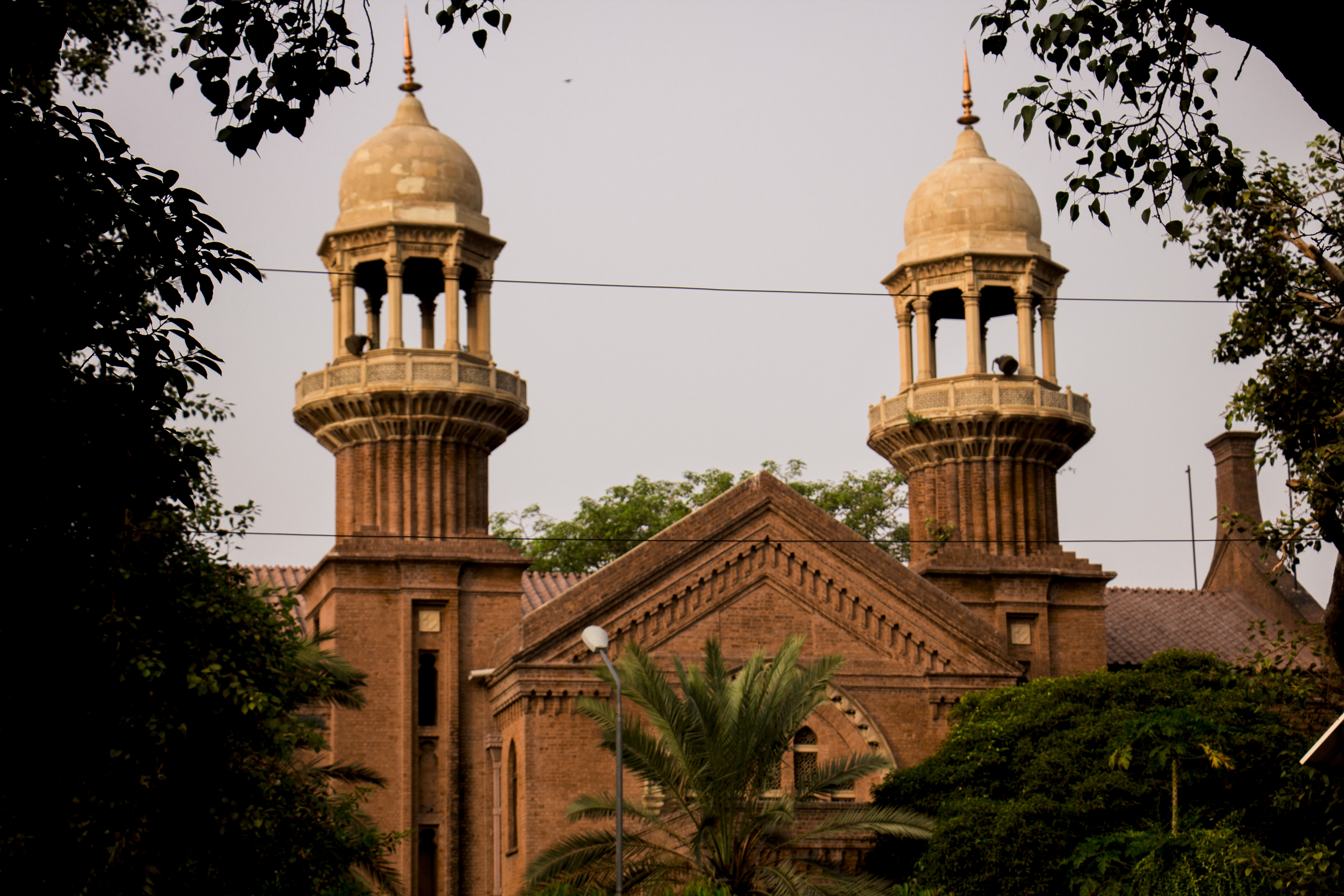
Lahore High Court

Faisal Zaman Khan (born 31 July 1967) is a Pakistani jurist and a Justice of the Lahore High Court since 22 March 2014.
