= Faisal H. M. Al-Sabah =

Kuwaiti diplomat (born 1963)

Faisal Al-Humoud Al-Malek Al-Sabah

Advisor to the Prince of Kuwait (holding the rank of minister)
- In office April 6, 2021 – Present

Personal details
- Born: 11 December 1963 (age 62) Kuwait City, Kuwait

Faisal Hmoud Al Malek Al-Sabah (born 11 December 1963) is a member of Kuwait's ruling family, a high diplomat, and was appointed the governor of Al Farwaniyah Governorate holding the rank of minister. Al-Sabah earned his bachelor's and master's degrees in Political Science and Economics. Al-Sabah then started his political career as the Director of Protocol at the Al-Diwan Al-Amiri of His Highness the Crown Prince and Prime Minister from 1986 to 2003. From then on Al-Sabah assumed a position as the undersecretary at the Al-Diwan Al-Amiri of the Prime Minister. That year Al-Sabah was appointed as the Kuwaiti ambassador to the Sultanate of Oman, and the non-resident Ambassador to Mauritius. In 2007 Al-Sabah was appointed as the Kuwaiti Ambassador to Jordan, and the non-resident Ambassador to Palestine and Iraq.

== Positions ==
- Head of the committee that planned Kuwait's forty anniversary for the countries independence, and tenth year of liberation.
- General Coordinator of the headquarters of the Kuwaiti government during its presence at its headquarters in Taif, Saudi Arabia, in the 1990 Gulf War.
- Assistant Chairman and Director General for the committee of ceremonies of many of the Arab and Islamic summits.
- Board member of Warbah insurance company.
- Director of Protocol at the Diwan of the Crown Prince and Prime Minister. 1986
- Under-secretary of the Diwan of the Prime Minister (Bayan Palace) 2003.
- Ambassador of the State of Kuwait to the Sultanate of Oman and the non-resident Ambassador to the Republic Mauritius 2004 − 2007
- Ambassador of the State of Kuwait to the Hashemite Kingdom of Jordan, and the non-resident Ambassador to Palestine and Iraq
