= King Abdul Aziz Foundation for Human Sciences and Islamic Studies =

Study center in Morocco

- مؤسسة الملك عبد العزيز آل سعود للدراسات الإسلامية والعلوم الإنسانية
- 33.59661827679142°N 7.663551291458584°W
- Location: Casablanca, Morocco
- Established: 1985

Other information
- Website: www.fondation.org.ma/web/accueil

The King Abdul Aziz Foundation for Human Sciences and Islamic Studies in Casablanca (Arabic: مؤسسة الملك عبد العزيز آل سعود للدراسات الإسلامية والعلوم الإنسانية, romanized: Muʼassasat al-Malik ʻAbd al-ʻAzīz Āl Saʻūd lil-Dirāsāt al-Islāmīyah wa-al-ʻUlūm al-Insānīyah) is a research library in Casablanca, Morocco for social and human sciences as well as Arab-Islamic studies. The foundation was established by Abdullah bin Abdulaziz Al Saud in 1985.

The complex includes a library, a media center, and a mosque, and it is located near the Atlantic coast on Ain Diab. The complex covers an area of approximately 15,000 m^{2}, and the library holds about a million titles in the fields of literature and the sciences, in a variety of languages in addition to lithographs, rare books, photographs, postage stamps, and academic papers. The foundation is a public use institution and publishes books and hosts conferences.
