= King Abdulaziz Public Library =

Library in Riyadh, Saudi Arabia

King Abdulaziz Public Library مكتبة الملك عبد العزيز العامة
- Location: King Faisal Road, King Abdulaziz Historical Center, al-Murabba, Riyadh, Saudi Arabia
- Established: 15 December 1999; 26 years ago

Other information
- Website: www.kapl.org.sa

King Abdulaziz Public Library (KAPL) (Arabic: مكتبة الملك عبد العزيز العامة) is a public library in Riyadh, Saudi Arabia. Established in 1985 by Crown Prince Abdullah bin Abdulaziz, it was inaugurated in February 1988 and assumed its current name in 1996.

== History and profile ==
The library was founded in 1985 by Crown Prince Abdullah bin Abdulaziz. The building was designed and constructed by Saudi Oger. The building cost $40,000,000.00 to construct and spans an area of 26,000 m². "The architectural character presents a unique formal statement, and it employs local themes and materials reinterpreted using modern technology."

Special collections include the private library of the American Orientalist George Rentz, the library of Hamza Bu Bakr (made up of 17,170 titles in 19,281 volumes) and a collection of over 7,000 rare Arab and Islamic coins.

The KAPL has 5,271 rare Arabic titles cataloged, classified and entered into the Arabic books database, as well as 3,000 rare Arabic books currently being cataloged.

The KAPL also has one of the rarest collections of photographs in the world. This collection shares a total of 5,564 single original photographs taken by the most famous photographers of the East and the Arab world since the beginning of photography in 1740. The photos in the collection have also been taken by travelers, sea captains, military personnel and more.

== Library objectives ==
King Abdulaziz Library aims to achieve the following objectives:

- Provide and organize all forms of intellectual output, including books, periodicals, audio-visual materials, and manuscripts in various fields of knowledge.
- Focus on collecting, documenting, and preserving Arab and foreign intellectual output in all its forms, including periodicals and research related to the history of King Abdulaziz and the history of the Kingdom of Saudi Arabia in general.
- Disseminate knowledge, culture, and sciences, particularly those related to Arab and Islamic heritage, and contribute to its revival and renewal.
- Provide library services, translation, and scientific publishing in the fields of Arab and Islamic sciences to support the development of scientific research in the Kingdom.
- Support the movement of authorship, translation, and scientific publishing in the fields of Arab and Islamic sciences to advance scientific research in the Kingdom.
- Contribute to serving the community by organizing cultural and scientific lectures, seminars, exhibitions, festivals, and participating in them.
- Build and document Arab and foreign intellectual output related to horses and equestrianism to support specialised research and studies in this field.

== Map Collection ==
"One of the largest publicly available Arabian cartographic collections lies in Riyadh at the King ‘Abd al-‘Aziz Public Library (KAPL). Established in 1985, the KAPL enjoys a growing reputation for the quality of its facilities and collections, the latter ranging from books and manuscripts to coins and photographs. Of particular interest, however, is the library's collection of several hundred maps of Arabia, centered on the 16th to 18th centuries. Since the library's foundation, says Supervisor-General Faisal al-Muaammar, "we were keen to build up a comprehensive collection of maps and charts of Arabia, so that this fascinating material could be made available to scholars and members of the public alike."

The map collection has over 700 rare maps, mostly of the Arabian Peninsula, dating from 1482. These maps are written in English, French, Latin, Italian, German, Dutch, Portuguese, Spanish, Turkish and Arabic. They include examples of some of the greatest cartographers, including Ptolemy, Gastaldi, Ortelius, Munster, Bertius, Hondius, Mercator, Speed, Blaeu, Sanson, Regel, Bowen, Neighbour and Pinkerton.

== Library building and its sections ==
- Reading Halls
- Arabic Books and References Hall
- Foreign Books and References Hall
- Current Newspapers and Periodicals Hall
- Audio-Visual Hall
- King Abdulaziz Hall
- Manuscripts and Rare Collections Hall
- Government Publications Hall
- Bound Periodicals Hall
- Children’s Books

== Manuscripts Section ==
Since its establishment, the library has created a dedicated manuscripts section, housing over 4,500 original manuscripts, in addition to more than 800 paper and microfilm copies, with a total of approximately two million manuscript pages. The section holds numerous historically valuable manuscripts, such as the manuscript titled Taj al-Lugha wa Sahih al-Arabiyya by Abu Nasr Ismail ibn Hammad al-Jawhari, who died in 393 AH/1003 CE, and a manuscript titled Al-Muhadhdhab (Volume 1) on Shafi’i jurisprudence by Ibrahim ibn Muhammad al-Shirazi al-Fayruzabadi, copied in 555 AH. In addition to many other important and rare manuscripts, due to the difficulty of providing original manuscripts to researchers, the library has completed a project to digitize all its manuscripts by electronically scanning all their pages onto magnetic disks, making them available to researchers and enthusiasts worldwide through the library’s website.

== King Abdulaziz Public Library Documents ==
The King Abdulaziz Public Library preserves documents in the King Abdulaziz Hall, divided into:

Original Documents:

- The library holds over sixty documents, most of which revolve around King Abdulaziz, including letters, correspondence, and various documents.

Photographed Documents:

- Photographed on films
- Photographed on slides

The library also includes works such as From Our National Documents, which compiles images of documents held in the library, containing 103 documents, and another titled From King Abdulaziz’s Documents, containing 200 documents. These two books are publications of the National Guard, compiled and prepared by Dr. Abdulrahman Al-Sabit, Dr. Abdulaziz Al-Shuail, Ibrahim Al-Awad, and Saud Al-Roumi. The documents on slides have been published in these books, arranged historically, with the document’s text reproduced in printed form, accompanied by commentary explaining local dialect terms, linguistic terms mentioned in the documents, and some additional notes. At the end of each book, there is a general index and lists of names, places, and topics mentioned in the published documents. The types of documents preserved in the library include:

- Administrative Documents: These include a collection of administrative documents related to state management, such as a document for issuing a passport.
- Letters and Correspondence: The library holds King Abdulaziz’s correspondence sent to his employees concerning state affairs, photographed documents on slides, and those published in the books From Our National Documents and From King Abdulaziz’s Documents. It also includes letters and correspondence of King Abdulaziz.
- Political Documents: The library holds a microfilm copy related to the Kingdom and its foreign policy.
- Religious Documents: The library contains some religious documents related to guidance and advice for Muslims, including a document by Sheikh al-Islam Muhammad ibn Abdulwahhab explaining the essence of Islam and its foundation based on the worship of Allah, and a document by Sheikh Muhammad ibn Abdul Latif Al Al-Sheikh addressed to villagers and tribal leaders, calling them to enjoin good and forbid evil.

== Restoration Centre ==
Restoration at the King Abdulaziz Public Library began in 2003, initially with a restoration lab dedicated to photographs only. Its primary tasks included restoring and treating old photographs (those related to the Kingdom of Saudi Arabia and some Arab countries) from the era of King Abdulaziz Al Saud, may God rest his soul, as these photographs are considered rare acquisitions that must be restored and preserved. In 2021, the development of a comprehensive restoration centre for all forms of cultural heritage began, equipped with the latest tools. The centre was inaugurated on June 21, 2022. The centre’s primary tasks include “sterilisation, restoration and treatment, sewing and binding, and preservation” of rare and valuable cultural heritage sources. Restoration is not limited to necessary repair and treatment work but also extends to creating suitable conditions for their safety and preservation to facilitate access and benefit from them in the future. By the end of 2024, the lab had restored over 27,000 items, restored more than 350 leather items (rare items, manuscripts, books, and Qur’ans), and sterilised over 61,000 materials.

== Equestrian Studies Centre ==
An Equestrian Studies Centre was established within the library’s main headquarters, equipped with key Arabic and foreign books and references on equestrianism, totaling 3,000 books. The library’s scientific committee commissioned a Saudi researcher to collect, organize, and document intellectual output on horses and equestrianism, including books, articles, manuscripts, and periodicals in Arabic and foreign languages, to form the foundation for building a database in this field. The database is divided into two sections: one for Arabic materials, named Horse, and another for non-Arabic materials, named Horsel.

== Encyclopedia of the Kingdom of Saudi Arabia ==
This is a series of comprehensive documentary volumes about the Kingdom and its thirteen regions, providing a detailed record of the Kingdom’s historical, geographical, cultural, social, and touristic aspects, in addition to accurately documenting its development and achievements. The King Abdulaziz Public Library initiated this major national project. Due to the previous scarcity of documented and comprehensive information about the Kingdom, this encyclopedia is the first of its kind in terms of documentation, comprehensiveness, and dissemination, supported by images, documents, illustrative maps, and statistical data. The encyclopedia consists of 36 volumes, with two volumes for each region of the Kingdom—one in Arabic and one in English. It is also available electronically on magnetic disks and fully published on the project’s website, titled Encyclopedia of the Kingdom of Saudi Arabia Project, making it accessible to internet users.

== Unified Arab Index Center ==
This is one of the projects of the King Abdulaziz Public Library, focused on preserving and disseminating Arab intellectual heritage and fostering a collaborative environment among Saudi and Arab libraries by adopting international standards for bibliographic description. It also provides books in digital format as part of the Unified Arab Digital Library project.

== Photography Center ==
The King Abdulaziz Public Library owns a valuable collection of photographs containing over 6,239 original prints, representing various aspects of life during a significant historical period from the mid-19th century to the early 20th century. Part of this collection includes views of the Middle East as seen through the eyes of notable visitors to the region, including political figures, diplomats, military officers, explorers, and adventurers. Among these visitors are globally renowned figures such as Dumas, Bonfils, Zangaki, Mirza, Tcherliye, Rochester, Ferillo, Firth, and others. The collection also highlights the work of some local photographers who practiced photography. The collection is not limited to views of the Arabian Peninsula but includes a significant visual record of Egypt, Lebanon, Palestine, the Fertile Crescent, Turkey, Iran, Greece, Italy, Malta, and Bosnia. The photographs cover scenes representing various aspects of life in the Holy Lands of the Kingdom and Al-Aqsa Mosque, as well as scenes documenting social life at the time, such as desert caravans, markets, and gathering places. The collection reflects much of the region’s architectural arts during that period, as depicted in images of mosque designs, palaces, and historical buildings, as well as fine arts, costumes, and social rituals. The library employs modern methods for preserving and restoring photographs, aiming to restore the paper texture of the photograph to a state close to its original condition and recover the photograph’s colors as they were originally. This process involves multiple stages that can extend over several days and undergoes approximately 12 treatment processes to gradually refine the photograph without compromising its original details or the photographer’s signature. Digital preservation of the photographs is also available in high resolution, making them accessible to everyone. The photographs are then included in an organized catalog within an electronic database framework.

== China Branch ==
A branch of the King Abdulaziz Library was established at Peking University following a Council of Ministers’ decision on 14/2/1430 AH, which authorized the Secretary-General of the King Abdulaziz Public Library to discuss a memorandum of understanding with the Chinese side regarding the procedures for establishing the branch. The agreement was officially signed in the presence of King Abdullah bin Abdulaziz and Chinese President Hu Jintao on February 10, 2009. The library branch occupies an area of 13,000 square meters, consisting of six floors. It includes reading and research halls accommodating over 100 researchers and visitors, with a capacity for more than 200,000 books and knowledge materials over an area of 500 square meters, a lecture hall, a center for specialized exhibitions, a center for Chinese-Arab studies, a library for ancient manuscripts at Peking University, and administrative offices accommodating over 40 employees.

== See also ==
- List of things named after Saudi kings
