= Fazal Nawaz Jung =

Indian civil servant (1894–1964)

Nawab Fazal Nawaz Jung Bahadur
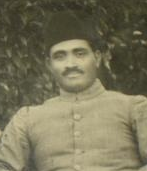
- Born: Syed Fazlullah c. 1894; Hyderabad, Deccan, British India
- Died: 1964; Hyderabad, Andhra Pradesh, India
- Occupation: Civil service
- Title: Revenue Minister, Speaker of Assembly

Nawab Fazal Nawaz Jung Bahadur (c. 1894-1964) was a noted Hyderabadi politician and financier during the period of the Nizam of Hyderabad Mir Osman Ali Khan, Asaf Jah VII.

== Birth and Family ==
He was born Syed Fazlullah in Hyderabad, India to a family of ancient Arab nobility. His father's antecedents traced their lineage to Muhammad, insuring their position in the upper classes of Hyderabadi society. The family were singular for their piety and devotion to the disadvantaged classes, though they were not known for their particular wealth. However, the successful political career of their most famous son would launch the family to a level of prominence in the Raj rivaling that of the Nizam himself.

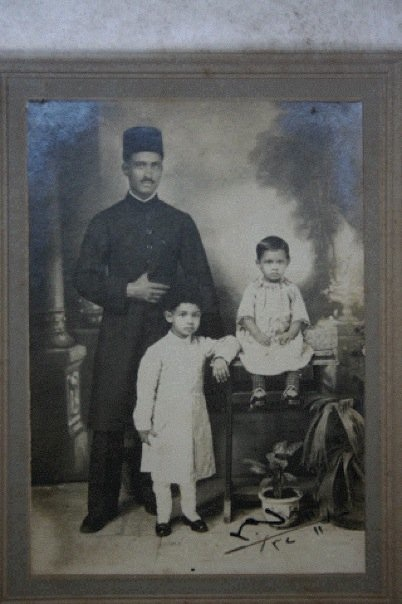
Fazal Nawaz Jung with son Arif Sajjad and daughter Akther Begum

== Marriage, children and early life ==
Fazal Nawaz Jung married the sahibzadi Habeeba Begum, a lady of an illustrious and prodigiously wealthy Delhi family whose father was known to be one of Hyderabad's richest men. Habeeba's father descended in the male line from Mohammed Fakhruddin Faridi, Prime Minister to the Mughal Emperor, and Baba Farid Shakargunj with his mazaar shareef at Pak Patan Pakistan. The alliance between the two families made Habeeba a noblewoman of Hyderabad, the most important of India's princely states at a time when the Mughal court was in decline. Fazal, on the other hand, received access to an immense fortune with which to further his political ambitions. With the assets of Habeeba, Fazal Nawaz Jung was able to purchase a vast property in Somajiguda (see photographs) and built a large estate in which he housed his own family and several of his sisters. Prominent neighbors included Liaqat Jung, famed owner of "Lal Bangla" and Prince Azam Jah at Bella Vista Palace. Deceased members of his family, including his sisters, are buried at Masjid-e-Subhani in Somajiguda today.

From Habeeba Begum, he had five children including Arif Sajjad, Akther Begum, Asad Mumtaz, Nayyar Begum, and Kishwar Begum. Following her unexpected and unexplained death, Fazal Nawaz Jung remarried: first to a relative of Habeeba Begum, Nasir Jahan Begum from whom he had no issues. He subsequently married Mehboob Bee Saheba, from whom he had one son Mir Ali Hyder. Lastly, he married Asmathunisa Begum, from whom he had three children. Namely Shakila Begum (Shakila)' Syed shujath Ali (Mazhar) and Fazilath Begum (Queenie).

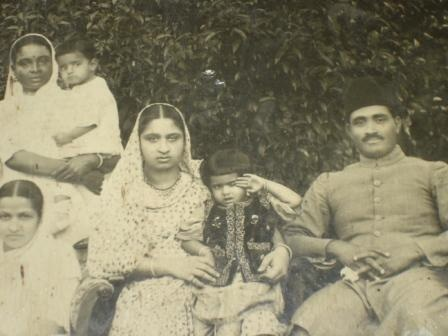
Fazal Nawaz Jung with wife Habeeba Begum

== Political career ==
About 1910, Syed Fazlullah was appointed to the Hyderabadi Parliament by a royal farman of Osman Ali Khan, Asaf Jah VII as Speaker of the Assembly and given rights to title himself as Jung for that period in office. Later, he was made Revenue Minister and granted the style of Nawab Fazal Nawaz Jung. First as Speaker of the House, then as Revenue Minister, Fazal Nawaz Jung led Hyderabad through its own Gilded Age, a time when the princely state's Nizam was counted among the wealthiest men in the world. Notable achievements included establishment of the Hyderabad Co-operative Society.

After Operation Polo and Police Action, he was placed under house arrest as were several of the other ministers of the Nizam's Government. Investigations by the Government of India revealed no criminal activities, and Fazal Nawaz Jung was found innocent.

== Death ==
Following his political career, Fazal Nawaz Jung maintained an active social life and served as the patriarch of his large family. He had vast properties in Somajiguda, Banjara Hills and Shaikpet which underwent disputes following his death in 1964 and remain largely unsettled.

He died from a sudden heart attack at Parade Grounds, Hyderabad on 15 August on Independence Day. He died while the National Anthem of India was playing on Parade Grounds, and the Chief Minister carried the body home with his body covered by the Indian Flag. He is buried in the cemetery of the Sufi saint Yousuf Saab, in Nampally, Hyderabad, India.
