= Faisal Al-Mousawi =

Bahraini politician

Faisal bin Radhi Al-Mousawi (Arabic: فيصل رضي الموسوي; born 6 May 1944) is a Bahraini physician and politician.

== Biography ==
Al-Mousawi was born on April 6, 1944. He earned a Bachelor of Medicine, Bachelor of Surgery from Cairo University in 1967. He worked as an associate professor at Arabian Gulf University for a time in his native country. Al-Mousawi then joined Salmaniya Medical Complex in 1976, where he became a consultant orthopedic surgeon and rose to director of surgery and chief physician in 1982. In 1984, he was promoted to assistant undersecretary for training and planning at the Ministry of Health in 1984. After serving as minister of health from 1995 to 2002, he was given a royal appointment to the Consultative Council, the upper house of Parliament, serving there from 2002 to 2006. He chaired the council for a time.

In 2009, Al-Mousawi was appointed president of the Royal College of Surgeons in Ireland – Medical University of Bahrain. He had previously served as chairman of the RCSI Bahrain board of governors.
