= Faisal al-Hamar =

Bahraini politician

Minister of Health
- In office 2007 – 26 February 2011
- Monarch: Hamad ibn Isa Al Khalifa
- Prime Minister: Khalifa bin Salman Al Khalifa
- Preceded by: Nada Haffadh

Faisal al-Hamar is a Bahraini politician who served as the Minister of Health of Bahrain, from 2007 to 2011. He was sacked by Hamad ibn Isa Al Khalifa in response to the 2011 Bahraini protests.

== Tenure ==
During his tenure as health minister, he oversaw the country's response to the Swine flu pandemic in 2009.
