= Faisal Helwani =

Lebanese-Ghanaian record producer

- Born: 27 March 1946
- Died: July 27, 2008 (aged 62); Lebanon
- Known for: Producing E.T. Mensah, Edikanfo Music, Managing Fela Kuti, Founding member of MUSIGA

Faisal Helwani (1946 – July 27, 2008) was a Lebanese-Ghanaian record producer and artist manager.

Born in Sekondi, Ghana in 1946, Helwani was one of the founding members of the Musicians Union of Ghana (MUSIGA), CEO of Bibini Music, the first president of the Phonogram Producer's Society of Ghana and the first president of the International Federation of Phonogram Industries, Ghana Branch.

== Career ==
He was the owner of the Napoleon Club which hosted stars such as Stevie Wonder in the 1960s.

Helwani was also known for managing acts like Edikanfo Band and the Nigerian musician, Fela Kuti. Other artists he worked with include E.T. Mensah, Onipa Nua, and Hugh Masekela.

== Death ==
Helwani died on July 27, 2008, in Lebanon where he was seeking medical attention. He was married to Victoria Medie Helwani, and had six children.
