= COVID-19 pandemic in Bahrain =

Ongoing COVID-19 viral pandemic in Bahrain

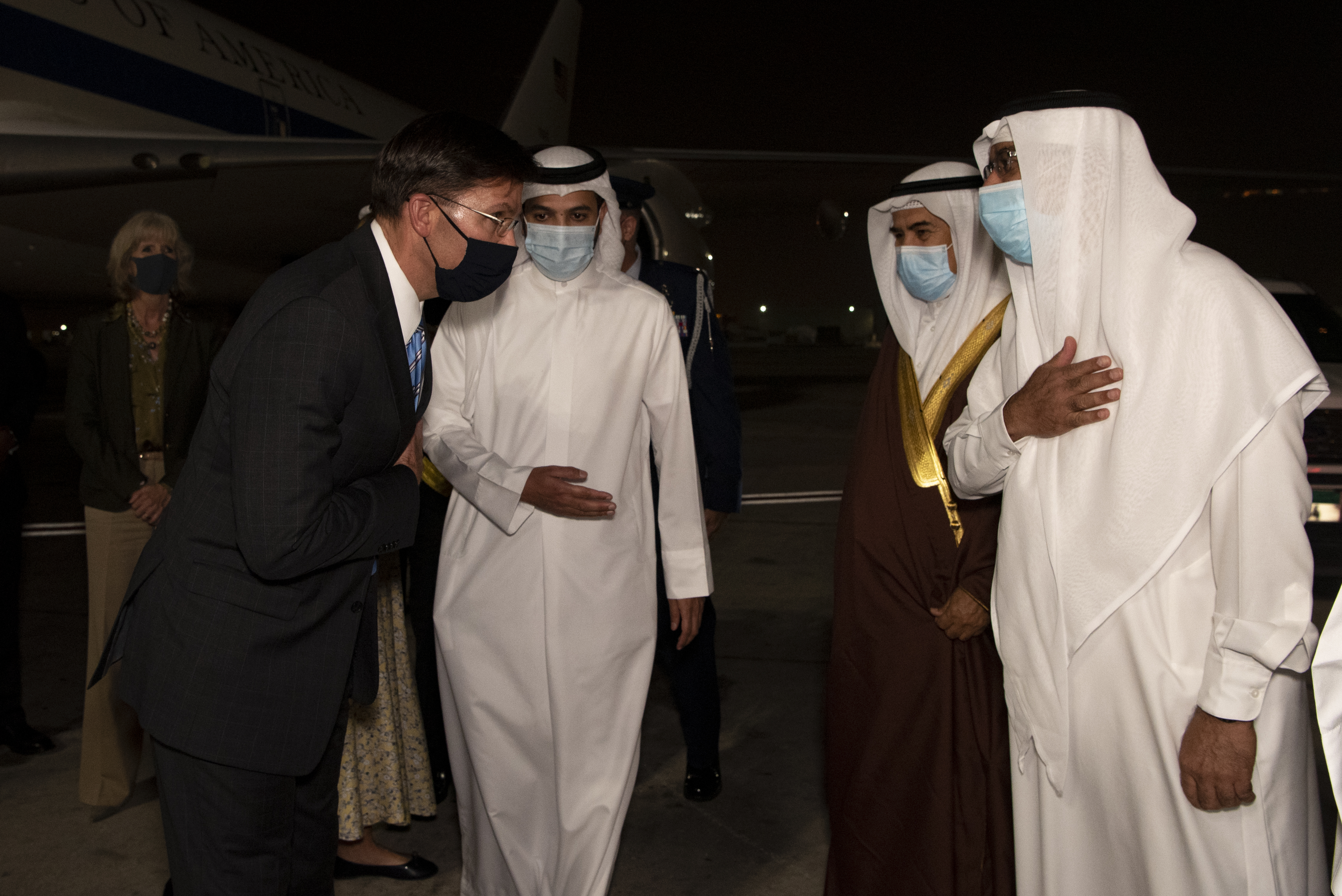
- Dignitaries in Manama, Bahrain (2020)
- Disease: COVID-19
- Pathogen: SARS-CoV-2
- Location: Bahrain
- First outbreak: Wuhan, Hubei, China
- Index case: Manama
- Arrival date: 21 February 2020 (6 years, 7 months, 1 week and 2 days)
- Confirmed cases: 696,614
- Active cases: 5,743
- Recovered: 494,419
- Deaths: 1,536
- Fatality rate: 0.22%
- Vaccinations: 1,241,174 (total vaccinated); 1,226,796 (fully vaccinated); 3,476,633 (doses administered)

Government website
- healthalert.gov.bh/en/

The COVID-19 pandemic in Bahrain was a part of the worldwide pandemic of coronavirus disease 2019 (COVID-19) caused by severe acute respiratory syndrome coronavirus 2 (SARS-CoV-2). The virus was confirmed to have reached Bahrain on 21 February 2020. By December 2022, the country reported over 696,000 confirmed cases of COVID-19, resulting in 1,548 deaths.

Bahrain's handling of the pandemic received praise from the World Health Organization, which launched a case study into the Kingdom's response in 2022.

== Background ==
On 12 January 2020, the World Health Organization (WHO) confirmed that a novel coronavirus was the cause of a respiratory illness in a cluster of people in Wuhan City, Hubei Province, China, which was reported to the WHO on 31 December 2019.

The case fatality ratio for COVID-19 has been much lower than SARS of 2003, but the transmission has been significantly greater, with a significant total death toll.

== Timeline ==
=== February 2020 ===
COVID-19 awareness poster in Manama, July 2020.

On 21 February, Bahrain confirmed the first COVID-19 cases, a school bus driver who came from Iran via Dubai.

On 24 February, a Bahraini woman arriving at the Bahrain International Airport from Iran via Dubai was examined as part of the precautionary measures and tested positive for SARS-CoV-2. She had arrived from Iran with her husband and sister in-law. Everyone was moved to isolation. Bahrain suspended all flights from Dubai Airport and Sharjah Airport for 48 hours. It also announced a travel ban on Iran.

On 25 February, Bahrain confirmed nine new cases, raising the total count to 17 cases. The nine cases involved four Bahraini women and two Bahraini men coming from Iran via Sharjah, two Saudi women coming from Iran through Sharjah and one Bahraini coming through Dubai. On the same day, Bahrain suspended all schools, nurseries and universities for two weeks to curb the spread of COVID-19 infection. CBSE exams were postponed.

On 26 February, Bahrain confirmed nine new cases, raising the total count to 26 cases, including three new cases involving three women travelling to the country from Iran.

Civil Aviation Affairs in Bahrain announced that suspension of flights to and from Dubai International Airport was extended for an additional 48 hours. Flights to and from Iraq and Lebanon were suspended until further notice. The Health Ministry announced compulsory health check ups for all citizens and residents who traveled to Iran in February.

On 27 February, Bahrain confirmed seven new cases, raising the total count to 33 cases. Most of the new cases came from Iran via indirect flights. Infected individuals were taken to Ebrahim Khalil Kanoo Community Medical Center for isolation. On 28 February, Bahrain confirmed two new cases, a Bahraini national and a Saudi Arabia national who had come from Iran via indirect flights. As of 28 February, there have been 38 confirmed cases in Bahrain.

=== March 2020 ===
On 8 March, the Health minister of Bahrain said that there are 94 confirmed cases and 14 recovered cases.

On 12 March, hundreds of prisoners were ordered released. At this point, among countries with at least one million citizens, Bahrain had the world's fourth-highest per capita rate of positive COVID-19 cases in the world, at 114.6 cases per million people (twice the rate of China).

On 16 March, the Ministry of Health reported that a 65-year-old Bahraini woman had died from the coronavirus, marking the first death in Bahrain and the Persian Gulf region from the disease. The woman was believed to have chronic diseases. On the same day, the national coronavirus task force launched an appeal for volunteers to provide medical and administrative support during the crisis. The Civil Aviation Authority also announced a significant reduction of incoming flights to Bahrain.

Face mask awareness poster in Manama.

On 17 March, the Bahraini government unveiled an $11.39 billion stimulus package to support the country's economy during the pandemic, also covering water and electricity bills over the next 3 months.

On 22 March, a 51 year old Bahraini female was reported to have died from coronavirus, becoming the second confirmed death in the country. The woman contracted the disease while in Iran and was amongst a group of Bahrainis repatriated from the country in February. She was believed to have had chronic health problems and was quarantined upon arrival to Bahrain. On the same day, Bahrain banned public gatherings of more than 5 individuals with all gatherings in public parks and beaches being strictly prohibited - violators could be punished by a fine of 5000 Bahraini dinars (Note: equivalent to US $13,520, UK £10,658 as of 2020.03.29) and/or 3 years imprisonment. The country also announced it was participating in the World Health Organization's SOLIDARITY trial which researches new evidence-based treatment modalities for coronavirus - being the first such Arab country to participate.

On 23 March, the National Taskforce for Combating the Coronavirus designated the Bahrain International Exhibition & Convention Centre as the main testing centre for COVID-19. The centre is divided into three separate halls depending on COVID-19 exposure, a rapid treatment area, and a pharmacy. It has at least 500 beds and 1,200 seats for patients.

On 24 March, a 65-year-old Bahraini male with chronic illnesses died of the coronavirus, becoming the third confirmed death in the country. Bahrain banned the export of hand sanitizers and detergents for a period of 3 months owing to unprecedented domestic demand. The same day, the Central Bank of Bahrain ordered currency exchange companies to sterilise local and international currencies by exposing banknotes to ultraviolet germicidal irradiation, high temperatures, or isolating them for at least three days as a precautionary act to safeguard bank employees and the public. The country's lower house of parliament approved an urgent proposal for a partial curfew from 6 pm to 5 am which is to be reviewed by the upper house of parliament. Only 23 out of the 40 MPs were present during the three-hour session and 19 voted in favour, with 2 against and 2 abstaining. On 25 March, a 78-year-old Bahraini male with chronic illnesses reportedly died of the coronavirus, becoming the fourth confirmed death in the country. On the same day, a group of 61 Bahraini pilgrims were evacuated from Iran on a chartered flight and placed in quarantine or treatment centers, 30% of whom tested positive for COVID-19.

The executive committee of the Bahraini government announced the closure of all non-essential commercial enterprises from March 26 onward. Exceptions to this rule included supermarkets, banks, bakeries, and healthcare facilities. The closure would take effect at 7 pm on March 26 and last until 7 pm on April 9. All businesses will be allowed to re-open from April 9 to April 23.

On 28 March, the National Health Regulatory Authority announced that asymptomatic patients can seek private healthcare treatment at their own expense at the Regis Hotel, Best Western Hotel, and Taj Plaza Hotel which would be staffed by healthcare professionals from the Middle East Hospital. A later announcement on 17 April 2020 by the Regis Hotel owner Varghese Kurian declared that Bahrainis would be treated for free at that specific hotel. Furthermore, the Novotel Hotel is also staffed by medical staff from the Bahrain Specialist Hospital.

On 30 March, the Ministry of Health set up COVID-19 sampling stations in Manama, Durrat Al Bahrain and Budaiya, aimed at processing random test samples from the elderly and populations at risk to the virus. This included workers in supermarkets, bakeries and pharmacies. The Civil Defence announced that it had conducted 5,618 disinfection operations across the country. St. Christopher's School began 3D-printing face visors for healthcare staff at the Bahrain Defence Force Hospital and Awali Cardiac Centre.

On 31 March, Bahrain's Information & eGovernment Authority released the BeAware Bahrain application on the Apple & Google Play store. The application uses GPS location data to alert users about nearby active cases of COVID-19 or locations visited by positive cases of the disease.

=== April 2020 ===
On 1 April, the Ministry of Health announced over 316 patients with COVID-19 have recovered since the start of the outbreak and that more than 34,159 people had been tested for the virus.

On 6 April, the iGA began distributing electronic waterproof wristbands with location-tracking to monitor individuals under home quarantine. The measures were announced to reduce the spread of COVID-19 from non-compliant quarantined individuals; the wristband is paired with the user's smartphone and sends an automatic warning once there is a 15-metre distance between the two. Violators are liable to imprisonment for 3 months and a fine of 1000-10000 Bahraini dinars. Random testing of the population revealed a Bangladeshi man testing positive for COVID-19. Contact tracing revealed all 15 of his neighbours in the same building had also tested positive - all of whom have been quarantined.

On 7 April, the Ministry of Health announced 55 new cases of COVID-19, bringing the total active cases to 349. The Ministry also revealed a total of 50,127 individuals had been tested for the virus. On the same day, the Ministry also announced the 5th death due to COVID-19; a 70 year old Bahraini man with chronic diseases. The Bahraini Ministry of Foreign Affairs have announced that the country had repatriated 1,200 Bahrainis worldwide since the start of the pandemic in January. The government announced a continuation of restrictions on public gatherings but permitted the opening of commercial enterprises from April 9 to April 23, provided that they follow hygiene guidelines. The government also announced that wearing face masks is mandatory while in public.

On 8 April, the government announced that it would spend US$570 million to pay for the salaries of all Bahraini employees (an estimated 100,000) working in the private sector from April to June 2020.

On 10 April, the Ministry of Health announced the 6th death from COVID-19; a 63 year old Bahraini male with chronic illnesses who had returned from Iran. On the same day, the Bahrain Defence Force Hospital opened a 130-bed field intensive care unit, intended for treating COVID-19 patients. The field unit took 7 days to establish and is located on the third floor of the hospital's car park.

On 13 April, the Ministry of Health announced the largest spike of confirmed cases of COVID-19 with 212 new cases, of which 206 were migrant workers.

On 15 April, the Ministry of Health announced the 7th death from COVID-19; a 60 year old Bahraini male with chronic illnesses who contracted the virus from a returnee. On the same day, it was announced that 3 public bus drivers had tested positive for COVID-19 during random testing at a labour camp in Askar, this led to reductions in bus route frequencies and schedule changes.

On 16 April, the Royal Humanitarian Foundation launched the Feena Khair (There is Good in Us) campaign that aims to collect financial and material donations to assist in tackling the pandemic in Bahrain. Donations received include food, medical equipment and at least 5 million BHD.

On 17 April, 44 new cases of COVID-19 were announced; 22 were returnees from Iran, 10 contracted the disease from contacts, 2 were migrant workers while the aetiology of the spread is unspecified in the remaining 10 patients. On 18 April, 125 stranded Bahraini nationals in India were evacuated from Pune and brought back to the country.

On 22 April, the Bahraini Government Executive Committee announced the extension of social-distancing protocols into the Islamic month of Ramadan, adding that the general public should refrain from attending public iftars, ghabgas, and majlises.

On 23 April, the Ministry of Industry and Commerce opened a virtual mall website called mall.bh. The e-service was set up to enable more than 100 participating shops to sell goods and services to customers amid physical closures of stores.

On 24 April, the country reported its largest single-day increase in new cases, with 301 confirmed cases of COVID-19 detected, 212 of whom are migrant workers.

On 25 April, the government announced it converted a number of public transport buses into mobile testing centres.

On 27 April, research from Google reportedly showed that Bahrain had the least reduction in mobility (-21.2%) amongst the Gulf Cooperation Council states, largely believed to be due to an avoidance of a complete lockdown as opposed to its neighbours.

By the end of April and as Ramadan began, the country announced that total active cases had reached 1,493 out of a total of 2,811 confirmed cases since the outbreak began, in addition to 121,706 tests being conducted in total.

=== May 2020 ===
On 13 May, 31 members of the same family had all tested positive for COVID-19 after not following appropriate social distance protocols.

On 14 May, Bahrain's National Health Regulatory Authority issued permits to private hospitals to conduct COVID-19 testing on non-infected patients or asymptomatic cases for a fee. The samples would still be sent to the public health laboratory for testing.

On 18 May, the country reported that total active cases exceeded 4,000 individuals and that the total number of tests stood at 236,828.

On 29 May, Bahraini police arrested a man who claimed COVID-19 was a hoax and for spreading false news in contravention of the country's public health law .

=== June 2020 ===
At the start of June 2020, the country reported a total number of 11,804 infected cases of COVID-19 with 19 deaths to date.

On 8 June, Bahrain reported the highest number of COVID-19 positive cases recorded in a single day with 654 cases. The following day, it was revealed through contact tracing that one COVID-19 positive patient had directly and indirectly infected 91 people with the virus.

On 18 June, the Bahraini newspaper Al Watan reported the termination of a large number of foreigners in the public sector, according to an anonymous parliamentary source. The paper also reported the government studying plans to continue subsidies on electricity and water for citizens. Government statistics revealed that Bahrain's exports fell to 55% of normal, passenger traffic at Bahrain International Airport reduced by 98%, and occupancy rates at hotels fell by 72% since the start of the pandemic. Bahrain also reported the highest number of COVID-19 deaths recorded in a single day with 6 deaths, raising the total death toll to 55.

On 22 June, the first doctor to die from COVID-19 in Bahrain was reported by the media. Soloman Vinay Kumar was a primary care physician who worked at the American Mission Hospital and died after a four-week battle in intensive care.

June was the deadliest month in Bahrain, after the country reported 68 deaths from COVID-19 over the course of the month.

=== July - December 2020 ===
In July 2020, the Indian embassy in Bahrain reported that up to 25,000 Indian nationals in the country were to be evacuated as part of India's international repatriation efforts. Over 8,000 Indians have already left the country since the start of the outbreak.

In November and December 2020, the National Health Regulatory Authority of Bahrain approved EUAs for the Sinopharm BIBP and the Pfizer–BioNTech vaccines, respectively.

Formula One driver, Lewis Hamilton has tested positive for the virus just 2 days after winning the Bahrain Grand Prix. As a result, he missed the Sakhir Grand Prix that was scheduled on 6 December. Hamilton's seat was replaced by fellow countryman who became the Mercedes' reserve driver and current Williams driver, George Russell. The impact of Lewis Hamilton's virus case not only for George Russell, but also Formula 2 driver who racing for Campos Racing, and also Williams reserve driver, Jack Aitken, will make his F1 debut.

=== January 2021 - April 2021 ===
In January 2021, Bahrain witnessed a 43% increase in COVID-19 cases compared to December 2020 figures, with an estimated 17% being children. This was attributed by the National COVID-19 Task Force to complacency and non-adherence to public health measures. During the same month, the country announced mobile vaccination units to inoculate the elderly and bedbound population in their homes. According to the government task force, a total of 143,596 individuals had been vaccinated against COVID-19 by 20 January 2021 since rollout started in the previous month. This placed Bahrain as the third most vaccinated country per 100 people worldwide at the time (at 8.4%). On 27 January, Bahrain announced its first case of the variant COVID-19 strain.

In March 2021, Bahrain turned Sitra Mall into a vaccination hub, where four vaccines are offered for free to the general public: the Pfizer–BioNTech, Sinopharm BIBP and Oxford–AstraZeneca vaccines, and Sputnik V. The mall was previously deserted as a result of the pandemic and had only hosted a few shops in addition to a supermarket. The Bahraini health minister Faeqa Al Saleh announced that the country had temporarily employed 630 foreign health workers since the start of the pandemic in February 2020.

In early April 2021, Amnesty International reported that the Bahraini authorities had illustrated a lack of respect for the rules to treat prisoners and failure at ensuring the right to health for prisoners. Testimonies given by the family members of the prisoners indicated that the Jaw prison was already housing scores of potential Covid-positive cases among others. The prison in question has also been reported to have experienced overcrowding issues making the government's claims of having the situation under control seem dubious.

Three Belgian parliamentarians in April 2021 wrote to the Minister of Foreign Affairs of Belgium, Sophie Wilmès, demanding her to urge the Bahraini government to look into the COVID-19 situation inside its prisons. Amongst the three parliamentarians, MP François De Smet cited that difficulty in controlling communicable diseases inside prisons is a global issue. The French MP appreciated the release of 1500 prisoners in March 2020 due to rising Covid cases, but also highlighted the continued unfair detention of 12 civil society representatives.

=== May 2021 - July 2021 ===
May 2021 coincided with the second wave of COVID-19 cases in the country, resulting in weekly positivity rates of more than 20,000 cases in late May with a corresponding peak mortality of 152 during the same month.

Between 1 January and 31 May 2021, 665 people died from COVID-19 of whom 90% were unvaccinated. On June 1, the number of ICU admissions for COVID-19 patients totaled at 326, of whom 83% were unvaccinated. The Ministry of Health also announced raising the country's daily vaccination capabilities to 31,000 patients a day. On 3 June 2021, the country's National Health Regulatory Authority approved Sotrovimab, a monoclonal antibody, for emergency use in mild to moderate severity COVID-19 patients. This was offered part of the country's new outpatient COVID-19 therapeutics clinic program, alongside the use of nirmatrelvir/ritonavir (Paxlovid) to reduce disease morbidity and strain on the healthcare sector. In the same month, Bahrain's sovereign wealth fund Mumtalakat signed a memorandum of understanding with Russian Direct Investment Fund and Binnopharm to manufacture and export the Sputnik V vaccine in the MENA region.

In June 2021, a number of newspapers reported that Bahrain is planning to role out a booster shot of the Pfizer vaccine for the elderly and health-compromised individuals who already received the Sinopharm BIBP vaccine. Despite the purported lack of efficacy from the Chinese vaccine to protect those populations from illness, the nation was able to reduce infections 8-fold from May 29 to June 23, 2021, mostly through the use of the Sinopharm vaccine.

By the end of July 2021, approximately 1 million people in Bahrain received 2 doses of a COVID-19 vaccine accounting for 70% of the eligible population at the time. The estimated daily death rate at this time was 0.03 per 100,000 people.

=== August 2021 - August 2022 ===
Case positivity rates continued to decline from the summer of 2021 until January 2022 when a surge of cases were detected of the novel Omicron variant. The first Omicron case was detected in December 2021 in the country. By February 2022, over 100,000 cases of COVID-19 was reported in Bahrain with 14 deaths. The overall case fatality rate with the Omicron variant in Bahrain was significantly lesser compared to the Delta variant; this was thought to be due to the now-immunised population and that the Omicron variant was itself less virulent. Another wave of COVID-19 hit Bahrain in June 2022 with 13,000 weekly cases being reported at the time although with no significant change to the weekly mortality rate.

Bahrain suspended its traffic light system of quarantine and public health measures in March 2022.

In July 2022, the World Health Organization praised Bahrain's response to the COVID-19 pandemic and announced a case study into the Kingdom's response to identify learning points for future pandemics.

== Statistics ==
=== Confirmed new cases per day ===
View source data.

=== Confirmed deaths per day ===
View source data.

== See also ==
- COVID-19 pandemic in Asia
- Healthcare in Bahrain
- Health in Bahrain
