= Ministry of Health (Bahrain) =

Government ministry of Bahrain

- MOH Office in Al Khair Towers, Sanabis

Ministry overview
- Type: Government Ministry
- Jurisdiction: Cabinet of Bahrain
- Headquarters: Diplomatic Area, Manama
- Minister responsible: Dr. Jaleela bint Sayed Jawad Hassan
- Website: www.moh.gov.bh

The Ministry of Health is responsible for providing integrated preventive and curative health services, through a network of primary, secondary and tertiary health care facilities, in the Kingdom of Bahrain. These healthcare services are provided in coordination with other ministries, private sector and the community.

The current Minister of Health is Dr. Jaleela bint Sayed Jawad Hassan since June 2022. Earlier to this role, she was the Chief Executive Officer of primary health care centers.

The former Minister was Faeqa bint Saeed Al Saleh serving in this position from 1 October 2015. She had also served earlier in Bahrain's Cabinet, as the Minister of Social Development during 2014–2015. Earlier to that, she was the Assistant Secretary General of the League of Arab States (LAS)—Head of Social Affairs Sector.

== Types of Healthcare ==
All three forms of healthcare, Primary, Secondary and Tertiary, is available in Bahrain along with highly specialized services. Primary healthcare in Bahrain is mostly provided from 23 health centres distributed across the four governorates of Bahrain. Free treatment is provided for all Bahrainis, while foreigners are required to pay seven Dinars (US$18) per visit. Citizens and Residents can book their medical appointments online for the General Clinics at the Health Centers.

The health centers provide a range of support services including the following,

- Lab
- Pharmacy
- Radiology
- Social Search
- Health and Transformational Services
- Medical Records
- Physiotherapy

Primary and secondary healthcare is also provided by many private hospitals, including American Mission Hospital, the oldest in the country and the region.

Secondary and tertiary healthcare is provided for citizens and residents, from the following government hospitals.

- Salmaniya Medical Complex
- Bahrain Defence Force Royal Medical Services
- King Hamad University Hospital

== Directorates ==
The following directorates come under the Ministry of Health, as per the ministry's organization structure.

- Public Health Directorate
- Health Promotion Directorate
- Human Resource Directorate
- Financial Resource Directorate
- Information and Planning Directorate
- Backup Services Directorate
- Communication Directorate

== Ministers ==
1. Ms. Faeqa bint Saeed Al Saleh - 1 October 2015 to 14 June 2022
2. Dr. Jaleela bint Sayed Jawad Hassan - 15 June 2022 -

== Recent activities ==
In its fight against Covid-19, Bahrain's Ministry of Health and the National Health Regulatory Authority approved the Sinopharm BIBP vaccine of China, in December 2020, and began administering it, to its citizens and residents. After Britain, Bahrain also became the second nation in the world to approve the Pfizer–BioNTech COVID-19 vaccine in the same month.

In January 2021, Bahrain announced the approval of a third vaccine, the Oxford–AstraZeneca COVID-19 vaccine, from Serum Institute of India, among the choices of vaccines that the people of Bahrain can opt for, when getting vaccinated against Covid-19.

Bahrain launched the world's first vaccine appointment app, which allowed people to choose from two vaccines, but now has added the third to its options.

Reaching 100,000 vaccinations in just one month, for the small nation of Bahrain, is also a remarkable achievement. The shots are being administered from Ministry of Health's 27 health centres and the King Hamad University Hospital (KHUH) in Bahrain.

Bahrain also launched mobile vaccination units for seniors and individuals with special needs. It is the first of its kind in the GCC, an initiative that allows medical teams to make home visits to provide one of two approved COVID-19 vaccines to those unable to attend dedicated centres.

On 26 January 2021, Bahrain also granted an emergency use authorisation for the Oxford–AstraZeneca COVID-19 vaccine, and it became the third such approval in the kingdom. According to Gulf News

The vaccine is produced by the AstraZeneca Company in cooperation with Oxford University and is manufactured in India. The approval comes on the basis of a study conducted by Bahrain’s National Health Regulatory Authority (NHRA) with participation of an inoculation committee at the Health Ministry.

The fourth Vaccine approved by Bahrain’s NHRA is Sputnik V COVID-19 vaccine.

The National Health Regulatory Authority (NHRA) has also authorized, as the fifth vaccine, the emergency use of Janssen COVID-19 vaccine from Johnson and Johnson. Bahrain became the first country in the world to approve this particular vaccine.

== See also ==
- Healthcare in Bahrain
- National Health Regulatory Authority
- List of hospitals in Bahrain
