= List of hospitals in Bahrain =

This is a list of hospitals in Bahrain. Hospitals in Bahrain can be classified into public hospitals (funded by the Ministry of Health or the Bahrain Defence Force) and private hospitals.

All hospitals are subject to inspection and accreditation by the National Health Regulatory Authority (NHRA), an independent regulatory body established in 2010.

== Public hospitals ==
=== Civilian ===
- Salmaniya Medical Complex, Salmaniya.
- Psychiatric Hospital (Bahrain), Salmaniya

=== Military ===
- Bahrain Royal Medical Services, Riffa.
- King Hamad University Hospital, Busaiteen.

King Hamad American Mission Hospital, A'ali.

== Private hospitals ==
- American Mission Hospital, which operates branches in Manama and A'ali.
- Bahrain Specialist Hospital, Juffair
- Gulf Diabetes Specialist Center

== Defunct hospitals ==
- Victoria Memorial Hospital opened shortly afterwards in 1905 but was closed down in 1948.
- International Hospital of Bahrain - closed in June 2018.

== See also ==
- Healthcare in Bahrain
- Health in Bahrain
- List of burn centres in Bahrain
