= Ali bin Abdullah Al Khalifa =

Bahraini politician

Ali bin Abdullah Al Khalifa (Arabic: علي بن عبد الله آل خليفة, died August 11, 2009) was a Bahraini politician.

== Career ==
Born in Muharraq, he earned a Bachelor of Medicine, Bachelor of Surgery from Cairo University and a Fellowship of Surgery from the Royal College of Physicians and Surgeons of Glasgow. He served as Medical Director at Bahrain Defence Force Hospital, Associate Professor at Arabian Gulf University, President of the Royal Academy of Physicians and Specialists in Bahrain, and President of the Arab Federation of Sports Medicine. He was appointed to the Consultative Council or Shura Council in 2002 and held the post until his death in 2009.
