= BSH =

BSH may refer to:

- Bacillithiol, a thiol compound found in bacteria
- Bahrain Specialist Hospital, a hospital in Bahrain
- Bayley Seton Hospital on Staten Island, New York, US
- Belarusian Socialist Hramada, a political party
- Bishan MRT station, station abbreviation
- British Shorthair, a breed of cat
- British Society for Haematology
- BSh, Köppen climate classification for hot semi-arid climates
- BSH Bosch and Siemens Home Appliances
- Bushey railway station, station code
- Bushel, a unit of dry volume
- Federal Maritime and Hydrographic Agency of Germany (German: Bundesamt für Seeschifffahrt und Hydrographie)
- Bjerringbro-Silkeborg Håndbold, Danish handball club
