= GDSC =

GDSC may refer to:

- Genome Damage and Stability Centre, a Medical Research Council institute at the University of Sussex
- Government Data Standards Catalogue, a catalogue of UK Government data standards, part of e-GIF
- Gulf Diabetes Specialist Center, a medical center in Bahrain
