= International Hospital of Bahrain =

International Hospital of Bahrain W.L.L.
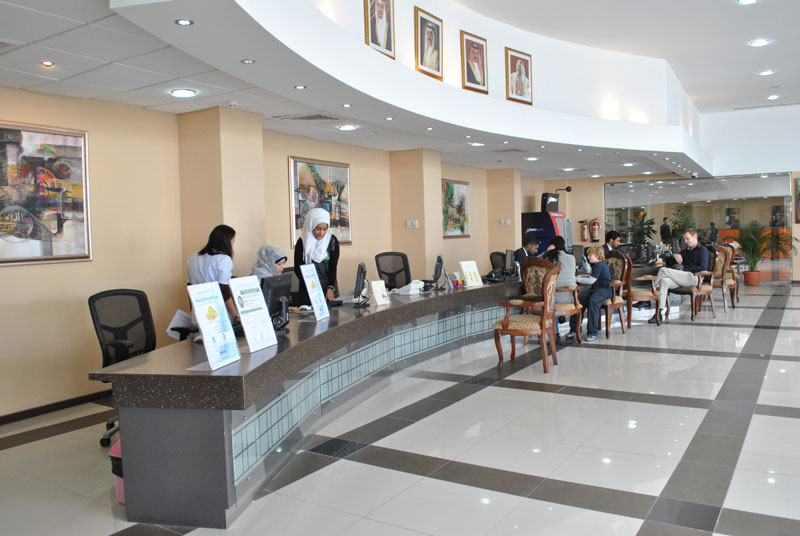
- IHB Main Reception

Geography
- Location: Jidhafs, Bahrain
- Coordinates: 26°13′9″N 50°31′35″E

Organisation
- Type: Private

Services
- Emergency department: 24-Hour Accident & Emergency

History
- Founded: October 1978
- Closed: 15 June 2018

Links
- Website: http://www.ihb.net

The International Hospital of Bahrain (Abbreviation: IHB; Arabic: مستشفى البحرين الدولي ) was a private hospital in the Kingdom of Bahrain.

Established in 1978 and located in Jidhafs, off the Budaiya highway, it was the second private medical center in the country after the American Mission Hospital. In 2014, a dispute emerged over unpaid wages to nurses and doctors after the hospital had an 80% decrease in patient visits. In 2017, an investigation into the hospital's financial records revealed "serious financial irregularities". In 2018, the National Health Regulatory Authority of Bahrain ordered the suspension of the hospital's services over "maintenance" issues highlighted in an inspection report. As of 2019, the pay dispute was not resolved despite court rulings in the staff's favour; dozens of nurses and doctors have since resigned from the hospital. Since its closure, the hospital's premises have been regularly burgled.

== History ==
The IHB started in the seventies in a small flat in the Salmaniya Highway. It was the first private clinic of Faysal Saeed Zeerah, Bahrain's first UK-qualified Bahraini Surgeon. Zeerah, along with Dr. Ali Fakhro, the first Minister of Health, was also instrumental in designing and building Salmaniya Medical Complex. Zeerah, however, foresaw the importance of private medicine and he strongly believed in starting it. Thus, he decided to branch out and build the first private hospital in the Kingdom. The International Hospital of Bahrain WLL was then formed in October 1978, as a modest clinic with very few beds and with Mr. Zeerah as its only doctor. Dr. Reginald Hutchings later on joined as Obstetrician and Gynaecologist. Gradually the services offered expanded: Physiotherapy, a small Laboratory and later on Radiology were added.

== Gallery ==
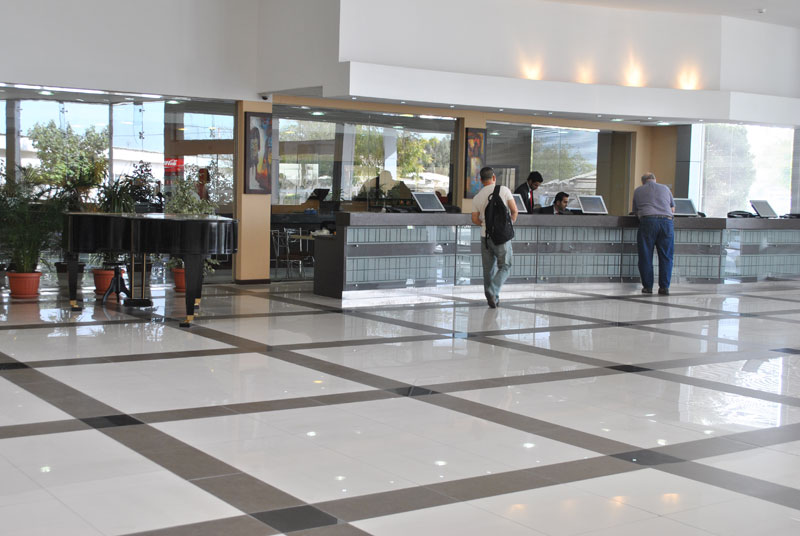
Main Reception

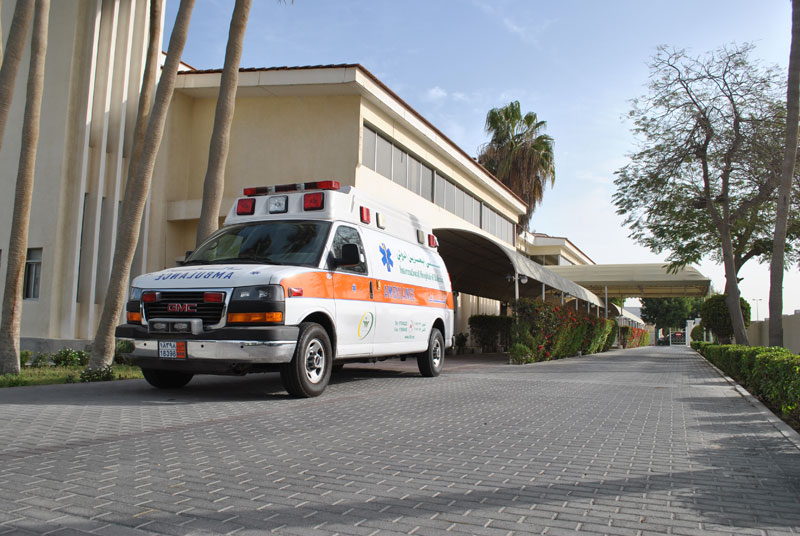
IHB 24/7 accident & emergency services

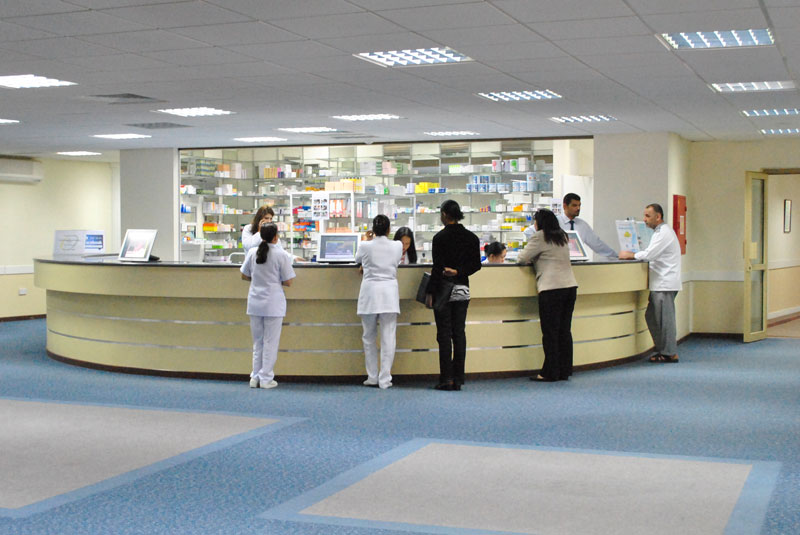
IHB Pharmacy
