= List of burn centres in Bahrain =

This is a list of burn centres in Bahrain. A burn centre or burn care facility is typically a hospital ward which specializes in the treatment of severe burn injuries.

In 1980, the need for a dedicated burns unit in Bahrain was highlighted in the local medical literature after significant incidents of burns, commonly scalding injuries in children, were identified.

== Hospitals ==
- Salmaniya Medical Complex – Bahrain's first burns unit was established in Salmaniya Medical Complex in 1984, relieving the burden on general surgical wards. A study in 1993 calculated more than 1600 admitted burns patients since its establishment, with over half belonging to the paediatric population and another significant portion being young migrant labourers.
- Bahrain Royal Medical Services
- KIMS Bahrain Medical Centre

== See also ==
- Health in Bahrain
