= Psychiatric Hospital (Bahrain) =

- Government Hospitals
- An inpatient building at the hospital

Geography
- Location: Salmaniya, Manama, Bahrain

Organisation
- Care system: Public
- Type: Teaching
- Affiliated university: Arabian Gulf University, RCSI Bahrain

Services
- Beds: 226

History
- Founded: 1932

Links
- Website: Psychiatric Hospital Official Webpage

The Psychiatric Hospital (Arabic: مستشفى الطب النفسي) of Bahrain is a 296-bed tertiary care public hospital located in Salmaniya, Manama, Bahrain. It is the country's only public psychiatric teaching hospital, dating back to 1932. The hospital boasts 241 beds, handles an average of 1,195 psychiatric inpatient admissions and 20,000 outpatients on a yearly basis.

== History ==
The establishment of a psychiatric facility in Bahrain dates back to 1930, when Charles Belgrave, the British advisor to the Bahraini hakim, proposed the establishment of an asylum under the direct control of the Manama municipality, for the safekeeping of "local lunatics." In 1932, a small house in Manama was rented out for that purpose, with a maximum capacity of 14 patients (12 male and 2 female). The facility was staffed by attendants who were primarily unskilled labourers working for the municipality with no healthcare qualifications.

Custodianship of the psychiatric hospital was transferred to the Department of Health in 1948. Dr. R.H.B. Snow, the State Medical Officer for the Government of Bahrain at the time, oversaw the refurbishment of the hospital; the facility was repainted, and for the first time, patients were encouraged to spend time outside their cells. In 1964, Dr. Butler, an English doctor, was credited with initiating regular psychiatric outpatient services, hiring qualified overseas psychiatric nurses (primarily from Lebanon and India), and introducing Chlorpromazine as the first psychiatric medication in use in the country.

The hospital itself underwent several expansion projects in the 1970s and 1980s; the child and adolescent psychiatric outpatient department was opened in 1975, an 88-bed unit for chronic patients. The community psychiatry department was established in 1979. A liaison psychiatry service was also established with Bahrain's main hospital, Salmaniya Medical Complex in 1979. In 1984, a new outpatient department was constructed, with teaching facilities, conference rooms, and administrative offices. In 1987, the Alcohol and Drug rehabilitation unit was established with an initial capacity of 17 beds.

In 2009, A study on clinicians based in the hospital revealed high rates of burnouts, particularly amongst mental health occupational therapy staff. In 2019, hospital underwent a beautification campaign wherein local artists were invited to paint murals and mosaics on the exterior walls of the hospital.

Psychiatric services were also incorporated within primary care health centres in Bahrain, with family physicians allowed to prescribe psychiatric medications; the first such initiative in the Arab world.

== Facilities ==
As of 2011, the psychiatric hospital hosts 296 beds across all its units, with most belonging to general psychiatry (114). This number later reduced to 241 in 2013 and 226 by 2017. The community and day centre department currently oversees treatment of the adult & elderly population in the country. Two specialised outpatient clinics for anxiety and intellectual disability have also been established. The hospital employs around 49 full-time psychiatrists and over 276 nurses & allied healthcare professionals.

== See also ==
- Healthcare in Bahrain
- List of hospitals in Bahrain
