= Healthcare in Bahrain =

Bahrain has a universal health care system, dating back to 1960. Government-provided health care is free to Bahraini citizens and subsidized for non-Bahrainis. Healthcare expenditure accounted for 4.5% of Bahrain's GDP, according to the World Health Organization. Bahraini physicians and nurses form a majority of the country's workforce in the health sector, unlike neighbouring Gulf states. Bahraini Doctors Day is commemorated on the first Wednesday of November annually.

== Health insurance ==
The Health Insurance Law, No. 23 of 2018 came into force on 1 December 2018. It establishes the National Health Regulatory Authority which will establish a dedicated health insurance fund coordinating with the Supreme Council of Health. The Fund is to be invested and will be run by an elected Board of Directors. Insurance contributions will be collected by healthcare providers. A Health Information and Knowledge Management Centre is to be established, which will collect, analyse and process health-related data using comprehensive electronic medical records for all beneficiaries. All nationals, residents and visitors will be required to pay for mandatory health insurance. Benefits are prescribed by the law. Employers must pay contributions for insurance of their foreign employees and in some cases their dependents. Bahraini nationals can access voluntary health insurance packages through the Fund which will meet 60% of the costs of private sector hospitals or facilities. Foreign visitors are covered for emergency healthcare, although the cost of visas will increase.

== History ==
The first hospital in Bahrain is the American Mission Hospital. It started in 1893 as a small dispensary but soon become a clinic. And then, with a proper building built, the Mason Memorial Hospital, was formally inaugurated on 26 January 1903. That was the original name until 1962, when the name formally became American Mission Hospital, as everyone was referring to it with this name

The second hospital to open in Bahrain, in 1937, was the Awali Hospital. It was built close to the Bahrain Petroleum Company (Bapco) refinery to help and support Bapco employees and their families with advanced medical care.

The first public hospital, and also tertiary hospital, to open in Bahrain was the Salmaniya Medical Complex, in the Salmaniya district of Manama, in 1957. The Psychiatric Hospital is the only such public hospital in the country. Private hospitals are also present throughout the country, such as the Bahrain Specialist Hospital and the now-defunct International Hospital of Bahrain.

The Bahrain Defence Force – Royal Medical Services (BDF-RMS) started in 1968 as a small clinic. But, the BDF-RMS grew from a small operation into a 120 bed hospital, when in formally opened on 5 February 1979.

The COVID-19 pandemic in Bahrain started in February 2020 with its first reported case. Over the following two years, Bahrain reported more than 696,000 confirmed cases and 1,548 fatalities from COVID-19. Its national response to the pandemic drew praise from the World Health Organization which launched a case study into the Kingdom's response.

== See also ==
- Health in Bahrain
- List of hospitals in Bahrain
- List of burn centres in Bahrain
