= American Mission Hospital =

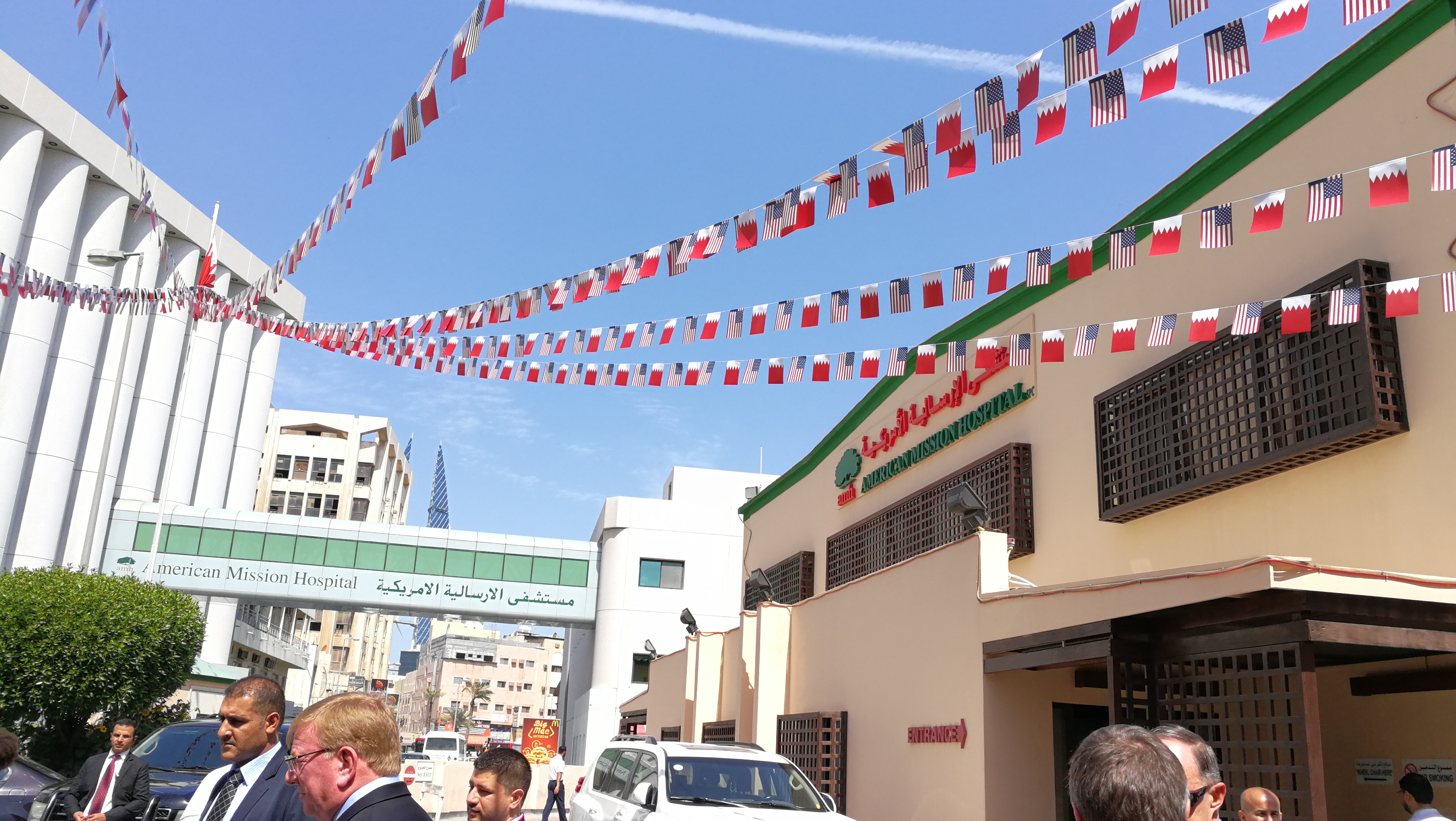

Geography
- Location: Manama, Bahrain
- Coordinates: 26.231735°N 50.582670°E

Organisation
- Care system: Private
- Type: Not-for-profit

Services
- Standards: ISO Certified, Diamond Accredited (NHRA), CAP Accredited

History
- Former names: Mason Memorial Hospital, Marion Wells Thoms Memorial Hospital
- Opened: 1903

Links
- Website: www.amh.org.bh
- Lists: Hospitals in Bahrain

The American Mission Hospital is a private not-for-profit hospital located in Manama, Bahrain.

Established in 1903, as the Mason Memorial Hospital, it was the first hospital established in Bahrain. The hospital offers medical, dental, and wellness services from its main branch in Manama. It also has branches and satellite clinics located at Saar, Amwaj Islands and Riffa.

The largest branch, King Hamad American Mission Hospital, was opened in A'Ali on 26 January 2023. It started receiving patients at the new branch in March 2023.

== History ==
The origins of the hospital can be traced back to 1889, when Arabian Mission, a Christian mission service organization, was established by graduating students of the New Brunswick Theological Seminary, which was run by the Dutch Reformed Church, in New Brunswick, New Jersey.

The articles of association were signed in New York in August 1889, and the organization began formally with eight trustees and two graduates missionaries, Samuel Zwemer and James Cantine.

These two founders of the Arabian Mission went through intensive Arabic language training in Beirut, Lebanon, during 1890–1892, before they embarked on their work. James Cantine went to Basrah in Mesopotamia, in August 1892, and immediately started building a school and a hospital there, while Zwemer traveled to Bahrain.

Zwemer landed on the shores of Bahrain on 7 December 1892 and started a medical dispensary. In 1895, during one of his periodic visits to Baghdad, he met an Australian missionary nurse, Amy Wilkes, and they soon got engaged. The following year, on 18 May 1896, they were married at the British consulate, in Baghdad, by one Rev. Canon Parfit.

After Zwemer came back to Bahrain with his bride, the now husband-wife team continued to run the clinic, dispensary, and bookshop, all from a rented house in Manama souq. Later, they moved to a mission house, from where they initiated some basic medical services. It was a precursor to the establishment of the hospital.

The first Western-trained resident doctors, Sharon J Thoms and Marion Wells Thoms, a husband-and-wife team, both medical graduates of the University of Michigan, arrived in 1900. And they - with the Zwemers - decided to find a place to build a hospital.

In 1901, the then Hakim of Bahrain Isa ibn Ali Al Khalifa helped them purchase land for the construction of a hospital complex to replace the mission house. Then, with sufficient donations from one Mason family in New York, the mission constructed the 24-bed Mason Memorial Hospital in 1902. It was officially opened on 26 January 1903.

Soon after the hospital opened, it began to attract thousands of patients from across the Gulf; from places like Qatif, al-Hasa, Oman, Qatar, Najd and Bushire.

Even though another hospital, in memory of Queen Victoria who died in 1901, was set up by the British in 1905, on the requests and donations of some Hindu merchants in Bahrain, it was not consistent in its functioning. The Victoria Memorial Hospital (Bahrain) was often short of staff and it is recorded that the patients were sent to the Mission Hospital.

By 1924, the mission hospital was having 33,000 outpatients and 600 inpatients a year, with an average of 100 patients being treated a day. Throughout the hospital's history, the majority of healthcare workers in the hospital were employed from Western countries or India although many Bahrainis were also recruited and trained in the medical sciences.

Mason Memorial Hospital building when it was nearing completion in late 1902. (From AMH Archives).

In 1927, seeing the growing need for a separate facility for women alone, and for children, the Arabian Mission raised funds and then, the Marion Wells Thoms Memorial Hospital for Women and Children was opened, in addition to the Mason Memorial Hospital. It was named after Dr Marion Wells Thoms, who had died of typhoid in 1905.

The King Hamad American Mission Hospital in A'ali, 2026.

In 1962, the hospital expanded by opening two new buildings in central Manama and renamed itself the 'American Mission Hospital' that same year. The expansion was opened by the Emir of Bahrain Isa bin Salman Al Khalifa. On the brink of closing in the 1980s, the hospital revamped its services by offering 24-hour services, opening new specialised ENT and orthopaedic clinics.

In 2000, the hospital opened its first satellite clinic in Saar, on the western side of Bahrain, offering dental and medical services. The same year, a bridge connecting two hospital buildings across the busy Isa Al Kabeer road in Manama was opened.

In 2014, another clinic was opened in Amwaj Islands, to the northeast of Manama. In March 2018, yet another clinic was opened in Riffa.

With growing demand in Saar, the hospital services are being offered, since 2016, from a larger purpose-renovated building in Saar, very close to the old location. In 2018, a new Zwemer Clinic was also opened, in the main Manama branch premises, on 5 March, to cater to those in the low income groups with financial needs.

The hospital's staff accommodation was also upgraded in 2019, when a new apartment complex was built for the staff.

In 2023, on January 26, the fifth and the largest facility, King Hamad American Mission Hospital, opened in A'Ali.

== Leaders ==
In the late 1890s, the sick and injured were being served from Samuel Zwemer's dispensary, and later, from the mission house where the Zwemers stayed. But, the need for a proper hospital with well-trained doctors was growing fast. And Zwemer's plea, to the Arabian Mission, for a full medical appointment, finally paid off at the end of the nineteenth century, with the arrival of Dr Sharon J Thoms, who became the hospital's first leader, or the Chief Medical Officer.

When Dr Sharon J Thoms arrived in Bahrain on September 11, 1900, no one could have been more relieved to see his new colleague "take up the medical work and make it worthy of that name" than Rev. Samuel Zwemer.

On the very first day of his arrival, Dr Sharon Thoms had to treat a pearl diver attacked by a shark. The patient was brought in with one of his arms very badly mangled, while the other was completely bitten off, below the elbow. That arm had to be amputated with anaesthetic administered, an advancement in medical technology which was very new to Bahrain then. And the cutting of bone, stitching of skin, and dressing of this man's stump, while men around him were fainting – as they saw the procedure – was Dr Thoms' official initiation into medical and surgical work in Bahrain.

It was something that Dr Thoms was completely unprepared for. But it was under his leadership that work began for the new hospital building, and the Mason Memorial Hospital opened two years later.

Referring to the incident, Dr Thoms had written: "The patient's father and brothers did not return from the pearl banks until several days afterward, and one morning they all came to the dispensary with the patient. The whole family showed signs of gratitude, but the father weeping covered my hands with kisses and my head with blessings" (Field Reports and Quarterly Letters from the Arabian Mission, July–Sep 1900, No.35, Page 6).

List of Chief Medical Officers / chief executive officers
S.No	Years served	Name	Term
1	1902–1909	Dr. Sharon J Thoms	–
2	1909–1912	Dr. C Stanley G Mylrea	–
3	1914–1922	Dr. Paul W. Harrison	First Term
4	1922–1936	Dr. Louis P Dame	–
5	1937–1941	Dr. W. Harold Storm	First Term
6	1941–1948	Dr. Paul W. Harrison	Second Term
7	1948–1964	Dr. W. Harold Storm	Second Term
8	1965–1966	Dr. Donald T Bosch	–
9	1967–1980	Dr. Alfred G Pennings	–
10	1980–1984	Dr. Jack W Hill	–
11	1984–1987	Dr. J Ted Herbelin	–
12	1988–2009	Dr. Paul Armerding	–
13	2009 –	Dr. George Cheriyan	–

Sources: AMH Archives, Changing Scenes book by Angela Clarke,.

The hospital has placed the pictures of all the past Chief Medical Officers, who served over the last hundred years, with their names and tenures, on a wall in its main Manama branch, near its ENT Department.

In 2017, as a part of its strategic development goals, the hospital's board of directors, representing the Reformed Church in America, reorganized senior leadership positions. The board named Dr George Cheriyan as the corporate CEO and member of the board of directors, and it named Julia Tovey as the group CEO, the first female to hold this leadership position in the hospital's almost 120-year history.

== Books ==
For nearly a century, much of what happened in the various stations of the Arabian Mission, including in the Bahrain station, was regularly and meticulously recorded. All the reports of missionaries are now available in the archives of the Reformed Church of America and in the volumes of Neglected Arabia 1902–1949 and Arabia Calling 1949–1962.

Some chief medical officers, doctors, and other staff have also written books on their experiences at the American Mission Hospital of Bahrain, and on other matters, of their personal interests. Some of those books are listed below.

1. History of the Arabian Mission by Alfred DeWitt and Mason and Frederick J. Barny, 1926, Board of Foreign Missions, Reformed Church of America, New York.
2. Doctor in Arabia by Paul W Harrison, MD, 1940, First edition, Van Rees Press, New York, ASIN B000PS29SI
3. Kuwait Before Oil: Memoirs of Dr. C. Stanley G. Mylrea, Contributors : C. Stanley G. Mylrea, Samuel Marinus Zwemer, Mrs. John Van Ess, Mrs. Abbe Livingston Warnshuis, of the Arabian Mission, Published in 1951.
4. A Tool in His Hand (Hardcover) by Ann M. Harrison, 1958, First Edition, Friendship Press, New York. ASIN : B000NXFAX6
5. My Arabian Days and Nights: A Medical Missionary in Old Kuwait by Dr Eleanor T. Calverley, MD, First Edition (Hardcover), 1958, Thomas Y Crowell Company, New York ASIN: B000J0XROW
6. A Life and Times ( Biography of William Harold Storm, MD) by Janet Mabel Storm Pengelley, 2005, First ed., Perth: Pengelly, ISBN 9780646451817
7. Doctors for the Kingdom by Paul L Armerding, 2003, (First ed.). Grand Rapids, Michigan: Wm B Eerdmans Publishing Co. ISBN 0802826830.
8. Transitions: In Mission, In Medicine, In Bahrain by Corrine Overkamp MD, FACP, First Edition, 2011, The archives of the Reformed Church of America – Missionary Resources, New Jersey. ISBN 9781105438820, ASIN B009AOKRNW
9. Seashells of Oman by Donald Bosch and Eloise Bosch. The husband and wife were also reputed conchologists who collected and catalogued seashells, and some shells or marine molluscs are named after them
10. Seashells of Eastern Arabia by Donald Bosch, R.G. Moolenbeek & P. Graham Oliver, edited by Peter Dance

== Departments ==
According to the hospital's website, it is currently offering its services through the following departments :

- Anaesthesia and OR
- Audiology
- Dental
- Dermatology
- Dietary Services
- ENT
- Family Medicine
- Gastroenterology
- General Practice
- Hydrotherapy
- Internal Medicine
- Laboratory
- Laser therapy
- Mental Health
- Obstetrics and Gynaecology
- Ophthalmology
- Orthopaedics
- Osteopathy
- Paediatrics
- Pharmacy
- Physiotherapy
- Plastic Surgery
- Pre-Employment Check*
- Pulmonology
- Radiology
- Speech Therapy
- Sports Medicine
- Surgery
- Urgent Care Unit
- Urology
- Vascular Medicine
- Zwemer Clinic**
1. **Zwemer Clinic in Manama is for the low-income workers. It is also the only place in Manama where Pre Employment Check is done.

== Awards ==
In May 2020, the hospital achieved first place in two categories of Business Worldwide Magazine (BWM) 2020 GCC Business Excellence Awards. Best Private Non-profit Healthcare Provider – GCC and 'Business Leadership and Outstanding Contribution to Healthcare – GCC', which was won by Group CEO Julia Maria Tovey.

Dr George Cheriyan, the corporate CEO of AMH, was listed among the winners in the CEO Today Middle East Awards of 2020 and 2021, by the CEO Today magazine.

In 2015, AMH was listed among the best hospitals in the Arabian Gulf region by the International Socrates Committee based in Oxford, England. That year, Dr George Cheriyan was also announced as the 'Manager of the Year' for the region.

On 10 August 2023, CMC Vellore invited Dr George Cheriyan, the CEO of AMH to give the 12th Annual Dr. Ida S. Scudder Humanitarian Oration, and presented him with a citation and award, for his work.

== Accreditations ==
In 2017, the main branch in Manama and the satellite branches in Saar and Amwaj Islands have been awarded Diamond status – the highest level of accreditation given to hospitals by the National Health Regulatory Authority (NHRA) of Bahrain. The accreditation is awarded, after NHRA's assessment, once, every three years.

The Diamond Status was re-affirmed in April 2021 when, once again, all the three locations were reviewed and re-accredited by NHRA.

In May 2021, the hospital became the first private hospital in Bahrain to achieve the CAP accreditation for its Department of Pathology and Laboratory Medicine, and second in the country to achieve this, after the government facility King Hamad University Hospital.

Ten years earlier, on 17 May 2007, AMH had become the first hospital in the Kingdom of Bahrain to have achieved accreditation through ACHS International (ACHSI), Australia's leading health care accreditation agency, which is recognised by the International Society for Quality in Health Care (ISQua), for both, its standards and its accreditations programs. And that status was reaffirmed in 2010.

The hospital currently has the certifications of and ISO 9001:2015 and ISO 45001:2018 for the Provision of In-patient and Out-patient Medical Services including Training, Dental, Diagnostic and Pharmacy Services from Bureau Veritas, UK. It had had the OHSAS 18001:2007 earlier

The hospital is also the authorized international training centre for the American Heart Association and conducts courses like Basic Life support (BLS), Advanced Cardiovascular Life Support (ACLS), Heart Saver and First Aid courses for healthcare workers as well as for all those interested.

== Community Outreach ==
The hospital's mission statement says that it provides healthcare "on the biblical principles of Love, Compassion and Grace".

Wherever required, with the permissions and support of the Ministry of Health, and Ministry of Labour and Social Development, the hospital collaborates with various social and philanthropic organizations to offer support to community on health related matters.

Many Bahraini as well as expatriate community groups and societies are given free health checks, educational talks and online discussions, and demonstrations, to spread health awareness. According to its corporate CEO Dr George Cheriyan, "Our community outreach programs are developed around the needs of the people in Bahrain. Care of the elderly, the special needs children, reaching out to labor camps are some of the activities we are involved in".

Several organizations support AMH's community outreach work, among the blind, among children with down syndrome and among social centres, as a part of the respective organizations' CSR initiatives. In association with Yousif & Aysha Almoayyed Charity, on 5 August 2018, the hospital held comprehensive medical check-up for children with Down Syndrome at the American Mission Hospital in Manama. In March 2022, it participated in the World Down Syndrome Day (WDSD) Walk for Fun event, organized in collaboration with OneHeartBahrain and Lulu Hypermarket.

Annual Interschool events like ‘Medathlon’, where quizzes, elocution contests, and short film making contests are held to promote medical science and health awareness among children and young people.

Asian School Bahrain won the AMH Health is Wealth Trophy in Medathlon 2019. And, in December 2020, the Indian School Bahrain has won the trophy in Med-athlon 2020, which was held on a virtual platform due to COVID-19 considerations.

AMH Medathlon 2022 "Health is Wealth" Trophy was won by the New Indian School, in December 2022.

Art Contests are also conducted on the same lines.

The hospital produces a Family Health magazine, 3 times a year, which is distributed freely, along with many booklets prepared by staff on health related matters.

== Island Classic Golf Tournament ==
AMH Island Classic Golf Tournament is an annual fixture in the sporting calendar of Bahrain, usually around October–November. It is held under the patronage of King Hamad bin Isa Al Khalifa, at his private golf course in Saffriya.

In 1997, the hospital's growth necessitated the construction of a new building and also an overhead bridge to connect the old building with the new one, across a busy street in Manama. To raise funds for their construction, the American Mission Hospital and the American Association of Bahrain decided to organize this annual golf tournament.

Every year, the funds raised through this event are used for the hospital expansion projects like new specialist clinics, for purchases of state-of-the-art medical and surgical equipment, and for community outreach programs which include free health camps, village health checks, and events that spread awareness related to health and medical issues.

During the championship's 10th anniversary in 2007, Paul Armerding, the then CMO and CEO had said, "The first Island Classic was held in February 1997. Receiving the patronage of the HH the late Amir, Shaikh Isa bin Salman Al Khalifa, was very significant. It was the royal imprimatur, a signal to the community that he gave credibility to our entire fund raising exercise".

The Island Classic golf tournament is played over the course of three days under the Florida scramble format. There are two flights: Championship and Premiership which allows various skill levels of golfers to participate.

Among those who had teed off on this golf course are world leaders like George Bush Sr. and Fidel Ramos, professional golfers like Scott McCaw and Chris Kelby and celebrity sportspersons like Boris Becker. In fact, Boris Becker, the tennis champion, had come to participate in the AMH Island classic in November 2007.

The 22nd AMH Island Classic charity golf tournament was held in 2019, and the 23rd AMH Island Classic which was scheduled to be held in November 2020 has been postponed due to the covid pandemic.

The 23rd Island Classic Golf Tournament was held during 27–29 October 2022. The first-place winners were the team from Riffa Views, while AMH Saar and Gulf Air came second and third.

== Wellness ==
AMH is among the first hospitals in Bahrain to focus on wellness and preventative health. The Riffa clinic, which opened in 2018, has a Wellness Centre, with a large portion of its facility allocated to health and fitness training. The trainers provide wellness advice, at this place which has a well-equipped gym, an indoor swimming pool, and other facilities. In A’Ali too, a new wellness centre with the latest state of the art equipment and facilities is also being built, at the King Hamad American Mission Hospital scheduled to open in 2022.

The tie-up with Soza Health, a health tech company from UK, from October 2020, showed AMH's willingness and readiness to promote preventative health strategies and lifestyle changes, in Bahrain. It was announced that these health assessments, backed by medical research, will show individuals where they stand on the wellness spectrum. It was expected to help people make important lifestyle modifications. However, the hospital announced that it ended its collaboration with Soza on 31 March 2022.

== Role in US-Bahrain Relations ==
The hospital has been a key link in Bahrain-US relations for about 120 years. In April 2018, addressing the American expatriate community in Bahrain, King Hamad bin Isa Al Khalifa had said:

"Over a century ago, an intrepid young American named Samuel Zwemer travelled from New Jersey to Arabia with a noble mission in his heart. The medical dispensary he opened in Manama became a hospital that has saved countless lives.

"This hospital is a testament to American generosity of spirit – and a reminder of what we have in common. Here in Bahrain we have a hospital founded by a Christian mission, alongside mosques and churches, synagogues and temples. In the USA people of all faiths come to live the American Dream. We may be different nations, but we are united by this proud tradition of tolerance. Together we share the dream of a world where we can all live alongside each other in peace and prosperity."

The then US Ambassador to Bahrain Justin Siberell had also said "The United States’ relationship with Bahrain is one of our oldest and closest in the region. It began more than a century ago, with the arrival of a group of remarkable and selfless individuals who founded the American Mission Hospital in Manama. Their example – of service, kindness and friendship – provides the foundation upon which we have built our close bond."

On 27 September 2016, in New York City, King Hamad bin Isa Al Khalifa was presented the Samuel Zwemer award by the Reformed Church of America (RCA), in recognition of his prominent support for the American Mission Hospital and for health services in general, in the Kingdom of Bahrain, as well as for the king's keenness to promote freedom of religion.

On behalf of the King of Bahrain, the then Minister of Foreign Affairs Shaikh Khalid bin Ahmed Al Khalifa had received the award from RCA's Secretary General Mr. Tom de Vries.

On 26 June 2019, when the King was being briefed about the hospital's expansion plans and its new building, coming up in A'ali, the king lauded AMH medical achievements over the past 120 years, and said,

"AMH throughout its history has played a key role in promoting the historic relations between the Kingdom of Bahrain and the United States of America".

AMH had also participated in "This is Bahrain" event held in Los Angeles in September 2017. It showcased the long history of Bahrain-US relationship through American Mission Hospital service for nearly 120 years by providing healthcare to the community of Bahrain.

The event in Los Angeles was organised under the patronage of King Hamad bin Isa Al Khalifa and was attended, on his behalf, by the King's representative for Charity Work and Youth Affairs Shaikh Nasser bin Hamad Al Khalifa. Shaikh Nasser unveiled the details of King Hamad Global Centre for Inter-faith Dialogue and peaceful Co-existence on the occasion.

On an earlier occasion too, on 9 September 2013, the king of Bahrain hailed the strong historic cooperation between Bahrain and the US, when he received the Chief Executive of the American Mission Hospital George Cheriyan and the hospital board members, at the Sakhir Palace.

With the US Naval Forces Central Command Fifth Fleet stationed in Bahrain, the hospital has been regularly visited by many US Ambassadors to Bahrain, Admirals and Vice Admirals. Several Americans, whether working for the Navy or in various other capacities in the country, often choose AMH for medical services.

== Future Plans ==
In October 2018, the hospital formally announced the construction of King Hamad American Mission Hospital (KHAMH) a new 100-bed multi-specialty hospital in A’Ali, in two phases. It is set to open in 2022. According to the hospital's corporate CEO, the new hospital is "a futuristic concept that will take us through the next 25 years. This is why we have introduced new ideas like a hybrid system – including medical robots and a helipad that we can rely on, as road traffic increases. The hospital will be full digitised and will also focus on providing medical intervention for people at home".

Also, this new BD25m (US$66.3m) hospital will be the first eco-friendly solar-run hospital in Bahrain, according to LaingBuisson, the official provider of independent sector healthcare market data to the UK Government's Office for National Statistics.

On 26 June 2019, King Hamad bin Isa Al Khalifa received the hospital leadership at his Qudaibiya Palace, in connection with this expansion project. And the king was briefed on the AMH future development programmes with a scale model and a photo album of the new AMH building structures.

In September 2021, Solar Quarter announced that 40% of the work on AMH's eco-friendly solar power-run private hospital in Bahrain is now complete.

In March 2022, Bahrain's Health Minister Faeqa bint Saeed Al Saleh received the American Mission Hospital (AMH) Corporate CEO and Chief Medical Officer Dr. George Cheriyan to review the developments of the new King Hamad-American Mission Hospital project in A’Ali.

On 30 March 2022, senior government officials paid a field visit to the site and were given an update on the progress. The Chairman of the Supreme Council of Health (SCH), Lieutenant General Dr. Shaikh Mohammed bin Abdullah Al Khalifa, the Minister of Health, Faeqa bint Said Al Saleh, and the Chief Executive of the National Health Regulatory Authority (NHRA), Dr. Meriam Al Jalahma, the Health Ministry Undersecretary Dr. Walid Al Mena, and SCH Secretary General Ibrahim Al Newakhdha were shown around by the hospital corporate CEO Dr George Cheriyan.

== See also ==
- Health in Bahrain
- Healthcare in Bahrain
- Ministry of Health (Bahrain)
- National Health Regulatory Authority
- List of hospitals in Bahrain
- Salmaniya Medical Complex
