= King Hamad University Hospital =

Hospital in Bahrain

Geography
- Location: Muharraq, Bahrain

Organisation
- Type: Teaching

Services
- Standards: JCI accreditation (2019)
- Beds: 410

Helipads
- Helipad: Yes

History
- Opened: 2012

Links
- Website: https://khuh.org.bh/
- Lists: Hospitals in Bahrain

King Hamad University Hospital (KHUH) is a hospital located in Muharraq, Bahrain. Officially opened on 6 February 2012 and situated in Busaiteen, the 64,000 square meter hospital includes the Bahrain Oncology Centre, which was inaugurated on 6 February 2019.

KHUH has a bed capacity of approximately 410 beds across nine wards, nine operating rooms, two adult intensive care units, a neonatal intensive care unit, and an emergency department. The hospital is part of the Bahrain Royal Medical Services. It also serves as the primary teaching hospital to RCSI Bahrain (a branch of the Royal College of Surgeons in Ireland), hosting medical and nursing students. Its emergency department is recognised as a training centre for Arab Board and Saudi Board emergency medicine residency programmes. The hospital has also received accreditation from the Joint Commission International (JCI).

== History ==
King Hamad University Hospital was established under Royal Decree No. 31 in 2010 as a hospital affiliated with the Bahrain Defence Force, and Bahrain's Royal Medical Services (RMS).

The hospital was developed as part of Bahrain's expansion of tertiary healthcare and medical education facilities. It was constructed in Busaiteen, Muharraq Governorate, adjacent to the campus of RCSI Bahrain which is a Bahrain medical university run by the Royal College of Surgeons in Ireland. The institution was designed to function both as a specialist referral hospital and as the principal teaching hospital for the university.

Planning of the hospital began during the late 2000s, with the project forming one of Bahrain's largest healthcare infrastructure developments. Construction began in 2007 and was undertaken by a joint venture between Nass Contracting and Burhan International Construction Company, under the supervision of Bahrain's Ministry of Works. KHUH officially opened on 6 February 2012.

In November 2019, KHUH completed an audit conducted by the Joint Commission International and received JCI accreditation.

In January 2025, the Bahrain Oncology Centre obtained National Diamond Accreditation from the National Health Regulatory Authority.

== Architecture ==
King Hamad University Hospital was designed as a complex of three interconnected four-storey clinical buildings arranged around landscaped courtyards. The buildings are linked by two enclosed skywalks running east to west, a layout intended to improve circulation between clinical departments while allowing natural daylight into patient areas.

The original hospital complex occupies approximately 64,000 square metres and was constructed on a site of approximately 22,500 square metres in Busaiteen. The campus includes teaching facilities, a multistorey carpark with 951 spaces, and a helicopter landing pad, providing direct access to the emergency department.

== Facilities ==
KHUH original services included six operating rooms, an adult intensive care unit, neonatal intensive care unit, emergency department, paediatric inpatient unit, internal medicine suites, and outpatient facilities and clinics.

The hospital was originally designed with approximately 312 inpatient beds. Clinical capacity subsequently expanded as additional specialist facilities were developed, such as the Bahrain Oncology Centre. The institution is the largest tertiary hospital in Bahrain.

Hospital specialties include neurosurgery, obstetrics and gynaecology, paediatrics, plastic surgery, emergency care, and oncology.

=== Bahrain Oncology Centre ===
The 120-bed Bahrain Oncology Centre (BOC) forms part of King Hamad University Hospital and was inaugurated on 6 February 2019. Designs were completed by HASSEL Architects, which received design approval in 2013.

The centre was developed to expand cancer diagnoses, treatment, and research in Bahrain, reducing the need for patients requiring advanced oncology treatment to travel abroad. It is a recognised and accredited centre for cell therapy services and bone marrow transplantation.

In March 2022, the Royal College of Surgeons in Ireland (RCSI Bahrain) officially inaugurated the Clinical and Biomolecular Research Centre. The centre was launched in partnership with KHUH and is housed within the BOC.

== Education and research ==
=== Royal College of Surgeons in Ireland (RCSI Bahrain) ===
The hospital serves as the principal teaching hospital to RCSI Bahrain (a branch of the Royal College of Surgeons in Ireland), hosting medical and nursing students.

In addition to undergraduate clinical eduation, the hospital supports postgraduate medical training, residency programmes and clinical research undertaken in collaboration with RCSI Bahrain.

=== Emergency medicine residency ===
KHUH is one of Bahrain's principal emergency medicine hospitals. A published overview of emergency medicine in Bahrain has identified its emergency department as a recognised training centre for Arab Board and Saudi Board emergency medicine residency programmes.

=== Digital healthcare technologies ===
The hospital has also been described in published research as an early adopter of digital healthcare technologies in Bahrain, including electronic health records, connected medical devices and remote patient monitoring.

== Recognition ==
KHUH has been ranked among university hospitals in the Brand Finance Global Top 250 Hospitals report. In 2023, it was raking 44th and in 2026, it was ranked in 73rd place.
