= Busaiteen =

Busaiteen البسيتين
- Town
- Etymology: From Arabic Basātīn (orchards); possibly Persian roots
- Interactive map of Busaiteen
- Location in Bahrain Busaiteen (Asia)
- Coordinates: 26.272°N 50.609°E
- Country: Bahrain
- Governorate: Muharraq Governorate
- Time zone: UTC+3 (AST)
- Area code: +973
- ISO 3166 code: BH-14

Busaiteen or Beseytin (Arabic: البسيتين) is a small town in northern Bahrain. It is located on Muharraq Island, just north of Muharraq City.

== Etymology ==
The town's name, "Busaiteen," is claimed to pertain to the large number of orchards (Basātīn بساتين in Arabic) found in it, however, just like other city names of Bahrain, it is possible that it has Persian roots, as it sounds (pronunciation wise) more like "Beseytin" a village in Khozestan, Iran.

== Education ==
Busaiteen is in close proximity to the first public school established in Bahrain, the Al-Hidaya Al-Khalifia School. It is also the site of RCSI Bahrain, a private medical school which is a fully owned constituent university of RCSI. Its campus opened in 2008 and it is affiliated with the King Hamad University Hospital, established by a royal decree in 2010.It has also Shaikh Khalifa Bin Salman Al-Khalifa Institute of Technology.

The Ministry of Education operates area schools. Boys schools in Busaiteen include Al-Busaiteen Primary Boys School, Al-Hidaya Al-Khalifa Secondary Boys School, and Al-Muharraq Technical Secondary Boys School. Girls schools in Busaiteen include Al-Busaiteen Primary Girls School and Al-Busaiteen Intermediate Girls School.

The French School of Bahrain is located in Busaiteen.

== Economy ==
Historically, inhabitants were primarily involved in pearl diving and fishing before the discovery of oil. Al Sayah Island used to lie off the coast of Busaiteen but has since been enveloped by land reclamation in the 2010s.

== Sport ==
The town has 2 sport clubs:

- Bahrain Sport Club
- Busaiteen Sport Club

== Notable people ==
- Turki al-Binali, a Sunni Islamic scholar.

== See also ==
- Al Hasan Mosque - a large mosque in the area.
