= Faeqa bint Saeed Al Saleh =

- فائقة بنت سعيد الصالح
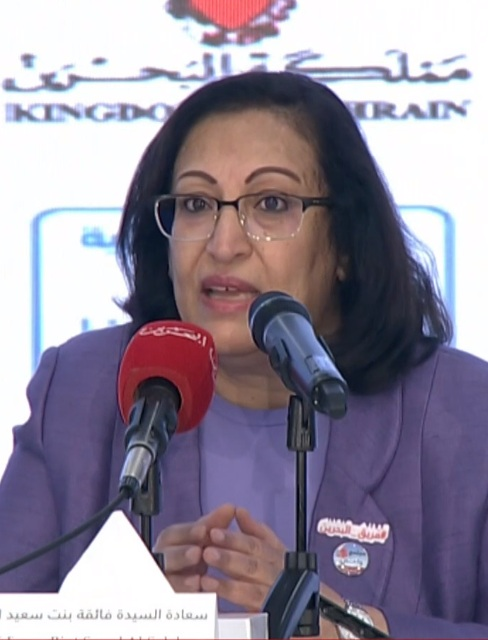
- Faeqa in 2020

Minister of Health
- In office 2015 – 13 June 2022
- Monarch: Hamad bin Isa Al Khalifa
- Prime Minister: Khalifa bin Salman Al Khalifa; Salman bin Hamad Al Khalifa
- Succeeded by: Jaleela bint Sayed Jawad Hassan

Personal details
- Education: University of London

Faeqa bint Saeed Al Saleh (Note: Arabic: فائقة بنت سعيد الصالح) is a Bahraini politician and a former government minister of health in Bahrain.

== Biography ==
Faeqa graduated from the University of London with an M. A. in Library and Information Studies. She served as the Assistant Secretary General of the League of Arab States'Head of Social Affairs Sector. Faeqa served as Minister of Social Development from December 2014 till she was appointed the Minister of Health in Bahrain in October 2015. The Forbes Middle East placed her 9th on a list of most powerful Arab women in governments. She is the only women in the Cabinet of Bahrain. In December 2015 she presided over celebration of Bahraini Women's day in the Ministry of Health, where she promised her support to female cadres and their allies in the ministry. Under her, the Ministry of health and the Ministry of Foreign Affairs collaborated to establish King Hamad Nursing and Associated Medical Sciences University in Pakistan. She inaugurated the first hotel clinic in Bahrain in Four Seasons Hotel.
