= Salmaniya Medical Complex =

- Salmaniya Medical Complex alongside Arabian Gulf University.

Geography
- Location: Salmaniya, Manama, BH

Organisation
- Care system: Public
- Type: Tertiary
- Affiliated university: Arabian Gulf University, RCSI Bahrain

Services
- Beds: 1200

Helipads
- Helipad: Yes

History
- Opened: 1959

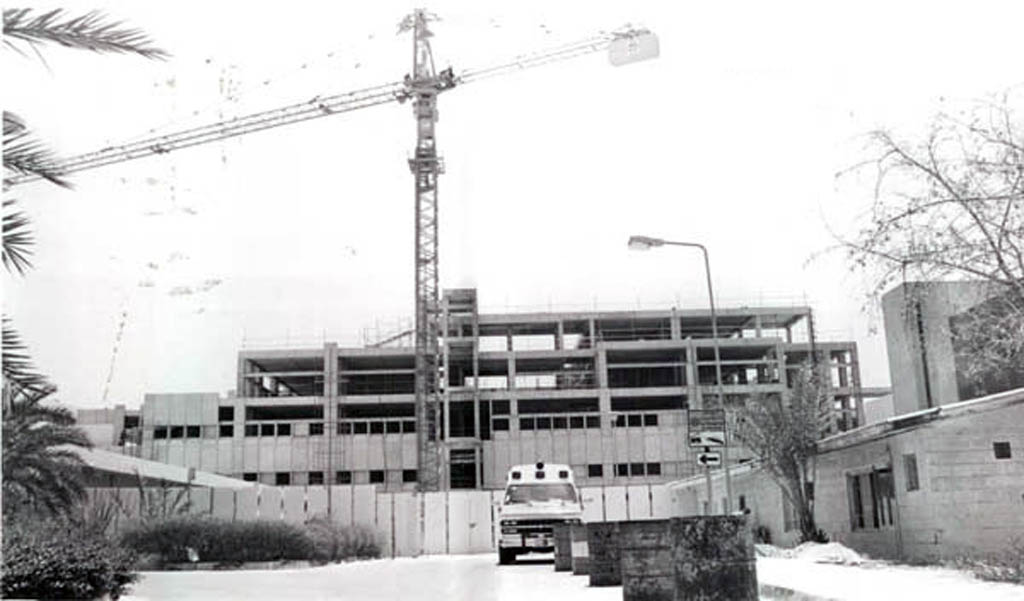
Construction of the Salmaniya Medical Complex.

Salmaniya Medical Complex (Arabic: مجمع السلمانية الطبي) is a public hospital situated in the Salmaniya district of Manama in the Kingdom of Bahrain. Established in 1957 and having a bed capacity of approximately 1,200 beds, it is the largest tertiary hospital in the country. The hospital provides secondary, tertiary, and emergency healthcare services as well as specialised outpatient clinics for the general public. Residency programs in the hospital are either Arab Board or Saudi Board certified.

The hospital receives an average of 900 to 1,000 patients a day and employs more than 2,000 physicians, nurses and workers. Bahrain's main morgue is situated in the complex. Salmaniya's emergency department receives more than 300,000 patients per year. The emergency department follows the Manchester Triage System and is Arab Board certified, amongst other residency programs.

== History ==
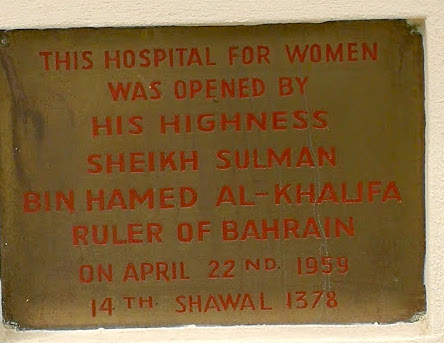
Dedication plaque of Salmaniya Medical Complex

Healthcare in Bahrain during the first half of the 20th century was predominantly supplied by the private American Mission Hospital, the small government hospital at Noaim (currently Noaim health centre) and Awali hospital. To cope with a largely increasing population, Salmaniya Medical Complex was opened in 1957 with a total capacity of 50 beds. The hospital underwent numerous expansions throughout its history; in 1977, the Emir of Bahrain Isa bin Salman Al Khalifa opened the first major expansion of the complex, which consisted of several new buildings which increased the hospital's total capacity to 470 beds. Further expansion in 1987 increased the total bed count to 617 beds. In 1997, a large expansion of Salmaniya was opened and included 20 new wards, which increased the total bed count to 926 beds. In 2014, a 90-bed unit dedicated to hereditary blood disorders including Sickle Cell Disease was established. During the midst of the 2020 COVID-19 pandemic in Bahrain, a 100-bed expansion of the emergency department was opened at the cost of 120,000 BHD.

=== Role in the Bahraini uprising ===
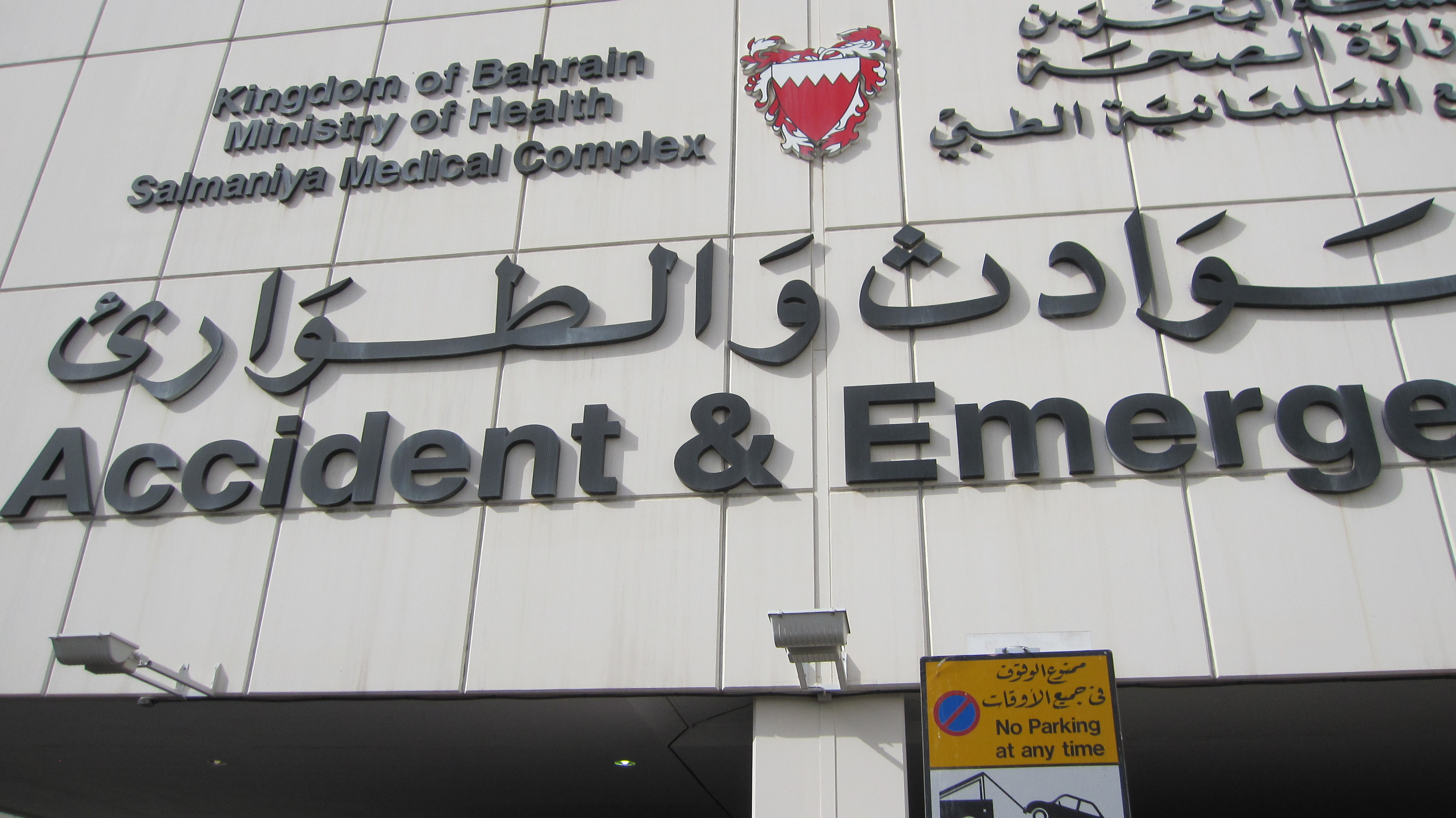
The entrance to the Accident and Emergency department.

Beginning in February 2011, Bahrain saw sustained pro-democracy protests, centered at Pearl Roundabout in the capital of Manama, as part of the wider Arab Spring. Authorities responded with a night raid on 17 February (later referred to by protesters as Bloody Thursday), which left four protesters dead and more than 300 injured.

At Salmaniya Medical Complex, doctors joined the protests themselves, speaking to protesters and media from the hospital stairs, after authorities blocked ambulances from bringing injured protesters there for care. The military responded by naming the hospital an opposition stronghold, taking it over and occupying it with masked personnel on 16 March. Military personnel used hospital records to find patients who had been active in the protests, identifying them in many cases by wounds from the birdshot fired by security forces into crowds. According to Human Rights Watch, these patients were then segregated, interrogated, and in many cases, beaten in their hospital beds by masked security agents.

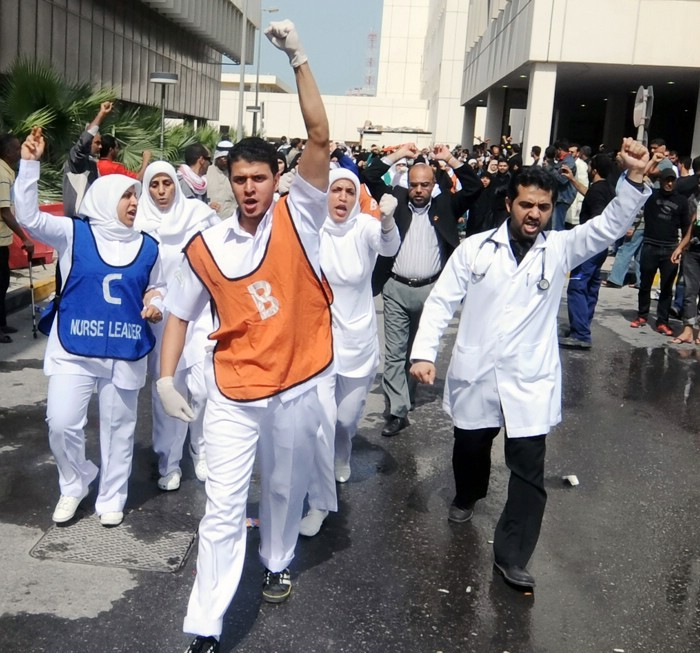
Health workers protest near Salmaniya Medical Complex following reports that paramedic crews and doctors were attacked in the 17 February raid at Pearl Roundabout.

In March and April 2011, twenty health workers, primarily from Salminya, were arrested on a variety of felony charges for their actions during the protests, while an additional twenty-eight were arrested for misdemeanors. Dr. Ali Al-Ekri was arrested while performing surgery at Salmaniya Medical Complex.

Charges against the doctors included "occupying a hospital, stockpiling weapons, spreading lies and false news, inciting hatred of Bahrain's rulers and calling for their overthrow, and withholding treatment of Sunnis". The government additionally alleged that blood from hospital blood banks had been used to exaggerate wounds, that health workers had transported weapons to the protesters by ambulance, and that AK-47s had been confiscated inside the hospital on a police raid. State media described the defendants as having "a terrorist aim". According to the prosecutor's case, al-Ekri had acted as the group's ringleader, organizing staff at Salmaniya to oppose the Bahraini government. The defendants denied all charges and maintained that the accusations were politically motivated. In a joint statement, they held that "our only crime was that during the unrest earlier this year, we were outspoken witnesses to the bloodshed and the brutal treatment by the security forces."

In September 2011, twenty of the health workers were convicted by a military court on felonies including "stockpiling weapons" and "plotting to overthrow the government". The remaining twenty-eight were charged with misdemeanors and tried separately. The following month, the sentences were overturned, and it was announced that the defendants would be retried by a civilian court. Retrials began in March 2012, but were postponed until June 14.

The case has drawn international attention, with organizations including the U.S. State Department, the United Nations, the World Medical Association, the British Medical Association, Doctors Without Borders, the International Council of Nurses, Amnesty International, Human Rights Watch, and Freedom House expressing their concern over the health workers' military trials and sentences. An independent commission organized by the king of Bahrain concluded in November 2011 that many of the detained health workers had been subject to torture and abuse while in police detention.

== See also ==
- College of Health Sciences, Bahrain
- List of hospitals in Bahrain
- Psychiatric Hospital (Bahrain)
