= Victoria Memorial Hospital (Bahrain) =

Victoria Memorial Hospital - Bahrain

Geography
- Location: Manama, Bahrain

Organisation
- Type: Semi-Government

History
- Opened: 1905
- Closed: 1948

Links
- Lists: Hospitals in Bahrain

Victoria Memorial Hospital was a hospital that existed in Manama, Bahrain from 1905 to 1948.

== Background ==
In November 1901, once the official period of mourning for Queen Victoria had passed, Gangaram Tikamdas and some other leading British Indian merchants of Bahrain offered 5000 rupees for the erection of a hospital to ‘perpetuate the memory of her late Majesty’. Gangaram Tikamdas was the first Thattai Bhatia to come to Bahrain in the early 1900s.

These traders expressed their willingness to donate in appreciation of "the blessings of free trade and peace they had enjoyed under British protection during the reign of the Queen".

The then Government of India, which was British, acknowledged the merchants’ ‘loyalty and public spirit’ but were reluctant to support such a financially costly scheme unless some ‘political advantage’ would arise from it. The Political Agent at Bahrain, John Calcott Gaskin, managed to persuade his superiors that the hospital's construction would be highly appreciated by the ‘natives’. Also, it was assumed that this will divert the sick from American missionary doctors operating in the Persian Gulf, and particularly in Bahrain at the Mason Memorial Hospital, thus bringing the inhabitants of Bahrain, and also the mainland of Eastern Arabia, under British influence. ‘For this reason principally’, he wrote, ‘the matter should be given favourable consideration by Government’.

Most of the construction costs were met by subscriptions from among the Hindu community of Bahrain, as well as leading Arab and Persian merchants. Popular contributors were Haji Muqbil al-Dhukayr and Abd al-Nabi Kazruni., but the Government of India undertook to finance the future maintenance of the hospital.

== Opening ==
In 1905, the Victoria Memorial Hospital, as it was named, opened its doors to public.

According to the book Histories of City and State in the Persian Gulf: Manama Since 1800 by Nelida Fuccaro, the hospital had been quickly constructed in 1904.

"The first modern medical facilities were established at the beginning of the twentieth century by the American missionaries and then by the British agency which had subsidized the construction of the Victoria Memorial Hospital in 1904. The government-built al-Na’im and al-Salmaniyya hospitals were added, in the outskirts of the town, in 1937 and 1959 respectively".

== Functioning ==
The hospital seems to have functioned with the primary motive of "political influence" and not really for the benefit of public health. It was mostly short of funds. Emily Overend Lorimer, wife of the Political Agent at Bahrain (1911-1912), wrote in a letter home, to her mother, that the Victoria Memorial Hospital was built without proper consideration of the costs. It was, she wrote, a ‘fine large hospital’ but with insufficient income. ‘When really bad cases come’, she noted, ‘we have to ask the Mission Hospital to take them in’.

It is also probable that the focus of the then British Government of India was not on this region, but more on the Indian subcontinent, as the Independence movement was growing there, which eventually saw Britain hand-over total control to the Indians on 15 August 1947.

== Closure ==
In a letter dated 19 June 1948, the Chief Quarantine Medical Officer of Bahrain has written a memorandum saying that the hospital will be closed to public.

"With effect from 1 July 1948, Victoria Memorial Hospital will be closed to the general public"

It was demolished in 1953, as per a record in theTreasure Minute Dated 21 March 1957 Concerning a Gift of Land in Bahrein published by Her Majesty's Stationery Office, London in 1957 :

Parliamentary minutes regarding the sale of a vacant site of some 4/5ths of an acre in the Manama district of Bahrain, originally acquired in 1903 for the erection of the Victoria Memorial Hospital which was demolished in 1953, to the Ruler of Bahrain, H.H. Sheikh Salman ibn Hamad Al Khalifa, who wished to found a Museum and Public Library on the site. The value of the site was estimated at about 70,000 pounds sterling. With stamp of "The Law Society, London" (29 March 1957).

From almost five decades, until the establishment of Naim hospital in the late 1940s, the Mission Hospital and Marion Wells Thoms Memorial Hospital, with Victoria Memorial Hospital, were the only modern healthcare facilities available in the country.
