= RCSI Graduate School of Healthcare Management =

Not-for-profit school of medical education based in Dublin, Ireland

- Type: Private, non-profit
- Parent institution: RCSI University of Medicine and Health Sciences
- Affiliations: NUI
- Location: 118 St Stephen's Green, Dublin, Ireland; 53°20′18″N 6°15′44″W
- Website: www.rcsi.com/gsm
- Location in Dublin

RCSI Graduate School of Healthcare Management (GSM) is a school of healthcare management and medical education at the RCSI University of Medicine and Health Sciences based in Dublin, Ireland.

== History ==
GSM was established in 2021 as the successor to RCSI's Institute of Leadership (founded 2005) and delivers postgraduate courses, undertakes healthcare-sector research, and offers continuing professional education CPD programmes.

Its postgraduate programmes are delivered fully online. In December 2025 the school moved in to new headquarters at RCSI's 118 St Stephen's Green building on the university's Dublin campus. It is a member of the university's Faculty of Medicine and Health Sciences.

== International operations ==
The Graduate School of Healthcare Management has in-person operations in Dublin, Dubai, Saudi Arabia and Bahrain, and as of 2026 has over 3,500 graduates in more than 30 countries.

GSM postgraduate programmes are accredited by Ireland's largest and oldest University, the National University of Ireland. With significant operations in the Gulf Cooperation Council region, the university is listed as a recognised institution for online study by Qatar and Bahrain, and graduates have also successfully obtained degree recognition in the United Arab Emirates and Saudi Arabia.

== Postgraduate programmes ==
As of 2026, the school offers the following postgraduate courses at Level 9 of the Irish National Framework of Qualifications (NFQ):

- MSc in Healthcare Management
- MSc in Leadership and Innovation in Healthcare
- MSc in Quality and Safety in Healthcare Management
- ProfDip in Clinical Leadership
- ProfDip in Leading Digital Health Transformation
- ProfCert in Innovation in Healthcare

It also offers a suite of shorter micro-credential modules from the above programmes, and a portfolio of CPD courses including a free-to-access AI in Healthcare course launched in September 2025.

== Research ==
Research areas include:

- Change and Innovation
- Healthcare Management
- Informatics
- Medical education
- Patient Safety & Quality
