= CPD =

CPD or cpd may refer to:

== Organizations ==
- Centre for Policy Development, an Australian think tank
- Centre for Policy Dialogue, Bangladesh
- Centres of Plant Diversity, an international classification initiative
- Commission on Presidential Debates, an American nonprofit
- Committee on the Present Danger, an American foreign policy interest group

=== Police ===
- Cambridge Police Department (Massachusetts)
- Camden Police Department (New Jersey), a defunct police department dissolved in 2012
- Carmel Police Department (Indiana)
- Charleston Police Department (West Virginia)
- Chattanooga Police Department, Tennessee
- Chicago Police Department, Illinois
- Cincinnati Police Department, Ohio
- Cleveland Police Department, Ohio
- Columbus Police Department, Ohio
- Town of Carmel Police Department (New York)

== Science and technology ==
- CPD (gene), a human gene encoding the protein Carboxypeptidase D
- Canonical polyadic decomposition, in mathematics
- Cephalopelvic disproportion, when the capacity of the pelvis is inadequate to allow the fetus to negotiate the birth canal
- Chronic pulmonary disease, a pathological condition
- Conditional probability distribution, a kind of distribution in statistics
- Copy/Paste Detector, software to find duplicate computer code
- Cyclobutane pyrimidine dimer, a common UV product
- Cyclopentadiene, an organic compound
- Cyproterone acetate, a progestin and antiandrogen

== Other uses ==
- Camperdown railway station, Australia
- Carnet de Passages en Douane, a customs document
- Collaborative product development, in business
- Constitutional Practice and Discipline, a publication of the Methodist Church of Great Britain
- Construction Products Directive, a repealed EU Directive
- Continuing professional development
- Danio margaritatus (also known as the Celestial Pearl Danio), a fish native to Southeast Asia
- Coober Pedy Airport, IATA code
- Crush protection device

== See also ==
- Congress of People's Deputies (disambiguation)
