= Jaleela bint Sayed Jawad Hassan =

Politician in Bahrain

Minister of Health
- Incumbent
- Assumed office 13 June 2022
- Monarch: Hamad bin Isa Al Khalifa
- Prime Minister: Salman bin Hamad Al Khalifa
- Preceded by: Faeqa bint Saeed Al Saleh

Personal details
- Education: King Faisal University

Jaleela bint Sayed Jawad Hassan is the Minister of Health for the Kingdom of Bahrain since 13 June 2022.

Prior to this role, she was the Chief Executive Officer of Primary Healthcare Centres. And for twelve years prior to the CEO's role, she was a Public Health Consultant which included a time as the Acting Head of Immunization Group in Disease Control Section of the Ministry of Health, Bahrain.

== Education ==
After her Bachelor's Degree in Medicine & Surgery (M.B.B.S) in 2000, from King Faisal University in Saudi Arabia, she earned her Licensure from the Ministry of Health, after Bahrain Medical Licensure Examination.

== Role as the Minister ==
In May 2023, the World Health Assembly (WHA), the decision-making body of WHO, elected Dr. Jaleela as the Chair of the WHA Main Committee (A), which deals with key technical issues, such as health systems and comprehensive health coverage. and emergency preparedness and response.
