= Gulf Diabetes Specialist Center =

Medical center in Manama, Bahrain

- Founded: 2004
- Location: Kingdom of Bahrain
- Chairman: Nedhal Saleh Al Aujan
- Website: Gulf Diabetes Specialist Center

Gulf Diabetes Specialist Center is a medical center located in Manama, Kingdom of Bahrain. It is primarily devoted to the treatment of diabetes and its related complications. It is an outpatient medical center that provides diabetes prevention programs and education and treatment for people with diabetes and their families. The facilities cover a range of functions including the management and treatment of adult and pediatric diabetes and metabolic disorders. The center was opened under the patronage of the Bahraini prime minister Khalifa Bin Salman Al Khalifa.

According to the medical director of GDSC, Bahrain's diabetes rate dropped in the year 2011 to 19.9%

== Specialties ==
- Diabetes, Endocrinology and Osteoporosis,
- Neurology
- Internal Medicine
- Family Medicine

== Scope of care ==
- Adult Diabetes and Endocrine Disorders
- Gestational Diabetes
- Hypothyroidism and Hyperthyroidism/Graves’ disease
- Thyroid gland nodules and malignancy
- Parathyroid disorders
- Pituitary gland disorders and pituitary tumors
- Calcium disorders
- Osteoporosis and Osteopenia
- Foot Care
- Vitamins deficiency
- Lipids disorders
- Hypertension
- Obesity and weight disorders
- Hypogonadism and Gynecomastia
- Polyendocrine metabolic ovarian syndrome (PMOS)
- Hirsutism
- Adrenal Glands disorders and tumors
- Sexual Dysfunction

== Special facilities ==
- Radiology and Bone Densitometry
- Laboratory
- Podiatry
- Pharmacy
- Diabetes Education
- Exercise Physiology (Gymnasium)

== See also ==
- List of hospitals in Bahrain
