= Beseytin =

Beseytin بسيطين
- Village
- Location within Iran
- Coordinates: 31°18′51″N 49°23′22″E
- Country: Iran
- Province: Khuzestan
- County: Ramhormoz
- Bakhsh: Central
- Rural District: Howmeh-ye Gharbi

Population (2006)
  - Total: 58
- Time zone: UTC+3:30 (IRST)
  - Summer (DST): UTC+4:30 (IRDT)

Beseytin (Persian: بسيطين, also Romanized as Beseytīn, Beseyteyn, and Baseytīn; also known as Basetīn) is a village in Howmeh-ye Gharbi Rural District, in the Central District of Ramhormoz County, Khuzestan Province, Iran. At the 2006 census, its population was 58, in 9 families.
