= RCSI Medical University of Bahrain =

Medical college

- Logo of the Royal College of Surgeons in Ireland
- Motto: Consilio Manuque
- Motto in English: Scholarship and Dexterity
- Type: Private
- Established: 2004
- Endowment: US$65 million
- President: Sameer Otoom (President)
- Academic staff: 150 (2015)
- Administrative staff: 70 (2012)
- Students: 1,302 (2015)
- Undergraduates: 992 (2012)
- Postgraduates: 36 (2012)
- Location: Busaiteen, Bahrain; 26.2618°N 50.5970°E
- Campus: Urban
- Website: www.rcsi-mub.com

The RCSI Medical University of Bahrain, also known as RCSI Bahrain, is a constituent medical school of the Royal College of Surgeons in Ireland located in Busaiteen, Bahrain. It was established in 2004. Like its Dublin counterpart situated on St. Stephen's Green, RCSI Bahrain is a not-for-profit health sciences institution focused on education and research. The university incorporates schools of medicine, nursing, and postgraduate studies and research, and thus provides both undergraduate and postgraduate levels of education and research activities in a number of healthcare fields.

== History ==
RCSI was founded in 1784 by royal charter of King George III of Great Britain and Ireland. The college was established to educate surgeons as surgeons were trained separately from physicians. A supplemental charter was granted by Queen Victoria in 1844, dividing medical graduates into Licentiates and Fellows. In 1886, the training of physicians and surgeons merged, and the college established a Medical School.

The relations between RCSI and Bahrain date back to the 1970s in the form of first aid training courses and setting examinations. The establishment of the university in Bahrain was part of a greater €60−70 million 10−year development plan, which was officially launched in September 2003. RCSI believes its “collaborations across the globe” fulfill its 200-year mission of “teaching, discovery and engagement.”

The university was formally opened on 4 May 2004 by the Prime Minister of Bahrain, Khalifa bin Salman Al Khalifa and Ireland's Prime Minister, Bertie Ahern, with the first batch of medical students being admitted in October of the same year. In 2006, the college opened its doors for nursing students and established the School of Postgraduate Studies. Soon after, the campus moved from the Seef district of Manama to its current 15,750m^{2} campus in Busaiteen.

=== College crest ===
The arms of the college is an eagle, preying on a serpent which is an emblem of disease. The supporters are Irish elks, with chaplets of shamrocks around their necks. Over the helmet is conventional drapery, called the Mantling, and derived from a head-covering worn by knights in armour for protection against the sun's heat. The shield is decorated with two fleams of lancets, a satire cross, a hand and a crowned harp; the latter was taken from Arms granted in 1645 to the Dublin Guild of Barber-Surgeons. The motto Consilio Manuque denotes the wisdom and manual skill required of a surgeon.

== Academics ==
=== Rankings ===
RCSI-Bahrain has been placed 1st in a list of private higher education institutions within the country in the Higher Education Council's (HEC) 2015 Annual Report. The report, which focused on the theme of ‘Achievements and Developments’, features evaluations of all institutions based on the strategies and approaches of managing and developing higher education.

Globally, the Royal College of Surgeons in Ireland was placed top 50 in the latest Times Higher Education World University Rankings. The Times Higher Education World University Rankings lists the best global universities and are the only international university performance tables that judge world-class universities across all their core missions—teaching, research, knowledge transfer and international outlook. There are 17,000 RCSI alumni working as medical doctors or in allied disciplines around the world.

=== Degrees offered ===
The university offers the following programs: School of Medicine, School of Nursing & Midwifery, and School of Postgraduate Studies. Graduates from the School of Medicine are conferred with the degrees of MB, BCh, BAO Degree (Bachelor of Medicine, Bachelor of Surgery degree and Bachelor of the Art of Obstetrics) from both the National University of Ireland (NUI) and RCSI-Bahrain. In countries that follow the tradition of the United States, the equivalent medical degree is awarded as Doctor of Medicine (MD). Medical graduates are also awarded with the Licentiate of the Royal College of Surgeons in Ireland (LRCSI) and the Licentiate of the Royal College of Physicians of Ireland (LRCPI). Graduates of the nursing course obtain a Bachelor of Science in Nursing from the RCSI-Bahrain and from the NUI as well. Masters Programmes in Healthcare Management and Quality & Safety in Healthcare Management are offered. The programmes offer a wide range of leadership development encompassing education, competencies and development for healthcare and management staff focusing on core components of leadership, management and quality & safety in healthcare management. The medical program is accredited by the Irish Medical Council based upon the World Federation of Medical Education (WFME) standards, which are the highest standards available in medical education, by the GCC Medical Schools Deans’ Committee, and is included in the World Health Organisation's Directory of Medical Schools and the International Medical Education Directory of the Foundation for Advancement of International Medical Education and Research (FAIMER).

== Campus ==
RCSI is organized into campuses in St. Stephen's Green in Dublin and in Bahrain. The campuses run their medical programs in parallel. RCSI-Bahrain, a National University of Ireland, is top ranked of the medical schools located in Bahrain. RCSI-Bahrain has one of two nursing programmes in the country, the other being College of Health Sciences.

Institution wide staff-student ratio is 1:19.4. Most of the senior medical teaching faculty members are from Ireland. As of 2015, the student body was estimated at 1,302, the majority of which were in the School of Medicine. Students belonged to more than 39 different nationalities. RCSI-Bahrain medical school shares the same curriculum and examinations with RCSI, Dublin. The Mobility Programme allows them to study in the alternate RCSI facility for a selected period (i.e. the RCSI student in Bahrain can exchange to Dublin and vice versa).

RCSI-Bahrain's main teaching hospitals are the BDF Hospital, King Hamad University Hospital, Salmaniya Medical Complex, and a number of healthcare centers. The campus, located next to the newly constructed King Hamad University Hospital, can accommodate up to 2,000 students. The campus is composed of a six-story building and a $700,000-investment, 900m^{2} sports facility . The total investment in the campus is estimated at $65 US million.

RCSI-Bahrain's architecture was designed by UK-based architect Aedas and Bahrain-based consultancy Mohammed Salahuddin. The theme is said to rely heavily on what is widely regarded as Ireland's greatest national monument, Newgrange, one of the finest examples in western Europe of the type of tomb known as a passage grave which can be dated to around 3200BC built by Stone Age farmers. Older than Stonehenge and the Great Pyramids of Giza, this World Heritage Site and this campus have many similarities including symbology and round shape. The atrium meanwhile, fills with light, much like the sun filling the passageways of Newgrange on Winter Solstice – the shortest day of the year. Celtic and Islamic motifs and drawings from the history of the two cultures are incorporated into the design of the building, for example the tented ceiling, which is reminiscent of a Bedouin tent. The obelisk, which can be seen outside the entrance, is an Arabic feature inscribed with ancient Celtic symbols from Newgrange. Obelisks have a special place in Arabic culture and were originally called “tekhenu” by the first builders, the Ancient Egyptians. Sun obelisks were built to represent the light of knowledge. The intention of the design to reflect Ireland's lengthy cultural and innovative history merged with this sensitively with the Middle Eastern setting. Composed of two main areas, the building is connected by bridges and galleries.

=== Student activities ===
The university currently has over 50 clubs and societies. Academic organizations include Medics for Humanity, Nursing, Medics in Leadership, Student Journal of Health, Neuroscience Society, Surgical Society, and Medical Research. Students participate in the International Research Summer School (IRSS) programme, which is an exchange programme that allows students the opportunity to experience the cultures of their respective host cities. Among the university's largest social events are the Winter Ball and International Night.

Research interests at the university span a number of topics in medicine and nursing, education & practice and basic biomedical science & clinical medicine. The university has a biomedical science laboratory with facilities to undertake molecular biology, microbiology, chemical synthesis & purification, molecular modelling and microscopy. There is also a full optics and laser laboratory and dental research equipment. The annual International Research Conference and Symposium on Regenerative Medicine For Tissue Healing features plenary sessions with state of the art talks, oral and poster sessions from around the GCC as well as from the US, UK, China, Japan, Ireland and Australia. The university is a National Institutes of Health Clinical Center remote site for the Introduction to the Principles and Practice of Clinical Research (IPPCR) Course. The university also hosts an annual international research conference that attracts over 100 abstracts.

== See also ==
- Royal College of Surgeons
- Royal College of Surgeons in Ireland
- Royal College of Physicians of Ireland
- Royal College of Surgeons of England
- RCSI Institute of Leadership
- List of universities in Bahrain
- List of hospitals in Bahrain
- Faculty of Dentistry of the Royal College of Surgeons in Ireland
