= Cabinet of Bahrain =

Formal Body of the Government in Bahrain

The Cabinet of Bahrain is the chief executive body of the Kingdom of Bahrain. According to Article 32 (b) of the 2002 Constitution, "executive authority is vested in the King together with the Council of Ministers and Ministers". The Council of Ministers (Cabinet) is appointed directly by the King (Article 33d).

Bahrain has had two Prime Ministers since the country's independence in 1971, Khalifa bin Salman Al Khalifa, the uncle of the reigning King Hamad ibn Isa al-Khalifah. Khalifa bin Salman Al Khalifa died on 11 November 2020, and was succeeded by the King's son, Crown Prince Salman bin Hamad Al Khalifa.

== Cabinet members ==
The current Cabinet was appointed on 21 November 2022, with the replacement of two ministers on 6 November 2024

Incumbent	Office	Website	Since
Prince Salman bin Hamad Al Khalifa	Crown Prince, Prime Minister	pmo.gov.bh	11 November 2020
Shaikh Khalid bin Abdulla Al Khalifa	Deputy Prime Minister		21 November 2022
Ministers
Shaikh Rashid bin Abdulla Al Khalifa	Minister of Interior	interior.gov.bh	22 May 2004
Shaikh Isa bin Salman Al Khalifa	Minister of the Prime Minister's Court		2 June 2025
Abdullatif bin Rashid AlZayani	Minister of Foreign Affairs	mofa.gov.bh	11 February 2020
Shaikh Salman bin Khalifa Al Khalifa	Minister of Finance and National Economy	mofne.gov.bh	4 December 2018
Ghanim bin Fadhl AlBuainain	Minister of Parliamentary Affairs	mopa.gov.bh	6 December 2014
Abdulla bin Hasan AlNuaimi	Minister of Defence Affairs		4 December 2018
Wael bin Nasser AlMubarak	Minister of Municipalities Affairs and Agriculture	mun.gov.bh	13 June 2022
Mohammed bin Mubarak bin Daina	Minister of Oil and Environment	moo.gov.bh	13 June 2022
Shaikh Abdulla bin Ahmed Al Khalifa	Minister of Transportation and Telecommunications	mtt.gov.bh	6 November 2024
Ibrahim bin Hassan Al Hawaj	Minister of Works	works.gov.bh	13 June 2022
Yousif bin Abdulhussain Khalaf	Minister of Labour and Minister of Legal Affairs	mola.gov.bh	13 June 2022
Yasser bin Ibrahim Humaidan	Minister of Electricity and Water Affairs	ewa.bh	13 June 2022
Jalila bint Al Sayyed Jawad Hassan	Minister of Health	moh.gov.bh	13 June 2022
Nawaf bin Mohammed Al-Mawadah	Minister of Justice, Islamic Affairs and Waqf	moj.gov.bh	13 June 2022
Hamad bin Faisal Al Malki	Minister of Cabinet Affairs		13 June 2022
Amna bint Ahmed Al Romaihi	Minister of Housing and Urban Planning	housing.gov.bh	13 June 2022
Noor bint Ali Al Khulaif	Minister of Sustainable Development	sdgs.gov.bh	13 June 2022
Fatima bint Jaffer Al Sairafi	Minister of Tourism	btea.bh	13 June 2022
Ramzan bin Abdulla Al Nuaimi	Minister of Information	mia.gov.bh	13 June 2022
Mohammed bin Mubarak Juma	Minister of Education	moe.gov.bh	21 November 2022
Abdulla bin Adel Fakhro	Minister of Industry and Commerce	moic.gov.bh	21 November 2022
Rawan bint Najeeb Tawfiqi	Minister of Youth Affairs	mya.gov.bh	21 November 2022
Osama bin Saleh Al Alawi	Minister of Social Development	social.gov.bh	6 November 2024
