= National Health Regulatory Authority (Bahrain) =

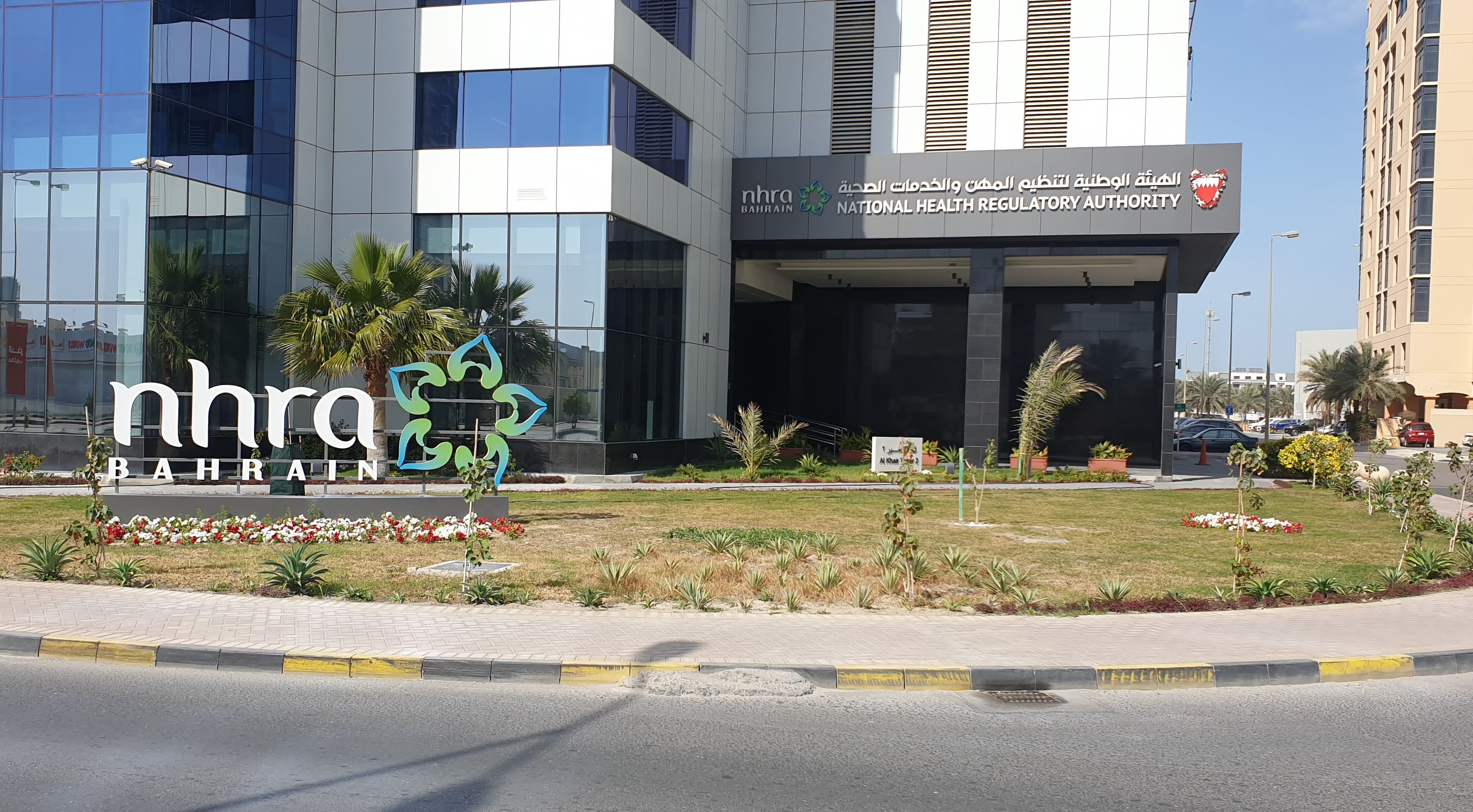
- NHRA office in Al Khair Towers, Sanabis, Bahrain

Authority overview
- Formed: 2010 (16 years ago)
- Type: Regulatory authority
- Headquarters: Sanabis, Manama; 26.22971823747169°N 50.546066955443386°E
- Authority executive: Mariam Adhbi Al-Jalahma, CEO
- Parent Authority: Ministry of Health
- Website: www.nhra.bh

The National Health Regulatory Authority (NHRA) is an independent regulatory body established in 2010, under Law No. 38 of 2009, of the Kingdom of Bahrain.

Bahrain's hospitals, medical centres, pharmacies, physicians, surgeons, nurses, pharmacists, medical technicians and allied healthcare institutions and healthcare professionals must be registered with, and/or licensed, by NHRA.

== Mission, vision and goals ==
According to the NHRA's website, its mission is "to regulate the provision of healthcare in Bahrain and ensure appropriateness, continuity, efficiency and safety in delivering health services, both in the governmental and private sector. It will be based on the best scientific evidence and healthcare best practices, in accordance to international standards".

As per the authority's statements NHRA's Vision is "to ensure safe and high quality in the delivery of healthcare in the kingdom".

Its strategic goals include the regulation and accountability of all healthcare facilities so that they meet the required standards for licensing, the continuous monitoring of the quality of the provision of health services - to ensure compliance with evidence-based practices and accreditation standards - and the preservation and protection of patients' health rights, as well as the rights and the safety of all people who use the health care facilities.

NHRA's responsibilities listed on its official website are: (1) Issue regulations and executive decisions concerning the organization of professions and health services (2) Grant and renew licences for health professionals and healthcare facilities (3) Investigate patients complaints (3) Determine the terms and conditions for the use of health care informatics (4) Monitor, evaluate and accredit healthcare facilities (5) Undertake disciplinary hearings of licensees regarding professional misconduct (6) Approving clinical trials (7) Registration and licensing of medical devices (8) Setting the rules for drug registration and pricing, and ensure the quality of medicines and pharmaceuticals.

On 4 July 2020, in an online lecture for the Shura Council on health sector legislation, the Chief Executive Officer of NHRA Dr Mariam Al Jalahma said that NHRA is responsible "for the implementation and development of health regulations in both governmental and private sectors in Bahrain. This involves regulatory procedures related to licensing health care facilities as well as licensing health care professionals within them".

== Leadership and policy ==
The CEO Dr Mariam Al Jalahma mentioned in her interview to the Oxford Business Group that NHRA ensures that there are no malpractices in the import of medical equipment and essential drugs. According to her, NHRA also verifies the authenticity of degrees and certificates of healthcare professionals like nurses, doctors and pharmacists, before licensing them to work in Bahrain.

During an online lecture, organized by the Bahrain Institute for Public Development (BIPD) for the Shura Council, on health sector legislation and the role of the NHRA on 4 July 2020, Dr Mariam Al Jalahma had said that NHRA is ready "to receive patient complaints about medical and professional errors and to investigate them. It is also ready to receive reports about medical and professional errors and serious accidents by institutions in order to ensure action is taken, to improve performance and to take disciplinary measures against health guilty professions practitioners".

The Chief Executive Officer of NHRA, Dr. Mariam Adhbi Al-Jalahma, is listed among the 100 Most Influential Arab Personalities in the field of social responsibility in 2020, by the Regional Network for Social Responsibility. The honouring is in recognition of Dr. Al-Jalahma’s key role in promoting the social responsibility culture.

== Response to Covid-19 ==
In December 2020, NHRA announced it has officially approved the registration of Sinopharm’s COVID-19 vaccine after the submission of all related documentation by G42 Healthcare, the company's exclusive distributor in the Middle East and North Africa. And with NHRA's approval of Pfizer-BioNTech COVID-19 Vaccine, Bahrain became the second country in the world to grant an Emergency Use Authorisation (EUA) for the vaccine.

On 25 January 2021, the National Health Regulatory Authority (NHRA) announced that it approved the emergency use of the Oxford–AstraZeneca COVID-19 vaccine manufactured by the Serum Institute of India under the name ‘Covishield’.

The fourth Vaccine approved by Bahrain’s NHRA is Sputnik V COVID-19 vaccine.

The National Health Regulatory Authority (NHRA) has also authorized, as the fifth vaccine, the emergency use of Janssen COVID-19 vaccine from Johnson and Johnson. Bahrain became the first country in the world to approve this particular vaccine.

== See also ==
- Healthcare in Bahrain
- List of hospitals in Bahrain
