= Bahrain Specialist Hospital =

Geography
- Location: Juffair, Bahrain
- Coordinates: 26.219759°N 50.614477°E

History
- Opened: 2002

Links
- Website: bahrainspecialisthospital.com
- Lists: Hospitals in Bahrain

The Bahrain Specialist Hospital (BSH; Arabic: مستشفى البحرين التخصصي) is a comprehensive acute care hospital situated in Juffair, in the Kingdom of Bahrain. BSH is supported by shareholders from Bahrain, Saudi Arabia, Kuwait, and the United Arab Emirates. It is directed by the managing director Dr. Kasim Ardati, and was inaugurated in February 2003 under the patronage of King Hamad bin Isa Al Khalifa. Dr. Najah Al Zayyani is credited with founding the hospital.

== Services ==
The hospital provides more than twenty-five medical specialties, as well as psychiatric and dental care, nutrition and health sciences and plastic surgery. It has 83 private inpatient beds, 12 day surgery beds and 6 patient intensive care wards.

== See also ==
- List of hospitals in Bahrain
