= Bahrain Royal Medical Services =

- Bahrain Defence Force
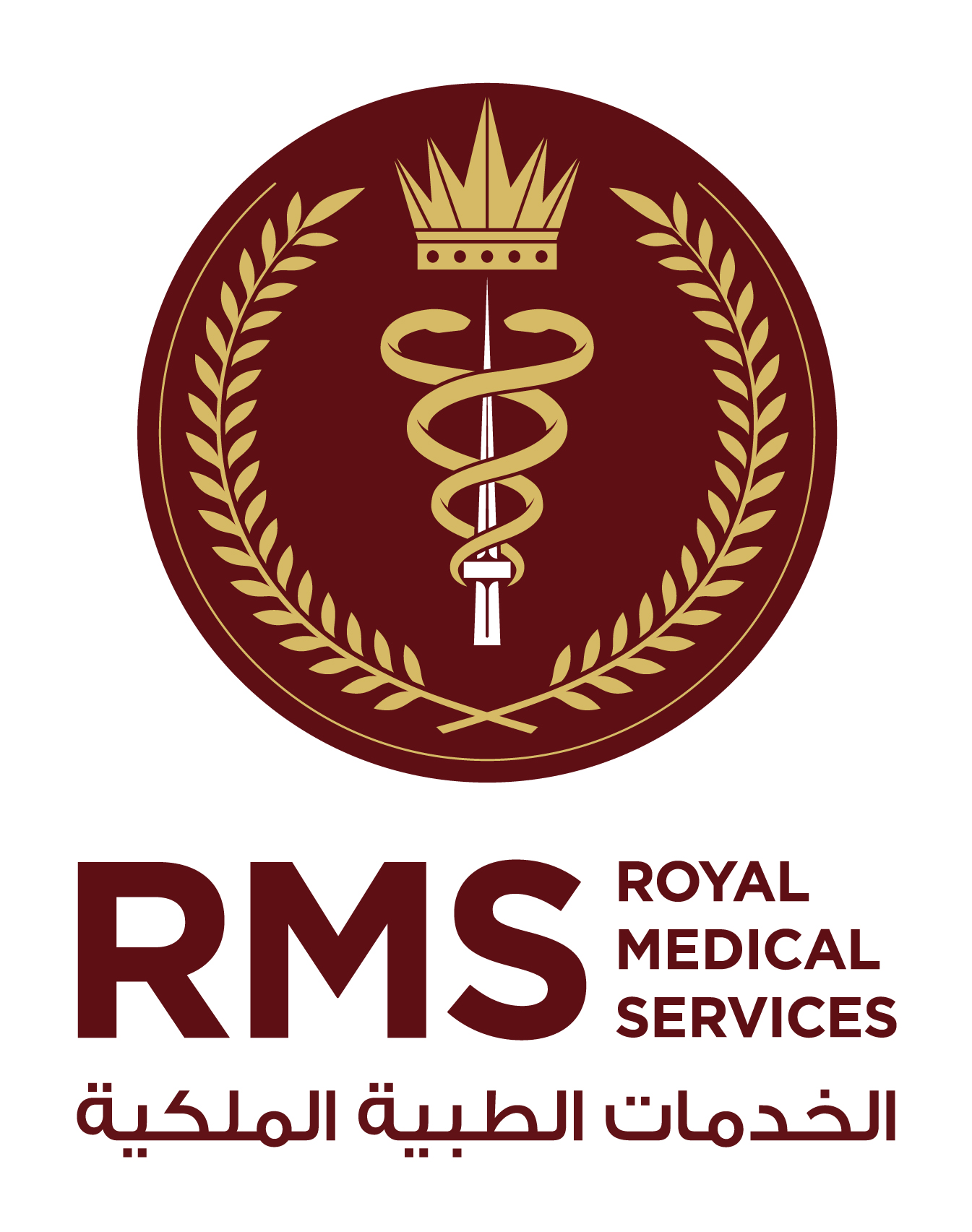

Geography
- Location: Riffa, Bahrain
- Coordinates: 26.135882°N 50.525300°E

Organisation
- Type: Military hospital
- Affiliated university: RCSI Bahrain

Services
- Emergency department: Yes
- Beds: 400

History
- Founded: 1968

Links
- Website: rms.bh/ar-BH/
- Lists: Hospitals in Bahrain
- Other links: Bahrain Defence Force

Bahrain Royal Medical Services (Arabic: الخدمات الطبية الملكية البحرينية, romanized: al-Khidmāt aṭ-Ṭibbiyya al-Malakiyya al-Baḥrayniyya), also known as Bahrain Defense Force Hospital, is one of the major hospitals in the Kingdom of Bahrain, and the only hospital in the country where free health care is provided exclusively for Bahraini military personnel.

== Overview ==
Committed to advanced care and advanced caring, Bahrain Defense Force Royal Medical Services (BDFRMS) Hospitals Health System offers the region's largest network of primary care physicians, outpatient center and hospital. The System also includes a network of specialty care physicians, skilled nursing, geriatric health, behavioral health, rehabilitation and home care services, managed care and insurance programs, and occupational health and wellness.

Nearly 4,000 physicians and employees comprise BDFRMS Hospitals Health System.

BDFRMS Hospitals Health System's goal is to provide comprehensive primary and community-based care, the kind of healthcare people need most, as well as access to the highest quality specialty care when necessary.

The Bahrain Defense Force Hospital has a total bed capacity of 400 beds including that of inpatient, outpatient, and emergency patients. The hospital ranks as the second largest hospital in Bahrain, constituting all clinical infrastructure and highly trained medical staff.

The main mission of the BDF Hospital is to provide health care services for the Military and Interior forces (i.e. both primary and secondary health care), emergency services for the public, specialised medical for referral patients, and government VIPs. All Bahrain residents and non-residents are entitled to free health care services and treatment.

== See also ==
- List of hospitals in Bahrain
