= Salmaniya =

Neighbourhood of Manama, Bahrain

- Neighborhood
- Country: Bahrain
- Governorate: Capital Governorate

Salmaniya is a district located in the city of Manama, Bahrain.

== Healthcare ==
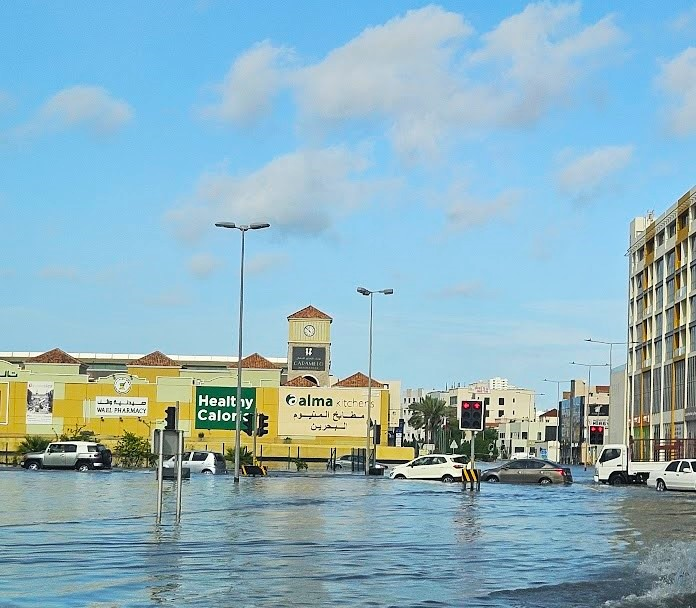
A road intersection in Salmaniya, flooded in 2024.

The largest public hospital in Bahrain, Salmaniya Medical Complex, and the country's only public Psychiatric Hospital. Other private hospitals operate within the vicinity such as the Royal Bahrain Hospital.

== History ==
The neighborhood houses many residential flats and apartments, as well as having many local supermarkets in the vicinity.

The Water Garden is also situated in Salmaniya. It was first opened in 1948 and is spread over 6.5 hectares of land. It was closed for renovations for six years in the late 2010s and was reopened in January 2023.

In April 2024, parts of Salmaniya flooded in the aftermath of heavy rain in the Gulf region.
