= Health in Bahrain =

Life expectancy in Bahrain at birth in 2013 was 76 for men and 78 for women. Compared to many countries in the region, the prevalence of AIDS and HIV is relatively low. Malaria and tuberculosis (TB) do not constitute major problems in Bahrain as neither disease is indigenous to the country. As a result, cases of malaria and TB have declined in recent decades with cases of contractions amongst Bahraini nationals becoming rare. The Ministry of Health sponsors regular vaccination campaigns against TB and other diseases such as hepatitis B.

Bahrain is currently suffering from an obesity epidemic as 28.9% of all males and 38.2% of all females are classified as obese. Cardiovascular diseases account for 32% of all deaths in Bahrain, being the number one cause of death in the country (the second being cancer). Sickle cell anaemia and thalassaemia are prevalent in the country, with a study concluding that 18% of Bahrainis are carriers of sickle cell anaemia while 24% are carriers of thalassaemia.

== Obesity ==
The Food and Agriculture Organization estimates that almost 66% of the adult population of Bahrain is overweight or obese. In 2000, it was determined that amongst children age 12–17, 29.9% of boys and 42.4% of girls were overweight. The MONICA project, sponsored by the WHO, found that 15.6% of boys and 17.4% of girls in high school were obese. Bahrain also has one of the highest prevalence of diabetes in the world (5th place), with more than 15% of the Bahraini population suffering from the disease, and accounting for 5% of deaths in the country.

Increased consumption of fast food and predominance of sedentary lifestyles have led to this occurrence. These unhealthy eating habits are reinforced in school canteens, where high fat and high carbohydrate foods such as pizza, burgers, sandwiches, and za'atar, are available for lunch. Between meal times, children prefer French fries, chocolate, and soda, which lack micronutrients and dietary fiber.

== Smoking ==
Within the last 10 years, Bahrain has enforced stricter laws on smoking. Research suggested that the leading health problem among its people is coronary disease, therefore the leaders issued laws in hopes to help the health of their country. Smoking is not just the issue, but all forms of tobacco products. The largest ban that the Bahraini leaders decided on was the ban of smoking or the use of tobacco products from public places. More specifically, public places include any form of public transportation, schools and universities, entertainment venues, elevators, places of worship, etc. The managers of these specific places are required, by law, to make it obvious with a physical sign notifying the customers that their places prohibit smoking. The signs should be where the people can see them and the managers should take them seriously as well. Also, Bahrain has set up designated smoking areas for smokers that are away from the prohibited smoking areas that must be “equipped with special ventilation fans” so that the smoke fumes will not exit and go to the public.

In addition to the ‘no smoking in public places’ law, Bahrain has also issued a law on the advertisement of smoking and tobacco products in general. Tobacco products include cigarettes, cigars, various electronic cigarettes, hookahs, and chewing tobacco. Hookahs and the water pipes are common. Physicians have studied uses of tobacco and the conclusion was that the physicians in Bahrain smoke water pipes more than cigarettes, but they are still as harmful to the body. The advertisement of any of these tobacco products is against the law in Bahrain. It is illegal to endorse these over billboards, advertisements, or commercials to “promote or encourage smoking”. The laws and regulations that you must follow in Bahrain are extremely evident and everyone has access to what these laws are. If someone were to disobey the laws that are in place, they will get fined and face legal issues. For example, if a police officer were to see someone explicitly smoking in a designated non-smoking area, he/she has every right to fine that individual. The fine is 20 BD which is $50 in American dollars.

The smoking laws were originally put in place to protect the health of the people who live in or may visit Bahrain in the future. A study look into Bahraini men “was to determine the knowledge on tobacco smoking and past smoking related behavior”. The results showed that 26.3% smoked in front of a child and 76.2% have smoked in front of another person. It is very clear that the people living in Bahrain lacked knowledge of the hazards of second-hand smoking. In addition, the leaders decided on a law that is extremely important. This law is the law that forbids anyone to smoke tobacco in the vicinity of a child, specifically in an enclosed automobile. This law was created and put into action to protect the child's health. “The level of the mother’s and father’s education significantly influenced the exposure of children to passive smoking” studies have shown. Although the child is not actually smoking the tobacco product, the child can undergo second-hand smoke exposure which scientists have revealed that it could be worse than first-hand. The side effects of smoking and second-hand smoking are all bad and sessions with a counselor have helped individuals give up and quit tobacco use. These people have also said their life satisfaction has also increased. Also, Bahrain wants to be a safe country to live in and safe for tourists. It is actually illegal to smoke while driving, regardless if a child is present or not, preventing distracted driving. Bahrain enforced strict smoking laws nearly 10 years ago in hopes to shape the health of its people and to protect the bystanders and children who just happen to be around the smoking individual.

== See also ==
- Healthcare in Bahrain
