= Clarice Herzog =

Brazilian sociologist and human rights activist

Clarice Ribeiro Chaves Herzog
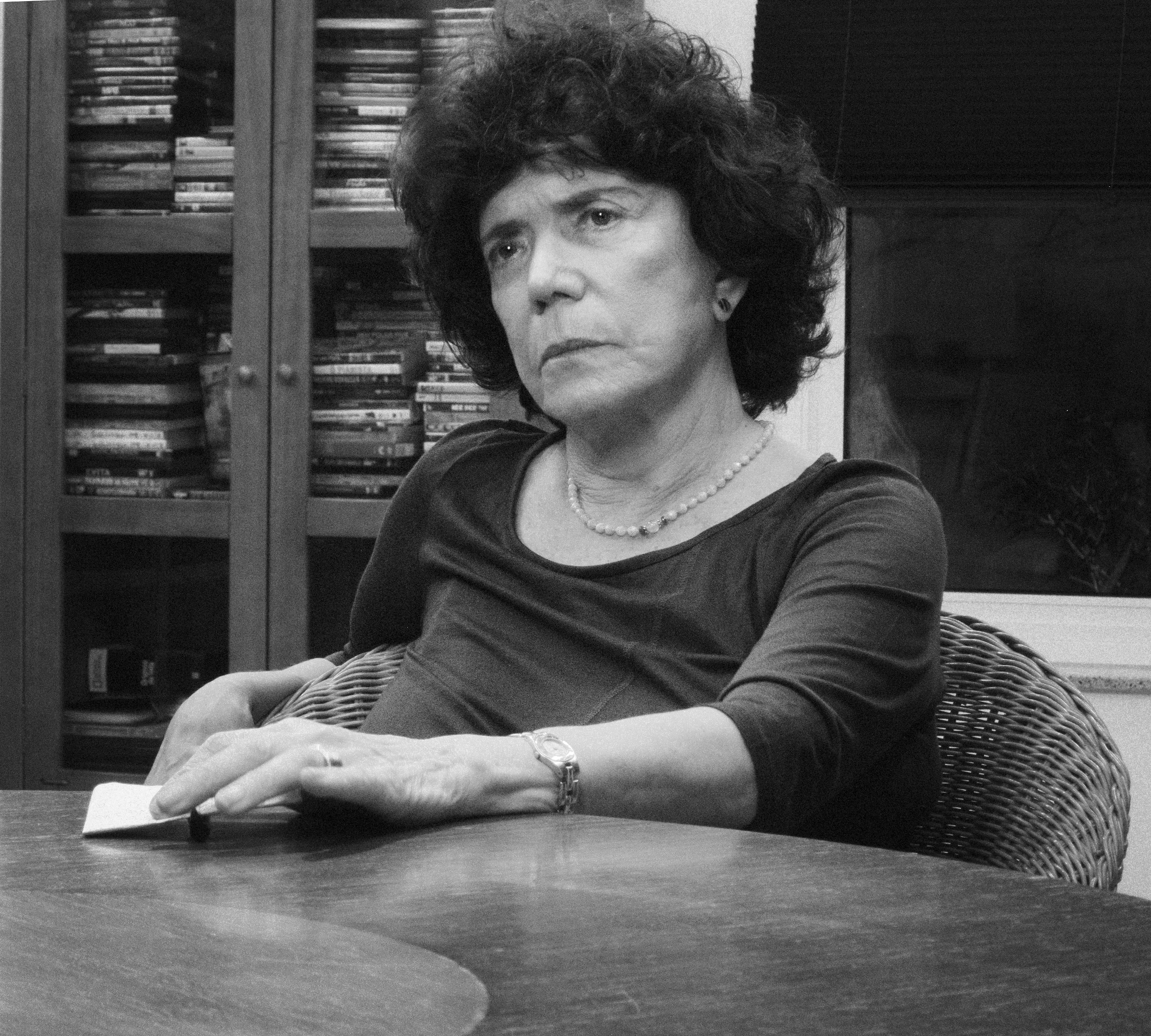
- Clarice Herzog
- Born: July 1, 1941 (age 85); São Paulo, São Paulo, Brazil
- Citizenship: Brazilian
- Education: University of São Paulo
- Occupations: Sociologist; Activist
- Years active: 1975–present
- Organization: Instituto Vladimir Herzog
- Known for: Advocacy for human rights and democracy in Brazil following the murder of her husband, journalist Vladimir Herzog
- Spouse: Vladimir Herzog (m. 1964; died 1975)
- Awards: Legislative Merit Medal (Alesp, 2024)

Clarice Ribeiro Chaves Herzog (July 1, 1941) is a Brazilian sociologist and activist, known for her work in defense of human rights and democracy in Brazil. She became one of the leading voices in the quest for justice in the case of the murder of her husband, journalist Vladimir Herzog, who was killed in 1975 by the Brazilian military dictatorship.

== Biography ==
Of German and Italian descent, Clarice was born in the city of São Paulo, in the Pinheiros neighborhood, in 1941. She earned a degree in social sciences from the University of São Paulo (USP) in the 1960s. While attending college, Clarice met Vladimir Herzog, who was finishing his degree in philosophy, also at USP. They married in February 1964, shortly before the military coup that deposed President João Goulart. After their marriage, the couple moved to London, where their two sons, Ivo Herzog and André Herzog, were born.

The couple returned to Brazil in 1968, when Clarice began her career in research and advertising, where she went on to specialize in market research.

On October 25, 1975, Vladimir Herzog, then director of journalism at TV Cultura, voluntarily reported to the Departamento de Operações de Informações — Centro de Operações de Defesa Interna (DOI-CODI) in São Paulo to give a statement. Hours later, he was found dead on the agency’s premises. The military regime officially declared that Herzog had committed suicide, a version later refuted by various investigations and testimonies.

Clarice Herzog was one of the first to publicly challenge the official account, declaring that her husband had been murdered under torture. Vladimir’s funeral, held at the Butantã Jewish Cemetery, became a symbolic act of resistance: defying the Jewish tradition that reserves specific areas for those who have committed suicide, Clarice and her family decided to bury him in the central part of the cemetery. A few days later, the interfaith ceremony at the São Paulo Cathedral brought together more than 8,000 people and marked one of the largest public demonstrations against military repression. Religious leaders from different faiths, such as Cardinal Paulo Evaristo Arns, Rabbi Henry Sobel, and Pastor James Wright, played a key role in organizing the event.

During the dictatorship, Clarice filed a declaratory action against the Brazilian government, holding it responsible for her husband’s death. Decades later, Clarice continued to seek international recognition of the case. In 2012, Vladimir Herzog’s death certificate was amended to officially state “death resulting from injuries and mistreatment suffered while in the custody of the Second Army—DOI-CODI,” replacing the previous listing of suicide.

In 2009, with the support of the Center for Justice and International Law (CEJIL), she brought the Herzog Case before the Inter-American Court of Human Rights. In 2018, the Court found Brazil guilty of failing to investigate and punish those responsible, recognizing Vladimir Herzog’s murder as a crime against humanity.

== Legacy ==
Clarice Herzog has remained active in the causes of human rights and democracy for more than four decades. Since 2009, she has served as president of the Vladimir Herzog Institute, a civil society organization dedicated to promoting remembrance, justice, and the defense of human rights.

She was awarded the Legislative Merit Medal by the São Paulo State Legislative Assembly (Alesp) in April 2024 for her struggle against the military dictatorship. The initiative was led by Representative Beth Sahão (PT).

In 2025, at the age of 83, Clarice was diagnosed with Alzheimer’s disease. That same year, she was granted the right to a lifetime pension by the Brazilian courts, calculated based on the salary Vladimir Herzog would have been entitled to had he been alive, in recognition of the state’s responsibility for his death.

== In popular culture ==
Released in 1978, the documentary Eunice, Clarice, Thereza, directed by Joatan Berbel, tells the story of three widows of political prisoners: Clarice Herzog; Thereza Fiel (widow of factory worker Manoel Fiel Filho); and Eunice Paiva (widow of Rubens Paiva). These three women joined forces against the military dictatorship and its repression.

Clarice is mentioned in the song O Bêbado e a Equilibrista, composed by João Bosco and Aldir Blanc, and recorded by Elis Regina. The lyrics refer to three specific people linked to the political struggle. One verse calls for the return of those in exile: “My Brazil dreams of the return of Henfil’s brother / Of so many people who have left.” (“Que sonha com a volta do irmão do Henfil / Com tanta gente que partiu.”) The same verse mentions “Marias and Clarices weep” (“Choram Marias e Clarices”), referring to the families of political prisoners who died while in the custody of Brazilian military intelligence: Maria, daughter of metalworker Manoel Fiel Filho, and Clarice Herzog, wife of journalist Vladimir Herzog. Both Filho and Herzog were accused of “alleged communist activities” and were said to have died by suicide, but it was later revealed that they had died as a result of torture.
