= Ternuma =

- Founded: 1998
- Type: Non-governmental organization, NGO
- Purpose: Historical Revisionism, Far-right

Ternuma (acronym for Terrorism Never Again) is a non-governmental organization formed in 1998 by military, ex-military, family members and their sympathizers that aims to interdict and deny the past about the military dictatorship in Brazil from 1964 to 1985.

Despite not assuming an explicit political definition, Ternuma has ostensibly praised the 1964 coup, recalled the cases of deaths by armed groups opposing the current regime and strongly criticized the property occupations promoted by the Landless Workers' Movement. It is considered to be a far-right organization. Na edição de 5 de abril daquele ano, em aquecimento para a campanha presidencial de 2010, quando seu candidato eterno, o tucano José Serra, enfrentaria a então ministra Dilma Rousseff, a Folha veiculou, junto com reportagem que tratava de um suposto plano de sequestro do então ministro Delfim Netto, durante a ditadura, um documento falso sobre a ministra da Casa Civil, Dilma Rousseff. Meses depois, à fórceps, o jornal admitiria parcialmente que ‘a ficha’ publicada fora obtida por e-mail, e pinçada de um site de extrema-direita, ‘Ternuma'.

The name adopted emerged as a counterpoint to Torture Never Again, founded in 1985 by victims of political repression during the dictatorship. Since its creation, the Ternuma group has opposed the granting of compensation to family members who had dead or missing relatives because it considers that several of those militants had committed acts of terror. According to the group's accounts, 119 people were killed by left-wing terrorism, with no right to compensation under the original bill (Law No. 9,140, known as the Law of Political Missing Persons in Brazil) approved on December 4, 1995, in the government of Fernando Henrique Cardoso, and which provides for public reparation for those affected by political instability between 1961 and 1988.

In 2002, commentator Miriam Leitão claimed to have received threats from the Ternuma group's website, for making a comparison between the death of journalist Tim Lopes (killed that year by drug traffickers from the Comando Vermelho group in Rio de Janeiro) and the murder of Vladimir Herzog, at the DOI-CODI facilities, in São Paulo, in 1975.

In 2008, Ternuma classified the Brazilian Army command as "cowardly" and "silent", for failing to defend the retired colonel Carlos Alberto Brilhante Ustra, who had been convicted by the Brazilian justice for the kidnapping and torture of five members of the Almeida Teles family, whose parents were members of the PCdoB in the years 1972 and 1973.

== Bibliography ==
- Rocha, Luzimary dos Santos (2015). "Terrorismo nunca mais (Ternuma): "A farda não abafa o cidadão no peito do soldado"". Revista Eletrônica de Ciência Política. 6 (2). doi:10.5380/recp.v6i2.44069. ISSN 2236-451X.
- "Dilma usa ficha falsa em vídeo oficial de campanha". Terra. "O mais grave é que o jornal Folha de S.Paulo estampou na página A10, acompanhando o texto da reportagem, uma ficha policial falsa sobre mim. Essa falsificação circula pelo menos desde 30 de novembro do ano passado na internet, postada no site www.ternuma.com.br ("terrorismo nunca mais"), atribuindo-me diversas ações que não cometi e pelas quais nunca respondi, nem nos constantes interrogatórios, nem nas sessões de tortura a que fui submetida quando fui presa pela ditadura. Registre-se também que nunca fui denunciada ou processada pelos atos mencionados na ficha falsa."

== See also ==
- A Verdade Sufocada
- Human rights in Brazil
- Viva Brazil Movement
- Sérgio Paranhos Fleury
- Terrorism in Brazil
