= Jaime Wright =

Presbyterian Pastor and Human Rights Activist

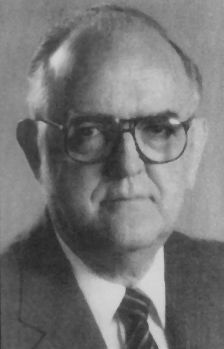
- Born: July 12, 1927; Curitiba, Paraná, Brazil
- Died: May 29, 1999 (aged 71)
- Occupation: Human Rights Activist Presbyterian Pastor
- Parent: Lotan Ephrain Wright (father) Maggie Belle Wright (mother)
- Relatives: Paulo Stuart Wright (brother)

Jaime Nelson Wright (Curitiba, July 12, 1927 - Vitória, May 29, 1999) was a Brazilian presbyterian pastor and human rights activist.

== Biography ==
Son of American presbyterian missionaries, Jaime Wright graduated from the University of Arkansas and post-graduated in the University of Pennsylvania, exercising the post of Minister of the Interior in the State of Bahia, standing out in Caetité, at the end of the 1960s and the start of the 1970s. There, he excelled in his post by denouncing embezzlement that occurred inside departments of the state's government. This posture started the first persecution against him, persecution made by a regime that didn't tolerate its ill-doings being exposed. In 1968, Wright made the Caetité's masonic store approve a declaration that condemned human rights' transgressions.

In 1973, his brother, Paulo Wright, impeached state deputy for Santa Catarina and left-wing activist, went missing inside the dictatorship basement. Jaime then started a fight that made him collect a vast collection of documents about torture and murder practiced by the Estate. Secretly, he united with São Paulo's archbishop and cardinal Dom Paulo Evaristo Arns and the rabbi Henry Sobel, ending in the publishing of the book Brasil: Nunca Mais in 1985 – a landmark of human rights' history in the country, in which torture and the torturers are exposed based on the extensive material compiled by Jaime.

In this occasion, around 1974, Jaime Wright was one of the first to rebel against the posture of reverend Boanerges Ribeiro that, with impositional attitude, lent support of Presbyterian entities to the military regime. The activist participated in the foundation of a dissident entity that separated themselves from the Brazilian Presbyterian Church, the FENIP, nucleus that generated the present day United Presbyterian Church of Brazil.

More than 700 legal proceedings were consulted, with 1,800 cases of people being tortured and 125 missed during the dark period between the years 1964 and 1979. He triggered the encounter between Dom Paulo and Jimmy Carter, where a list of missing politicians in the dictatorial regime was given.

His name figures in the list of Brazilians that most contributed to the repudiation of torture in the country, in the name of citizenship and the fundamental rights of men. He wrote the movie "O Punhal" (Portuguese for "The Dagger") in 1959, produced in Itacira, municipality of Wagner (Bahia), by reverend Ricardo William Waddel.

== See also ==
- Grupo Tortura Nunca Mais
- Vladimir Herzog
