= Amelinha Teles =

Brazilian journalist, writer and human rights activist (1944–2026)

- Teles in 2023
- Born: Maria Amélia de Almeida Teles; 6 October 1944; Contagem, Minas Gerais, Brazil
- Died: 15 September 2026 (aged 81); São Paulo, São Paulo, Brazil
- Occupations: Journalist, writer, human rights activist

Maria Amélia de Almeida "Amelinha" Teles (6 October 1944 – 15 September 2026) was a Brazilian journalist, writer and human rights activist. She was a militant of the Communist Party of Brazil (PCdoB) against the military dictatorship, which led to her arrest and torture by the DOI-CODI. From then on, she was one of the main voices denouncing the abuses suffered during the regime.

Teles developed work in historical feminist activism. She was director of the São Paulo Women's Union, coordinator of the Popular Legal Promoters Project, a member of the Advisory Council of the Dandara Center, and author of several books on the subject. She also served on the Commission of Relatives of the Dead and Disappeared for Political Reasons and was an advisor to the São Paulo State Truth Commission "Rubens Paiva".

== Life and career ==
=== Background ===
Maria Amélia de Almeida Teles was born in the city of Contagem, Minas Gerais, on 6 October 1944. Her political activism began in 1960, when she joined the Brazilian Communist Party (PCB) at a young age, influenced by her father. Alongside her younger sister Criméia, she was arrested in 1964 shortly after the 1964 coup d'état at the Barro Preto Barracks in the Minas Gerais capital, where they were detained for two nights accused of subversion.

The sisters had been living in hiding since 1965, and an internal split in the PCB in 1968 led them to join the Communist Party of Brazil (PCdoB). Married to César Teles, Teles managed a printing press and helped produce the party's newspaper.

Teles was arrested on 28 December 1972, and taken to Operation Bandeirantes (Oban), where she was subjected to torture sessions, which, according to her testimony, were carried out personally by Army Major Carlos Alberto Brilhante Ustra, then commander of the DOI-CODI in São Paulo. Her husband, César Augusto Teles, and her fellow activist, Carlos Nicolau Danielli, were also taken to the repressive agency, where Teles witnessed Danielli's murder. Her children, Edson and Janaína, aged 4 and 5, were also kidnapped and taken to Oban, where they saw their parents being tortured. The justification for her arrest was her participation in running a clandestine printing press for the PCdoB, according to Ustra's own autobiography.

Teles was 27 years old when she was arrested and tortured. She reported the horrors experienced during the Brazilian military dictatorship, exposed Ustra, and assisted families of the disappeared through the Truth Commission. Her sister Crimeia participated in the Araguaia Guerrilla, was also in her apartment, and was taken to the DOI-CODI along with her, eight months pregnant at the time. Through letters, she was Teles' only contact during her year and a half imprisonment in the DOI-CODI for her relations with the Communist Party of Brazil. Crimeia was released before Teles and became her source of information outside the prison. Carlos Nicolau, however, was not so lucky: tortured along with Amelia, he was murdered in front of her. In addition, she was also raped, later stating to the National Truth Commission that this was a systematic policy.

In 2005, the Teles family filed a declaratory action against Carlos Brilhante Ustra, who in 2008 became the first agent of the dictatorship to be declared a torturer. In March 2013, Teles testified before the National Truth Commission, a federal government body that operated between 2011 and 2014 to investigate serious human rights violations that occurred between 1946 and 1988. In her testimony, Teles stated that she had been a victim of various forms of torture, including electric shocks and sexual violence. In December 2014, the Superior Court of Justice (STJ) held Ustra responsible for the torture suffered by her, her husband, her two children (Edson Luiz and Janaína), and her sister Criméia Alice Schmidt de Almeida inside the DOI-CODI. Ustra was recognized as a torturer in the first instance in 2008 by Judge Gustavo Santini Teodoro of the 23rd Civil Court of São Paulo. The decision was confirmed by the Court of Justice of São Paulo in 2012. There is no mention in these judicial decisions of murders committed by Teles.

=== Activism for women's rights ===
In 1984, she founded the São Paulo Women's Union, and in 1987 and 1988 she participated in the Lipstick Lobby, an effort by feminists across the country to pressure parliamentarians to include advancements in the Constitution they were drafting. The Lipstick Lobby succeeded in getting 80% of women's demands approved to expand civil, economic, and social rights. For the first time, a constitution explicitly stated in its Article 5 that men and women are equal.

It was also during her time as an activist in the PCdoB that Teles said she understood herself to be a feminist. Upon encountering works such as those of the African-American activist and philosopher Angela Davis, she solidified her position, understanding her place in the movement. Around the same time that the UN General Assembly declared 1975 as the International Women's Year, Teles began writing for the Jornal Brasil Mulher, one of the first newspapers aimed at and produced by women.

Teles spearheaded the launch, in 1994, of the Popular Legal Promoters (PLPs) project, which provides legal training for women and teaches them to value the law, expand it, and learn the path to access justice. The course involves weekly meetings for one year, is taught at the City Hall, and broadcast online. They visit women's prisons in São Paulo and Campinas, and currently the training takes place in several cities across the country. In the state of São Paulo alone, more than 5,000 women from 25 municipalities have been trained.

She authored numerous articles and books on feminism and women's rights, including A Brief History of Feminism in Brazil, What is Violence Against Women, co-authored with Mônica de Melo, and What are women's human rights?, all published by Ed. Brasiliense. In 2024, she published Tales from Cell Three: Memoirs of a political prisoner during the dictatorship, her first work of fiction, in which she revisits an imaginary character created during her time in prison, the Talkative Lizard of Nascimento, using fictional narrative to address themes such as authoritarianism, political violence and resistance. Her feminist activism began in prison, working with women activists, former political prisoners or not, who spoke about feminism, sexuality and equal rights, issues that were and are part of her political work. In 2004, she was awarded the Carlota Pereira de Queiroz Prize, granted by the Chamber of Deputies on the occasion of the International Women's Day celebrations.

In 2018, Teles participated as a finalist in the Viva Award, promoted by Marie Claire magazine and the Avon Institute, in the civil society category of the debate "Origins of Feminist Movements and Theories", alongside Adriana Piscitelli, anthropologist and professor at Unicamp, in São Paulo, with mediation by Regiany Silva de Freitas, co-founder of Nós Mulheres da Periferia, an independent journalistic collective.

In 2026, Teles was honored by the Parliamentary Front for the Defense of Life and Protection of Women and Girls of the Legislative Assembly of São Paulo at the ceremony 'Women Who Move History', which recognized female personalities in the areas of health, entrepreneurship, science, art and activism for their contribution to the promotion of gender equality and the defense of women's rights.

=== Death ===
Teles died on 15 September 2026, at the age of 81.

== Awards ==
- 2004: Carlota Pereira de Queiroz Award
- 2018: Dom Paulo and Alceri Awards Honorable Mention Individual
- 2025: Rede Equidade Trophy
- 2026: Tribute "Women Who Move History"

== Bibliography ==
Selected works:

- A Brief History of Feminism in Brazil
- What Is Violence Against Women?
- What Are Women's Human Rights?
- Tales from Cell Three: Memoirs of a Political Prisoner During the Dictatorship
