= A Verdade Sufocada =

- Author: Carlos Alberto Brilhante Ustra
- Language: Portuguese
- Subject: Historical revisionism
- Genre: Memoir
- Published: 2006 by Editora Ser
- Publication place: Brazil
- Pages: 541
- ISBN: 8586662607

A Verdade Sufocada - A História que a Esquerda não quer que o Brasil conheça (in English: The Suffocated Truth - The story that the left does not want Brazil to know) (2006) is the second memoir of the retired colonel of the Brazilian Army, Carlos Alberto Brilhante Ustra, the first Brazilian military man convicted of practicing torture during the military dictatorship in Brazil (1964-1985).

The book presents Ustra's version of the left-wing armed struggle in Brazil during the military dictatorship, as well as recounting his experiences as head of DOI-CODI, one of Organs executing agencies of political repression, in which opponents of the dictatorship were tortured and murdered. According to Ustra and his family, the book was boycotted by bookstores at the time of release and the family needed to finance their print runs because of publishers' denials. The book received attention after being quoted by Jair Bolsonaro during his vote for Dilma Rousseff's Impeachment in 2016. In the weekly ranking of Folha de S.Paulo on June 4, 2016, the work was the sixth best-selling nonfiction book in Brazil. In 2018, it reached its 14th edition. The book received criticism from the academic world. Historians and sociologists warned of the book's unreliability as a historical document.

== The book ==
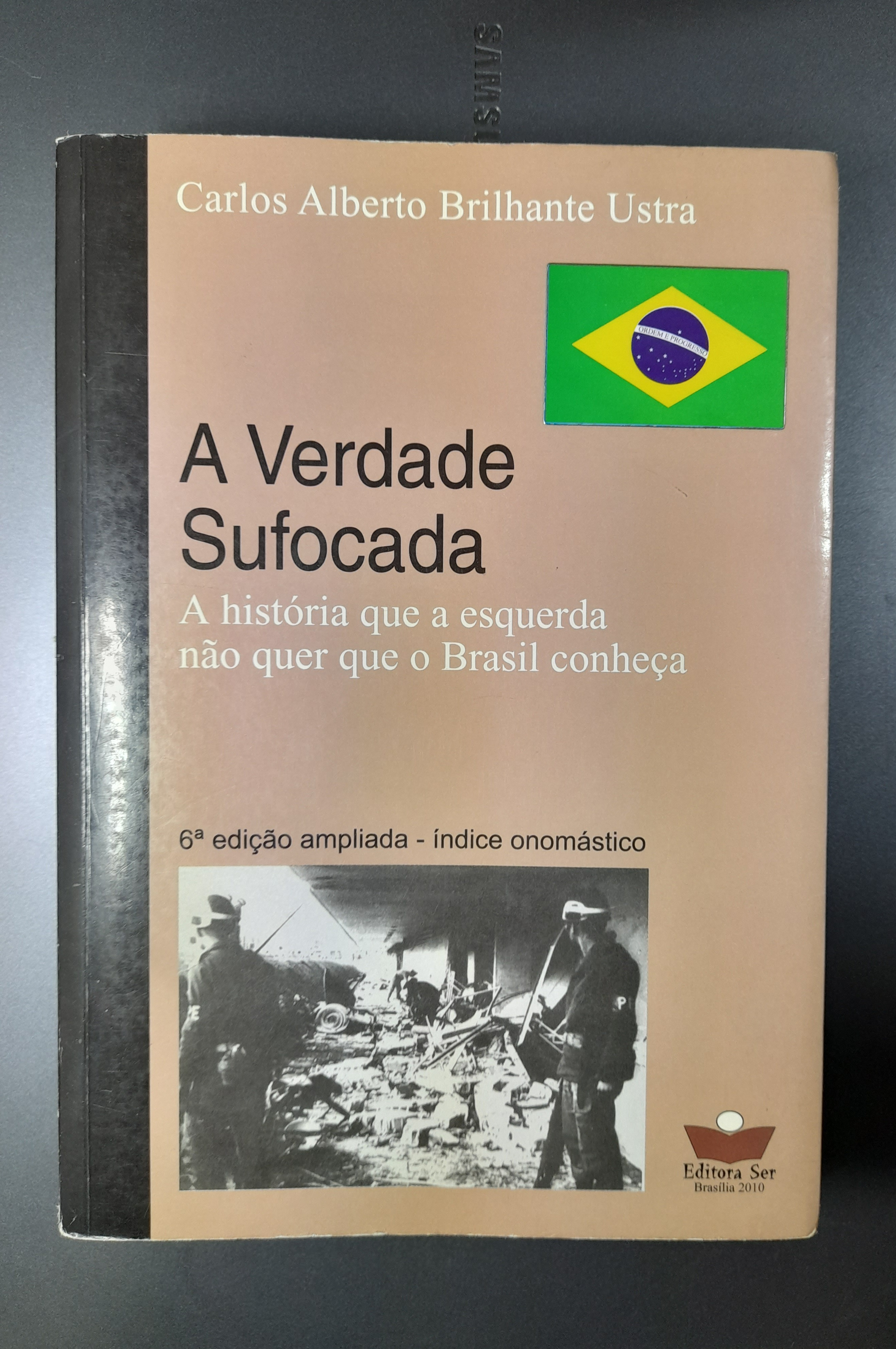
The book

The book brings the military version of what happened during the dictatorship, with a greater focus on the attacks by leftist groups during that period. He counted on the collaboration of the author's wife, who is a historian, giving focus to the context of the Cold War.

== Criticism ==
For UFPE sociology professor Luciano Oliveira, "as a history book, 'A Verdade Sufocada' is null. As a historical document, it serves a purpose: it is yet another confirmation that, within what I usually call modern sensibility, torture is an action that, regardless of its results, disgraces the person who employs it."

Neusah Cerveira, PhD in Social History from FFLCH/USP, draws attention to the absence of explicit bibliographic citations in the body of the text. She also says that "it is an extensive book, although superficial. With a strong title, but not very deep".

== Bibliography ==
- de Castro, Fernando Cibelli (2010). "A comunicação persuasiva como estratégia de controle da memória coletiva". PUCRS..
- Fernandes, Fabricio (2017). "As estratégias discursivas de perpetradores reflexões sobre a ditadura militar brasileira". ContraCorrente: Revista de Estudos Literários e da Cultura (2): 23–42. ISSN 2525-4529.
- Santos, Clarissa Grahl dos (2014). "As esquerdas pelas direitas: memória sobre a luta armada e atuação política de direita em livros escritos por militares que atuaram em órgãos de repressão durante a ditadura civil-militar" (PDF). Anais do XV Encontro Estadual de História. Florianópolis: ANPUH-SC.

== See also ==
- Torture Never Again
- List of people killed by and disappeared during the Brazilian military dictatorship
- Securing Sex
- Sérgio Paranhos Fleury
- Ternuma
- Vladimir Herzog
