= Herbert de Souza =

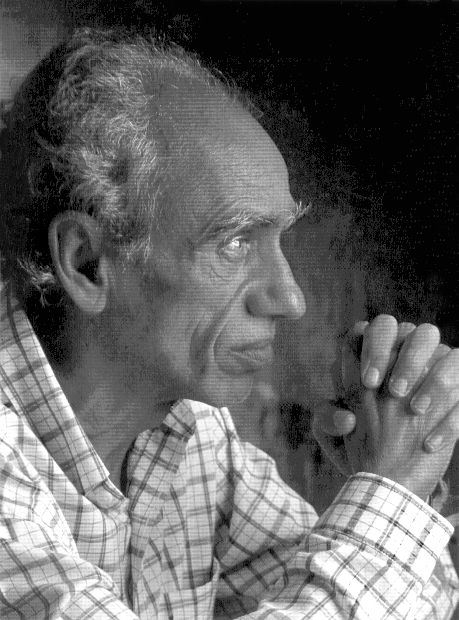
- Herbert de Souza (circa 1990)
- Born: November 13, 1935; Bocaiúva, Minas Gerais, Brazil
- Died: August 9, 1997 (aged 61); Rio de Janeiro, Brazil
- Other name: Betinho
- Occupation: Sociologist

Herbert Jose "Betinho" de Souza (November 13, 1935 – August 9, 1997) was a sociologist and activist against economic injustice and government corruption in Brazil and founder of the Brazilian Institute of Social Analysis and Economics (IBASE). In 1963, he became chief of staff in the Ministry of Education, but exiled himself after the military took power in the 1964 Brazilian coup d'état.

== Movements launched ==
In 1992, he launched Movement for Ethics in Politics, and in 1994, he started an annual drive, "Christmas Without Hunger". Most importantly, he was the leading figure in the foundation, in 1964, of the social and political organisation "Ação Popular" ("popular action"), a non-marxist leftist movement engaged in mobilizing the poor majority of the Brazilian population.

== Death ==
Sousa, as well as his brother Henfil, was hemophiliac. He contracted HIV and Hepatitis C through contaminated blood transfusions. He died on August 9, 1997 of complications of those diseases.

== Betinho Prize ==
The Betinho Prize is offered by the Association for Progressive Communications (APC) in the field of information and communication technologies (ICTs).

Says the APC: "The Internet has not yet been converted into a giant online shopping mall. There are thousands of projects big and small working online around the world that prove that the Internet can be, and is being, used as a powerful tool for development and social justice."

Its goal is to focus on "exceptional and sometimes little known initiatives". In 2003 and 2005 the Betinho Prize is offered in recognition of outstanding examples of ICT use specifically based in Latin America and the Caribbean.

Applications are accepted in some of the most widely used languages in the region—Spanish, Portuguese and English. In 2005, the last date for applying was October 16, 2005. This year's subject is "community connectivity projects for economic development".

== Contribution over HIV/AIDS issue ==
Betinho's contribution in the fight against the HIV/AIDS is considered to be immense. In an article, the general former-coordinator of the Abia, Jane Galvão, remembers some of the actions of the sociologist in this front: the creation of the Abia, a multidiscipline and multi-sectoral reply to HIV/AIDS; the pressure against the commerce of blood and its derivatives; and the fight for access to medicines.

According to some who appreciate his role, the eyes of Betinho were as "lighthouses that guided and illuminated ways to be trod". In a 1994 article, for example, Betinho anticipated one of the main trends of the HIV/AIDS epidemic in Brazil: its pauperisation.

== References in pop culture ==
- In "O bêbado e a equilibrista," an MPB hit composed by João Bosco and Aldir Blanc most notably recorded by Elis Regina in her 1979 album Elis, essa mulher: "My Brazil which dreams of the return of Henfil's brother," referring to Betinho.

== See also ==
- Global 500 Roll of Honour, awarded to Herbert de Souza in 1991
