= O Bêbado e a Equilibrista =

1979 single by Elis Regina

Single by Elis Regina

from the album Essa Mulher
- Language: Brazilian Portuguese
- Released: 1979
- Studio: Warner Elektra Atlantic
- Genre: Música popular brasileira
- Length: 3:47
- Composer: João Bosco
- Lyricist: Aldir Blanc
- Producers: Marco Mazzola and César Camargo Mariano

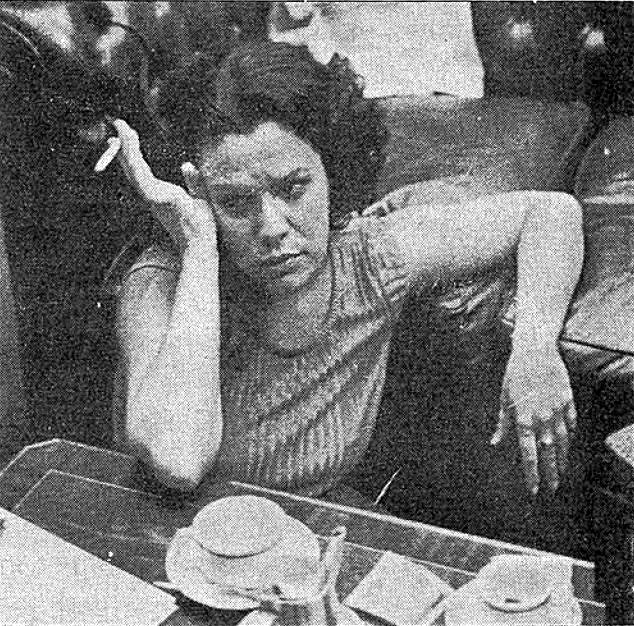
Singer Elis Regina being interviewed in 1979, around the time of the release of "O Bêbado e a Equilibrista"

"O Bêbado e a Equilibrista" ("The Drunk and the Tightrope Walker") is a Portuguese-language song written and composed by Brazilian musicians João Bosco and Aldir Blanc. It was performed by Elis Regina on her 1979 album Essa Mulher. It became a cultural touchstone in the period of amnesty and the decline of the Military Dictatorship in Brazil, and was called the "Amnesty Anthem" (Hino da Anistia). It called for the return of exiles and mourned the deaths of political prisoners, and was an anthem for protestors. It released shortly before the Amnesty Law of 1979, which pardoned the crimes both by the military regime and its opponents, and which allowed exiles to return to the country.

== History ==
The song did not begin with a political message, but as a melodic tribute to Charlie Chaplin. Chaplin died on December 25, 1977, and composer João Bosco began writing a samba inspired by the instrumental theme from Chaplin's film Modern Times (the theme later became known as the song "Smile"). Bosco played the samba for lyricist Aldir Blanc; around that time, Blanc had a conversation with the cartoonist Henfil and the composer Chico Mario about their brother, exiled activist Herbert de Souza (known as Betinho). Blanc was inspired by that conversation to collaborate with Bosco to use the samba as a basis for a song about "a Chaplin-esque character [the titular drunk] who, deep down, deplored the plight of exiles." ("um personagem chapliniano, que, no fundo, deplorasse a condição dos exilados."). Blanc added lyrics to Bosco's tune with the composer's blessing.

Elis Regina first performed the song on a television program in São Paulo, and became a hit before the single was released. It was the #1 song on the Brazilian Popular Music charts for 1979. She was the first Brazilian woman to achieve this.

The song became an anthem supporting amnesty for dissidents. Henfil credits the song with increasing turnout at demonstrations; he said "I called Betinho and said: now we have an anthem, and whoever has an anthem makes a revolution." ("Liguei para Betinho e disse: agora temos um hino, e quem tem um hino faz uma revolução.") Of the song's political impact, singer Regina said "Suddenly, it could be a little extra push in the matter. We can't miss opportunities; we have to fill the gaps." ("De repente pode ser um empurrãozinho a mais na questão. A gente não pode perder as chances, as brechas tem de ser ocupadas.")

The Amnesty Law was passed on August 28, 1979, and Bentinho returned to Brazil the following month after eight years of exile in Chile, Mexico, and Canada.

== Lyrics ==
The song begins with both a reference to Chaplin and to a tragedy: "The evening was falling like a viaduct / And a drunk wearing mourning clothes / Reminded me of Carlitos." ("Caía a tarde feito um viaduto / E um bêbado trajando luto / Me lembrou Carlitos"). Carlitos is the name given in Brazilian Portuguese to Charlie Chaplin's character known in English as The Tramp. The falling viaduct refers to the Viaduto da Paulo de Frontin, an overpass in Rio de Janeiro that collapsed in 1971, killing 29 people.

The lyrics reference three specific people connected to political struggle. One verse calls for the return of exiles: "My Brazil dreams of the return of Henfil's brother / Of so many people who left." ("Que sonha com a volta do irmão do Henfil / Com tanta gente que partiu.") The same verse hears "Marias and Clarices cry," ("Choram Marias e Clarices") referring to the families of political prisoners who died in the custody of Brazilian military intelligence: Maria, daughter of metalworker Manoel Fiel Filho, and Clarice Herzog, wife of journalist Vladimir Herzog. Both Filho and Herzog were accused of "suspected Communist activities", and were reported to have died by suicide, but were later revealed to have died from torture.

The song closes with an image of hope as a tightrope walker ("a esperança equilibrista"). Fernando Muratori Costa, a professor of history at the Federal University of Piauí, wrote a detailed analysis of the lyrics. He describes the drunk in the opening verses as an allegory for the Brazilian people, "mourning the repression... [and] walking the tightrope of the repressive regime.... However, since hope is the tightrope walker, it prevents the people from falling into complete despair." ("o povo brasileiro, de luto pela repressão... andando na corda bamba do regime repressor.... Contudo, como a esperança é a equilibrista, ela impede que o povo caia em total desalento.")

== Recording ==
Elis Regina's recording of "O bêbado e a equilibrista" was arranged by César Camargo Mariano.

=== Performers ===
- Elis Regina – vocals
- César Camargo Mariano – piano
- Paulinho Braga – drums
- Luizão – bass
- Ary Piassorollo – guitar
- Hélio Delmiro – guitar
- Cidinho - pandeiro
- Chiquinho – accordion
