= Saudades do Samba =

Studio album by Aline Wirley
- Released: 2 February 2009
- Recorded: 2014
- Genre: MPB; Samba
- Length: 37:14
- Language: Portuguese
- Label: Independent

Aline Wirley chronology
| Rouge discography (2002-2005) | Saudades do Samba (2009) | Indômita (2020) |

Saudades do Samba (transl. I Miss the Samba) is the debut album by Brazilian singer Aline Wirley, released in 2009. The work, inspired by Elis Regina and Chico Buarque and released by independent record label, focused on the roots of samba and MPB, leaving aside the old pop music that he performed. The album did not even have any song released for the radio, although "Sufoco" was featured on the soundtrack of the novel Mutantes: Promesas de Amor.

== Track listing ==
| No. | Title | Length |
|---|---|---|
| 1. | "Guerreira" | 3:44 |
| 2. | "Pout Pourri: Clara Nunes" | 3:33 |
| 3. | "Tô Voltando" | 3:38 |
| 4. | "Sufoco" | 3:24 |
| 5. | "Tristeza Particular" | 3:22 |
| 6. | "Uma Moeda" | 4:09 |
| 7. | "Não Diga Nada" | 4:25 |
| 8. | "Meu Amor Vai Com Você" | 3:38 |
| 9. | "Só Peço a Deus" | 3:35 |
| 10. | "Te Desejo Amor" | 3:46 |
| Total length: | | 34:09 |
