= Congregação Israelita Paulista =

Synagogue in São Paulo

São Paulo Hebrew Congregation
- Portuguese: Congregação Israelita Paulista
- Location of the synagogue in São Paulo

Religion
- Affiliation: Reform Judaism
- Rite: ties to the Conservative movement
- Ecclesiastical or organisational status: Synagogue
- Status: Active

Location
- Location: São Paulo
- Country: Brazil
- Coordinates: 23°33′14″S 46°39′36″W

Architecture
- Established: 1936 (as a congregation)
- Completed: 1936

Website
- cip.org.br (in Portuguese)

The São Paulo Hebrew Congregation (Portuguese: Congregação Israelita Paulista, abbreviated as CIP) is a Reform Jewish congregation and synagogue, with this to the Conservative movement, located in São Paulo, Brazil. It is the largest congregation in Latin America, serving more than 2,000 families. The congregation was established in 1936 by a group of refugees from Nazi Germany.

== History ==
CIP was founded in November 1936 by Rabbi Fritz Pinkuss. The origins of CIP are linked to the arrival of Jewish refugees from Nazi Germany in the 1930s. In response to increasing persecution in Europe, the Jewish community in Brazil established, in the early 1930s, the Assistance Commission for Jewish German Refugees (Comissão de Assistência aos Refugiados Israelitas da Alemanha, CARIA), which provided financial aid, employment assistance, and social support to newly arrived immigrants.

In 1934, a group of 40 young refugees supported by CARIA founded the São Paulo Hebrew Society (Sociedade Israelita Paulista, SIP), expanding communal, cultural, and educational activities. The organization offered courses, organized events, and published a bulletin with news about developments in Germany. Its facilities also hosted the first religious services conducted according to German Jewish tradition in São Paulo.

In October 1936, following the arrival of Rabbi Fritz Pinkuss from Heidelberg, a group of community members established Congregação Israelita Paulista as a formal religious congregation. On July 1, 1937, the institution inaugurated its first headquarters and held the dedication of its first Torah scroll in a ceremony conducted in Portuguese.

From its early years, CIP developed a range of social, educational, and religious initiatives. A social assistance department provided employment placement, financial aid, and legal support. In 1937, with support from the American Jewish Joint Distribution Committee, the congregation founded the Lar das Crianças, a child welfare institution that offered education, healthcare, and daily support to children of working families. That same year, CIP established its chevra kadisha and volunteer groups responsible for producing ritual garments.

Educational programs were organized under the direction of Rabbi Pinkuss, including courses in Jewish history, religion, Hebrew language, and literature, as well as Portuguese language and Brazilian history. In 1938, the community launched the newspaper Crônica Israelita (Hebrew Chronicle), which became a principal source of information for the Jewish community in São Paulo, particularly during the World War II.

Youth activities expanded in the late 1930s with the creation of organized programs that included outdoor activities and scouting, forming the basis of later movements such as the youth movement Avanhandava. In the 1940s, the congregation began organizing summer camps and youth programs, later consolidated in dedicated facilities in the city of Campos do Jordão.

In the postwar period, CIP expanded its institutional structure. In 1952, after affiliating with the São Paulo Hebrew Federation (Federação Israelita do Estado de São Paulo), the congregation initiated the construction of its new headquarters in the district of Consolação. Designed by architect Henrique Mindlin, the synagogue complex was inaugurated in 1957, followed by additional communal facilities.

During the 1950s and 1960s, youth movements were reorganized and expanded, including the establishment of Chazit Hanoar. The congregation also strengthened its Zionist orientation and began marking Israeli national commemorations such as Yom Ha'atzmaut. Cultural programming increased, with the participation of Israeli and international figures.

In the early 1970s, Rabbi Henry Sobel joined the congregation and played a prominent role in its religious and public life. In 1975, during Brazil’s military dictatorship, CIP gained national attention when Sobel challenged the official account of the death of journalist Vladimir Herzog, refusing to authorize his burial in a section designated for suicides. The subsequent interfaith memorial service at the São Paulo Cathedral became a landmark public event.

== Activism ==
The congregation has historically engaged in several types of political activism. Maria Luiza Tucci Carneiro of the University of São Paulo, wrote that the congregation "is seen as a space of resistance and memory because it initially welcomed German Jews, persecuted by Nazism, and later Italian Jews, persecuted by fascism. Then a resistance nucleus emerged that left a very important legacy in Brazilian culture". Following the death of Jewish journalist Vladimir Herzog during the Military dictatorship in Brazil in the 1970s, the congregation's chief rabbi Henry Sobel stood with interfaith leaders to denounce Herzog's murder by security forces.

== Leadership ==
The community is currently served by Rav Natan Freller, who is affiliated with the Rabbinical Assembly (Conservative movement). Hazzanim Avi Bursztein and Felipe "Pipo" Grytz serve as the community's liturgical cantors.

On October 22, 2026, CIP announced the addition of Rabbi Iehuda Gitelman to its rabbinate, starting in January 2027. Born in Argentina, Gitelman previously worked in Porto Alegre and in sister congregation Templo Beth-El in São Paulo before moving to Colombia, where he served as the leader of the Montefiore Congregation in Bogotá.

== See also ==
- History of the Jews in Brazil
- List of synagogues in Brazil
