= Brasil: Nunca Mais =

Book by Paulo Evaristo Arns

Brasil: Nunca Mais (Portuguese for Brazil: Never Again) is a book edited by Paulo Evaristo Arns in which episodes of torture under the military dictatorship in Brazil between 1964 and 1979 are documented. With the assistance of the Presbyterian minister Jaime Wright, Arns secretly photocopied the military government's records on torture and used them as his source. There is an English version of this book called Torture in Brazil: A Shocking Report on the Pervasive Use of Torture by Brazilian Military Governments, 1964-1979. It can be viewed as the Brazilian version of Argentina's Nunca Más Report released one year before.

In total, the book documents 17,000 victims, details 1,800 torture episodes and lists the names of 353 victims who were killed by the regime. Arns claims that, "Since the economic policy (Chicago economics) was extremely unpopular among the most numerous sectors of the population, it had to be implemented by force".

The book became later one of the largest data sources for the Brazilian National Truth Commission, basically for financial reparation, as it is not possible to legally charge any state member in Brazil for human rights crimes that occurred from 1961 until 1979 due to the 1979 Amnesty law. The book was kept secret for five years under the dictatorship, being published with the return to democracy. The book was a best seller and provoked a widescale movement for change. After its release, a Non-governmental organization called Tortura nunca mais ("Torture never again") was founded and began to monitor and denounce the presence of torture in Brazil.

== See also ==
- Human rights in Brazil
- DOI-CODI
- Sérgio Paranhos Fleury
