= Brazilian Military Criminal Code =

The military criminal code instituted under the military dictatorship in Brazil in the 1960s created military courts to try certain crimes committed by military personnel, in particular crimes against humanity committed at the order of the Brazilian executive. Critics say that cases transferred to these courts often languish, and note that nobody has ever suffered a penalty for any of the killings and disappearances of that period.

Given the prevalence of militarized police forces (Polícia Militar) in state-level law enforcement, human rights agencies have expressed concern that police impunity is in part responsible for the large numbers of police homicides. Brazilian police killed more than 6,400 people in 2022, according to Human Rights Watch.

== History ==
Military criminal law in Brazil dates back to the Empire of Brazil. The Brazilian imperial family organized the nation's first court, the Supreme Military and Justice Council, which later became the Superior Military Court (STM), currently headquartered in Brasília with jurisdiction nationwide. The current Military Penal Code (CPM) passed in 1969 under the military dictatorship that took power in the 1964 Brazilian coup d'état, covers members of the armed forces, Polícia Militar and military fire brigades, who must obey and respect military rules. The current Constitution of Brazil dates from 1988.

The Lei de Anistia of 28 August 1979 gave amnesty to everyone accused of committing political crimes during the dictatorship period, both political dissidents and military personnel, and in many respects amounted to "a form of self-amnesty for those involved in the repressive actions that took place during the dictatorship." No member of the military has been held responsible for crimes committed under the military dictatorship.

"Brazilian security forces have been repeatedly accused of systematic violations of human rights and of the existence of a system which guarantees the impunity of these violations. The Commission believes that there is indeed a history of abusive practices by the police..." wrote the inter-American Commission on Human Rights of the Organization of American States in 1997.

== Scope ==
Militarized police in Brazil carry out routine law enforcement duties at the state level and are responsible for keeping public order. Recent law-and-order crackdowns in the favelas of Rio de Janeiro have resulted in many police killings of young men in these neighborhoods. "The existence in Brazil of two different court systems—one civil and the other military—with varying legal proceedings and sentences for similar crimes committed by civilian police and the military police", wrote Jorge Zaverucha in 2022, constituted a "violation of the basic principle of equality before the law."

Law No. 13.491/17 adopted in 2017 by the Brazilian Chamber of Deputies modified Article 9 of the Military Criminal Code and expanded the jurisdiction of military courts to investigate actions ordered by the President of the Republic or the Ministry of State for Defence, and with respect to the security of military institutions.

== Human rights ==
The National Truth Commission named 377 state agents of whom almost 200 of them were still alive, in hundreds of cases of torture, killings, and enforced disappearance under the military dictatorship. President Jair Bolsonaro opposed the creation of the commission when he was a congressman and called the late torturer Carlos Brilhante Ustra a “hero.”

Brazil signed the International Convention for the Protection of All Persons from Enforced Disappearance, and passed legislation in consequence, Decree 8767 of May 11, 2016.

Military personnel do not have the right to strike, due to the fact that they carry weapons and a work stoppage could harm public order and the democratic rule of law, so technically this amounts to mutiny. according to article 142, item IV of the Constitution of Brazil and article 149 of the Brazilian Military Penal Code. While theoretically the militarized police are responsible to the governor of each states, illegal labor strikes have been used against governors, usually resulting in more crime.

The Brazilian military code imposes harsh penalties on members of the military who speak out, according to Human Rights Watch.

== See also ==
- Constitution of Brazil
