= Elis (1977 album) =

Studio album by Elis Regina
- Released: 1977
- Label: Philips
- Producer: César Camargo Mariano

Elis Regina chronology
Falso Brilhante (1976)	Elis (1977)	Transversal do Tempo (1978)

Elis is an album by Brazilian singer Elis Regina released in 1977, produced by César Camargo Mariano.

== Track listing ==
1. Caxangá (Milton Nascimento - Fernando Brant)
2. Colagem (Cláudio Lucci)
3. Vecchio Novo (José Márcio Pereira - Cláudio Lucci)
4. Morro Velho (Milton Nascimento)
5. Qualquer Dia (Vitor Martins - Ivan Lins)
6. Romaria (Renato Teixeira)
7. A Dama do Apocalipse (Crispin - Nathan Marques)
8. Cartomante (Vitor Martins - Ivan Lins)
9. Sentimental Eu Fico (Renato Teixeira)
10. Transversal do Tempo (Aldir Blanc - João Bosco)
