= Viva a Brotolândia =

Studio album by Elis Regina
- Released: 1961
- Recorded: 1961
- Genre: MPB
- Length: 29:48
- Label: Continental Records

Elis Regina chronology
Viva a Brotolândia (1961)	Poema de Amor (1962)

Viva a Brotolândia is the debut album by Brazilian singer Elis Regina. The album was released in 1961 by Continental Records.

== Track listing ==
1. "Dá Sorte"
2. "Sonhando" (Dreamin')
3. "Murmúrio"
4. "Tu Serás"
5. "Samba Feito Pra Mim"
6. "Fala-Me De Amor" (Take Me in Your Arms)
7. "Baby Face"
8. "Dor De Cotovelo"
9. "Garoto Último Tipo" (Puppy Love)
10. "As Coisas Que Eu Gosto" (My Favorite Things)
11. "Mesmo De Mentira"
12. "Amor, Amor"... (Love Love)
