= Poema de Amor =

Studio album by Elis Regina
- Released: 1962
- Recorded: 1962
- Genre: MPB
- Length: 29:48
- Label: Continental Records

Elis Regina chronology
Viva a Brotolândia (1961)	Poema de Amor (1962)	O Bem do Amor (1963)

Poema de Amor is the second album by Brazilian music superstar Elis Regina, It was released in 1962. It was her last album to be released by the Continental label, as around the time of its release she signed with Copacabana. The album was being recorded as early as January 21, 1962, with arrangements by maestro Renato de Oliveira.

== Track listing ==
1. "Poema" (Fernando Dias)
2. "Pororó-Popó" (João Roberto Kelly)
3. "Dá-me Um Beijo" (Armando Trovajoli, Dannell, Romeu Nunes (versão))
4. "Nos Teus Lábios" ('Ataliba Santos & Haroldo Eiras)
5. "Vou Comprar Um Coração" (Paulo Tito, Romeu Nunes)
6. "Meu Pequeno Mundo De Ilusão" (Bob Hilliard, José Mauro Pires (versão), Lee Pockriss)
7. "Las Secretárias" (Martha Almeida (versão), Pepe Luis)
8. "Saudade É Recordar" (Renan França, Verinha Falcão)
9. "Pizzicati-Pizzicato" (Fred Jorge (versão), Marnay, Stern)
10. "Canção De Enganar Despedida" (Joluz, Walter)
11. "Confissão" (Luiz Mergulhão, Paulo Aguiar, Umberto Silva)
12. "Podes Voltar" (Nazareno de Brito, Othon Russo)
