= Constitution of Brazil =

Constitution of the Federative Republic of Brazil
- First version of the Constitution of Brazil (1988)

Overview
- Original title: Constituição da República Federativa do Brasil
- Jurisdiction: Federative Republic of Brazil
- Presented: 22 September 1988; 38 years ago
- Ratified: 5 October 1988; 38 years ago
- System: Federal presidential constitutional republic

Government structure
- Branches: Three (executive, legislature, judiciary)
- Chambers: Bicameral: Chamber of Deputies and Federal Senate
- Executive: President of the Republic
- Judiciary: Supreme Federal Court
- Federalism: Federation
- Electoral college: No

History
- Amendments: 141
- Last amended: 16 October 2026
- Author: 1987–88 Constituent Assembly
- Signatories: Constituent Assembly
- Supersedes: 1967 Constitution of Brazil

The Constitution of the Federative Republic of Brazil or 1988 Federal Constitution (Portuguese: Constituição da República Federativa do Brasil ou Constituição Federal de 1988) is the supreme law of Brazil. It is the foundation and source of the legal authority underlying the existence of Brazil and the federal government of Brazil. It replaced the autocratic 1967 constitution capping 21 years of military dictatorship and establishing Brazil's current republic, often referred to as the New Republic. Made in the light of the Brazilian transition to democracy, it resignified the role of the state in the citizens' lives, providing a vast system of human and individual rights protection, social welfare, and democratic tools.

== Overview ==
The 1988 Brazilian Constitution is the seventh enacted since the country's independence in 1822, and the sixth since the proclamation of the republic in 1889. It was promulgated on 5 October 1988, after a two-year process in which it was written from scratch.

== History ==
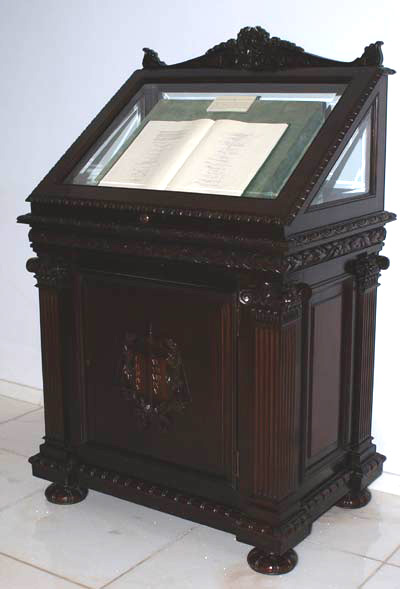
The original copy of the Constitution

The current Constitution of Brazil was drafted as a reaction to the period of military dictatorship, and sought to guarantee individual rights and restrict the state's ability to limit freedom, to punish offences and to regulate individual life. Among the new constitutional guarantees are the errand of injunction and the habeas data. It also anticipated the existence of a Consumers' Defence Code (enacted in 1990), of a Children's and Youth Code (1990) and of a new Civil Code (2002).

It was the first constitution to demand severe punishment for breaches of civil liberties and rights. Consequently, Brazil later approved a law making the propagation of prejudice against any minority or ethnic group an unbailable crime. This law provided legal remedy against those who spread hate speech or those who do not treat all citizens equally. This second aspect helped disabled people to have a reserved percentage of jobs in public service and large companies, and Afro-Brazilians to seek reparation for racism in court.

Breaking with the authoritarian logic of the previous Constitution, it made unbailable crimes those of torture and of actions directed against the democratic state and the constitutional order, thus creating constitutional devices to block coups d'état of any kind.

The Constitution also established many forms of direct popular participation besides regular voting, such as plebiscite, referendum and the citizens' initiative. Examples of these democratic mechanisms were the 1993 plebiscite concerning the form of government, where the presidential system was confirmed, and the 2005 firearms and ammunition referendum.

The mention of God in the preamble of the Constitution (and later on the Brazilian currency) was opposed by most leftists as incompatible with freedom of religion because it does not recognize the rights of polytheists such as some indigenous peoples or of atheists. The Supreme Federal Court has ruled that this commission of the protection of God was not unconstitutional since the preamble of the constitution is simply an indication of principles that serves as an introduction to the constitutional text and reflects the ideological conceptions of the legislator, falling within the scope of political ideology and not of the Law.

== Criticism ==
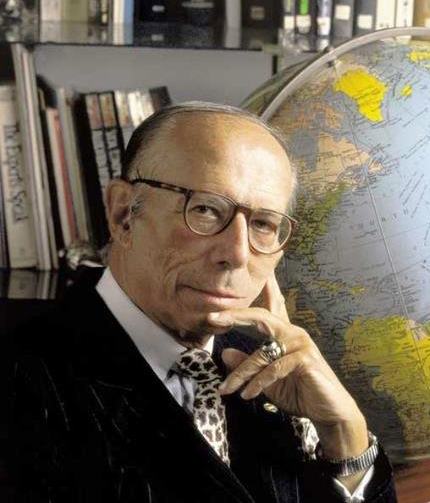
Roberto Campos, one of the few voices to rise up against the 1988 Constitution at the time of its creation

The Federal Constitution of 1988 is criticized in the doctrine for being very extensive, long-winded, and analytical. This characteristic forced the Constitution to be amended several times, in politically costly processes, to adapt to changes in society.

Another criticism is that the 1988 Federal Constitution reproduces a model of state capitalism, expanding state monopolies and regulations, which allowed the Brazilian state, in 2017, to have stakes in more than 650 companies, involved in one-third of the national GDP. This model also created restrictions for the performance of foreign companies in several fields with harmful consequences for the country's growth. In the view of some scholars, this economic model favors patrimonialism and corruption.

The Constitution is also responsible for creating a slow judicial system. Brazil has the 30th slowest judiciary among 133 countries, according to the World Bank. This has caused the judiciary to use provisional arrests as an advance of the sentence. In 2015, more than 40% of prisoners in Brazil were provisional.

A World Bank study criticized the 1988 Federal Constitution for extending the privileges of civil servants, aggravating income inequality in Brazil. Remuneration and retirement benefits are disproportionately high, according to studies. In 2015, the federal government's deficit associated with the retirement of the approximately 1 million government employees was greater than the total registered with 33 million private pensioners. According to the World Bank, civil servants are among the wealthiest fifth of the Brazilian population. For Roberto Brant, the Federal Constitution was captured by groups of civil servants in 1988. Philosopher Fernando Schüler maintains that Brazil went against the grain in the 1980s: "While the world tried to adjust the State to globalization and modernize public management, Brazil bet on a super bureaucratic state in the 1988 Constitution. We offer rigid stability in the employment for civil servants, we mix careers of State with common careers of the public service, we create the law of biddings, we cast the budgets and we eliminate any space for the meritocracy in the public area." For jurist Modesto Carvalhosa, only a new "principiological" constitution would end the privileges of the 1988 Constitution.

The Federal Constitution of 1988 is also criticized for having adopted one of the broadest Special Forums in the world, which jurists argue encourage corruption. A quarter of the actions with a Privileged Forum take more than ten years to be judged. The Supreme Federal Court takes 1,300 days to judge criminal actions by persons with privileged jurisdiction. Between 2001 and 2017, 200 actions involving the Privileged Forum expired.

Also criticized is the requirement of unappealable transit for the execution of the sentence. For Judge Sergio Moro, waiting for the final judgment will contribute to impunity. According to Minister Teori Zavascki after confirming a second sentence, one could no longer speak of the principle of non-culpability, since "the exceptional remedies, for the superimposition courts, do not boast the ability to review facts and evidence".

In the electoral aspect, the Constitution adopted the mandatory vote. Among the 15 largest economies in the world, Brazil is the only country in which voting is mandatory. A 2014 survey showed that the mandatory vote is rejected by 61% of Brazilians. Some question whether it is democratic to compel people to vote.

The Constitution adopted the social democratic model of State organization, as defined by the columnist for the newspaper O Estado de S. Paulo Luiz Sérgio Henriques. For professor and lawyer Marco Aurélio Marrafon, president of the Brazilian Academy of Constitutional Law, the 1988 Brazilian Magna Carta organized the State according to the Welfare State model, in which it is intended to reconcile "the liberal component of preservation of individual rights and limitation of state power, with direct economic intervention and the promotion of public policies, in order to redistribute resources and reduce social inequalities." In order to finance the Welfare State, it was necessary to raise the tax burden, which went from 23.4% of GDP in 1988, to 33.6% of GDP in 2005, and to link budget revenues. Thus, the Union reached 93% of mandatory spending in 2017, decreasing the room for maneuver by the government and affecting investments. This option is criticized by some.

Some criticize an alleged excessive power granted to the Order of Attorneys of Brazil by the Constitution. Brazilian philosopher and journalist Hélio Schwartsman considers that the 1988 Constitution conferred "disproportionate powers" on lawyers such as "appointing judges, writing laws, proposing direct actions of unconstitutionality, defining who can and who cannot become a lawyer". Roberto Campos, economist, ex-senator and Minister of Planning of Brazil in the early years of the military dictatorship noted that "The OAB has achieved the feat of being mentioned three times in what he defines as the "besteirol Constitution" of 1988. According to him, "it's perhaps the only case in the world where a club of professionals has enshrined the constitutional text."

== Contents ==
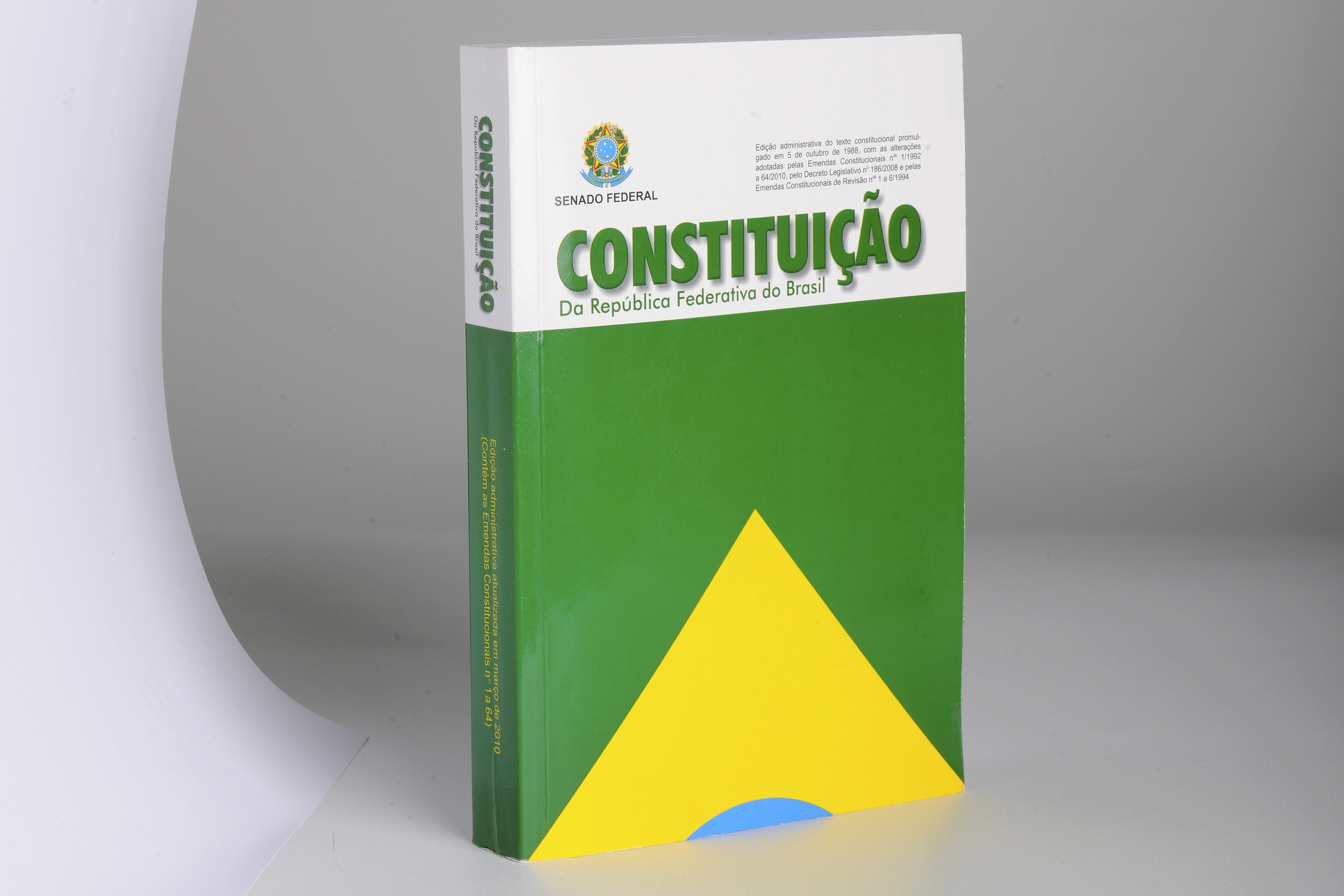
2017 edition of the Constitution

The Constitution of Brazil is composed of nine titles, subsequently divided into chapters and then articles. The articles are in turn divided into short clauses called incisos (indicated by Roman numerals) and parágrafos (indicated by numbers followed by §). The Constitution refers to the country as "the Union".

=== Preamble ===
The preamble to the Federal Constitution is a brief introductory statement that sets out the guiding purpose and principles of the document. The text reads:

We, the representatives of the Brazilian People, assembled in the National Constituent Assembly to institute a Democratic State for the purpose of ensuring the exercise of social and individual rights, liberty, security, well being, development, equality and justice as supreme values of a fraternal, pluralist and unprejudiced society, based on social harmony and committed, in the internal and international spheres, to the peaceful solution of disputes, promulgate, under the protection of God, this Constitution of the Federative Republic of Brazil.

=== Title 1 ===
Title 1 is devoted to the fundamental principles of the Union. It describes the States, the municipalities and the Federal District as the indissoluble constituents of the Union. It also establishes three independent, harmonic government branches: the Executive, the Legislative and the Judiciary, and lists the nation's main goals.

One of the most important excerpts from this title is in Article 1, single paragraph, stating:

All power emanates from the People, who exercise it through elected representatives or directly, under this Constitution.

=== Title 2 ===
Title 2 states the Fundamental Safeguards. It ensures basic rights to all citizens and foreigners residing in the Country, prohibits capital punishment, defines citizenship requirements, political rights, among other regulations.

=== Title 3 ===
Title 3 regulates the state organization. It establishes Brasília as the nation's capital, describes the rights and duties of the states, the municipalities, as well as rules for the public staff.

=== Title 4 ===
Title 4 is about the branches of government. It describes the attributes for every government branch, and the rules for amendments to the Constitution as well.

=== Title 5 ===
Title 5 regulates the defense of the State and its democratic institutions. It rules the deployment of the armed forces, the national security baselines, and declaration of state of emergency.

=== Title 6 ===
Title 6 comprises taxation and the nation's budget. It disposes on budget distribution among the Union's components and their competencies, and the nation's budget.

=== Title 7 ===
Title 7 regulates the economic activities in the country, the agricultural and urban policies, as well the state monopolies.

- The Constitution allows the Brazilian government to "expropriate, for the purpose of agrarian reform, rural property that is not performing its social function" (Article 184)
- According to Article 187, the social function is performed when rural property simultaneously meets the following requirements:
  - rational and adequate use;
  - adequate use of available natural resources and preservation of the environment;
  - compliance with the provisions which regulate labor relations; and
  - exploitation which favors the well-being of the owners and workers.

=== Title 8 ===
Title 8 is about the social order. It establishes the Social Security system, the Public Health system, the Public Pension system, among regulations concerning education, culture, science and technology, and sports policies.

=== Title 9 ===
Title 9 encompasses general constitutional dispositions. Among those, there are sparse regulations, as well as transitional dispositions.

== See also ==
- Brazilian Military Criminal Code
