= Wagner, Bahia =

Coordinates: 12°17′13″S 41°10′04″W

Wagner
- Municipality
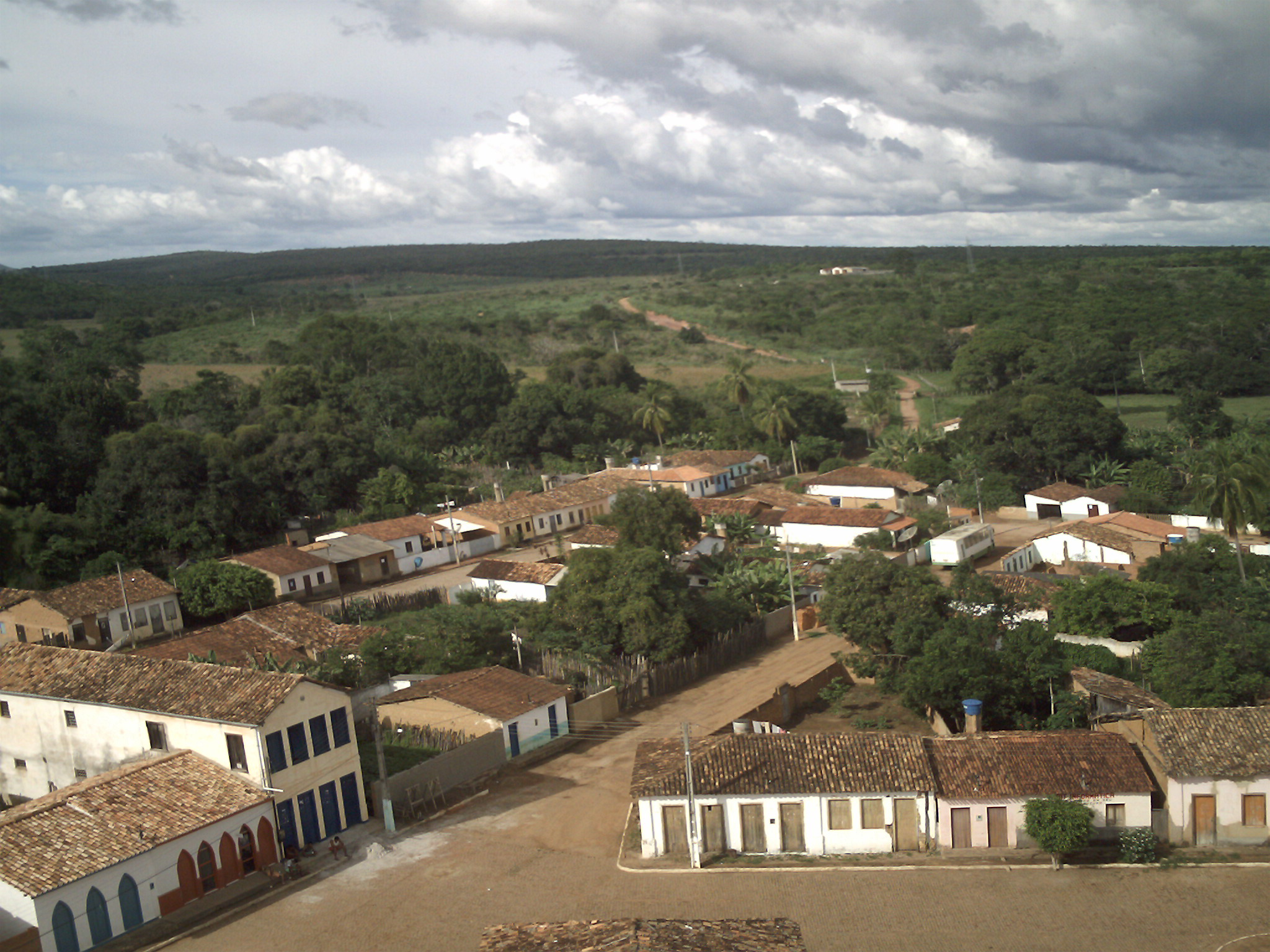

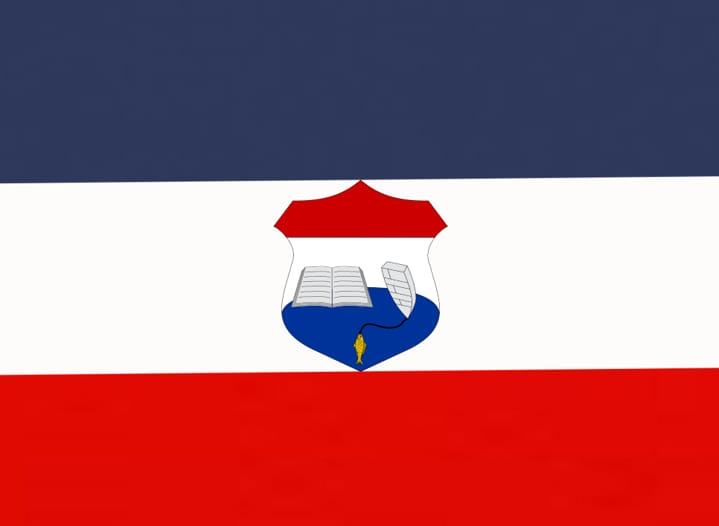
- Flag
- Interactive map of Wagner
- Country: Brazil
- Region: Nordeste
- State: Bahia

Population (2020)
  - Total: 9,344
- Time zone: UTC−3 (BRT)

Wagner is a municipality in the state of Bahia in the North-East region of Brazil.

== See also ==
- List of municipalities in Bahia
