= National Truth Commission =

Brazilian human rights investigation (2011–14)

- Commissão Nacional da Verdade
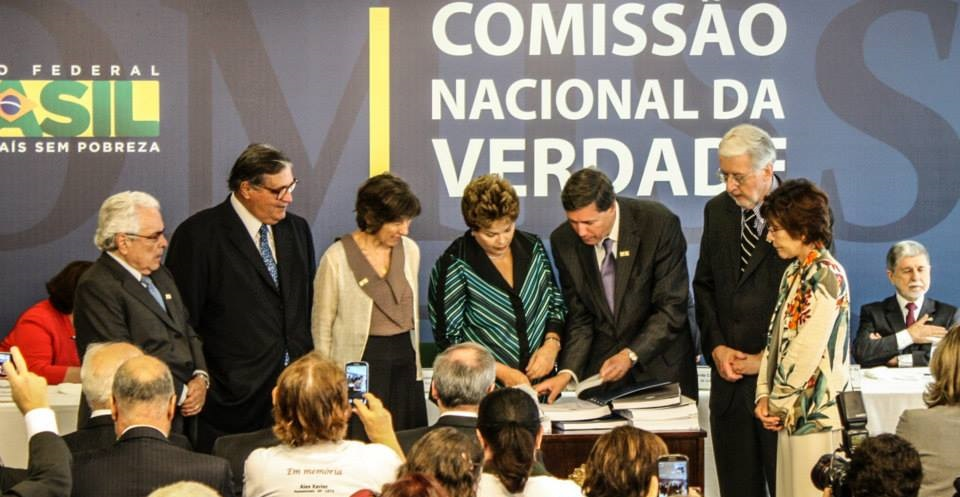
- The National Truth Commission delivers their final report to President Dilma Rousseff on 10 December 2014
- Abbreviation: CNV
- Established: 18 November 2011; 14 years ago
- Founded at: Brasília, Federal District
- Dissolved: 16 December 2014; 11 years ago
- Key people: Claudio Fonteles; Gilson Dipp; José Carlos Dias; José Paulo Cavalcante Filho; Maria Rita Kehl; Paulo Sérgio Pinheiro; Rosa Maria Cardoso da Cunha
- Website: cnv.memoriasreveladas.gov.br

In Brazil, the National Truth Commission (Portuguese: Comissão Nacional da Verdade) investigated human rights violations of the period of 1946–1988 – in particular by the authoritarian military dictatorship that ruled Brazil from April 1, 1964 to March 15, 1985.

The commission lasted for two years and consisted of seven members. Members of the commission had access to all government files about the 1946–1988 period and could convene victims or people accused of violations for testimony; although it wasn't mandatory for them to attend.

On 10 December 2014, the commission issued a report with its findings. The report identified the participation of 337 agents of Brazilian government involved in human rights violations, including arbitrary prisons, forced disappearings, torture and subsequent death of political opponents to the dictatorship. According to the report, 434 people were killed or disappeared by actions of the military regime, together with over 8,300 across the indigenous people. The Truth Commission admits that the real figure of indigenous people killed is probably much higher.

== History of Brazil's military regime ==
From 1964 to 1985 Brazil fell under the influence of a military regime that killed or "disappeared" political activists and trade unionists and tortured many others. The numbers of those killed and "disappeared" are smaller than those of neighboring countries like Argentina, which also fell to military dictatorships. Brazil's military regime ruled Brazil by rotating military presidents, held elections, and kept Congress open. However, in reality, the elections held were heavily manipulated and the military openly threatened Congress if it began to operate against the views and wishes of the regime. In 1979 the Brazilian government passed an amnesty law that allowed all exiled activists to return to Brazil but also protected officials involved in the military regime from any prosecution for human rights violations committed prior to 1979. Because of this law, no military perpetrators of crimes have been tried and convicted for their offenses. As 1985 began to unfold, the regime began to slowly and peacefully transfer governmental power to civilians, avoiding a tumultuous end that might instigate negative feelings about the regime or aggressive prosecution of any leaders of the military. This chapter of Brazil's past created what researcher Nina Schneider describes as a "politics of silence", where atrocities and entire decades of Brazil's history have been swept under the carpet.

=== Brazil: Nunca Mais ===
In 1985 the Archdiocese of São Paulo headed by Archbishop Cardinal Paulo Evaristo Arns and supported by the World Council of Churches published a report called Brasil: Nunca Mais (Brazil: Never Again, or Torture in Brazil) about the widespread use of torture during Brazil's military regime. Working from 1979–1982, while the military was still in power, lawyers and other researchers sought to investigate to what extent the regime used torture as a form of punishment for their political opponents, secretly copying documents from military trial transcripts from 1964–1979 and gathering testimony from political prisoners. The report's publication and release was delayed until after March 1985 to ensure that a new civilian president and government were in place. This project did not have an official mandate, although unofficially one of the participants said that they were working to preserve the military records and inform society about the abuses suffered by Brazilians under the dictatorship. The report concluded that the military regime used torture in its judicial system, and that judicial authorities knew that these torture methods were taking place to elicit confessions. Its recommendations for Brazil were vague, calling Brazilians to ensure "that the violence, the infamy, the injustice, and the persecution of Brazil’s recent past should never again be repeated", and that citizens should be able to participate in politics to ensure that the government is held accountable for its actions. This report, however, failed to effect much change in Brazil as the 1979 Amnesty law protected the perpetrators of human rights violations during the regime and the project never had any governmental backing to legitimize it.

== Before the Commission ==
=== Special Commission on Political Deaths and Disappearances ===
In 1995 Law No. 9.410, known as the Law of the Disappeared, allowed for the creation of a Special Commission on Political Deaths and Disappearances (the CEMDP), established and installed in the Ministry of Justice of Brazil and sanctioned by the president of Brazil, Fernando Henrique Cardoso.

This law marks the first time that the State accepted responsibility for the illicit acts of the military regime, including kidnapping, torture, imprisonment, forced disappearance, murder, and violations against foreigners living in Brazil. With this law came the option for families affected by the illicit activities of the military regime to request the death certificates of those disappeared and receive compensation. After this law came into effect, another commission was tasked with investigating deaths that were politically motivated while in police custody.

Many families criticized this law because it did not mandate the State to identify and hold responsible the perpetrators of those criminal acts, and because the burden of proof was placed on the families of victims. Additional complaints were founded on the fact that due to the Amnesty Law, the state could not examine the circumstances of the deaths. These families also disapproved of the state treating deaths like they were only family issues, not ones of society, since only family members of victims could file requests for acknowledgement of State responsibility. After eleven years of work, the CEMDP had disbursed nearly 40 million reais to the families of more than 300 persons killed by the military regime, with the average payment coming to approximately 120,000 reais, almost 120,000 dollars at the exchange rate of the time. In addition to these reparations, the CEMDP in September 2006 began collecting blood samples from families of people killed during the regime to create a DNA database to identify the remains of victims.

In 2007, during the second term of President Luiz Inácio Lula da Silva, the book Direito à memória e à verdade (Right to memory and to truth) was published. This book outlined the results of eleven years of labor by the CEMDP, serving as the first official report by the Brazilian State to directly accuse members of the military for crimes such as torture, dismemberment, decapitation, rape, concealing bodies, and murder. Paulo Vannuchi, one of the authors of Brazil: Nunca Mais, helped to complete this book. This book proved that the majority of opponents to the military regime were arrested, tortured, and killed, and was highly critical of the amnesty awarded to military officials. This book called military officials and those involved in illicit acts to uncover the truth of what happened during the regime.

=== Subsequent truth and justice projects ===
Since 2007, memorials titled "Indispensable People" have been erected around Brazil, helping to restore some of the history of those political dissidents who died during the military regime. On 22 September 2009, the Memorial da Resistência de São Paulo (Resistance Memorial) was inaugurated in the building that previously hosted the Departamento de Ordem Política e Social (State Department of Social and Political Order, DEOPS), an infamous torture and assassination center. The Resistance Memorial is one of the most important transitional justice initiatives in Brazil, possessing an extensive archive and the mandate to preserve the history of contemporary political struggles in the country.

The federal government of Brazil in May 2009 launched the online project "Revealed Memories", also known as the "Reference Center for the Political Struggles in Brazil (1964-1985)". This reference center makes available information to the public about the political history of Brazil, and is run under the supervision of the National Archives, an organization that reports directly to the Office of the Chief of Staff of the Presidency of the Republic.

== 1979 Amnesty Law ==
In 1979, Brazil passed a law which granted amnesty for political crimes and crimes with a political nexus committed by members of the armed forces or member of the government between 2 September 1961 and 15 August 1979.

Recently, a western human rights court and Brazilian lawyers ordered Brazil to overturn the 1979 amnesty law so the perpetrators could be prosecuted in the criminal court. However Brazil still declined to overturn the law, perhaps meaning a change to this law in the near future is unlikely. Although international pressure wants the law overturned, supreme court chairman Cezar Peluso says, "If it’s true that every people, according to its own culture, solves its own historical problems in its own manner, then Brazil has chosen the way of harmony." However journalist Fernando Rodriguez stated it's more of a, "fear to lay hands on the shameful episodes of the past".

In April 2010, in a controversial ruling, the Brazilian court upheld the use of the amnesty law during the military regime. However, a few months later in November 2010, the Inter American Court of Human Rights found in the Gomez Lund case that the amnesty law was not compatible with the American Convention, meaning that the law lacked legal effect and therefore should not be an obstacle in the prosecution of the human rights abuses. Marking a crucial moment in Brazil's history, the federal courts launched an investigation into a past human rights violation. On 24 March 2012, federal prosecutors charged Colonel Carlos Alberto Brilhante Ustra and Police Chief Dirceu Garvina, with the kidnapping of a union leader Aluzio Palhano Pedreira Ferreira in 1971. Although the amnesty law would normally come into play here, the absence of the victim, makes it so the crime is deemed to continue beyond 1979 and thus not covered by the amnesty. Even with the amnesty law, prosecutors are starting to find "loopholes" in the law. With increasing international pressure on this law, it will be interesting to see how this unfolds.

The Amnesty Law, organized into five chapters (which was considered highly satisfactory by the victims of political persecution) guarantees the following amnesty rights: the declaration of the status of political amnesty recipient; financial reparations; assurance, for all official purposes, that the period of time in which they were forced to stop their professional activities due to punishment or threat of punishment will count as valid; the conclusion of courses interrupted due to punishment or the validation of diplomas obtained by those who completed courses at teaching institutes outside the country; and the right to reinstatement for punished civil servants and public employees. In the sole paragraph of article 1, the law guarantees those who were removed from their jobs by administrative cases, based on emergency legislation, without the right to contest the case or defend themselves, and prevented from knowing the motives and grounds for the decision, reinstatement to their positions (due to the age of the claimants, this reinstatement has occurred, in practice, in retirement).

The law also lists in detail all the punishments that entitle victims to the status of recipients of political amnesty, and it states that financial reparations, provided for in chapter III, may be paid in two different ways: in a single installment, consisting of the payment of 30 times the minimum monthly wage per year of punishment for those who cannot prove an employment relationship, and whose value may not, under any circumstances, exceed 100,000 reais; or in permanent and continuous monthly installments, guaranteed to those who can prove an employment relationship. According to the law, each victim of political persecution has the right to receive the outstanding amounts up until five years before the date of their request claiming amnesty.

== Comissão Nacional da Verdade ==
=== Formation of the Commission ===
The commission was proposed by the 3rd National Human Rights Program, a set of bills proposed by then President Luiz Inácio Lula da Silva in December 2009. However, Lula dropped the truth commission proposal after members of the military threatened resignation. Since then, its text was changed several times, mainly to address the complaints of the military, who feared a review of the Amnesty Law. Most notably, the term "political repression" was abolished from the bill's text. Since the commission will not have punitive powers against officers accused of torture, it was criticized by human rights activists as a non-contribution for justice. They also claim that the commission will have a very short term and not enough members to complete their work satisfactorily. The military, on the other hand, complain that they will not be represented on the commission, which may not give due weight to crimes committed by leftist organizations.

=== Structure of the Commission ===
The Commission consists of 7 commissioners and an additional 14 employees. The commissioners include Gilson Dipp, José Carlos Dias, José Paulo Cavalcantí Filho, Maria Rita Kehl, Paulo Sérgio Pinheiro, Pedro Dallari, and Rosa Maria Cardoso da Cunha. The commission has significant power in order to ascertain the factual and social truths of the nation's military dictatorship: it "can receive voluntarily provided information in the form of testimonies, data, and documents; solicit information from public entities and organs; convoke persons for interviews or testimonies; authorize enquiries to collect or recover information; hold public hearings; request witness protection; partner with public or private, national or international organs and organizations to exchange information and demand assistance from public entities and organs." The commission's goals for reconciliation focus on documenting the truth and promoting restorative justice. It hopes to help victims, find bodies of the disappeared, establish the policies and actions of the dictatorship, and recommend measures to prevent further human rights violations. Although the Commission has been given the appropriate powers to ascertain information, it is questionable if it will be able to achieve its goals due to resistance in Brazil, particularly on the part of the military.

=== Financial reparations ===
The amnesty bill put into place in 1979, stated in article 11 that "This Law, beyond the rights expressed herein, does not generate any others, including those relating to remuneration, payments, salaries, income, restitution, dues, compensation, advances or reimbursements." The law did not allow any reparations in any of the mentioned forms. Then in 2001, Fernando Henrique Cardoso passed a bill allowing financial compensation to those whose work was impeded by the military dictatorship. In 2009 the Brazilian Justice Ministry awarded 142,000 reals, or 71,000 us dollars to 44 farmers each, as well as about 465 us dollars a month. When announcing the reparation payments Justice Minister Tarso Genro stated "This is a formal request for forgiveness by the Brazilian Government." However, offering reparations to 44 Brazilian farmers does not even begin to compensate for the human rights violations perpetrated by the military dictatorship. In 1996, the Dossier on the Missing and Assassinated originally published in 1984 by the Brazilian Committee for Amnesty, Rio Grande do Sul section, was updated referring to 217 victims of assassination and 152 victims of forced disappearance by state agents. However, Law 9,140, a law allowing financial compensation to victim's families, only recognized 130 victims of forced disappearance and none of assassination. Outside of major cases of reparations, the Brazilian government has provided financial compensation in 12,000 cases from 1995 to 2010.

=== Current developments ===
After signing the law, Rousseff initially made little progress with the Truth Commission. Due to objections from both the military and human rights activists, Rousseff at first stepped back from the Truth Commission she signed into law in November 2011. Nearly half a year after the formation of the commission, no commissioners had been appointed. However, the commission eventually began with its inauguration in May 2013. The inauguration featured the introduction of the seven commissioners and a speech by President Rousseff, in which she declared the event a "celebration of the transparency of truth." Since the inauguration in May 2012, the truth commission has held fifteen public hearings across nine states in Brazil. In July 2013, the commission reported on their accomplishments in their first year of existence. In a televised press conference, truth commissioner Paulo Sérgio Pinheiro detailed the year's successes. In particular, he mentioned that the commission's information comes from three primary sources: archives of intelligence operations that existed during the military dictatorship, testimonies of suspects and surviving victims, and other documents supplied by the government of Brazil. Furthermore, this emphasis on collecting factual and forensic truth has led to several significant findings of the commission. The first is that the use of torture was not only employed towards the end of the military dictatorship, but had been used as a common technique in interrogation as early as 1964. Additionally, the commission has established that the state of Brazil concealed information regarding missing persons. While the commission took time to gain enough political support and fulfill the requirements of the mandate, there have been significant developments in the formation of a national truth in Brazil over the course of the last year.

== Parallel mechanisms for transitional justice in Brazil ==
=== Regional Truth Commissions ===
As the national Truth Commission seemed to be at a virtual standstill in the beginning of 2012, the São Paulo state assembly decided to form an independent Truth Commission. The commission is composed of five commissioners who will investigate human rights abuses that occurred during the military dictatorship and offer a report in 2015. Officially called the Rubens Paiva State Truth Commission (named after disappeared congressman Rubens Paiva) the commission hopes to contribute to "a nation-wide mobilization around the cause of memory, truth, and justice." Since the formation of the São Paulo truth commission, other states have followed their example. A member of the house subcommittee on the national truth commission, Erika Kokay, argued in favor of the urgency expressed by the states’ initiatives for these regional commissions: "This country cannot bear to wait. Brazil has to know the truth." The various truth commissions are designed to report to and cooperate with the efforts of the national truth commission, despite their ability to conduct their own investigations.

=== Human rights trial ===
In December 2013, the case regarding the disappearance of Edgar de Aquino Duarte became the first criminal trial of state security agents Carlos Alberto Brilhante Ustra, Carlos Augusto, and Alcides Singello. The victim vanished in 1973 after being held and tortured at special intelligence offices in São Paulo. Punitive justice has traditionally been challenging to accomplish in Brazil due to the amnesty law of 1979 and the subsequent upholding of this law by Brazil's supreme court. The ministry of public affairs has been able to make the claim that cases such as that of Edgar de Aquino Duarte are exempt from the 1979 amnesty law because the victim is still missing, making the forced disappearance an ongoing crime. While the amnesty law has prevented criminal trials in Brazil in the past, interpretations of the amnesty law may change as the impunity of Brazil's human rights violators crumbles.

== Torture allegations prior to the dictatorship ==
On January 11, 2013, the Comissão Nacional da Verdade (CNV) released its first torture allegation from outside the military dictatorship, during the government of Getúlio Vargas. Eighty-four-year-old Boris Tabacof, former Secretary of Finance of Bahia, former director of the Safra Group and current president of the Board of Directors of Suzano, denounced the torture he suffered in November 2012 to several members of the commission: Maria Rita Kehl, José Carlos Dias and Paulo Sérgio Pinheiro. Tabacof's testimony covered his torture, illustrating his arrest on October 20, 1952 and subsequent 400-day imprisonment. Tabacof's testimony also illustrated a significant human rights violation that occurred in Brazil during the Estado Novo period (1937-1945). Despite the nature of Tabacof's testimony, the CNV's mandate only covers issues from between 1964 and 1988, preventing any further investigation of the claim.

== See also ==
- Brazilian Military Criminal Code
