= Securing Sex =

2016 book by Benjamin Cowan

Securing Sex: Morality and Repression in the Making of Cold War Brazil
- Author: Ben Cowan
- Language: English
- Genre: Non-Fiction
- Published: 2016
- Publisher: University of North Carolina Press
- Publication place: United States
- ISBN: 978-1-4696-2750-2

Securing Sex: Morality and Repression in the Making of Cold War Brazil is a book by Benjamin A. Cowan published by the University of North Carolina Press in 2016. It discusses how the right-wing activist, attitude, and government during the Cold War caused a transnational network of repressive laws and attitudes. The book also discusses how this "moral panic" made villains out of Communist and equating them to sexual deviants and queer people.

== Synopsis ==
Benjamin Cowan explores the repression that existed during mid Cold War Brazil and beyond. He discusses how the Right Wing activist use the military regime in Brazil to spread a very "modest" and "morally correct" population, attitudes, and laws. Cowan tackles this subject by using the voices and perspectives of Right Wing activist. Cowan uses records from unused archives, something that people have not been doing. Cowan also attributes these attitudes to current perspectives of sexually liberate people, women, and queer people. Cowan uses some of the chapters to his advantage. He poses a question as the chapter title and in the next chapter he answers it. (Chapter 2: Sexual Revolution? and Chapter 3: Sexual Revolution!). He also goes through the years of the military dictatorship in relation to the certain topic of women being used as a tool to turn against rebels and how young men were seen as heroes.

== Critical reception ==
Securing Sex was extremely well received by academics, especially Brazil experts. Most reviews comment on the use of Right wing perspectives and how it is "extremely balanced". Bryan McCann begins his review as saying that Cowan's work is a "major contribution to our understanding of the Brazilian military dictatorship of 1964 to 1985".

== Awards ==
Securing Sex won the 2017 Brazil Section Award from the Latin American Studies Association.
