= Carlos Brilhante Ustra =

Brazilian colonel and chief of torture during the military dictatorship

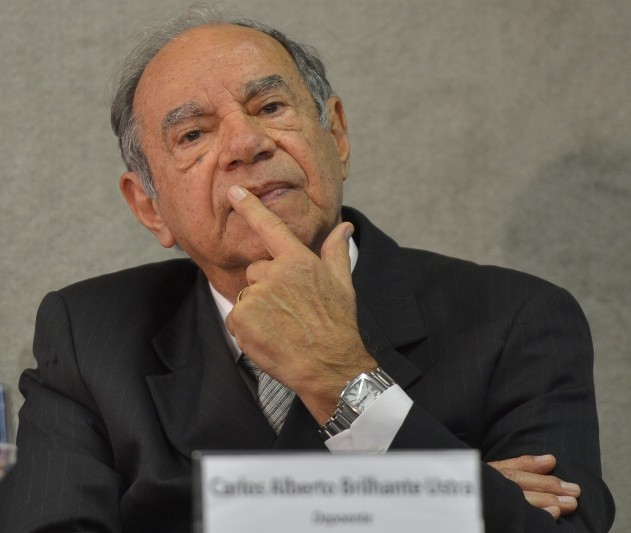
- Ustra in 2013

Personal details
- Born: Carlos Alberto Brilhante Ustra; 28 July 1932 Santa Maria, Rio Grande do Sul, Brazil
- Died: 15 October 2015 (aged 83) Brasília, Brazil
- Nickname: Dr. Tibiriçá

Military service
- Allegiance: Brazil
- Branch: Brazilian Army
- Rank: Colonel
- Commands: DOI-CODI

Carlos Alberto Brilhante Ustra (Brazilian Portuguese: [ˈkaʁluz awˈbɛʁtu bɾiˈʎɐ̃tʃi ˈustɾɐ]; 28 July 1932 – 15 October 2015) was a Brazilian army officer, politician and known and convicted torturer who served as a colonel in the Brazilian Army.

== Biography ==
Born in Santa Maria, Rio Grande do Sul, Ustra was the head of the DOI-CODI, an investigation division of the Second Army from 1970 to 1974. He became known by the codename Dr. Tibiriçá. While head of DOI-CODI, 47 people officially died, although further investigation attributed 502 tortures to the division under his administration.

In 2008, Ustra became the first military official to be recognized, by a civil court in São Paulo, as a torturer during the dictatorship. He continued to be politically active in military clubs, in defense of the military dictatorship and anticommunist critics.

He died at the age of 83 on 15 October 2015 of pneumonia caused by multiple organ failure after several weeks in hospital in Brasília.

== Legacy ==
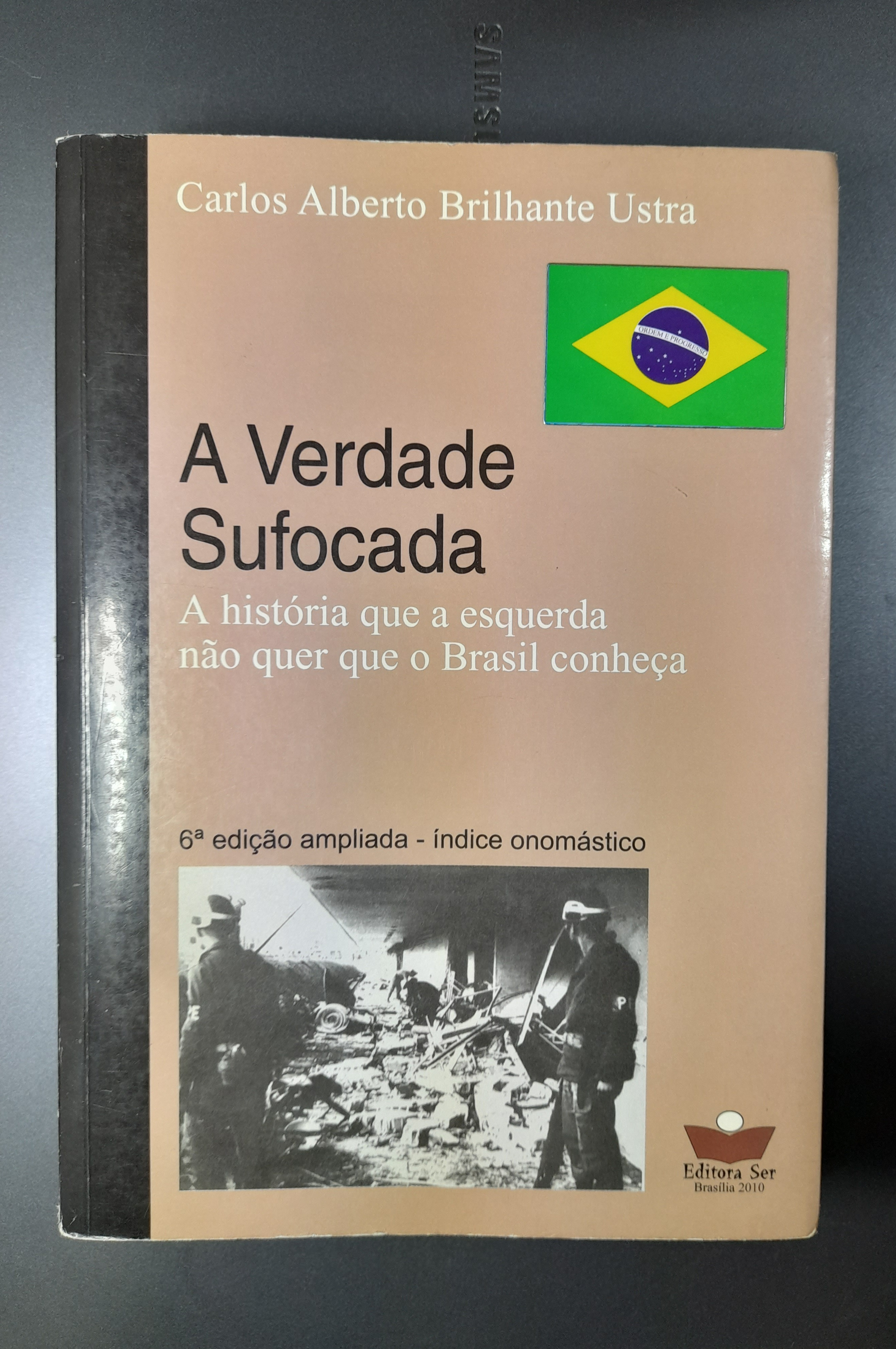
The book

Ustra has been praised on multiple occasions by the former president of Brazil Jair Bolsonaro. On 17 April 2016, during the voting of the impeachment of Dilma Rousseff in the Chamber of Deputies, Ustra was praised by then-deputy Bolsonaro in a speech before casting his vote, calling him "the dread of Dilma Rousseff". Rousseff, who was tortured at DOI-CODI, commented on Bolsonaro's tribute saying: "I was arrested in the 1970s. In fact, I knew the man he referred to well. He was one of the biggest torturers in Brazil, [...] It's terrible to see someone voting in honor of the greatest torturer Brazil has known." On 8 August 2019 Bolsonaro, by then president, called him a "national hero" who "prevented Brazil from falling into what the left-wing wants today".

The Brazilian Government makes a R$15.307,90 monthly payment to Ustra's daughters.

== Works ==
- Rompendo o Silêncio (1974)
- A Verdade Sufocada (2006) − a memoir book about the military dictatorship in Brazil.
