= Henry Sobel =

Reform rabbi from Brazil (1944–2019)

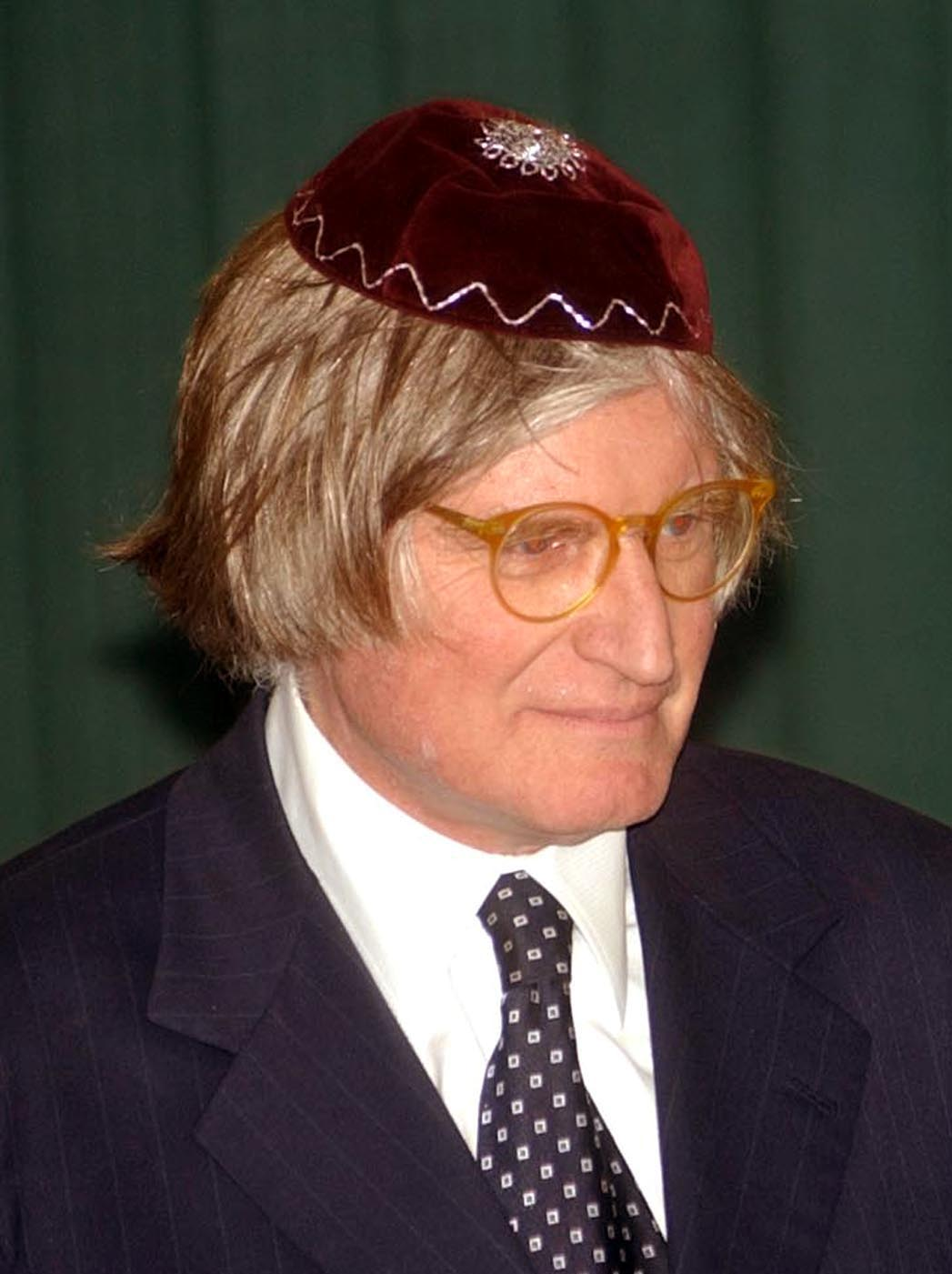
- Sobel in 2006
- Born: Henry Isaac Sobel; 9 January 1944; Lisbon, Portugal
- Died: 22 November 2019 (aged 75); Miami, Florida, U.S.
- Occupation: Rabbi

Henry Isaac Sobel (9 January 1944, in Lisbon – 22 November 2019, in Miami) was a Portuguese-American Reform rabbi, and was president of the Congregação Israelita Paulista (CIP), a major Jewish congregation in São Paulo, Brazil.

== Biography ==
Son of Ashkenazi Jews who fled the Nazi persecution during the World War II (Belgian mother and Polish father), Sobel was born in Lisbon, Portugal. While he was an infant his family moved to New York City where he grew up and was eventually ordained a reform rabbi in 1970. In the same year, he accepted an invitation to be the rabbi at Congregação Israelita Paulista and established himself in São Paulo, Brazil. In his own words, it "made possible my actuation in the social and politic fronts and gave me the chance of engaging myself". As of 2007, he had two colleagues sharing the rabbinate, Rabbi Michel Schlesinger and Rabbi Yehuda Busquila. During the 1970s and 1980s Sobel had an extraordinary role in protecting the human rights in Brazil (at that time governed by the military). Along with Catholic Cardinal Paulo Evaristo Arns and others, Sobel showed great courage in denouncing the assassination of journalist Vladimir Herzog by right wing military in Brazil.

He had also a great role in promoting inter-religious dialogue in Brazil and elsewhere by cultivating excellent relations with Catholic dignitaries, including the Pope John Paul II. During more than 30 years, Sobel was recognized as an informal leader of the reform Jewish community in São Paulo.

Sobel has one daughter, Alisha, born in São Paulo in 1983.

== U.S. arrest and hospitalization ==
On March 23, 2007, Sobel was arrested in Palm Beach, Florida, accused of shoplifting US$680 worth of neckties. He was released on a $3,000 bail and returned to São Paulo. He initially denied the accusations and then requested a suspension from his position at CIP.

On March 30, Sobel was admitted to Hospital Israelita Albert Einstein. According to the doctors, due to "an episode of mood disorder, represented by a lack of emotional control and altered behavior." The hospital also reported that he had been taking large quantities of drugs to treat severe insomnia that "cause potential states of mental confusion and amnesia." On April 2, Sobel gave a brief press conference at the hospital. "I don't know where to start," he began. "I am taking relatively strong medications. Regarding what happened, it is very hard for me to explain the inexplicable. I do not have scientific and psychological knowledge to understand, explain and, much less, justify what occurred, but one thing I know: the Henry Sobel who committed that act is not the Henry Sobel you know." He ended saying: "I want to close with an apology, and I also want to make a commitment. I want to apologize for the distress that I caused, especially for having taken medication without a medical prescription. I want to apologize for the distress that I caused everybody, and I want to make a solemn commitment: I intend to keep on defending all the moral and ethical values that I have always stood up for, as a Jew, a man and a rabbi."

== Death ==
Sobel died of cancer on 22 November 2019, in Miami, Florida.
