= Henfil =

Brazilian cartoonist

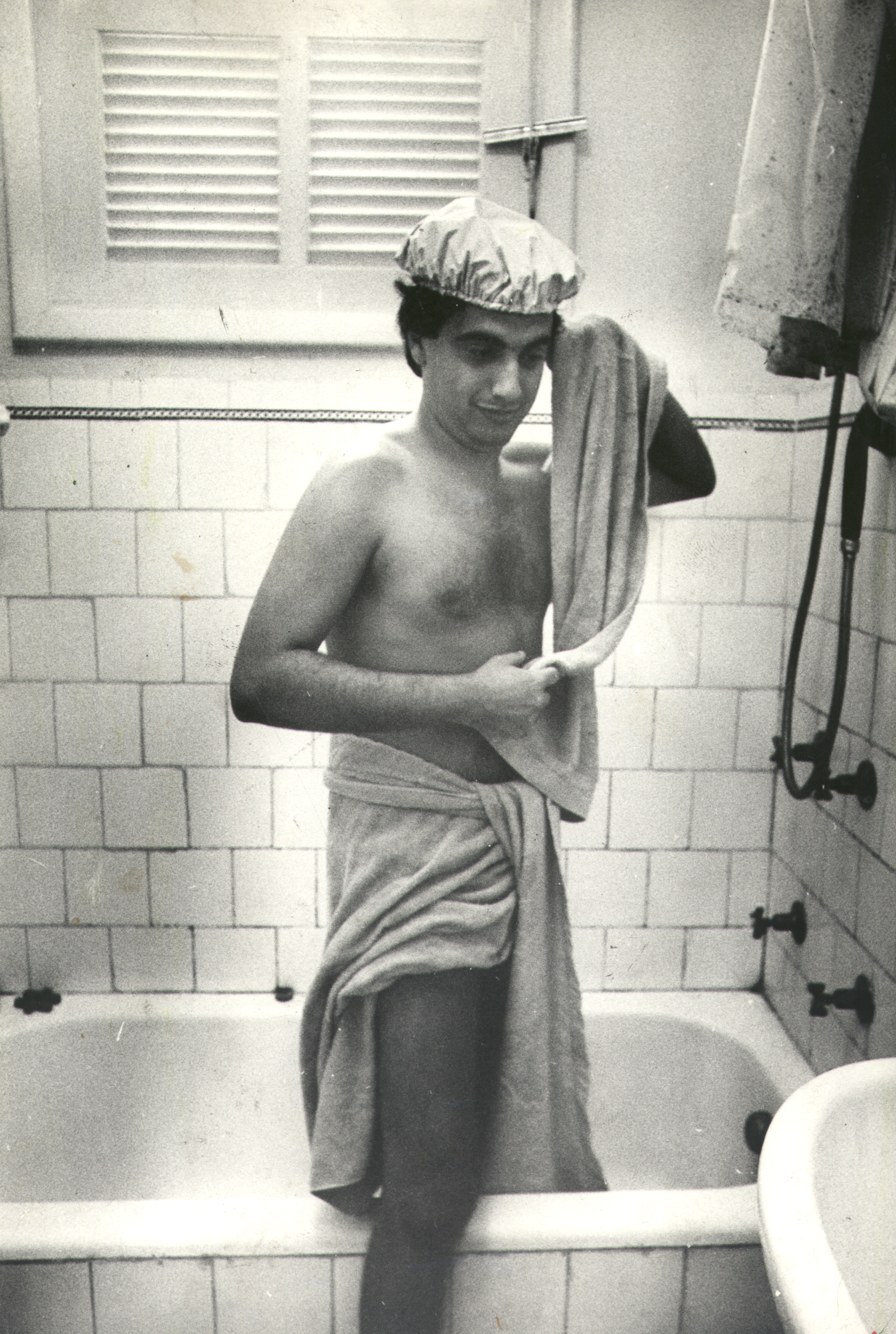
- Henfil (1971)
- Born: 5 February 1944; Ribeirão das Neves
- Died: 4 January 1988, 1988 (aged 43); Rio de Janeiro
- Occupation: Writer, cartoonist, comics artist
- Awards: Troféu Angelo Agostini for Master of National Comics (1987)

Henrique de Souza Filho (5 February 1944 – 4 January 1988), commonly known as Henfil, was a Brazilian cartoonist, caricaturist, journalist and writer, born in Ribeirão das Neves, Minas Gerais.

== Biography ==
He was a contributor to the satirical newspaper "O Pasquim", which began publication in response to press censorship in Brazil following the military crackdown of December 1968. In 1970 he published the comic book "Os Fradinhos" (The Friars), starring his most acclaimed characters. It was the first Brazilian comic book to be published in other countries. Henfil also worked in theater, film, television and literature, but political activism was his hallmark, creating fictional characters that made acerbic criticisms of the Brazilian political institutions of the time. A haemophiliac, Henfil contracted AIDS through a blood transfusion and died as a result of the disease in Rio de Janeiro.

== Characters ==
His most famous characters where:

- Fradim Baixim: (name translates roughly as "Friar Shorty") a short friar with a sadistic sense of humor. His gesture "Top! Top!" made him Henfil's most famous creation.
- Fradi Cumprido: (translates literally as "Friar Accomplished", but it's likely a deliberate misspelling of the word "comprido", which means "Long" or "Tall") a skinny friar, partner and victim of Baixim
- Graúna – a caatinga bird and ever critic of the "wonderful south”
- Capitão Zeferino: a northeaster "cangaceiro”
- Bode Francisco Orelana: intellectual and defender of the status quo.

== See also ==
- Herbert "Betinho" de Souza – Henfil's brother.
