= Aldir Blanc =

Brazilian composer (1946–2020)

- Born: Aldir Blanc Mendes; September 2, 1946; Rio de Janeiro, Brazil
- Died: May 4, 2020 (aged 73) Rio de Janeiro, Brazil
- Genres: MPB
- Occupations: songwriter, singer
- Instruments: Singer, drummer
- Years active: 1963–2020

Aldir Blanc Mendes (2 September 1946 – 4 May 2020) was a Brazilian author of crônicas (journalistic vignettes, chronicles) and lyricist. He co-composed many songs with singer-songwriter João Bosco, guitarist Guinga, and others.

== Career ==
He trained as a psychiatrist at the Federal University of the State of Rio de Janeiro, graduating in 1971. Eventually he quit medical practice and devoted all his time to music. Elis Regina recorded several of his songs, most notably "O bêbado e a equilibrista". Another song of his is "Resposta ao tempo" (with music by Cristovão Bastos), a ballad that became one of Nana Caymmi's most famous songs, and which was recorded by many other musicians thereafter, amongst them Milton Nascimento and Aldir Blanc himself.

Blanc's work 1972–1987 was analyzed by Charles A. Perrone in Masters of Contemporary Brazilian Song MPB 1965–1985 (U Texas P, 1989).

== Death ==
Blanc died at a hospital in Rio de Janeiro of complications from COVID-19 during the COVID-19 pandemic in Brazil on 4 May 2020, at the age of 73.

== Discography ==
- 1977: Disco De Ouro (with João Bosco)
- 1984: Aldir Blanc & Maurício Tapajós
- 1996: 50 Anos
- 2005: Vida Noturna
- 2021: "Aldir Blanc Inédito"
