= João Bosco =

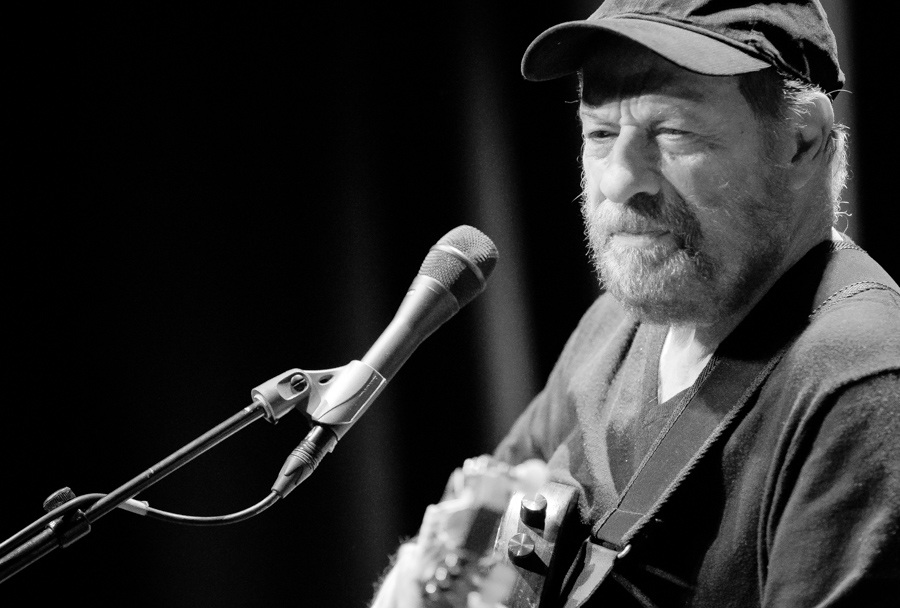
- João Bosco performing in Oslo in 2019

Background information
- Born: João Bosco de Freitas Mucci; July 13, 1946 (age 80); Ponte Nova, Minas Gerais, Brazil
- Genres: Bossa nova, MPB, samba
- Occupation: Musician
- Instrument: Guitar
- Website: joaobosco.com.br

João Bosco de Freitas Mucci (born July 13, 1946), known professionally as João Bosco (/ʒuˈaʊn/; Portuguese pronunciation: [ʒuˈɐ̃w ˈbosku]), is a Brazilian singer-songwriter and guitarist. With a career spanning more than five decades, he was named #63 of the “100 Greatest Brazilian Music Artists of All Time” by Rolling Stone Brazil in 2008. Bosco is known for both his long solo career, as well as historic collaborations with other artists in the genre of MPB (Brazilian Popular Music), most notably with iconic singer Elis Regina and with lyricist and creative partner Aldir Blanc.

== Biography and career ==
Born in Ponte Nova, Minas Gerais to a musical family with a father of Lebanese descent, Bosco began studying guitar at age twelve, with early influences including Brazilian artists Angela Maria and Cauby Peixoto, as well as American rock and roll artists such as Little Richard and Elvis Presley. Bosco studied civil engineering at the Federal University of Ouro Preto in the late 1960s while playing guitar and singing in local bars at night. Influenced by jazz, bossa nova, and the tropicalia movement, it was in Ouro Preto in 1967 that he met and collaborated with Vinicius De Moraes on several songs, including Samba de Pouso and O Mergulhador. In 1970, his partnership with Aldir Blanc came to fruition, with the two authoring more than one hundred songs together that year alone. Relocating to Rio de Janeiro in the early years of the 70's, Bosco met and formed a musical partnership with singer Elis Regina, recording several of the songs he had cowritten with Blanc. His recordings with Regina thrust him into the national spotlight, earning him a contract with RCA, and initiating a solo career that continues to the present day. In the introduction to his three-volume Songbook, Almir Chediak wrote, "Brilliant composer João Bosco's melodic and harmonic constructions are among the most auspicious in Brazilian music." Chapter Five of Masters of Contemporary Brazilian Song: MPB 1965-1985 by Charles A. Perrone is dedicated to the work of Bosco and Blanc.

== Notable compositions ==
- "O Bêbado e a Equilibrista"
- "Papel Mache"
- "Corsário"
- "O Mestre Sala dos Mares"
- "Kid Cavaquinho"
- "Latin Lover"
- "Jade"
- "Incompatibilidade de Gênios"
- "De Frente Pro Crime"
- "Naçao"
- "Bala com Bala"
- "Caça à Raposa"
- "Falso Brilhante"
- "O Ronco da Cuíca"

== Discography ==
- 1972: Disco de Bolso (Pasquim)
- 1973: João Bosco
- 1975: Caça à Raposa
- 1976: Galos de Briga
- 1977: Disco de Ouro with Aldir Blanc
- 1977: Tiro de Misericórdia
- 1979: Linha de Passe
- 1980: Bandalhismo
- 1981: Essa É a Sua Vida
- 1982: Comissão de Frente
- 1983: João Bosco ao Vivo
- 1984: Gagabirô
- 1986: Cabeça de Nego
- 1987: Ai Ai Ai de Mim
- 1989: Bosco
- 1991: Zona de Fronteira
- 1992: Acústico MTV
- 1994: Na Onda Que Balança
- 1995: Dá Licença Meu Senhor
- 1997: As Mil e Uma Aldeias
- 1998: Benguelê
- 2000: Na Esquina
- 2001: João Bosco ao Vivo
- 2003: Malabaristas do Sinal Vermelho
- 2003: Songbook 1/2/3
- 2006: Obrigado Gente! Ao Vivo
- 2010: Senhoras do Amazonas
- 2009: Não Vou Pro Céu, Mas Já Não Vivo No Chão
- 2012: 40 Anos Depois
- 2018: Mano Que Zuera
- 2020: Abricó-de-Macaco
