= Elis Regina =

Brazilian singer

- Regina in 1965
- Born: Elis Regina Carvalho Costa; March 17, 1945; Porto Alegre, Rio Grande do Sul, Brazil
- Died: January 19, 1982 (aged 36); São Paulo, São Paulo, Brazil
- Other names: Pimentinha, Furacão
- Occupation: Singer
- Years active: 1961–1982
- Spouses: Ronaldo Bôscoli (m. 1967–1972) César Camargo Mariano (m. 1973–1981)
- Musical career
- Genres: MPB, Bossa nova
- Labels: Continental, CBS, Philips
- Website: www.elisregina.com.br

Elis Regina Carvalho Costa (March 17, 1945 – January 19, 1982), known professionally as Elis Regina (Brazilian Portuguese: [eˈliz ʁeˈʒĩnɐ]), was a Brazilian singer of bossa nova, MPB and jazz music. She is also the mother of the singers Maria Rita and Pedro Mariano.

She became nationally renowned in 1965 after singing "Arrastão" (composed by Edu Lobo and Vinícius de Moraes) in the first edition of TV Excelsior festival song contest and soon joined O Fino da Bossa, a television program on TV Record. She was noted for her vocalization as well as for her interpretation and performances in shows. Her recordings include "Como Nossos Pais" (Belchior), "Upa Neguinho" (E. Lobo and Gianfrancesco Guarnieri), "Madalena" (Ivan Lins), "Casa no Campo" (Zé Rodrix and Tavito), "Águas de março" (Tom Jobim), "Atrás da Porta" (Chico Buarque and Francis Hime), "O Bêbado e a Equilibrista" (Aldir Blanc and João Bosco), "Conversando no Bar" (Milton Nascimento), "Alô, Alô Marciano" (Rita Lee and Roberto de Carvalho).

Her death, at the age of 36, shocked Brazil.

== Biography ==
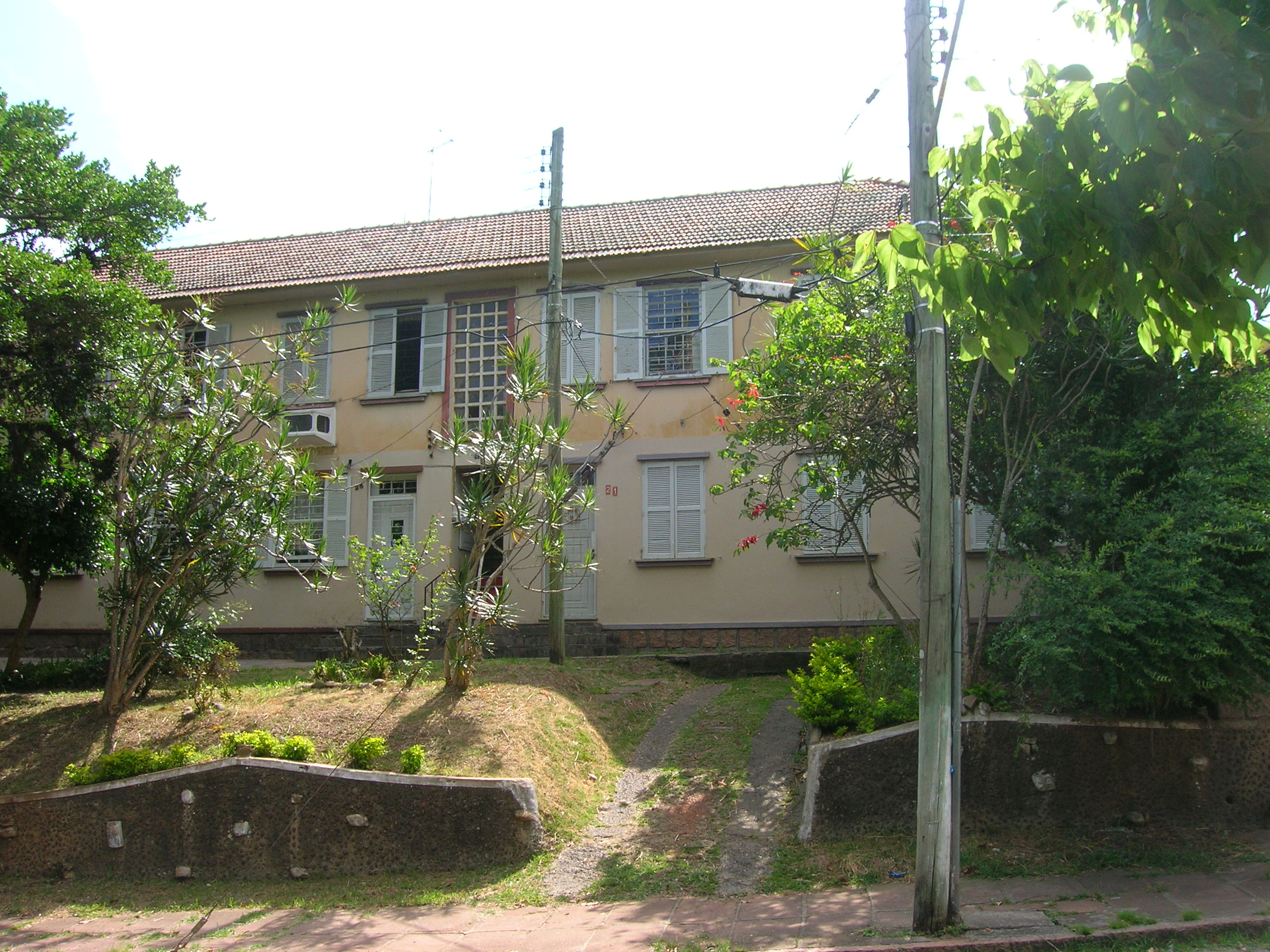
Childhood home of Elis Regina, in Porto Alegre

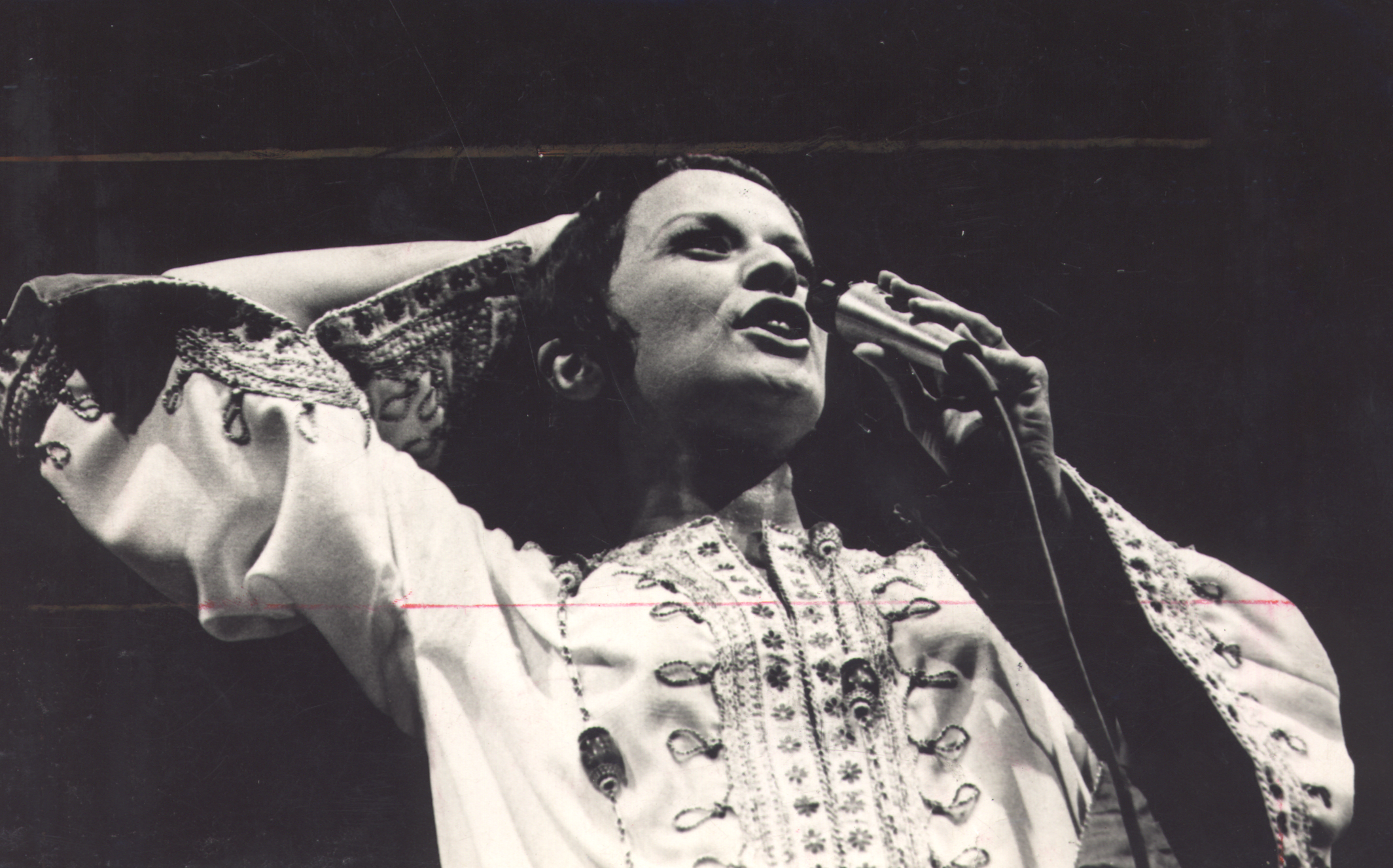
Elis Regina in Teatro da Praia, 1969. National Archives of Brazil

Elis Regina was born in Porto Alegre, where she began her career as a singer at an early age on the children's radio show Clube de Guri. In her early teens she signed a record contract and a couple years later traveled to Rio de Janeiro, where she recorded her first album. She won her first festival song contest in 1965 singing "Arrastão" ("Pull the Trawling Net") by Edu Lobo and Vinícius de Moraes, which made her the biggest selling Brazilian recording artist since Carmen Miranda. Her second album, Dois na Bossa with Jair Rodrigues, set a national sales record and became the first Brazilian album to sell over one million copies. "Arrastão" increased her popularity because the festival was broadcast via TV and radio. The record represented the beginning of música popular brasileira (Brazilian popular music) and contrasted with bossa nova. In the late 1960s and early 1970s, she helped popularize tropicalismo with Gal Costa, Gilberto Gil, and Caetano Veloso. In 1970 she had her first son with first husband Ronaldo Bôscoli. Later on she had two more children with musician Cesar Camargo Mariano.

Regina was nicknamed "hurricane" and "little pepper". She moved to Rio shortly before the 1964 Brazilian coup d'état which established the subsequent military dictatorship in Brazil. Although her popularity protected her from reprisal when she criticized the regime while on tour in Europe, she was threatened with imprisonment unless she sang the Brazilian national anthem at an event honoring the anniversary of the coup. In the 1970s she recorded the album Elis and Tom in Los Angeles with Antonio Carlos Jobim. In 1982 she was starting her third marriage when she died from a combination of alcohol and cocaine at the age of thirty-six.

== Death ==
On January 19, 1982, Regina died at the age of 36, from cardiac arrest, after consuming vermouth, cocaine and tranquilizers. More than 15,000 fans attended a musical wake in the Teatro Bandeirantes in São Paulo. She was buried in Cemitério do Morumbi.

== Legacy ==
On August 18, 1997 Regina was posthumously awarded with the rank of the Order of Prince Henry of Portugal.

In 2005, a memorial space was opened at the Casa de Cultura Mario Quintana in Porto Alegre, Brazil to house the Elis Regina Collection. The space exhibits audiovisuals, CDs, articles and other media materials and documents about the life and work of Regina.

Regina was portrayed by Andréia Horta in the 2016 movie "Elis" directed by Hugo Prata.

== Discography ==
=== Studio albums ===
Year	Album
1961	Viva a Brotolândia
1962	Poema de Amor
1963	Ellis Regina
1963	O Bem do Amor
1965	Samba - Eu Canto Assim
1966	Elis
1969	Elis - Como e Porque
1969	Elis & Toots
1970	Em Pleno Verão
1971	Ela
1972	Elis
1973	Elis
1974	Elis & Tom (with Antônio Carlos Jobim)
1974	Elis
1976	Falso Brilhante
1977	Elis
1979	Essa Mulher
1980	Saudade do Brasil
1980	Elis

=== Live albums ===
==== In life ====
Year	Album
1965	Dois na Bossa (with Jair Rodrigues)
1965	O Fino do Fino (with Zimbo Trio)
1966	Dois na Bossa nº 2 (with Jair Rodrigues)
1967	Dois na Bossa nº 3 (with Jair Rodrigues)
1970	Elis no Teatro da Praia
1978	Transversal do Tempo

==== Posthumous ====
Year	Album
1982	Montreux Jazz Festival
1982	Trem Azul
1984	Luz das Estrelas
1995	Elis ao Vivo
1998	Elis Vive
2012	Um Dia

=== Compilation albums ===
==== Posthumous ====
Year	Album
2001	Sucessos Inesquecíveis de Elis Regina
