= Vladimir Herzog =

Brazilian journalist

- Born: Vladimir Herzog; 27 June 1937; Osijek, Kingdom of Yugoslavia (now Croatia)
- Died: 25 October 1975 (aged 38); São Paulo, São Paulo, Brazil
- Cause of death: Murder (Published as Suicide by DOI-CODI)
- Education: Bachelor's degree, University of São Paulo
- Occupations: Journalist; Professor; Playwright
- Spouse: Clarice Herzog
- Children: Ivo & Andre Herzog
- Website: http://www.vladimirherzog.org/

Vladimir Herzog (27 June 1937 – 25 October 1975), known by the nickname Vlado among his family and friends, was a Brazilian journalist, university professor and playwright of Croatian-Jewish origin and born in today's Croatia. He also developed a taste for photography, because of his film projects.

Herzog was a member of the Brazilian Communist Party and was active in the civil resistance movement against the military dictatorship in Brazil. In October 1975, Herzog, then editor-in-chief of TV Cultura, was tortured to death by the political police of the military dictatorship, which later staged his suicide. It took 37 years before his death certificate was revised to say that he had in fact died as a result of torture by the army at DOI-CODI. His death had a great impact on the Brazilian society, marking the beginning of a wave of action towards the re-democratization process of the country.

== Biography ==
=== Early life ===
Herzog was born in Osijek, Kingdom of Yugoslavia province of Sava Banovina (currently Croatia) on 27 June 1937, to Zigmund and Zora Herzog, a Croatian Jewish family who emigrated to Brazil in the early 1940s, to escape Nazi and Ustashe persecution.

=== Education and career ===
Herzog received a bachelor's degree in Philosophy from the University of São Paulo in 1959. He became a naturalized Brazilian citizen in 1961 After his graduation, he worked as a journalist in the major media outlets in Brazil, notably in the newspaper O Estado de S. Paulo. During that period he decided to use "Vladimir" instead of "Vlado" as his first name because he felt that his real name sounded extremely exotic in Brazil. Following the 1964 right-wing coup d'état Herzog together with his wife Clarice Ribeiro Chaves, moved to Britain, where for three years he worked in London for the BBC. They returned to Brazil in late 1968.

In the 1970s Herzog became the editor-in-chief of TV Cultura, a public TV station managed by the São Paulo State government. He also became a journalism professor at the University of São Paulo School of Communication and Arts and at Fundação Armando Alvares Penteado's Journalism course. Alongside this, he developed a career as a playwright, mixing with the artistic and theatre Intelligentsia of Brazil. Later in his life, Herzog became active in the civil resistance movement against the military dictatorship in Brazil, as a member of the Brazilian Communist Party (Portuguese: Partido Comunista Brasileiro - PCB). As a news director at the TV station, Herzog advocated the responsibility of journalists to society and reported on the first decade of the Brazilian military dictatorship. Military intelligence spies working inside the TV station reported to their handlers that Herzog is "a problem for the military regime."

=== Arrest and death ===
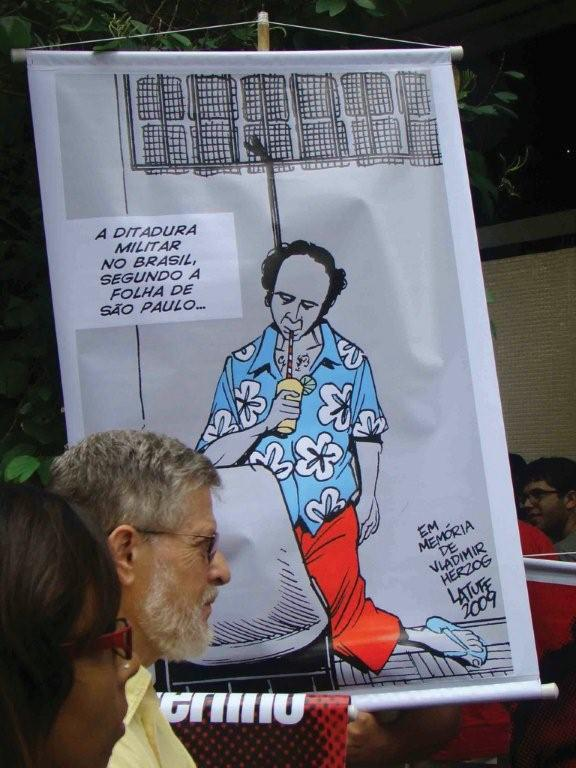
2009 event in Brazil. A poster from political cartoonist Carlos Latuff with the sarcastic legend: The military dictatorship in Brazil, according to the newspaper Folha de São Paulo. It is based on the infamous photo of Herzog by the Brazilian intelligence and repression agency Departamento de Operações de Informações - Centro de Operações de Defesa Interna (English: Department of Information Operations - Center for Internal Defense Operations) São Paulo.

On 24 October 1975 – when Herzog was already editor-in-chief of TV Cultura – Brazilian Army agents summoned him to testify about his connections with the then outlawed PCB Party. The following day, Herzog went to the DOI-CODI in order to comply with the summons. This meeting, however, was actually a ruse to conduct an interrogation of Herzog, wherein he was detained, beaten and tortured. He was arrested with other two journalists, Jorge Duque Estrada Benigno and Rodolfo Konder, who later confirmed the treatment he received.

On 25 October, Herzog's body was found hanging in his prison cell. Before the revision, his death certificate stated: "suicide by hanging". According to the opposition, the DOI-CODI officers would have placed his body in the position it was found in order to inform the press that he had committed suicide.

==== Aftermath ====
Herzog was married to advertising agent Clarice Herzog, with whom he had two young children. Three years later, she was able to legally blame the state for the death of her husband. Still unable to cope with Herzog's death, she has said that "Vlado would contribute more to society if he were alive". The death of Herzog boosted the movement against the military dictatorship in Brazil. Generating a wave of protests from the international press, and initiating a process in defence of human rights in Latin America,

The autopsy was inconclusive, but at the time forensic pathologists were members of the police and systematically produced false autopsy reports in cases of death by torture.

Public opinion, however, never accepted this version and his murder generated national indignation. The president of the Republic at the time, General Ernesto Geisel was also upset by these and other actions by what he called the "criminals" of the largely parallel power of military-directed violent political repression. As a result, he ordered a clean-up and reduction in these activities, firing the main ultra-right wing general behind it, Ednardo D'Ávila Melo.

According to Henry Sobel, the chief rabbi of the main synagogue of São Paulo at the time, the murder of Herzog changed the country. "It was the catalyst of the eventual restoration of democracy. His death will always be a painful memory of a shady period of repression, a perpetual echo of the voice of freedom, which will never be kept silent".

After finding out that Herzog's body bore the marks of torture, Rabbi Sobel decided that he should be buried in the centre of the cemetery rather than in a corner, as Jewish tradition demands in cases of suicide. This was made public and completely destroyed the official version of suicide. Officially, the first irrefutable proof that Herzog's death was not a suicide was reported in Fernando Pacheco Jordão's Dossier Herzog - Prisão, Tortura e Morte no Brasil. The author points out that the picture provided by the military as proof of Herzog's suicide portrayed the prisoner hanging by his prison belt tied to his cell's bars with his feet touching the floor and his knees notably bent.

By the time of Herzog's death, Brazil was in extreme tension. The military had been in power for over ten years and the Brazilian population was constantly in fear. Herzog was the thirty-eighth person to "commit suicide" after being arrested by the military. The first thirty-seven, however, were not as renowned as Herzog was. Precisely because he was a public figure his death attracted public and governmental attention to the case. His death is seen today as the beginning of the end of the Brazilian military dictatorship. Herzog has become a symbol of the fight for democracy in Brazil and has been honoured in many ways, such as by attributing it to the street where the TV Cultura is located in São Paulo. In addition, a public prize for journalism devoted to amnesty and human rights has been established in his name (Prêmio de Jornalismo Vladimir Herzog de Anistia e Direitos Humanos).

===== Litigation and investigation =====
Later, in a civil lawsuit filed by his widow against the government, a federal tribunal recognized his wrongful death and granted monetary damages to Herzog's family. A documentary by director João Batista de Andrade, titled Herzog - 30 anos, was filmed in 2005. In the same year, new photographs of a still-living and fully naked Herzog in the prison cell were released on the Internet, authorized by a high-ranking military officer in president Luiz Inácio Lula da Silva's office.

At the request of several religious and human rights groups, the Inter-American Commission on Human Rights, an independent arm of the Organization of American States, investigated the conflicting circumstances surrounding the death of Vladimir Herzog, and found that the Brazilian junta arrested, tortured and murdered Herzog because of his activities as a journalist.

A new death certificate was issued 37 years after Herzog's death to indicate that he died "due to physical torture at the facilities of DOI-Codi in the 2nd Army in São Paulo." His previous certificate indicated a possible suicide.

Ivo Herzog, son of Vladimir Herzog, delivered petitions for José Maria Marin's removal from the Brazilian Football Confederation (CBF) and from the 2014 FIFA World Cup. Ivo cited the speeches Marin delivered as congressional representative that praised Sérgio Fleury, who was head of the Department of Political and Social Order (Departamento de Ordem Politica e Social) during Brazil's military dictatorship, and for criticizing Herzog in speeches from 1975.

On 26 June 2025, the federal government formally admitted responsibility for Herzog's death.

== Legacy ==
In 2009, over 30 years after Herzog's death, the Vladimir Herzog Institute was founded. Its aims are to archive material about Herzog, to promote debate about the role of journalists and new media, and to award the Vladimir Herzog Prize for Amnesty and Human Rights to journalists and human rights activists.

== See also ==
- List of unsolved murders (1900–1979)
