= DOI-CODI =

Secret police in Brazil (1964–1985)

Department of Information Operations — Center for Internal Defense Operations
- Departamento de Operações de Informações - Centro de Operações de Defesa Interna

Agency overview
- Formed: 2 July 1969
- Dissolved: 15 March 1985
- Jurisdiction: Brazil
- Headquarters: Rua Barão de Mesquita, 425; Tijuca, Rio de Janeiro
- Parent agency: Ministry of War

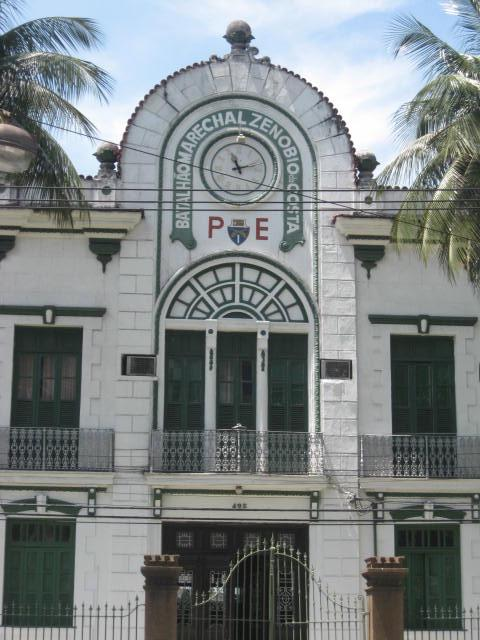
Barracks of the 1st Army Police Battalion and headquarters of the former DOI-CODI in Rio de Janeiro.

The Departamento de Operações de Informações — Centro de Operações de Defesa Interna (DOI-CODI; English: Department of Information Operations — Center for Internal Defense Operations) was the Brazilian intelligence and political repression agency during the military dictatorship of 1964–85. This period started on March 31, 1964, with the removal of the civilian government by military forces and ended in 1984. DOI-CODI was responsible for suppressing internal dissent against the regime. It acted as a political police, using torture and other counter-insurgency methods, with a focus on anti-communism. Many political activists, intellectuals, artists, college students and journalists were interrogated, tortured and murdered by the DOI-CODI throughout its existence.

The first DOI unit started in São Paulo as a private organization called "OBAN - Bandeirante Operation" (Operação Bandeirante – OBAN). OBAN was an illegal organization created using members of the federal police, civil state police, military state police and select members of the armed forces. It was financed by private and corporate entities.

Each state had a DOI unit subordinated to CODI, which had the role of centralizing the operations. The DOI units' composition mirrored that of the previous OBAN.

The largest DOI-CODI, that of São Paulo, had at its peak nearly 250 agents, occupying a large building on Tutóia street. The building gained the infamous nickname of "Tutóia Hilton" (after the Hanoi Hilton of Vietnam) due to the extensive torture which took place in its basement.

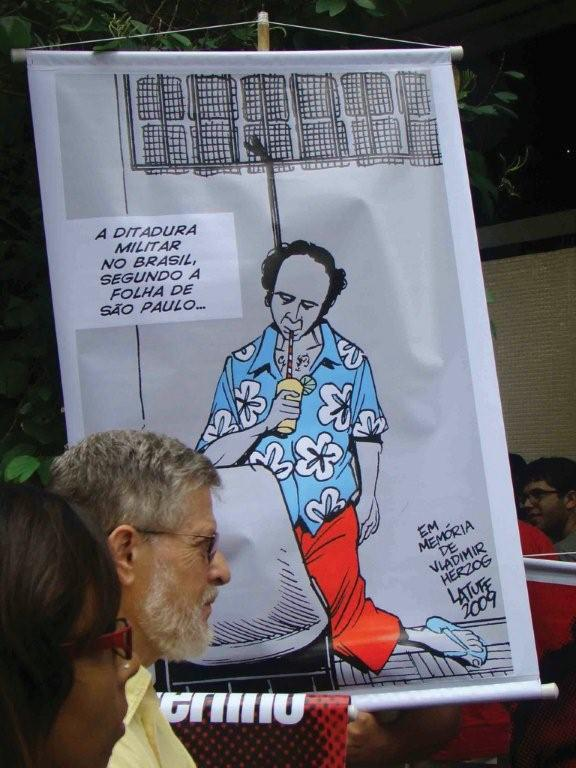
2009 event in Brazil. A poster from political cartoonist Carlos Latuff about the assassination of Vladimir Herzog with sarcastic text: "The military dictatorship in Brazil, according to the newspaper Folha de São Paulo".

== See also ==
- ABIN (Agência Brasileira de Inteligência) - Brazilian Intelligence Agency
- SNI (Serviço Nacional de Informações) - National Information Service
- DOPS (Departamento de Ordem Politica e Social) - Department of Social and Political Order
- Araguaia Guerrilla War
- 1975 assassination of Vladimir Herzog
