= Never Again =

Never Again may refer to:

- Never again, a phrase associated with the Holocaust and other genocides

== Film and television ==
- Never Again (1916 film), a silent comedy short starring Oliver Hardy
- Never Again (1924 film), featuring Al St. John
- Never Again (2001 film), a film by Eric Schaeffer
- "Never Again" (The X-Files), a 1997 episode of The X-Files
- "Never Again", an episode of Alfred Hitchcock Presents
- "Never Again… Never Again", an episode of Magnum, P.I.

== Literature ==
- Never Again (series), a series of alternate history books by R. J. Rummel
- Never Again: Securing America and Restoring Justice, a book by John Ashcroft
- Never Again: Ustashi Genocide in the Independent State of Croatia (NDH) from 1941–1945, a book by Milan Bulajić
- "Never Again": A History of the Holocaust, a 2000 book by Martin Gilbert
- Never Again: Britain 1945–51, a 1992 book by Peter Hennessy
- Never Again! A Program for Survival, a 1972 book by Meir Kahane
- Never Again, a 1912 play by Anthony E. Wills
- Never Again! The Government Conspiracy in the JFK Assassination, a 1995 book by Harold Weisberg

== Music ==
=== Albums ===
- Never Again! (James Moody album) (1972)
- Never Again (Lee Soo Young album) (2001)
- Never Again (Discharge album) (1984)
- Never Again (Discharge EP), or the title song
- Never Again (Kittie EP), or the title song

=== Songs ===
- "Never Again" (Tomas Ledin song) (1982)
- "Never Again" (Breaking Benjamin song) (2017)
- "Never Again" (Kelly Clarkson song) (2007)
- "Never Again" (Danny Fernandes song) (2009)
- "Never Again" (The Midway State song) (2008)
- "Never Again" (Nickelback song) (2002)
- "Never... Again", a song by All Shall Perish from Awaken the Dreamers
- "Never Again", a song by Angelic Upstarts from Teenage Warning
- "Never Again", a song by Asia from Phoenix
- "Never Again", a song by Cellador from Enter Deception
- "Never Again", a song by Disturbed from Asylum
- "Never Again", a song by For the Fallen Dreams from Changes
- "Never Again", a song by Galneryus from Into the Purgatory
- "Never Again", a song by Ja Rule from Pain Is Love
- "Never Again", a song by Killswitch Engage from Killswitch Engage
- "Never Again", a song by Kittie from Funeral for Yesterday
- "Never Again", a song by Lil Durk from Almost Healed
- "Never Again", a song by Milk Inc.
- "Never Again", a song by The Mission from Masque
- "Never Again", a song by Paradise Lost from Believe in Nothing
- "Never Again", a song by Power Quest from Master of Illusion
- "Never Again", a song by Remedy from The Genuine Article
- "Never Again", a song by Skyscraper from Superstate
- "Never Again", a song by Slowthai from Ugly
- "Never Again", a song by Therion from Beloved Antichrist
- "Never Again", a song by Justin Timberlake from Justified

== See also ==
- Lest We Forget (disambiguation)
- Never Again Action a Jewish political action organization
- "Never Again, Again", a 1997 song performed by Lee Ann Womack
- "Never Again" Association, an anti-racist organization in Poland
- "Never Again" Declaration, a 2016 declaration adopted at a conference organized by Raoul Wallenberg Centre for Human Rights
- Never Again MSD, a student-led gun control advocacy group
- Never Again pledge, a United States campaign against a database identifying persons by race or religion
- Never Forget (disambiguation)
- Never Say Never Again, a 1983 James Bond film
- Nie wieder (disambiguation)
- Nunca Más (disambiguation)
