= Nunca Más (disambiguation) =

Nunca Más is Spanish for "never again". It may refer to:

- Nunca Más report (Never Again), 1984, by Argentina's National Commission on the Disappearance of Persons
- Nunca Más, a public holiday in Uruguay
- Plataforma Nunca Máis, Galician political movement
- Brasil: Nunca Mais, a book detailing killings by the Brazilian dictatorship
- Ya nunca más (film), a 1984 Mexican film directed by Abel Salazar
- Ya nunca más (album), a 1984 album by Luis Miguel

== See also ==
- Never Again (disambiguation)
