= Known unto God =

Phrase used on the gravestones of unknown soldiers

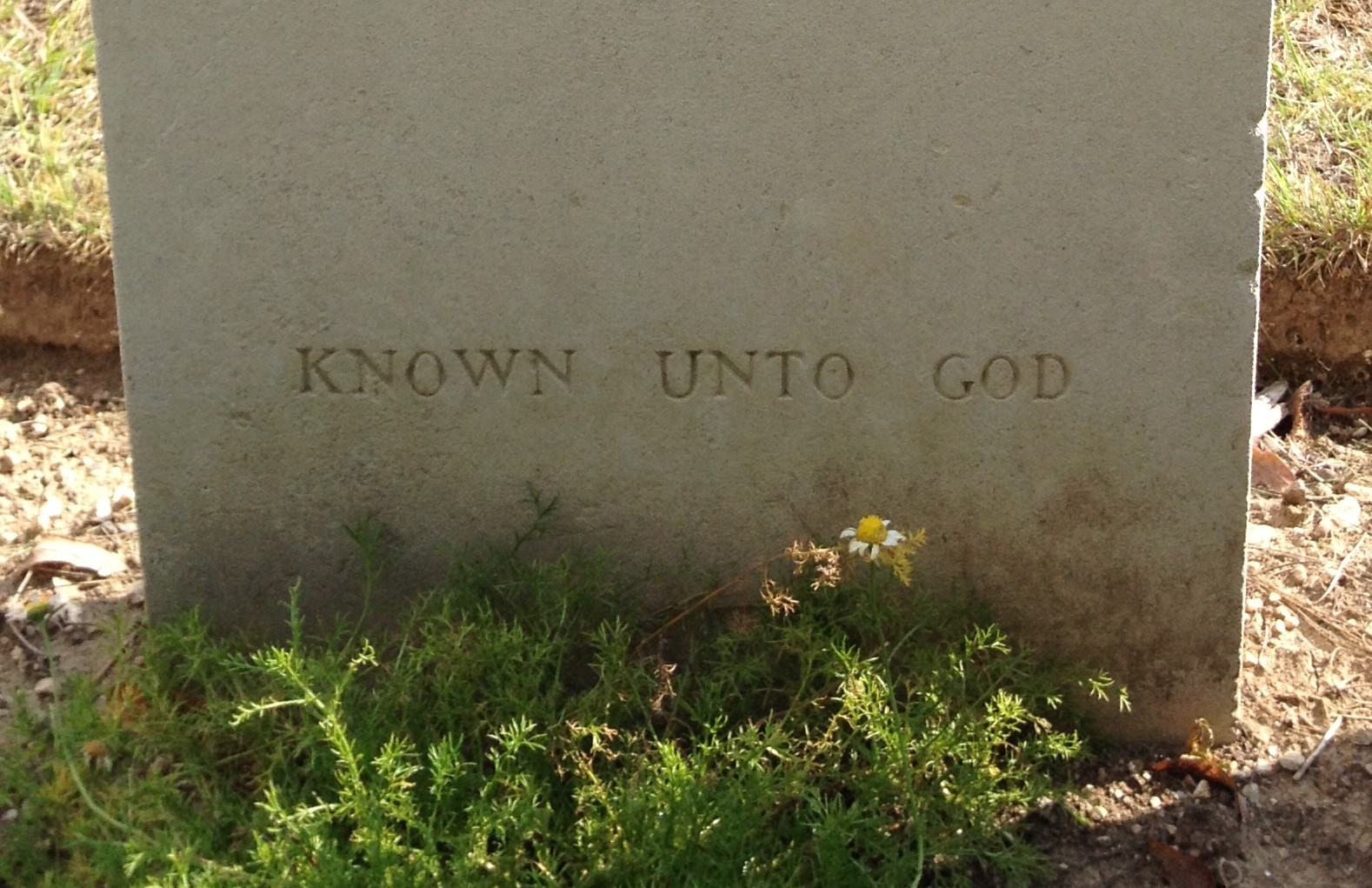
The phrase engraved onto a CWGC gravestone

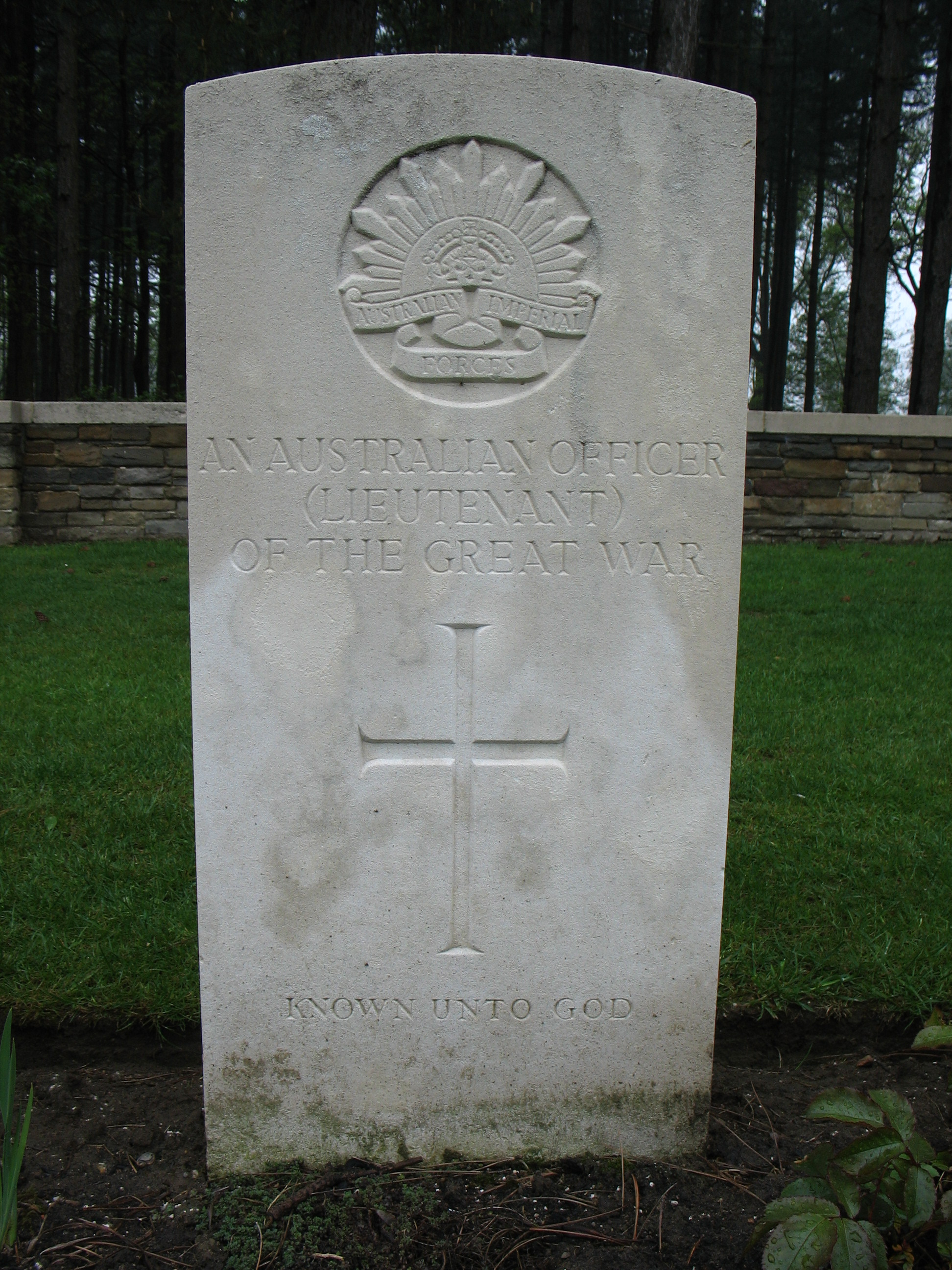
Use on a First World War gravestone for an unknown Australian lieutenant

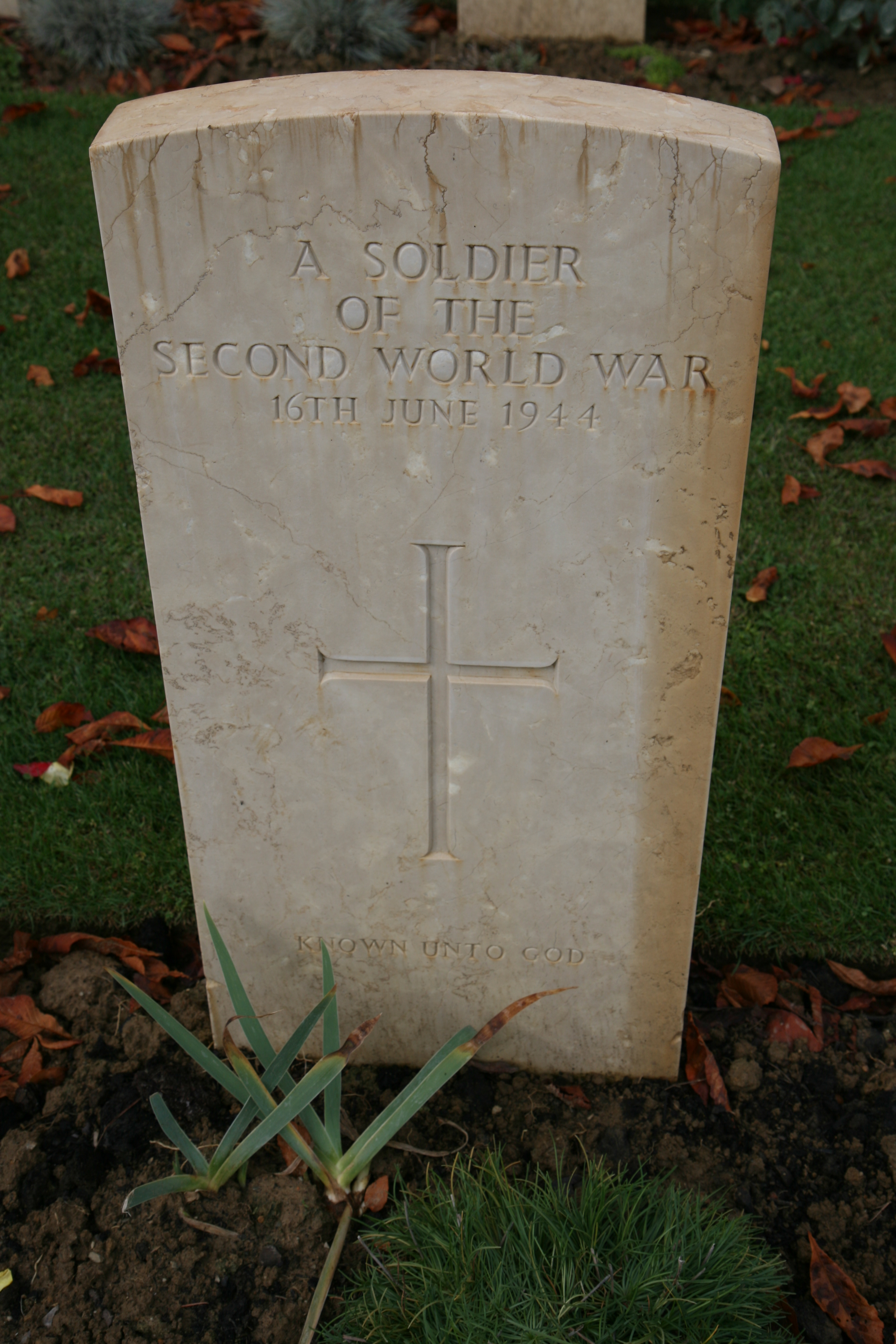
Use on a Second World War grave marker for British or Commonwealth soldier, killed on 16th June 1944

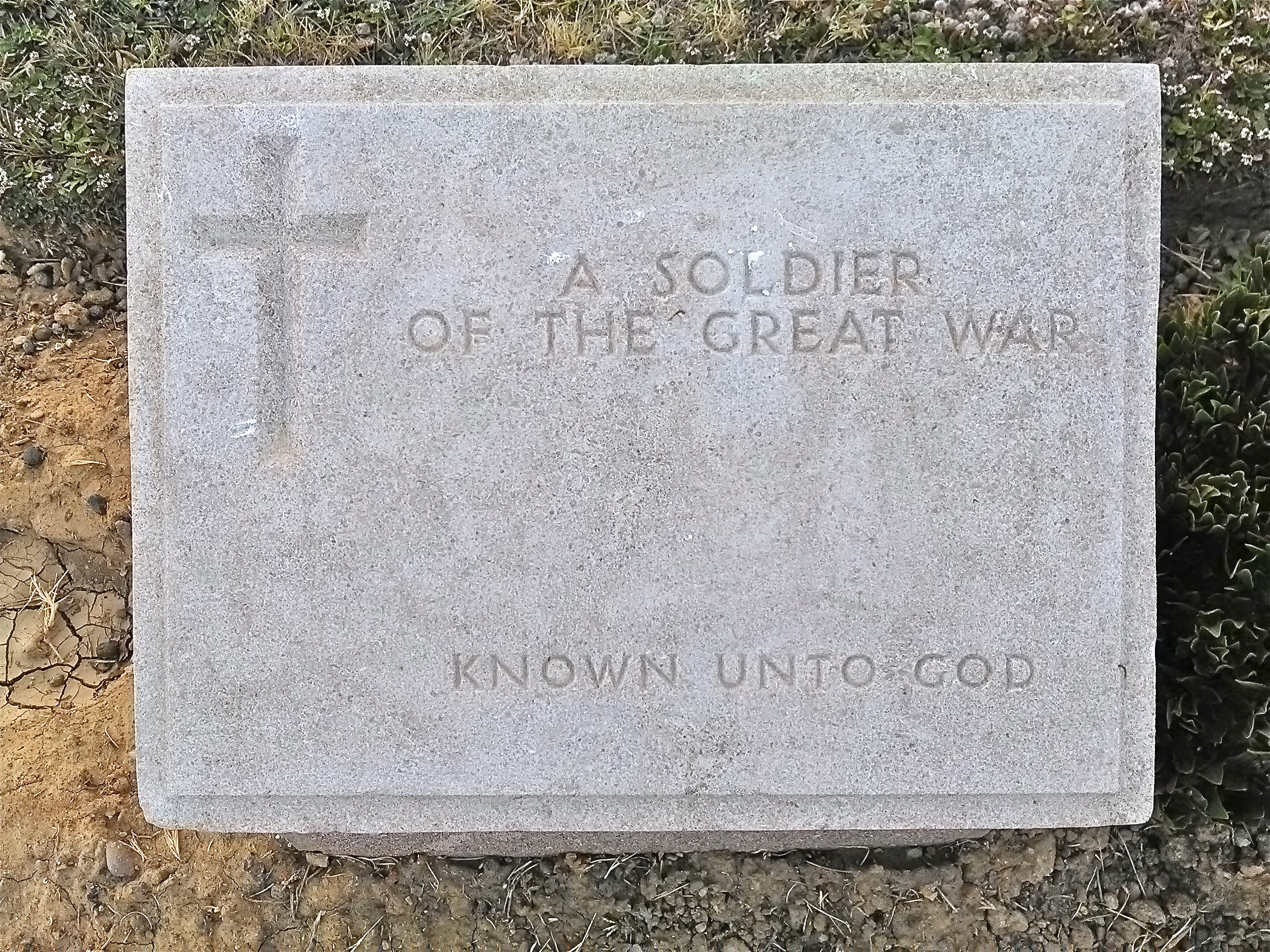
Used on a variant headstone for geologically unstable areas

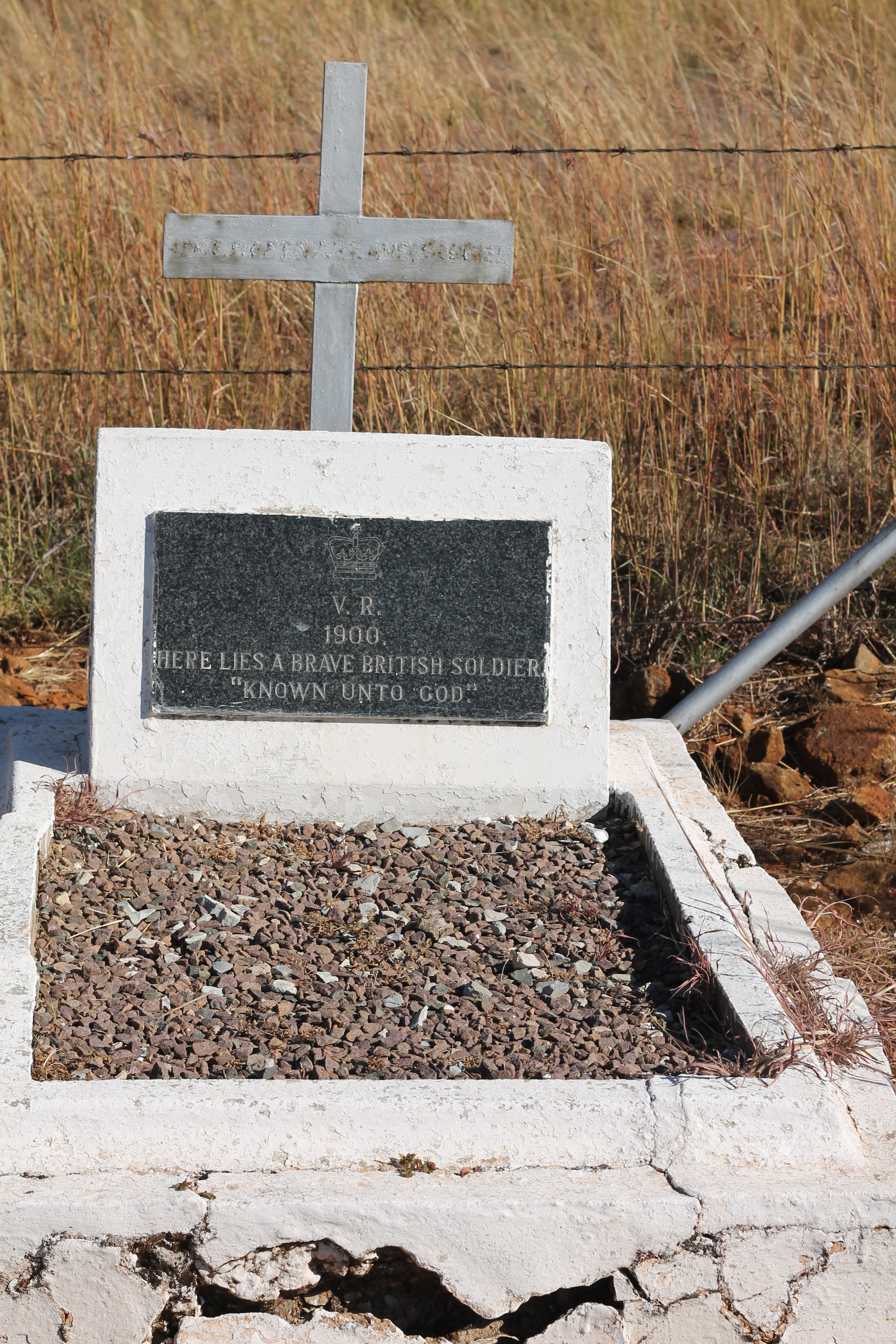
Use on a 1900 Second Boer War grave marker of an unknown British soldier, though the plaque is of a later date

Known unto God is a phrase used on the gravestones of unknown soldiers in Commonwealth War Graves Commission (CWGC) cemeteries. The phrase was selected by British poet Rudyard Kipling who worked for what was then the Imperial War Graves Commission during the First World War. The origin of the phrase is unknown but it has been linked to sections of the King James Bible. The phrase was re-used for those killed during the Second World War and appears on more than 212,000 gravestones across the world. In 2013 there was controversy when it was proposed that the phrase be removed from the Tomb of the Unknown Soldier at the Australian War Memorial.

Kipling's inspiration for the wording of "known unto God" is unknown, however the phrase occurs twice in the King James Bible. In Philippians 4:6 in which the reader is urged not to worry and to make all his desires "known unto God" and in Acts of the Apostles 15:18 which states "Known unto God are all his works from the beginning of the world" to explain the extent of God's power. Kipling's phrasing has been linked by at least one commentator to the Epistle to the Galatians 4:9 which in the King James version is rendered "But now, after that ye have known God, or rather are known of God" and describes the nature of the personal relationship between the worshipper and the deity.

== Background ==
The phrase "Known unto God" forms the standard epitaph for all unidentified soldiers of the First World War buried in Commonwealth War Graves Commission (CWGC) cemeteries. The phrase is engraved towards the bottom of the gravestone. The first line of text on the stone is a description of the deceased, which may be little more than "A soldier of the Great War"; the centre shows a cross, though the deceased's actual religious affiliation may be unknown; and the top an appropriate unit badge where known. The phrase appears on more than 212,000 CWGC gravestones around the world.

== Kipling ==
The phrase was selected by British poet Rudyard Kipling. Kipling had joined the Imperial War Graves Commission (IWGC) – the predecessor to the CWGC – in 1917 as its first literary adviser.

Kipling's involvement with the IWGC may have been influenced by the loss of his only son John Kipling in the 1915 Battle of Loos. John was missing presumed killed in action (his grave was only identified in 1992) and this weighed heavily upon Rudyard Kipling. In discussing memorials to those missing with no known grave he said "[t]his matter is naturally of the deepest concern to the relatives of those whose bodies have never been recovered or identified, or whose graves, once made, have been destroyed by later battles" and when the ongoing funding of the IWGC was discussed in parliament he was quick to defend it stating "our boy was missing at Loos. The ground is of course battered and mined past all hope of any trace being recovered. I wish some of the people who are making this trouble realised how more than fortunate they are to have a name on a headstone in a known place". Kipling was renowned as an author who contributed to the mythology of the British Empire in the late-19th and early 20th-centuries so he seems to have been a natural choice to compose the texts to commemorate that Empire's contribution to the war.

== Origins of the phrase ==
Kipling's choice of wording may have been influenced by his experience as a grieving father. At the time his poetry was also becoming more fragmented and bitter in nature. Some of his poems of the time were just two lines long, of a similar length to the epitaphs. Kipling's inspiration for the wording of "known unto God" is unknown, however the phrase occurs twice in the King James Bible. In Philippians 4:6 in which the reader is urged not to worry and to make all his desires "known unto God" and in Acts of the Apostles 15:18 which states "Known unto God are all his works from the beginning of the world" to explain the extent of God's power. Kipling's phrasing has been linked by at least one commentator to the Epistle to the Galatians 4:9 which in the King James version is rendered "But now, after that ye have known God, or rather are known of God" and describes the nature of the personal relationship between the worshipper and the deity. Kipling is known to have taken phrases from the King James Bible for his works, including "lest we forget" (from Deuteronomy 6:12) in his 1897 work "Recessional", which is now frequently used in remembrance services.

Kipling also selected the phrasings "their glory shall not be blotted out" which is used on the headstones of those whose burial place was once known but was lost during the course of the war; "believed to be buried in this cemetery" which is used for individuals whose exact burial place is unknown but are known to be within a certain cemetery; "the glorious dead" which is used on The Cenotaph, Whitehall and "their name liveth for evermore" which is used on Stones of Remembrance in CWGC cemeteries. The phrasing of the last is known to have been taken by Kipling from the Book of Ecclesiasticus.

== Legacy ==
Kipling is described as one of the three key figures in the development of the IWGC cemeteries, along with architect Edwin Lutyens and garden designer Gertrude Jekyll. He continued to be involved in the IWGC post-war, writing a description of the work of the commission in the 1919 book The Graves of the Fallen and also contributing a preface to a Thomas Cook sales brochure describing the decorum that tourists should exhibit whilst visiting the cemeteries.

The phrase was used again by the CWGC for unknown graves of the 1939-45 war in which use it is preceded by the phrase "a soldier of the Second World War" or a variant thereof. It has been used on the gravestones of the British dead of the 1899–1901 Second Boer War, for example at Spion Kop where some graves read: "A brave British soldier – known unto God", though these stones do not seem to be contemporary to the war. The phrase continues to be used in modern works, for example a British poet included it as a line in a work to honour the dead of the Malaysia Airlines Flight 17 in 2014.

== 2013 Australian War Memorial controversy ==
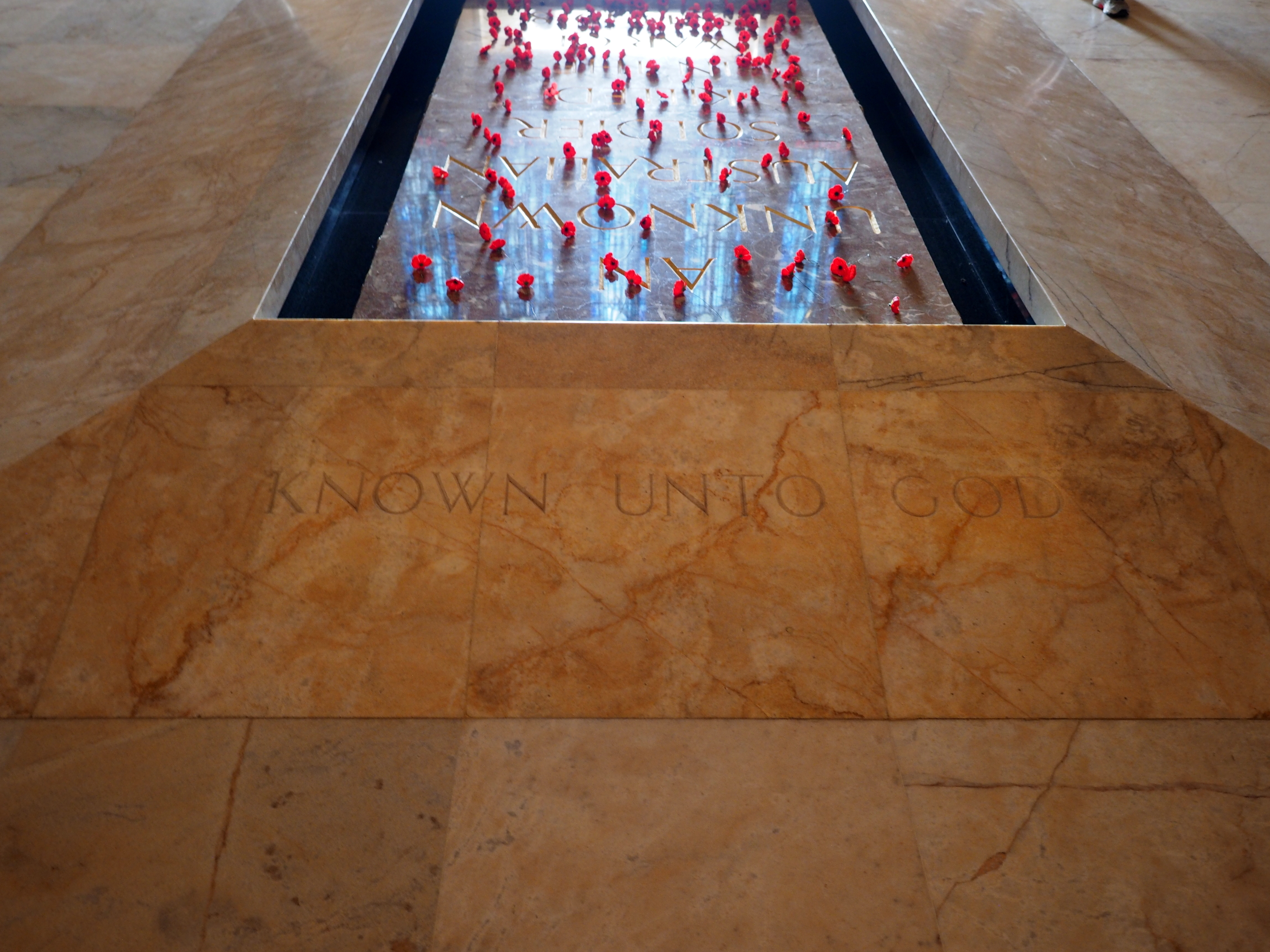
"Known unto God" inscribed into the Tomb of the Unknown Soldier at the Australian War Memorial

To mark the 75th anniversary of the end of the First World War in 1993, an unknown Australian soldier from the CWGC Adelaide Cemetery at Villers-Bretonneux was returned to Australia to establish a Tomb of the Unknown Soldier in the Hall of Memory of the Australian War Memorial (AWM) in Canberra. A eulogy was delivered by Prime Minister Paul Keating at the re-interment, which included the words: "We do not know this Australian's name ... he has always been among those we have honoured ... We know that he was one of the 45,000 Australians who died on the Western Front ... He is all of them. And he is one of us." (Note: In some early sources, the words for the inscription were incorrectly cited as "He is one of them, he is all of us". The excerpt from Keating's eulogy and that appear on the inscription are "He is all of them / And he is one of us".)

In 1999, the "Known unto God" phrase was added to the tomb, despite founding figure Charles Bean's intention that there were to be no religious aspects to the memorial and the AWM always having been a secular institution. In 2013 the AWM resolved to replace the phrase with words from Keating's eulogy. After some complaints about removal of the phrase, it was determined to retain it but to add the words to the tomb from the Keating eulogy: "He is all of them, and he is one of us".

== Variations ==
The Tomb of the Unknown Soldier in the United States bears a similar inscription "...known but to God", on the west panel.
