= World War I Memorial Arch at Keezha Valadi =

Commemorative structure to honor Indian soldiers

Coordinates: 10°52′24″N 78°46′12″E

The World War I memorial arch, located at Keezha Valadi near Lalgudi in Tiruchi district, India, is a commemorative structure built during the British era to honor Indian soldiers who contributed to the Allied victory in World War I.

== History ==
Erected by Dewan Bahadur G. Krishnamachariar and inaugurated by Dewan Bahadur Sir T. Desikachariar, then president of the Trichinopoly District Board, on August 10, 1922, the arch commemorates the significant role of Indian troops in the war. The arch, standing about 5.75 meters in height, features a plaque with the inscription “in commemoration of the glorious victory of the Allied Arms in which the Indian troops played a prominent part.” The phrase “Lest we forget” is engraved on the top.

Known locally as ‘Pachampettai Valaivu’, the arch is situated at the entrance to Pachampettai on the eastern side of Keezha Valadi. It serves as a gateway for several nearby villages, including Periyavar Seeli, Mayil Arangam, Pachampettai, and Thirumanamedu, to access the Lalgudi-Tiruchi Road.

== Restoration efforts ==
In October 2021, the ASI’s Tiruchi Circle proposed a restoration plan for the arch, estimated at ₹6.75 lakh. The plan includes:

- Dismantling a brick masonry structure of a shop encroaching upon the arch.
- De-plastering damaged or decayed lime mortar.
- Re-plastering with two coats of lime mortar.
- Mending and strengthening the stucco figures and ornamental portions of the arch.

This initiative is part of the ASI Tiruchi Circle's broader mission to preserve lesser-known heritage structures in central and southern districts. The conserved structure was re-dedicated with a ceremony by ASI’s Tiruchi chapter on August 15, 2022.
