= Never Forget =

Never Forget may refer to:

- "Never Forget" (Take That song), a 1995 song by Take That
  - Never Forget (musical), a 2008 jukebox musical based on the songs of Take That
  - Never Forget – The Ultimate Collection, an album and DVD by Take That
- Never Forget (Where You Come From), an album by Bro'Sis
- "Never Forget" (Lena Katina song), 2011
- "Never Forget" (Greta Salóme and Jónsi song), the 2012 Icelandic Eurovision entry
- "Never Forget" (Sampa the Great song), 2022
- "Never Forget" (Kessoku Band song), 2022
- Never Forget (film), a 1991 television film starring Leonard Nimoy
- "Never Forget" (Robot Chicken), a 2018 television episode

== See also ==
- Never Forget You (disambiguation)
- I'll Never Forget You (disambiguation)
- Never again
- Never Again (disambiguation)
- Lest We Forget (disambiguation)
