= Nie wieder =

Nie wieder ("Never again") may refer to:

- "Nie wieder Faschismus", part of the words on Hitler birthplace memorial stone
- "Nie wieder", a 1993 song from Austria in the Eurovision Song Contest 1993
- "Nie wieder", a 1998 song by Böhse Onkelz from Kneipenterroristen
- "Nie wieder", a 2004 song by Bushido from Electro Ghetto

== See also ==
- Nie wieder Liebe, 1931 German musical comedy film
- Never Again (disambiguation)
