= Never Forget You =

Never Forget You may refer to:

- "Never Forget You" (Mariah Carey song), 1994
- "Never Forget You" (Noisettes song), 2009
- "Never Forget You" (Zara Larsson and MNEK song), 2015

== See also ==
- Never Forget (disambiguation)
- Never Forget Me, a 1976 South Korean film
- I'll Never Forget You (disambiguation)
- Won't Forget You (disambiguation)
