= Zakhor =

Zakhor or zachor is a Hebrew language word for remembrance, used in particular with respect to keeping the sabbath, and remembering the covenant, the Exodus, and the Holocaust. It may also refer to:

- Shabbat Zachor, the sabbath of remembrance, immediately preceding Purim
- Zakhor: Jewish History and Jewish Memory, a 1982 book on Jewish history
- Zakhor Jews, a group of Jews near Timbuktu dating back to the 8th century CE
- Avideh Zakhor (born 1964), Iranian-American electrical engineer

== See also ==
- Qeshlaq-e Zakhor, a village in northern Iran
- Sefid Zakhor gas field, in Iran
