= Lest We Forget =

Lest We Forget may refer to:

- "Lest we forget", a phrase in the poem "Recessional" by Rudyard Kipling
- "Ode of Remembrance", United Kingdom, Canada, Australia, and New Zealand
- Lest We Forget (sculpture), a bronze sculpture by Karl Alfred Quilter

== Film and television ==
- Lest We Forget (1918 film), a 1918 film by Léonce Perret
- Lest We Forget (1934 film), a British film directed by John Baxter
- Lest We Forget (1935 film), a 100-minute official government documentary on the First World War produced by the Canadian Government Motion Picture Bureau
- Lest We Forget (1937 film), starring Harry Carey
- Lest We Forget (1947 film), a 1947 military documentary produced by the U.S. army and signal corps
- Lest We Forget (1991 film), a 1991 film by Jean-Luc Godard
- "Lest We Forget" (Doctors), a 2004 television episode
- "Lest We Forget" (Magnum, P.I.), a 1981 television episode

== Literature ==
- "Lest We Forget", a science fiction short story by David Barr Kirtley and 1997 Dell Magazines Award winner
- Lest We Forget: The Passage from Africa to Slavery and Emancipation, Alex award-winning book by Velma Maia Thomas
- "Lest We Forget", a column by "Natyaguru" Nurul Momen in The Bangladesh Times

== Music ==
- Lest We Forget: The Best Of, 2004 album by Marilyn Manson
- "Lest We Forget", a song by Bolt Thrower from the 1994 album ...For Victory
- "Lest We Forget", a song by The Real McKenzies from the 2003 album Oot & Aboot
- "Lest We Forget", a song by Ron Dawson and Kevin Morgan 2012 from the album Ron Dawson
