= Their name liveth for evermore =

Biblical phrase commonly inscribed on war memorials

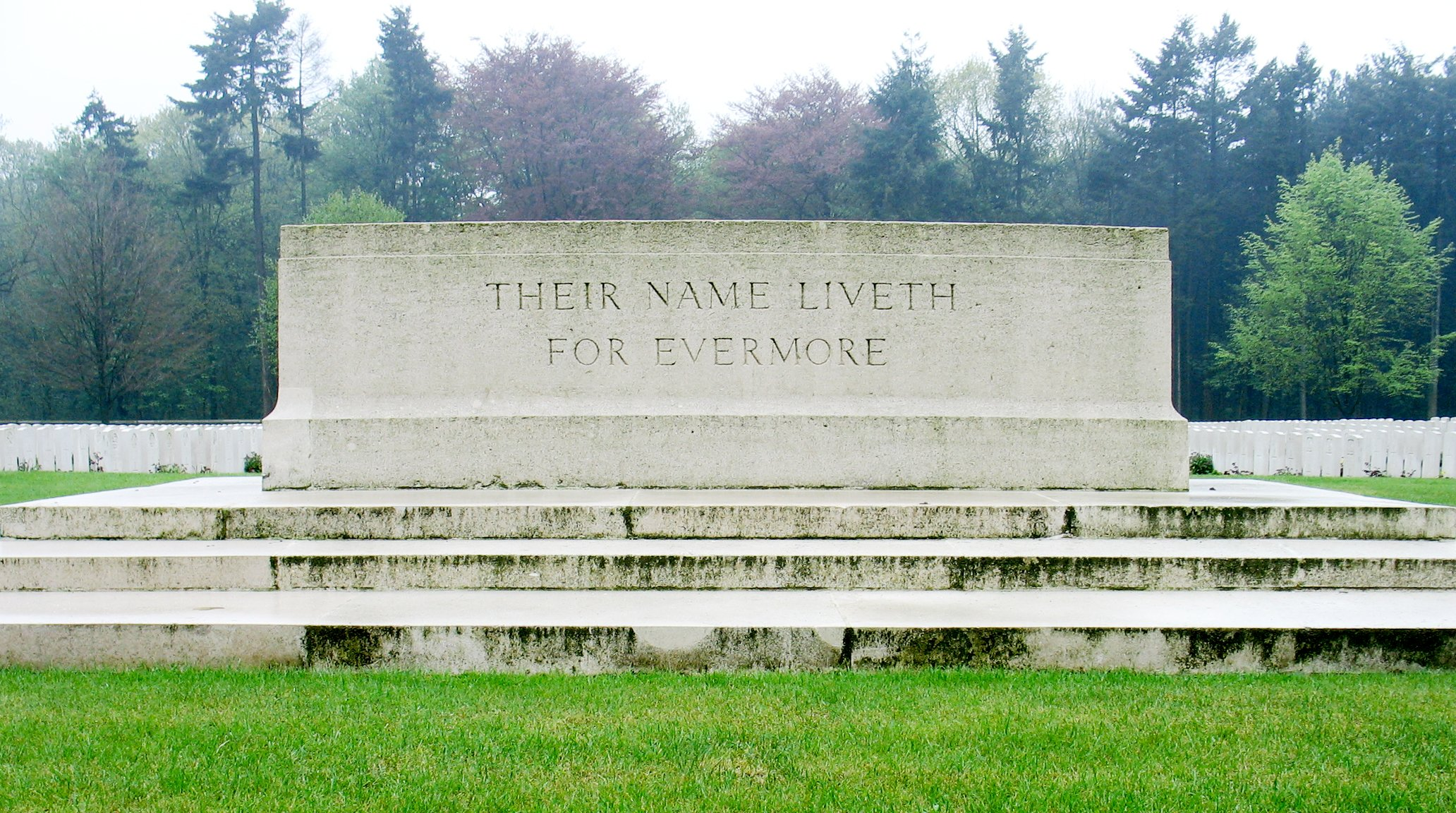
"Their name liveth for evermore" inscribed on the Stone of Remembrance at the Buttes New British Cemetery, in Belgium

"Their name liveth for evermore" is a phrase from the Book of Sirach, chapter 44, verse 14, widely inscribed on war memorials since the First World War. Although the Book of Sirach is not included in the Hebrew Bible, and therefore is not considered scripture in Judaism, it is included in the Septuagint and the Old Testament of the Catholic and Orthodox churches. In the Protestant traditions, historically, and still in continuation today in Lutheranism and Anglicanism, the Book of Sirach is an intertestamental text found in the Apocrypha, though it is regarded as noncanonical.

== Context ==
In full, verse 14 reads "Their bodies are buried in peace; but their name liveth for evermore." The chapter begins with the line "Let us now praise famous men, and our fathers that begat us." The full text of verse 14 was suggested by Rudyard Kipling as an appropriate inscription for memorials after the First World War, with the intention that it could be carved into the Stone of Remembrance proposed by Sir Edwin Lutyens for the Imperial (now Commonwealth) war cemeteries. Lutyens was initially opposed, concerned that someone might inappropriately add an "s" after "peace" ("peaces" being a homophone of "pieces"), but relented when the phrase was cut down to just the second part of the verse, omitting the reference to bodies resting in peace.

== Kipling's proposal based on Acts 15 ==
Rudyard Kipling also suggested the memorial phrase "Known unto God" for gravestones marking the resting place of unidentified or unknown soldiers, possibly taken from Acts 15, verse 18—"Known unto God are all his works from the beginning of the world". The memorial phrase "lest we forget" is taken from Kipling's poem "Recessional"—"Lord God of Hosts, be with us yet / Lest we forget—lest we forget!"
