= Won't Forget You (disambiguation) =

"Won't Forget You" is a 2022 song by Shouse.

Won't Forget You may also refer to:

- "Won't Forget You", a 2017 song by Pixie Lott featuring Stylo G
- Won't Forget You (single album), by Kim Sung-kyu, 2021
- "Won't Forget You", a 2023 single by Jax Jones with D.O.D. and Ina Wroldsen

== See also ==
- Never Forget You (disambiguation)
