= I'll Never Forget You =

I'll Never Forget You may refer to:

- I'll Never Forget You, 1951 U.S. film from 20th Century Fox, also known under its British title, The House in the Square
- "I'll Never Forget You", song by American punk rock band, Hüsker Dü, from their 1984 album, Zen Arcade
- "I'll Never Forget You", song by Francis and the Lights from their EP Striking, covered by Birdy on her self-titled album Birdy.

== See also ==
- Never Forget (disambiguation)
- Never Forget You (disambiguation)
