= Lest We Forget (1947 film) =

1947 film by the US Army

Lest We Forget is a 1947 military documentary produced by the U.S. Army and signal corps.

== Content ==
Consisting of newsreels and official government photos, the film shows American troops training during the War, the capture of Cherbourg, and the liberation of Paris .
