= Never again =

Phrase associated with the Holocaust

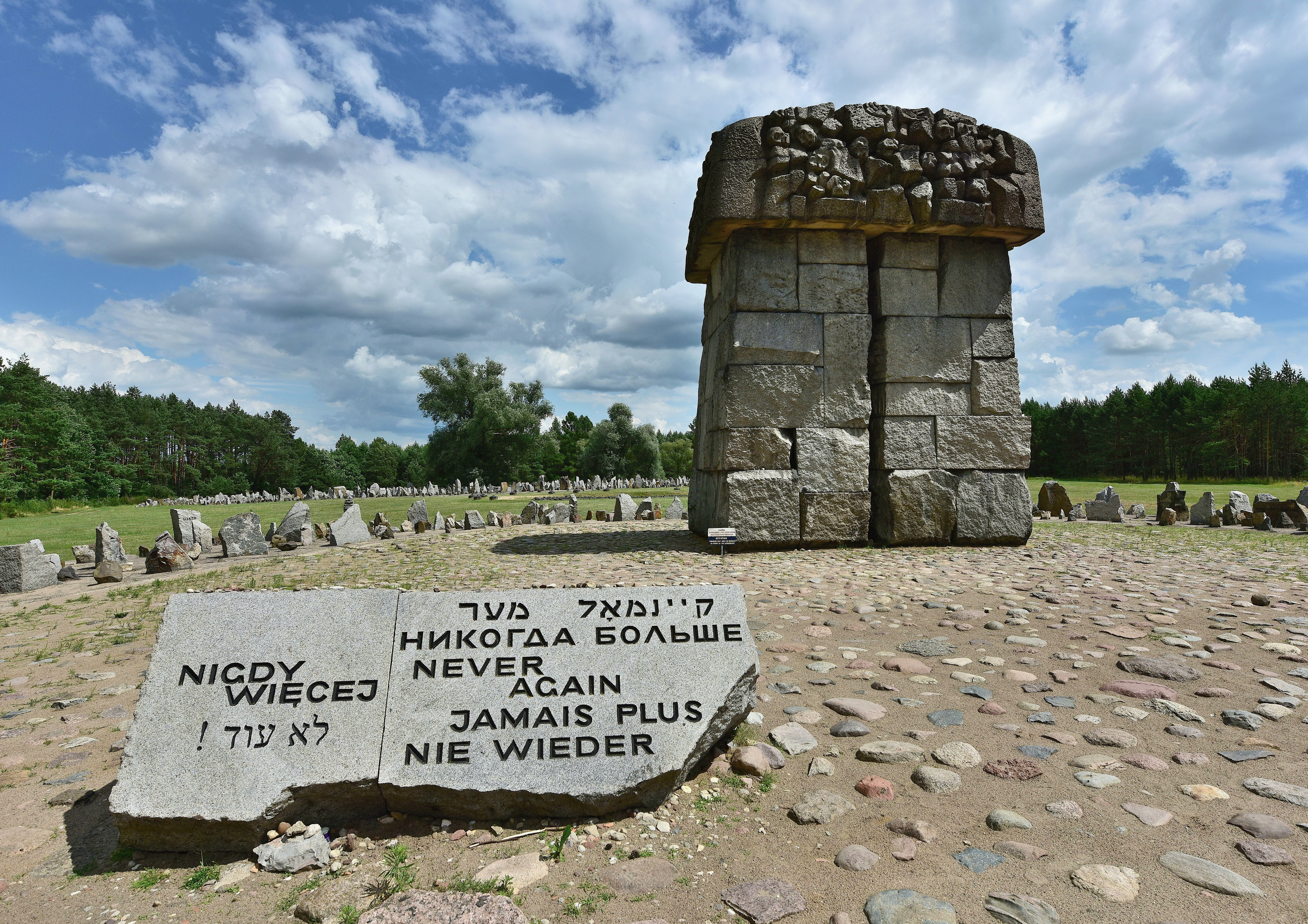
Multilingual "never again" memorial at Treblinka extermination camp

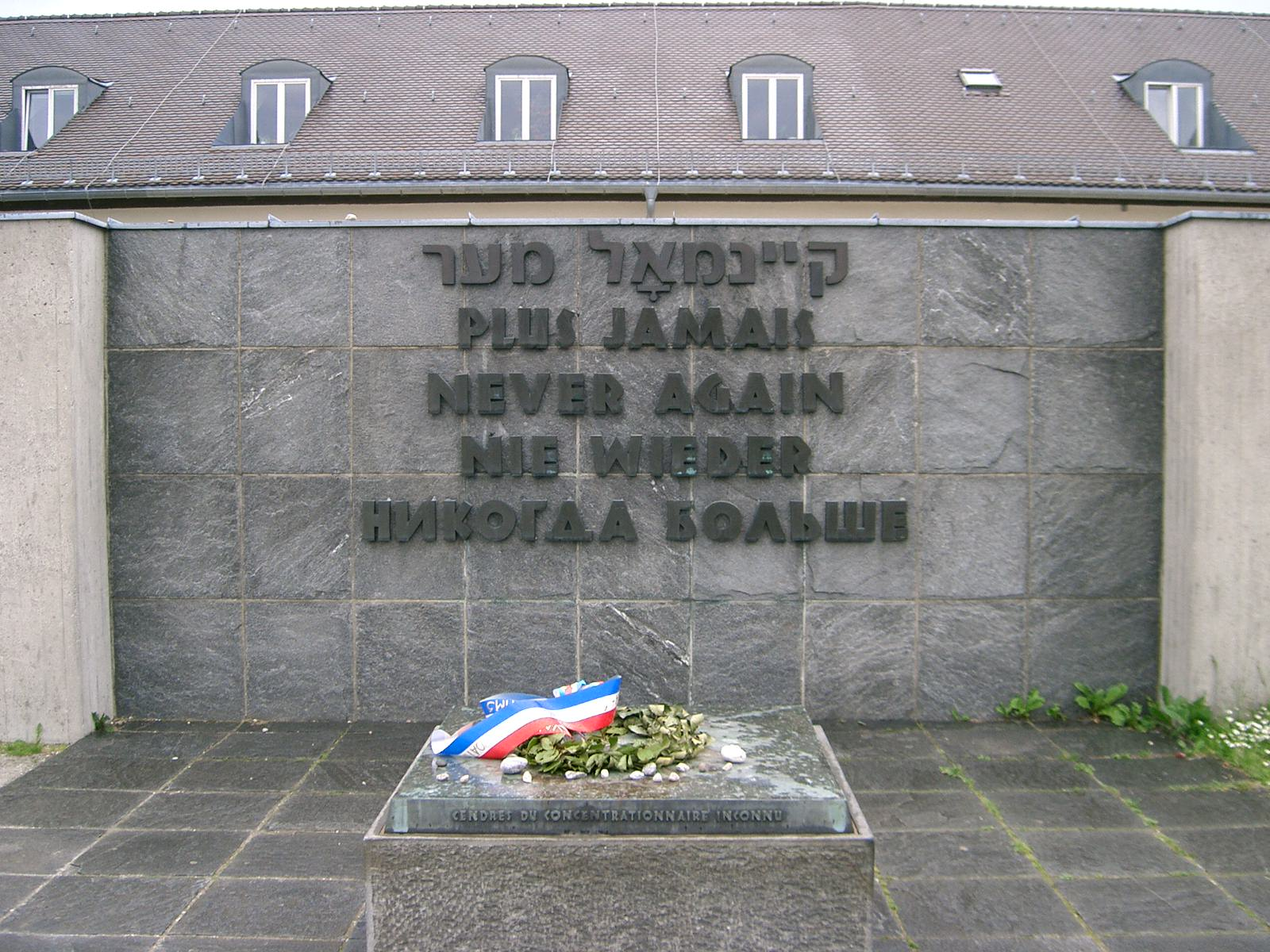
Multilingual "never again" memorial at Dachau concentration camp

"Never again" is a phrase or slogan associated with the Holocaust and genocide. The slogan was used by liberated prisoners at Buchenwald concentration camp to denounce fascism.

The exact meaning of the phrase is debated, including whether it should be used as a particularistic command to avert a second Holocaust of Jews or whether it is a universalist injunction to prevent all forms of genocide. It was popularized by far-right Jewish paramilitary leader Meir Kahane in his 1971 book, Never Again! A Program for Survival.

It has been widely used by politicians and writers, also appearing on many Holocaust memorials. It has also been utilized as a political slogan for other causes, from commemoration of the 1976 Argentine coup, the promotion of gun control or abortion rights, and as an injunction to war on terror after the September 11 attacks.

== Origins ==
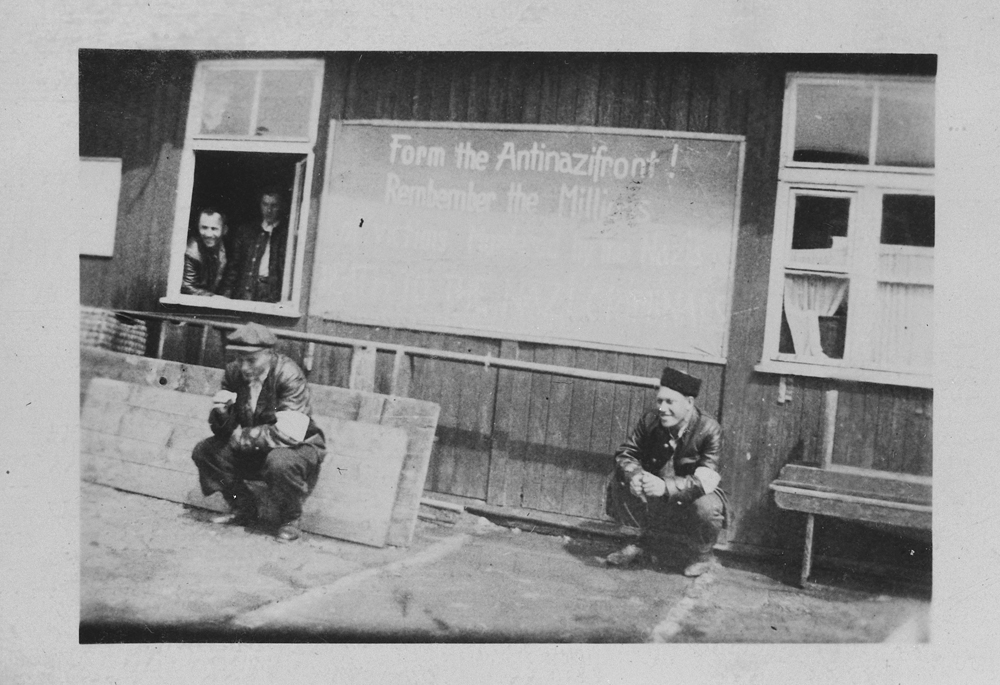
During the liberation of Buchenwald, a sign states "Form the Antinazifront! Remember the Millions of victims Murdered by the Nazis / DEATH TO THE NAZI CRIMINALS".

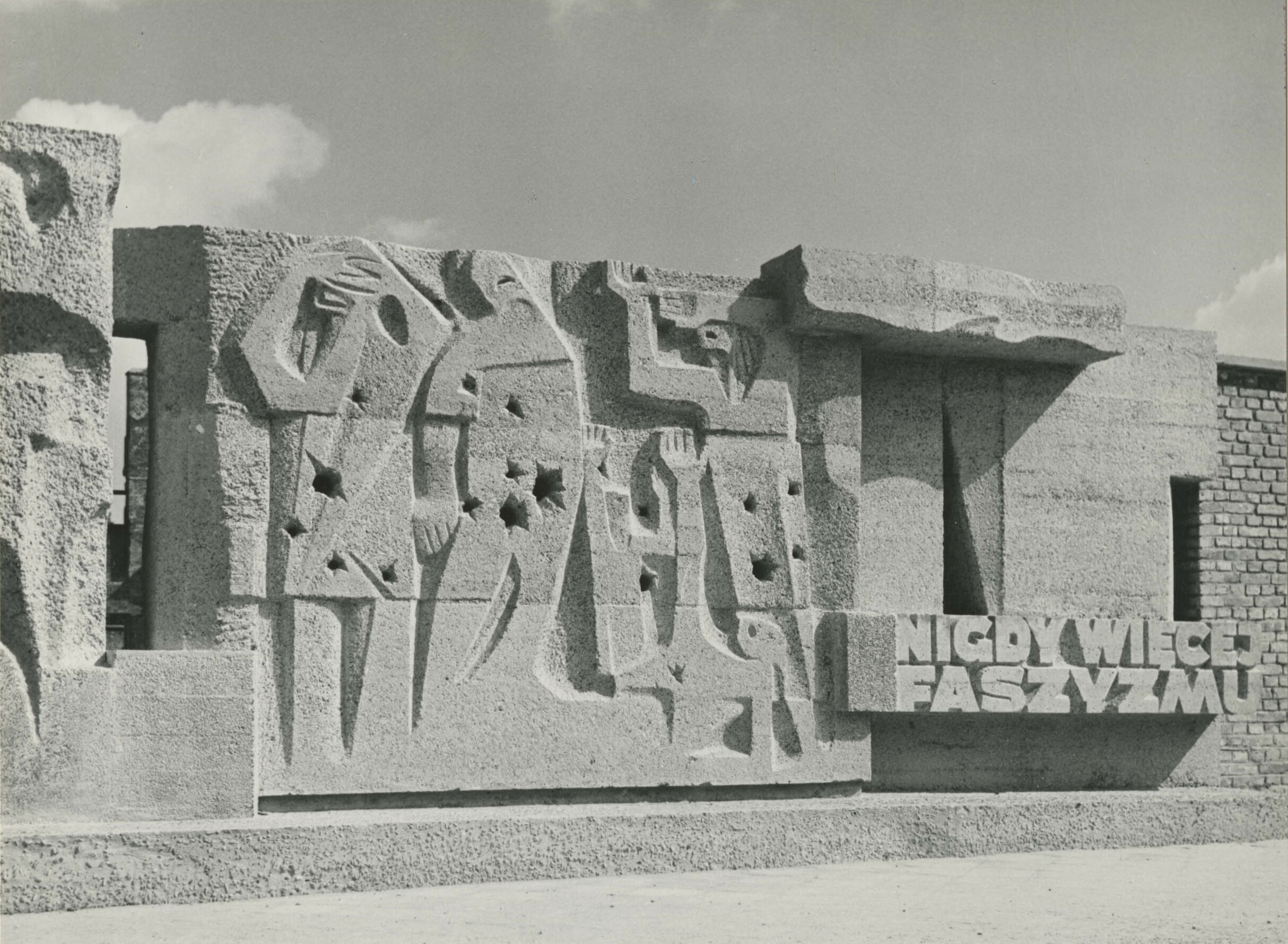
Memorial to Radogoszcz prison in Łódź states "Nigdy więcej faszyzmu" ("Never again to fascism").

The slogan "Never again shall Masada fall!" is believed to be derived from a 1927 epic poem, Masada, by Yitzhak Lamdan. The poem is about the siege of Masada, in which the Sicarii held out against Roman armies and, according to legend, committed mass suicide rather than be captured. In Zionism, an embellished version of the story of Masada became a national myth and was lauded as an example of Jewish heroism. Considered one of the most significant examples of early Yishuv literature, Masada achieved massive popularity among Zionists in the land of Israel and in the Jewish diaspora. The Masada myth became a part of the official Hebrew curriculum and the slogan became an unofficial national motto. In postwar Israel, the behavior of Jews during the Holocaust was unfavorably contrasted with the behavior of the defenders of Masada: the former were denigrated for having gone "like sheep to the slaughter" while the latter were praised for their heroic and resolute fight.

Between 1941 and 1945, Nazi Germany and its allies murdered about six million Jews in a genocide, which has become known as the Holocaust. The Nazi attempt to implement their final solution to the Jewish question took place during World War II in Europe. The first use of the phrase "never again" in the context of the Holocaust was in April 1945, when newly liberated survivors at Buchenwald concentration camp displayed it in various languages on handmade signs. Cultural studies scholars Diana I. Popescu and Tanja Schult write that there was initially a distinction between political prisoners, who invoked "never again" as part of their fight against fascism, and Jewish survivors, whose imperative was to "never forget" their murdered relatives and destroyed communities. They write that the distinction has been blurred in the subsequent decades as the Holocaust was universalised. According to the United Nations, the Universal Declaration of Human Rights was adopted in 1948 because "the international community vowed never again to allow" the atrocities of World War II, and the Genocide Convention was adopted the same year. Eric Sundquist notes that "the founding of Israel was predicated on the injunction to remember a history of destruction—the destruction of two Temples, exile and pogroms, and the Holocaust—and to ensure that such events will never happen again". The slogan "never again" was used on Israeli kibbutzim by the end of the 1940s, and was used in the Swedish documentary Mein Kampf in 1961.

== Definition ==
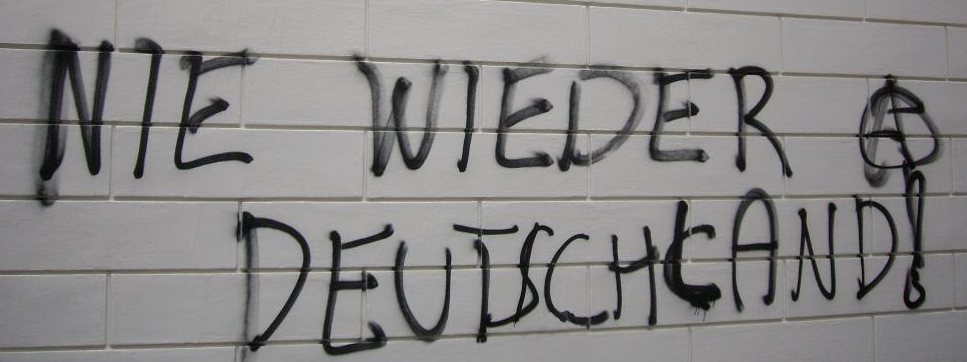
Never again Germany graffiti

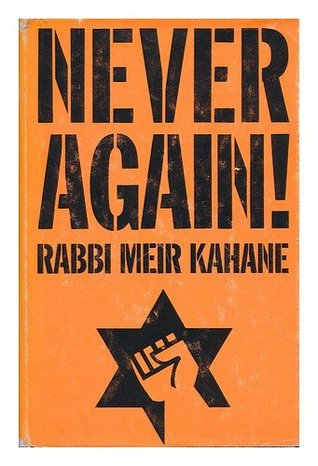
Never Again! A Program for Survival (1972)

Irit Dekel writes that "never again" is "a floating signifier—flexible enough to carry different meanings for different audiences while remaining specific enough to galvanize various political actions". According to Hans Kellner, "Unpacking the semantic contents of 'Never Again' would be an enormous task. Suffice it to say that this phrase, despite its non-imperative form as a speech act, orders someone to resolve that something shall not happen for a second time. The someone, in the first instance, is a Jew; the something is usually called the Holocaust." Kellner suggests that it is related to the "biblical imperative of memory" (zakhor), in Deuteronomy 5:15, "And remember that thou wast a servant in the land of Egypt, and that the Lord thy God brought thee out thence through a mighty hand and by a stretched out arm." (In the Bible, this refers to remembering and keeping Shabbat). It is also closely related to the biblical command in Exodus 23:9: "You shall not oppress a stranger, for you know the feelings of the stranger, having yourselves been strangers in the land of Egypt."

The initial meaning of the phrase, used by Abba Kovner and other Holocaust survivors, was particular to the Jewish community, but the phrase's meaning was later broadened to other genocides. It is still a matter of debate whether "Never again" refers primarily to Jews ("Never again can we allow Jews to be victims of another Holocaust") or whether it has a universal meaning ("Never again shall the world allow genocide to take place anywhere against any group"). However, most politicians use it in the latter sense. The phrase is used commonly in postwar German politics, but it has different meanings. According to one interpretation, because Nazism was a synthesis of preexisting aspects of German political thought and an extreme form of ethnic nationalism, all forms of German nationalism should be rejected. Other politicians argue that the Nazis "misused" appeals to patriotism and that a new German identity should be built.

Meir Kahane, a far-right rabbi, and his Jewish Defense League popularized the phrase. To Kahane and his followers, "Never again" referred specifically to the Jews and its imperative to fight antisemitism was a call to arms that justified terrorism against perceived enemies. The Jewish Defense League song included the passage "To our slaughtered brethren and lonely widows: / Never again will our people's blood be shed by water, / Never again will such things be heard in Judea." After Kahane's death in 1990, Sholom Comay, president of the American Jewish Committee, said "Meir Kahane must always be remembered for the slogan 'Never Again,' which for so many became the battle cry of post-Holocaust Jewry."

== Contemporary usage ==
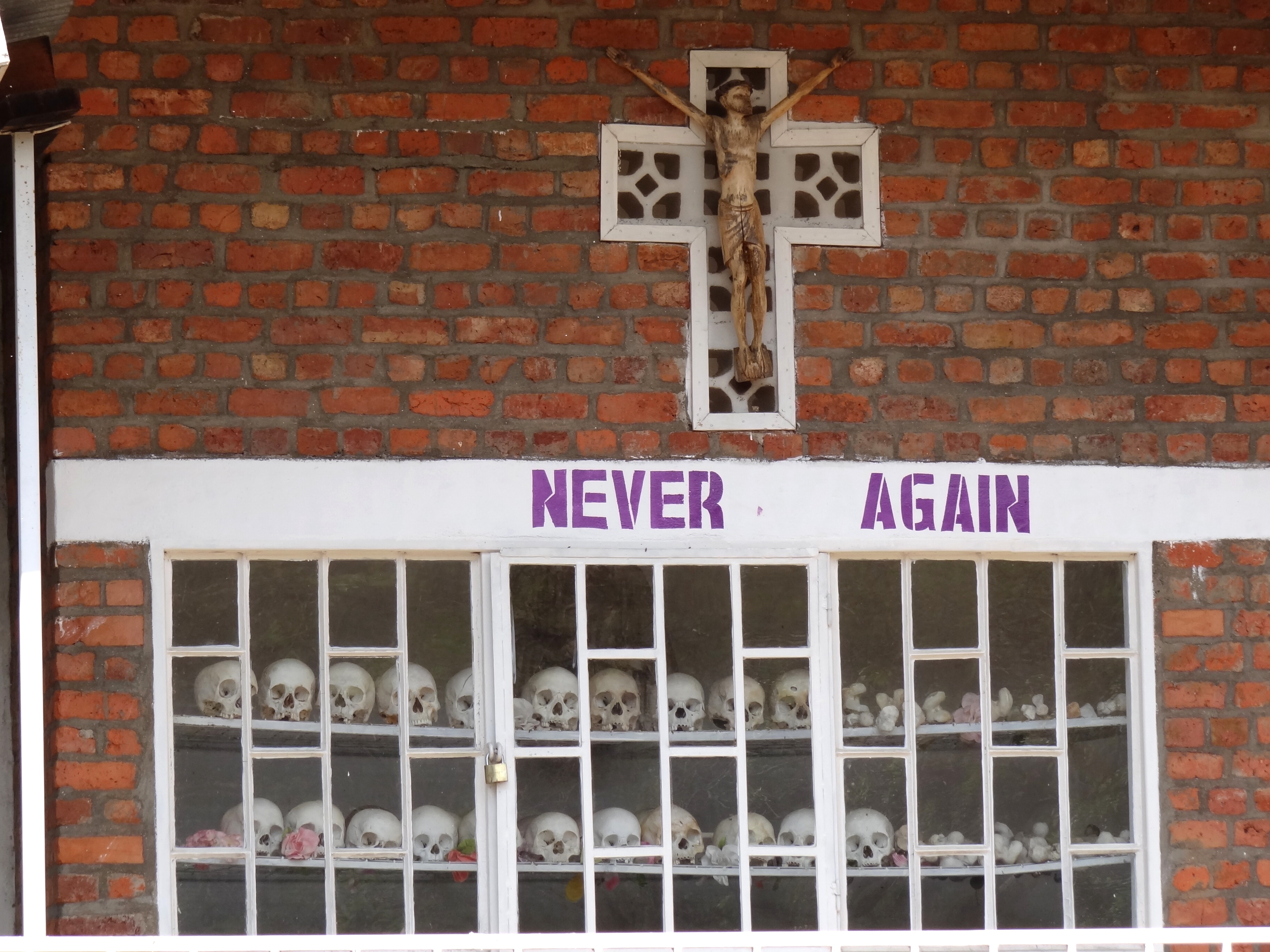
Never Again memorial to the Rwandan genocide

According to Aaron Dorfman, "Since the Holocaust, the Jewish community's attitude toward preventing genocide has been summed up in the moral philosophy of 'Never Again'". The phrase has been used in many official commemorations and appears on many Holocaust memorials and museums, including memorials at Treblinka extermination camp and Dachau concentration camp, as well as in commemoration of the Rwandan genocide. It is widely used by Holocaust survivors, politicians, writers, and other commentators, who invoke it for a variety of purposes.

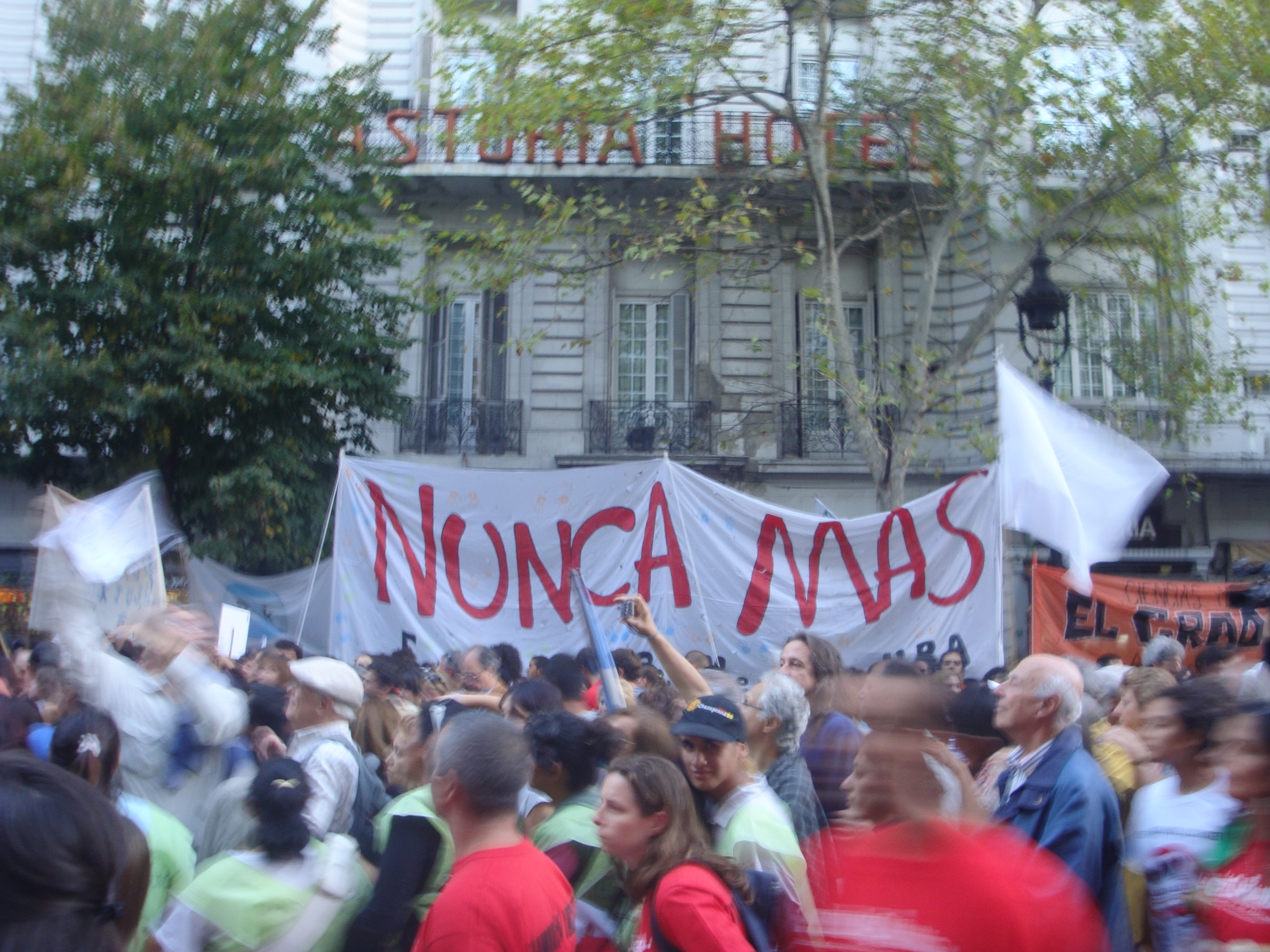
Demonstrators commemorate the 1976 Argentine coup in 2011.

For an increasing number of critics, the phrase has become empty and overused as genocides continue to occur, and condemnation of genocide tends to only occur after it is already over. Several commentators, including Adama Dieng, have noted that genocide has continued to occur, not never again but "time and again" or "again and again" after World War II. Some have even termed the end of mass atrocity crimes an unrealistic goal given the limitations of the international order. Multiple United States presidents, including Jimmy Carter in 1979, Ronald Reagan in 1984, George H. W. Bush in 1991, Bill Clinton in 1993, and Barack Obama in 2011, have promised that the Holocaust would not happen again, and that action would be forthcoming to stop genocide. However, genocide occurred during their presidencies: Cambodia in Carter's case, Anfal genocide during Reagan's presidency, Bosnia for Bush and Clinton, Rwanda under Clinton, and Yazidi for Obama. Elie Wiesel wrote that if "never again" were upheld "there would be no Cambodia, and no Rwanda and no Darfur and no Bosnia." Totten argued that the phrase would only recover its gravitas if "no one but those who are truly serious about preventing another Holocaust" invoked it.

In 2020, several critics of the Chinese government used the phrase to refer to the perceived lack of international reaction to the persecution of Uyghurs in China. On 1 March 2022, after the Babi Yar Holocaust Memorial Center was hit by Russian missiles and shells during the battle of Kyiv, Ukraine's President Volodymyr Zelenskyy argued that "never again" means not being silent about Russia's aggression.

The European Union was founded with the goal of anathemizing war on the European continent. According to political scientists C. Nicolai L. Gellwitzki and Anne-Marie Houde, the European Union serves a role as a "sacred political myth" for Germany, upholding a "utopian vision of the possibility of atonement and redemption" and providing an identity unencumbered by the Nazi past. The phrase "Never again," integral to Germany's post-Holocaust identity, sparked debate during the Gaza war. Intellectuals, including members of the Frankfurt School of neo-Marxist critical theory, disagreed over its scope. Some argued it should warn against potential genocides globally, including in Gaza. Conversely, Jürgen Habermas and co-authors emphasized its primary role in protecting Jewish life and Israel, deeming comparisons of Israel's actions to genocide as inappropriate.

In 2025, A. Dirk Moses, Nils Gilman, and Zachariah Mampilly published an article arguing that "the imperative of 'never again' that lies at the center of global Holocaust memory culture has become a template for geopolitical entrepreneurs"—spearheaded by Israel and Rwanda—"to challenge the injunction against violent territorial expansion", which they undertook under the guise of preventing atrocities. They cite Russia's accusations of genocide against Ukraine cited to justify its 2022 invasion as an example of how this argument has spread internationally. While according to Omer Bartov, Israelis afflicted with the "never again syndrome" see all threats and opposition as a sign of a second Holocaust which in turn justifies "again and again" oppression towards Palestinians.

In September 2025, Holocaust Museum LA shared a post in its Instagram page saying "Never again can't only mean never again for Jews". The Instagram message was initially praised online, with some interpreting it as an acknowledgement of the Gaza genocide, but also faced intense criticism from pro-Israel activists. The post was later taken down and replaced by a statement that stated it had been misinterpreted. The museum quickly faced criticism online after journalist Ryan Grim reposted a screenshot of the message that had been deleted, writing: "Speechless. No words for this."

== Other uses ==
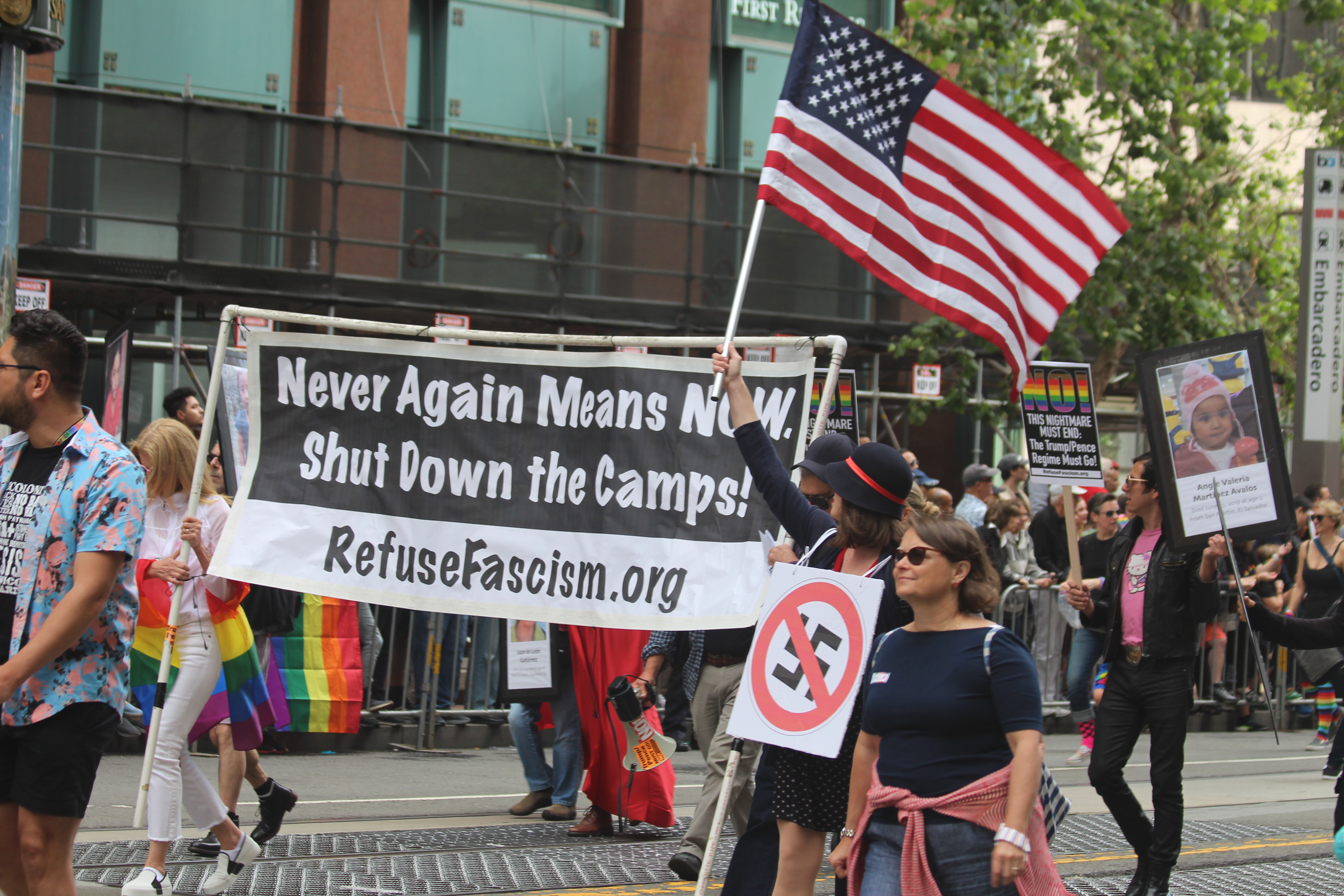
Protest against immigration detention in the United States

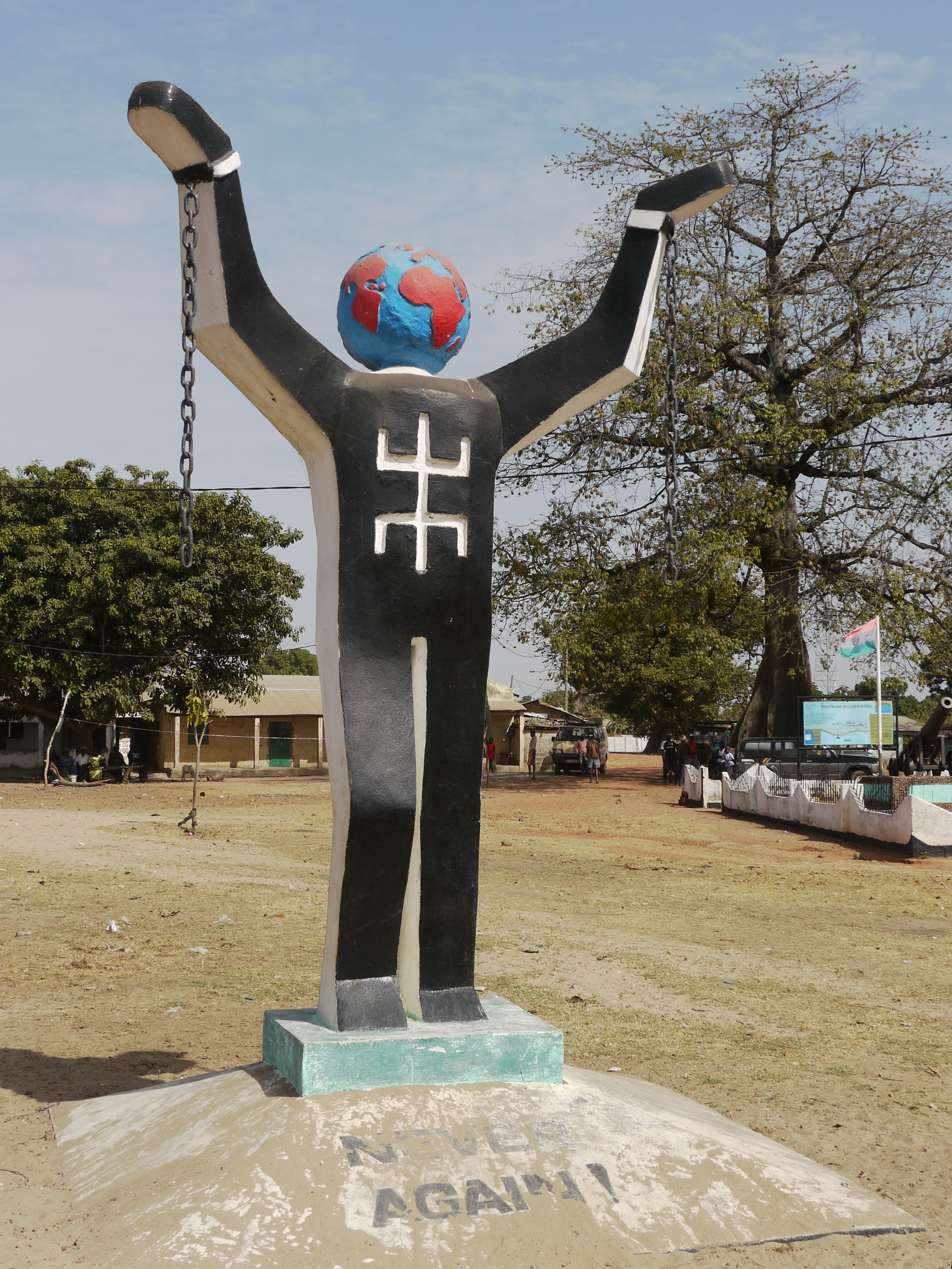
Statue on Kunta Kinteh Island, The Gambia, commemorating the end of the Atlantic slave trade; it bears the slogan "NEVER AGAIN!"

The rationale of "never again" also fueled the formation of truth commissions in Latin America in the aftermath of military coups, dictatorship, and political violence, in the intent that memory would prevent a reoccurrence. The Argentine truth commission and its 1984 report entitled Nunca más were a model for similar efforts elsewhere. The slogan Nunca más is still used in annual commemorations of the 1976 Argentine coup. In Brazil, "never again" has been used as a motif by groups that opposed the Brazilian military dictatorship since the 1980s, starting with the book Brazil: Never Again, the human rights organisation Torture Never Again, and the monument of the same name.

In the Philippines, "never again" has been used as a rallying cry for the commemoration and remembrance of martial law under Ferdinand Marcos, and is usually chanted alongside the phrase "never forget" on occasions such as the annual commemorations of the declaration of martial law on September 21, and on the anniversary of the People Power Revolution on February 25, which is a public holiday in the country.

"Never again" has also been used in commemoration of Japanese American internment and the Chinese Exclusion Act.

After the September 11 attacks, President George W. Bush declared that terrorism would be allowed to triumph "never again". He referenced the phrase when defending the trial of non-citizens in military courts for terrorism-related offenses and mass surveillance policies adopted by his administration. Bush commented, "Foreign terrorists and agents must never again be allowed to use our freedoms against us." His words echoed a speech that his father had given after winning the Gulf War: "never again be held hostage to the darker side of human nature".

The phrase has been used by political advocacy groups Never Again Action, which opposes immigration detention in the United States, and by Never Again MSD, a group that campaigns against gun violence in the wake of the Stoneman Douglas shooting.

Never again is also used in climate activism to compare the inaction of governments to the rise of Nazism to their lack of action in reducing greenhouse gas emissions.

== See also ==
- Responsibility to protect
- The war to end war
- Never Forget (disambiguation)
- Lest we forget
- Holocaust trivialization
- Holocaust uniqueness debate
- IHRA definition of antisemitism
