= Stone of Remembrance =

Cenotaph in IWBC cemeteries

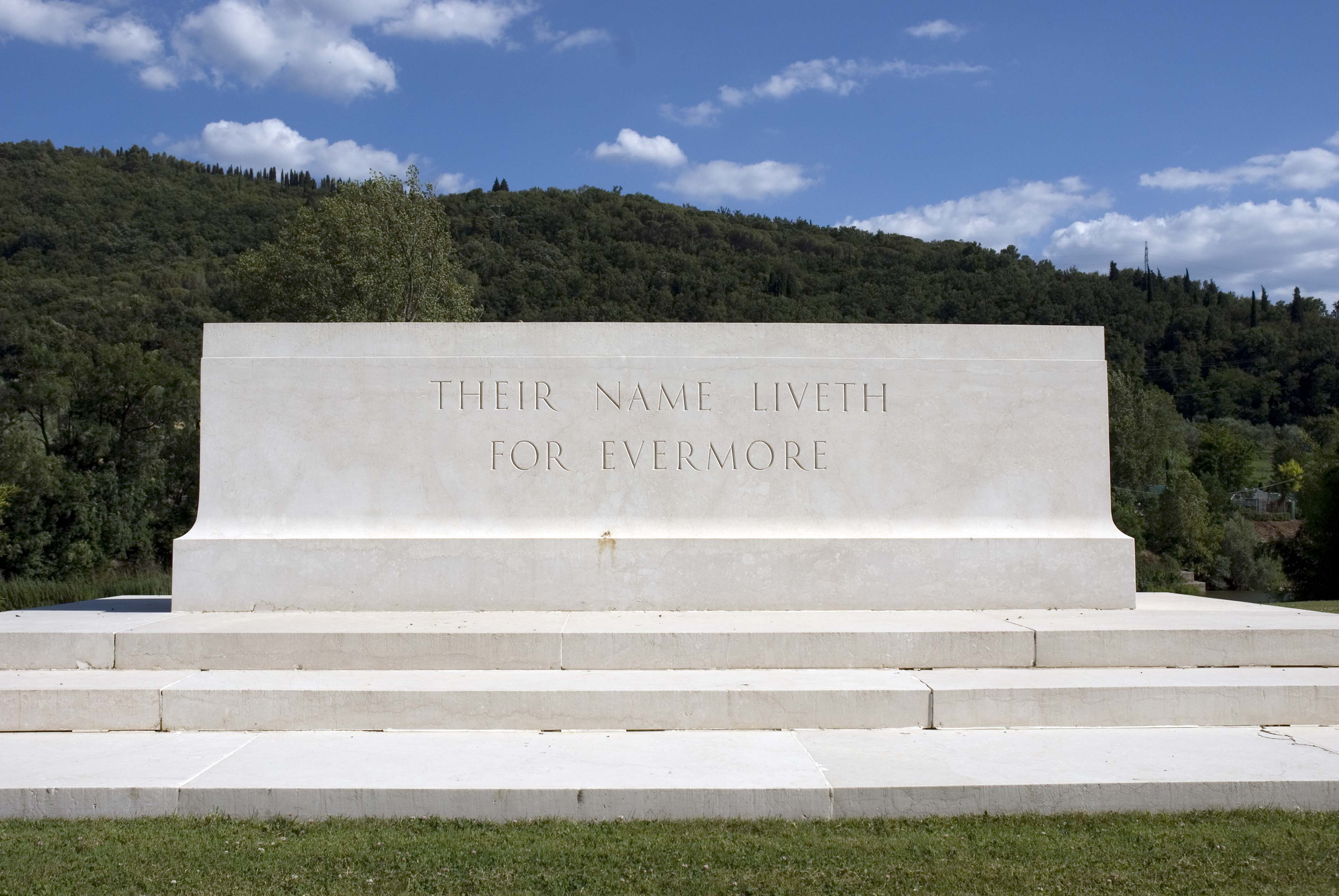
Florence War Cemetery in Italy

The Stone of Remembrance is a standardised design for war memorials that was designed in 1917 by the British architect Sir Edwin Lutyens for the Imperial War Graves Commission (IWGC). (Note: The Imperial War Graves Commission was renamed as the Commonwealth War Graves Commission in 1960.) It was designed to commemorate the dead of World War I, to be used in IWGC war cemeteries containing 1,000 or more graves, or at memorial sites commemorating more than 1,000 war dead. Hundreds were erected following World War I, and it has since been used in cemeteries containing the Commonwealth dead of World War II as well. It is intended to commemorate those "of all faiths and none", and has been described as one of Lutyens' "most important and powerful works", with a "brooding, sentinel-like presence wherever used".

== Design ==
The initial thoughts for the design were sent by Lutyens in letters and memoranda in May and August 1917 to Fabian Ware, the founder and head of the Imperial War Graves Commission, before and after the period in which Lutyens and other architects visited the wartime cemeteries in France in July 1917 at the request of Ware, to give their initial thoughts on what should be done to commemorate the dead:

On platforms made of not less than three steps... place one great stone of fine proportion 12 feet long and finely wrot – without undue ornament and tricky and elaborate carvings – and inscribe thereon one thought in clear letters so that all men for all times may read and know the reason why these stones are placed throughout France – facing the West and facing the men who lie looking ever eastward towards the enemy.

— Letter from Lutyens to Ware in May 1917, quoted from Lutyens and the Great War (2009)

Part of the design is the three-stepped platform on which each stone rests. Architectural historian Gavin Stamp, in Silent Cities (1977), quotes further from Lutyen's 1917 correspondence with Ware, where Lutyens describes the proposed stone as:

...one great fair stone of fine proportions, twelve feet in length, lying raised upon three steps, of which the first and third shall be twice the width of the second.

— Memorandum from Lutyens to Ware in August 1917, quoted from Silent Cities (1977)

In a later work in 2006, Stamp identifies a similarly abstract and geometrical concept that was part of Lutyens' creative process, citing a letter that Lutyens wrote to his wife while on the July 1917 visit to France, describing how a 'solid ball of bronze' could be used to make a permanent monument.

By the time of Ware's 1937 report, published as The Immortal Heritage the same year, some 560 Stones of Remembrance had been erected for World War I cemeteries and memorials in France and Belgium alone.

== Symbolism ==
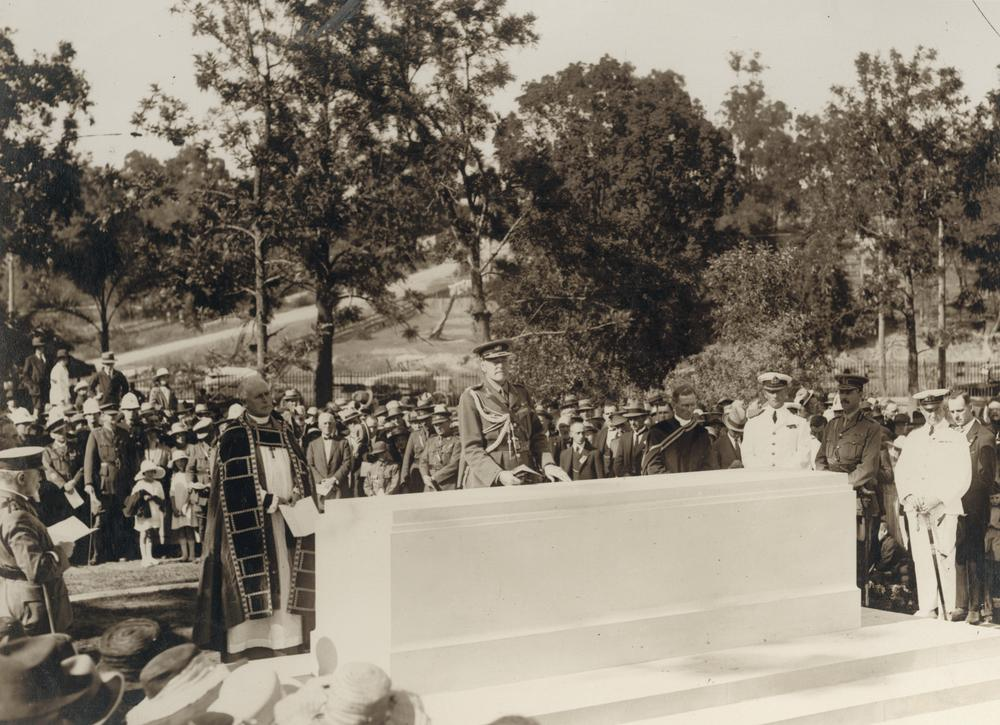
Unveiling ceremony for a Stone of Remembrance in 1924

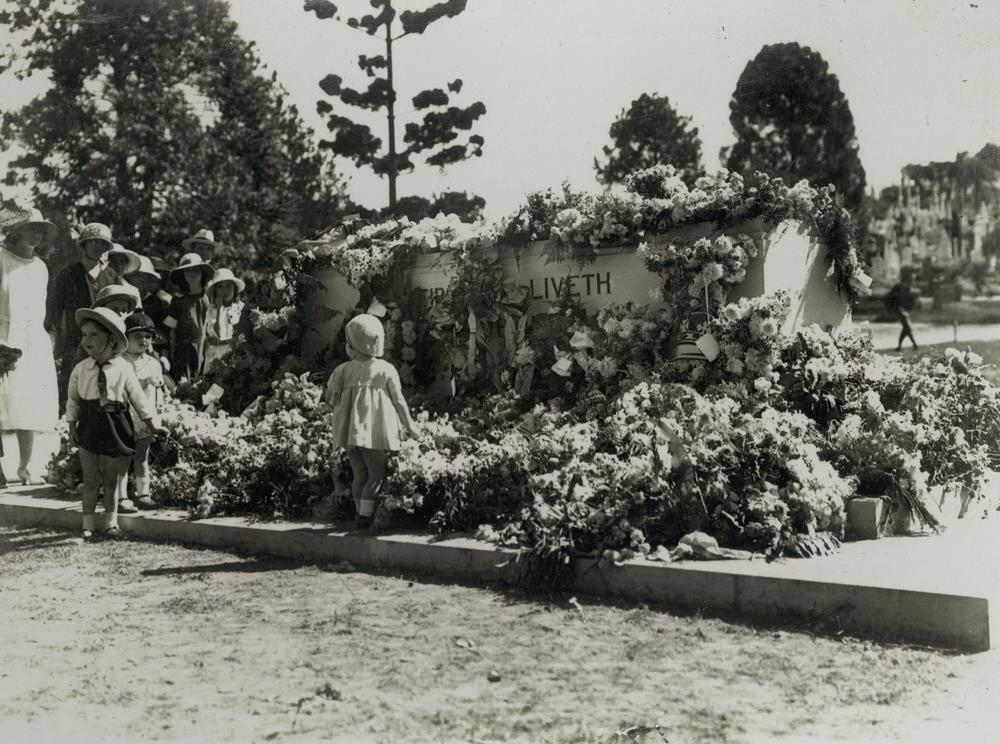
Children with a wreath-laden Stone of Remembrance on Anzac Day in 1924

The Stone of Remembrance is one of the standard architectural features of Commonwealth War Graves Commission cemeteries and memorials, the other being the Cross of Sacrifice by Sir Reginald Blomfield. In contrast, the design for the Stone deliberately avoided "shapes associated with particular religions". The shape of the Stone has been compared both to that of a sarcophagus and an altar, (Note: Those referring to the Stone as an altar included Lutyens himself, who was reported by Stamp (2006) to have written to the Archbishop of Canterbury in 1923 saying that he was pleased to see that a newspaper report had described a "Great War Stone" being "used as an Altar for the administration of Holy Communion". Lutyens also referred to his design as an altar in correspondence with Ware, as reported by Skelton and Gliddon (2009) from the CWGC archives of minutes from a meeting held in France in July 1917, where Lutyens proposed: '[a] monolithic Altar [...] which should appeal to every feeling and denomination'.) but was always intended to be abstract and appeal to all denominations.

There was, however, controversy over the symbolism, both during the design and approval process and subsequently. Lutyens and those supporting the concept of secular architecture and equality of remembrance (including Ware) had to contend with those (including other architects advising the Commission and Anglican bishops) who wanted the overt Christian symbolism of a cross, or who objected to the pagan overtones of the proposed Stone. Lutyens corresponded with a wide variety of people to gain support for his idea. Eventually (by January 1918), the decision to use both Cross and Stone was taken, and the two designs were adopted in different ways. Blomfield's Cross was built in different sizes according to the size of the cemetery, with Lutyens' Stone staying the same size but not being used in the smaller cemeteries (of less than 1,000 burials) where it was thought it would overwhelm the setting.

== Geometry ==
The geometry of the stone structure was "based on studies of the Parthenon". According to the Australian Government Department of Veterans' Affairs each stone is 3.5 metres long and 1.5 metres high. (Note: Although as noted above, Lutyens himself specified that the length should be 12 feet (3.66 metres).) It was designed using the principle of entasis. This involved incorporating subtle curves into the design, so that the stone does not have straight sides, but has circular lines that if extended would form a sphere 1,801 feet and 8 inches (549.15 metres) in diameter. The effect of the stone monument has been attributed to its geometry: "...its curious power and symbolic strength derive from its careful proportions and the application of a subtle entasis to all its surfaces."

== Inscription ==
The phrase inscribed on the stone, one of several suggested during the design phase, was proposed by the British author, poet and Nobel laureate Rudyard Kipling, whose only son had died in the war. Kipling's role was to advise the IWGC (now CWGC) on inscriptions and other literary matters, and the phrase used on the Stones of Remembrance is a quote from the Wisdom of Sirach. (Ecclesiasticus 44:14)

THEIR NAME LIVETH FOR EVERMORE

== Gallery ==
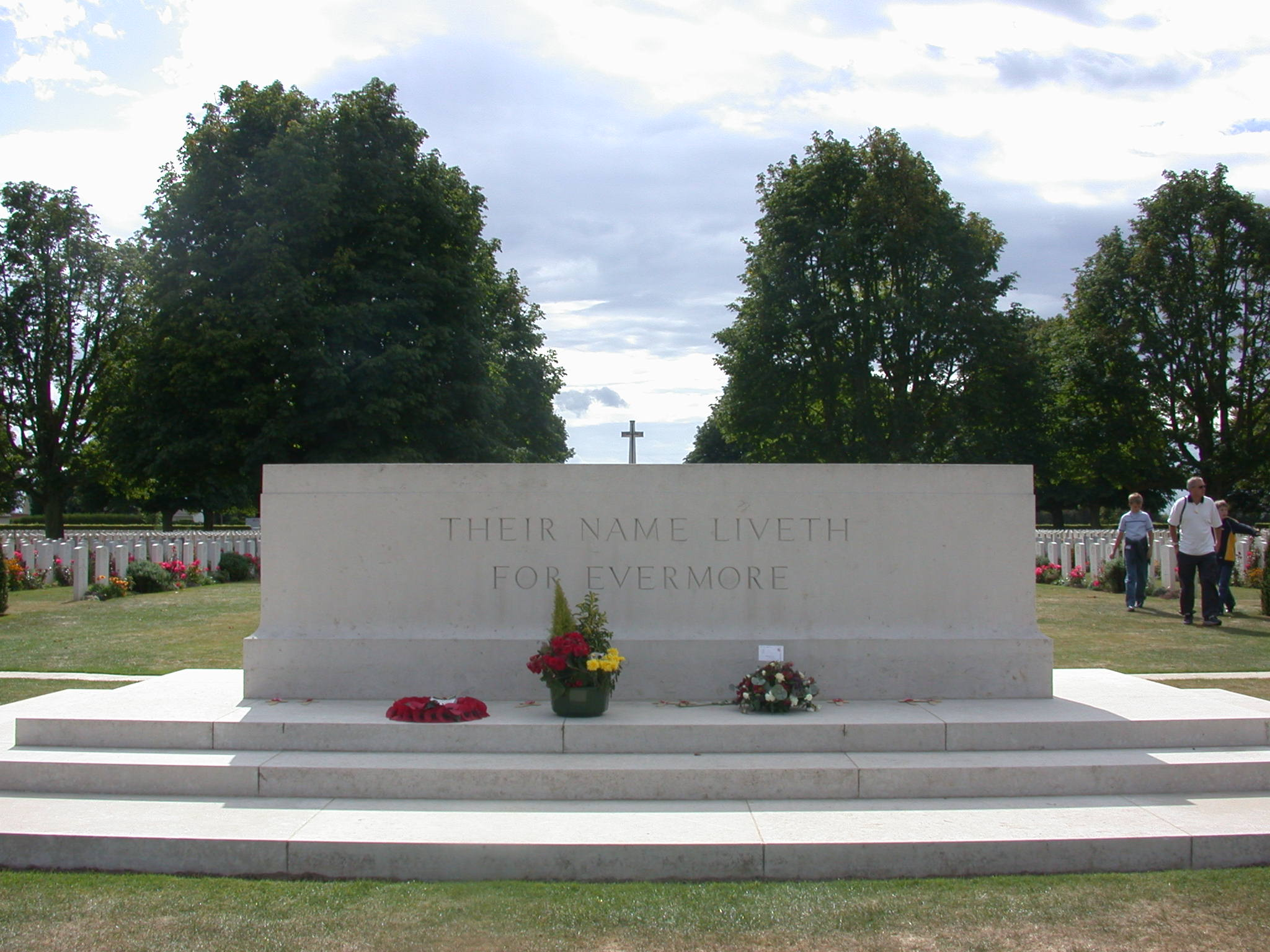
Bretteville-sur-Laize Cemetery

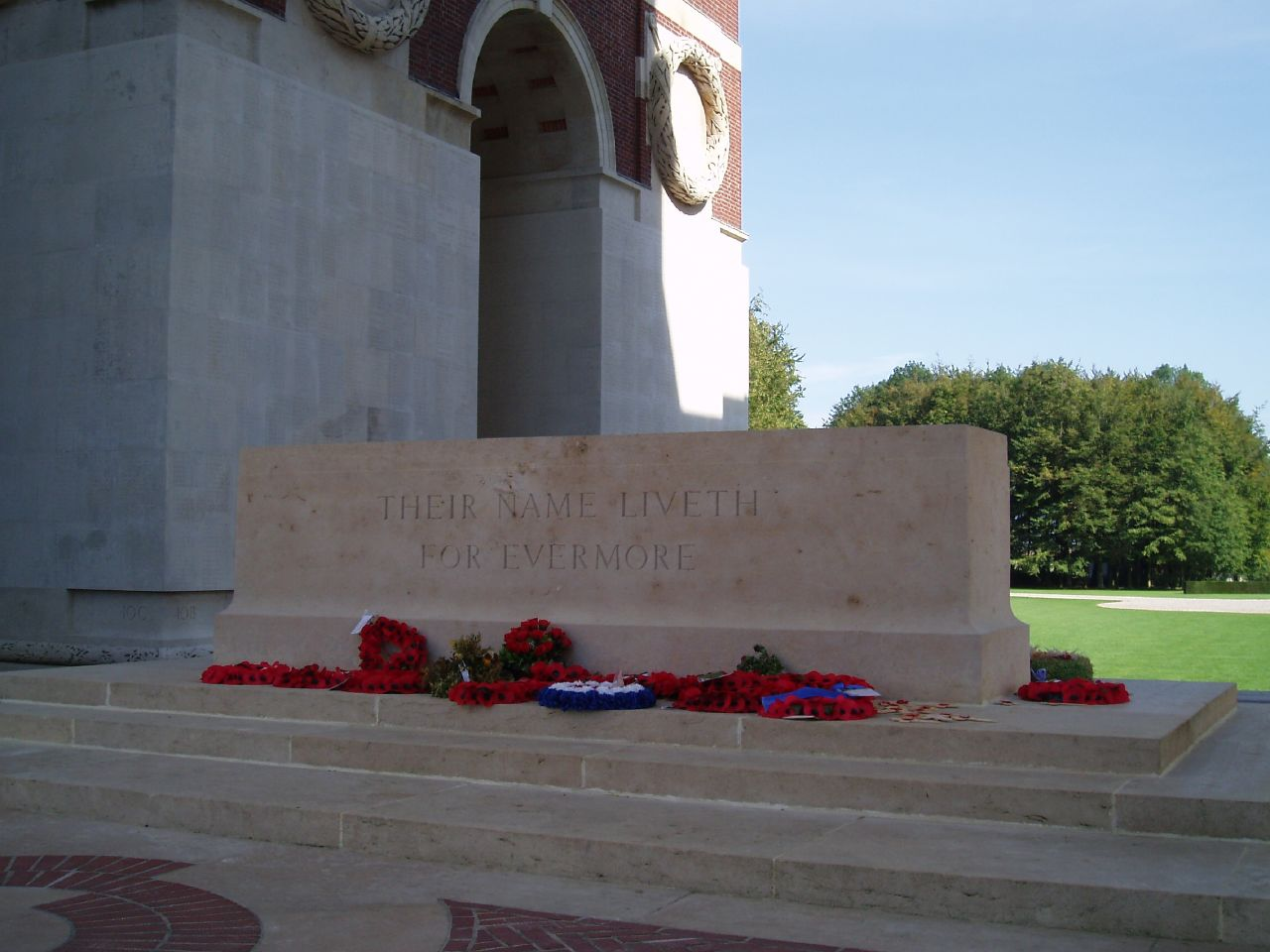
Thiepval Memorial

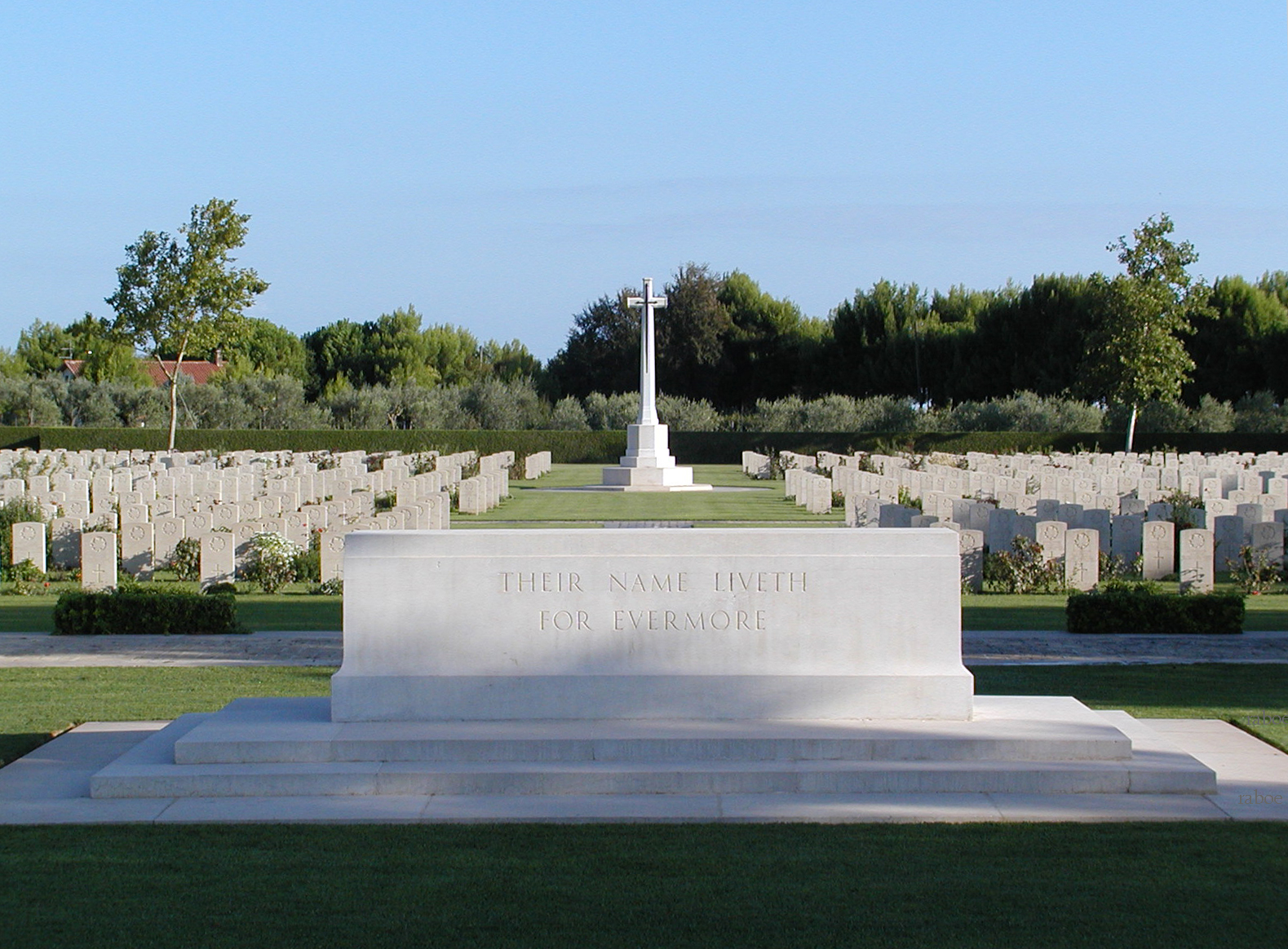
Ortona Cemetery

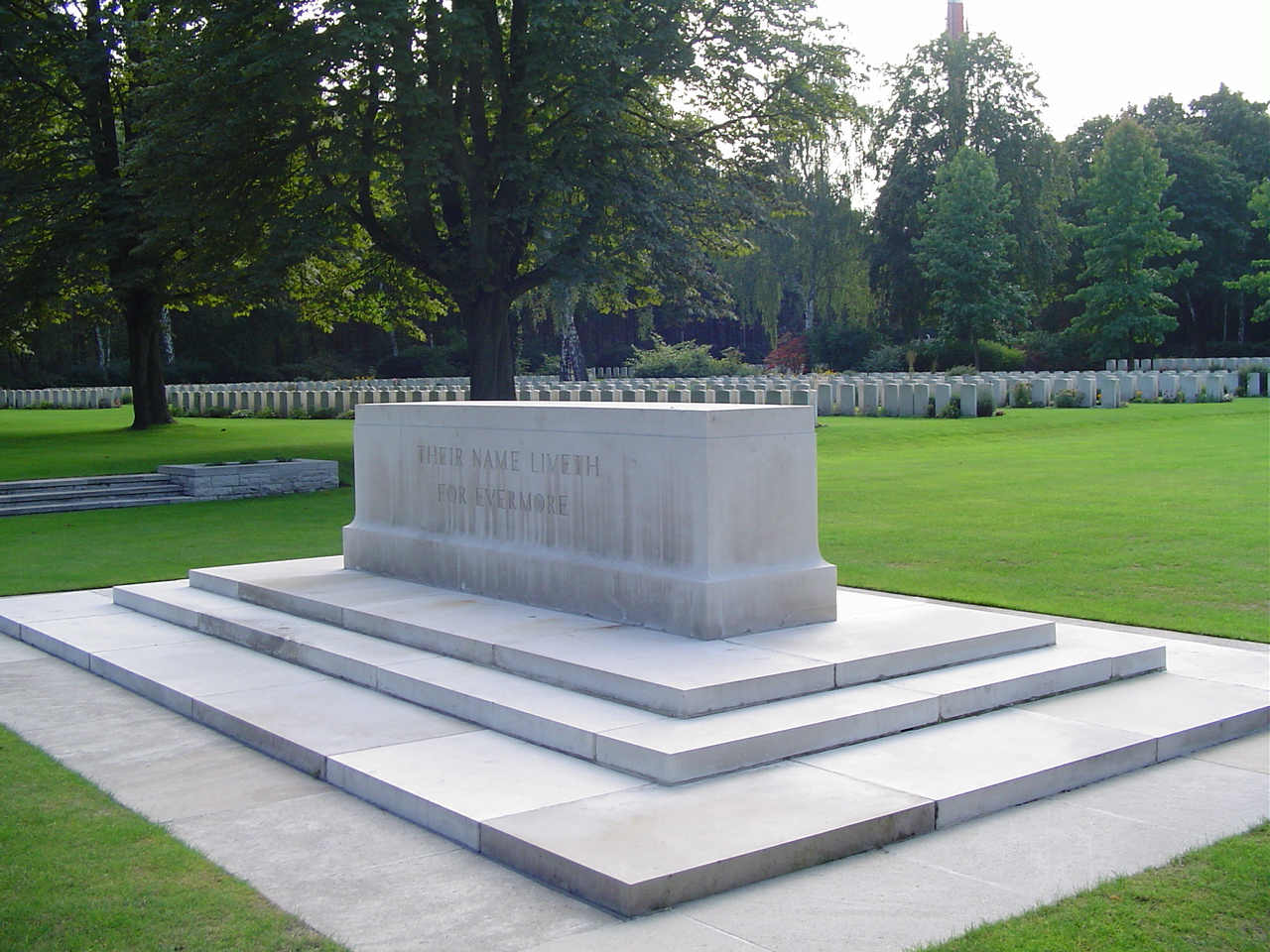
Berlin War Cemetery

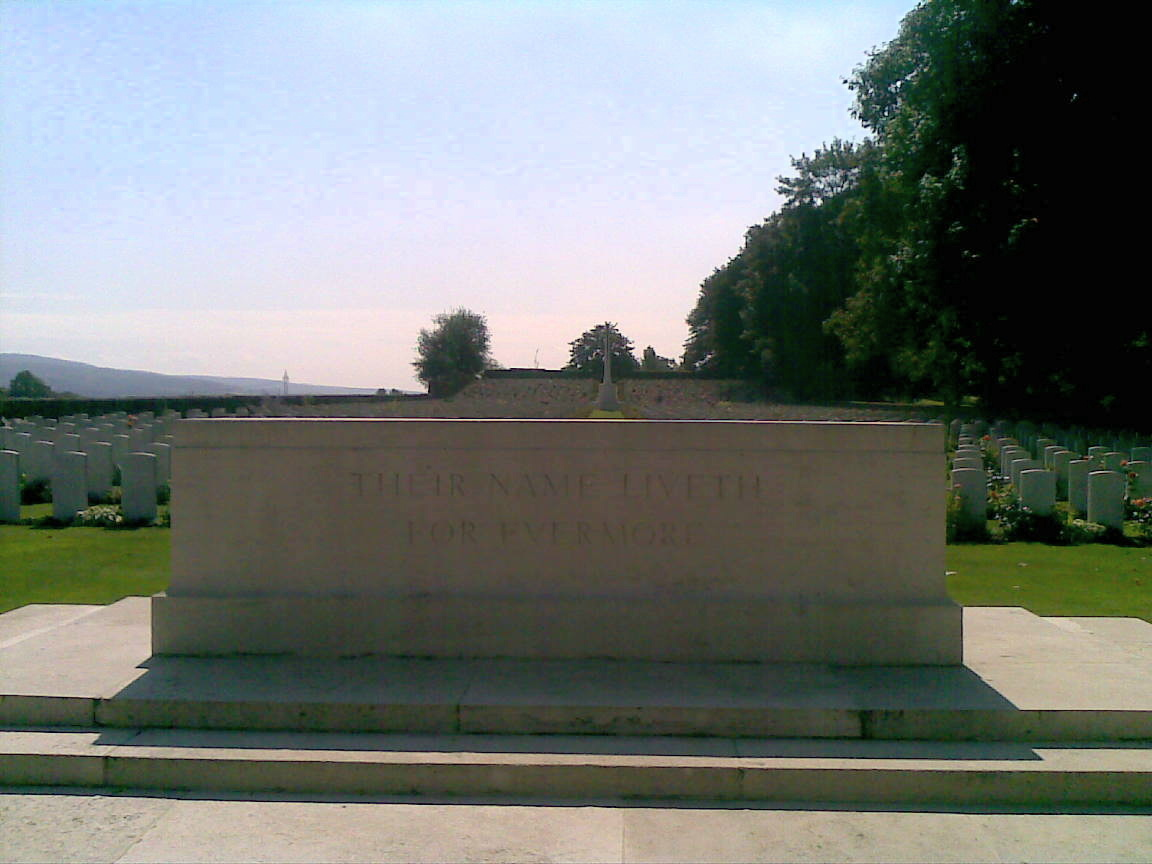
Niederzwehren Cemetery

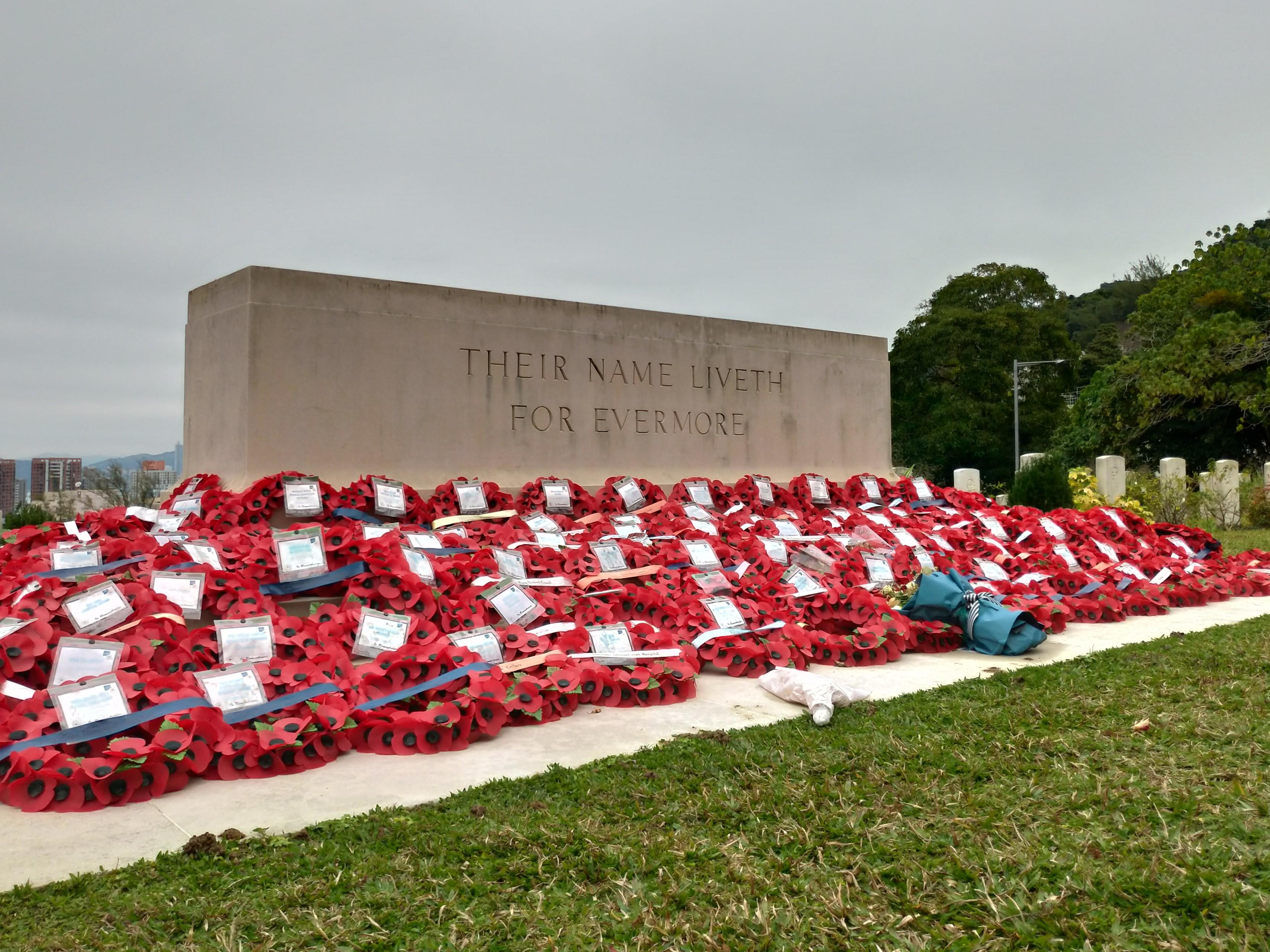
Sai Wan War Cemetery, Hong Kong

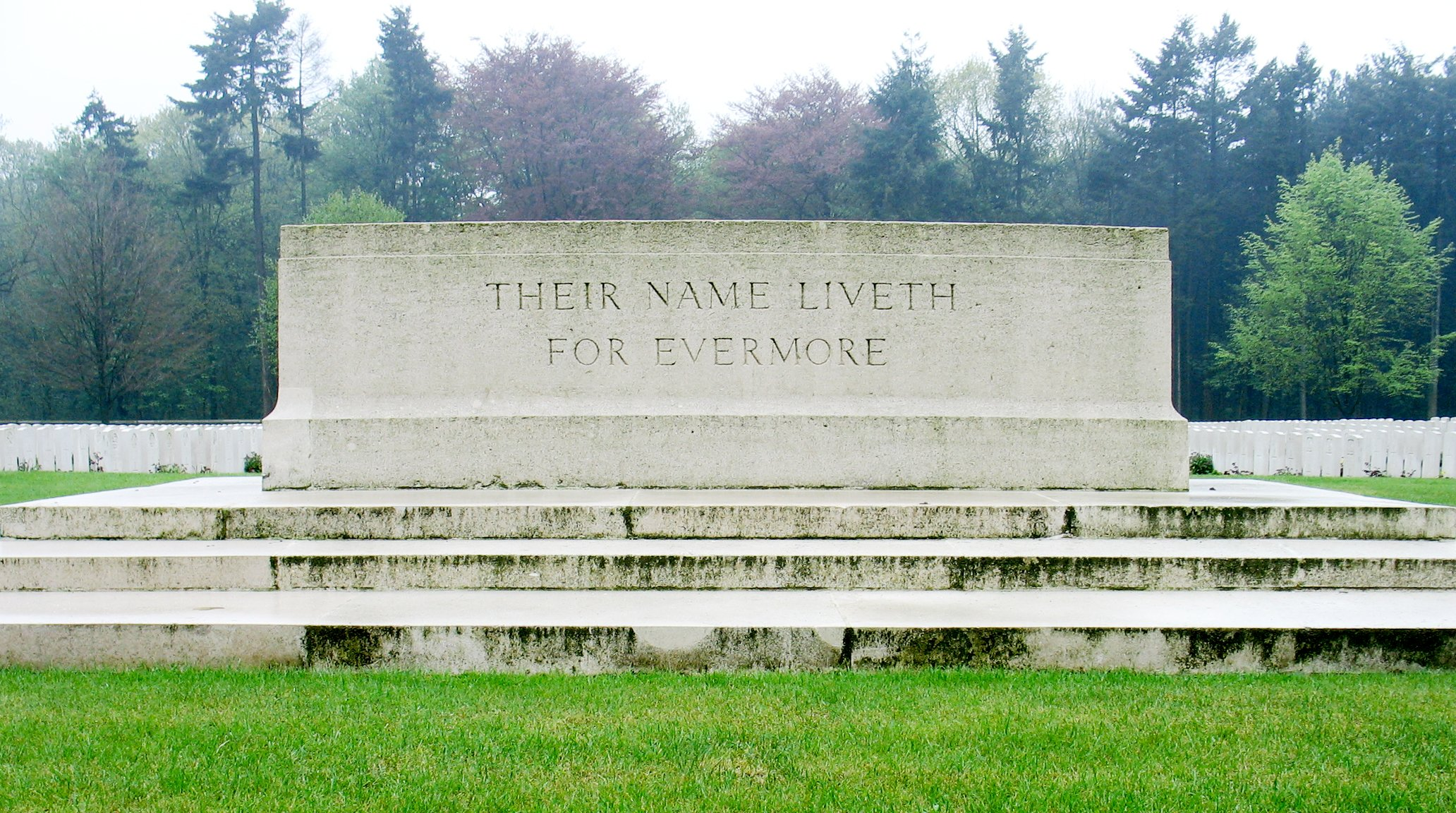
Buttes New British Cemetery, Belgium

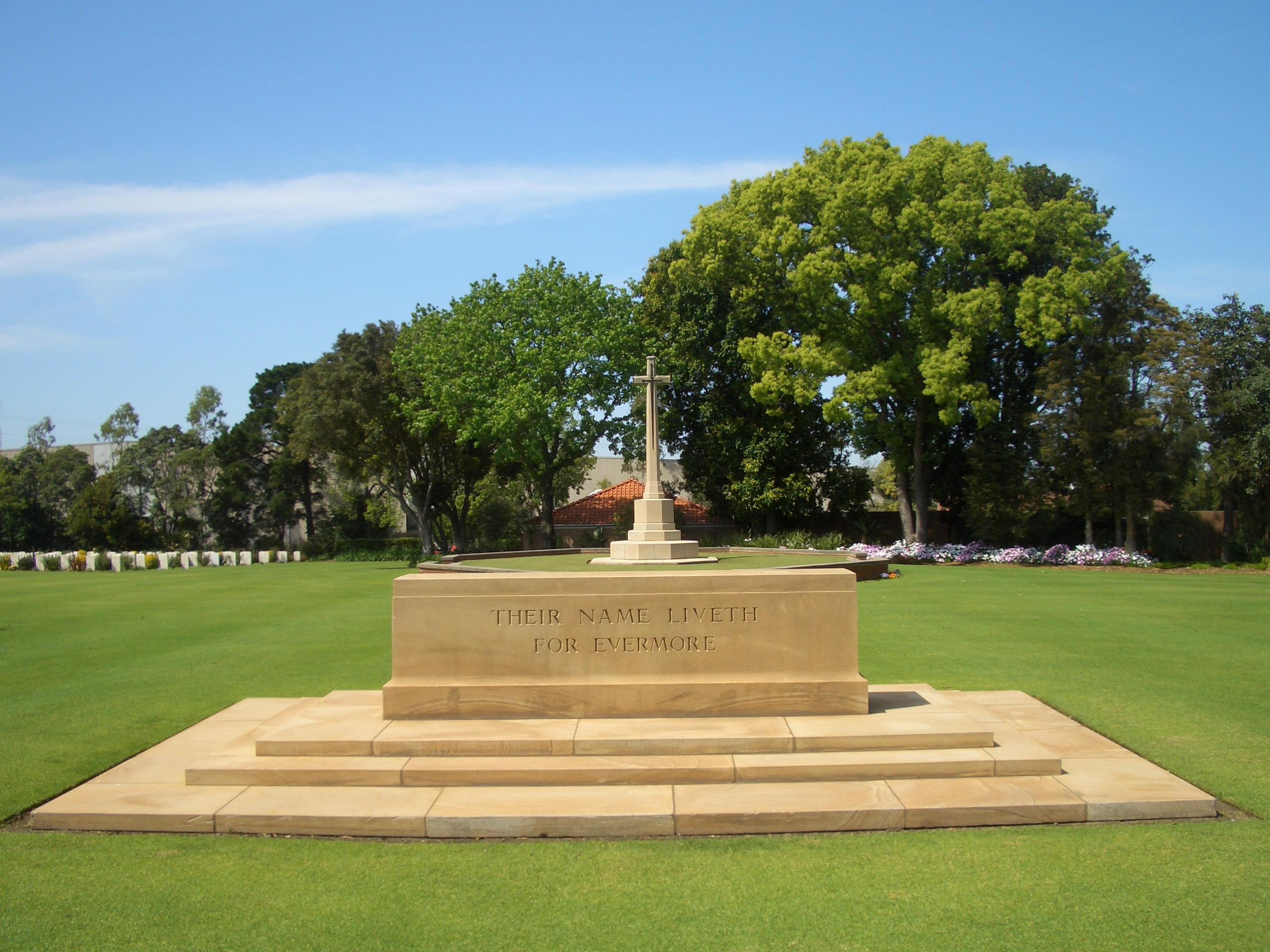
Rookwood Garden of Remembrance

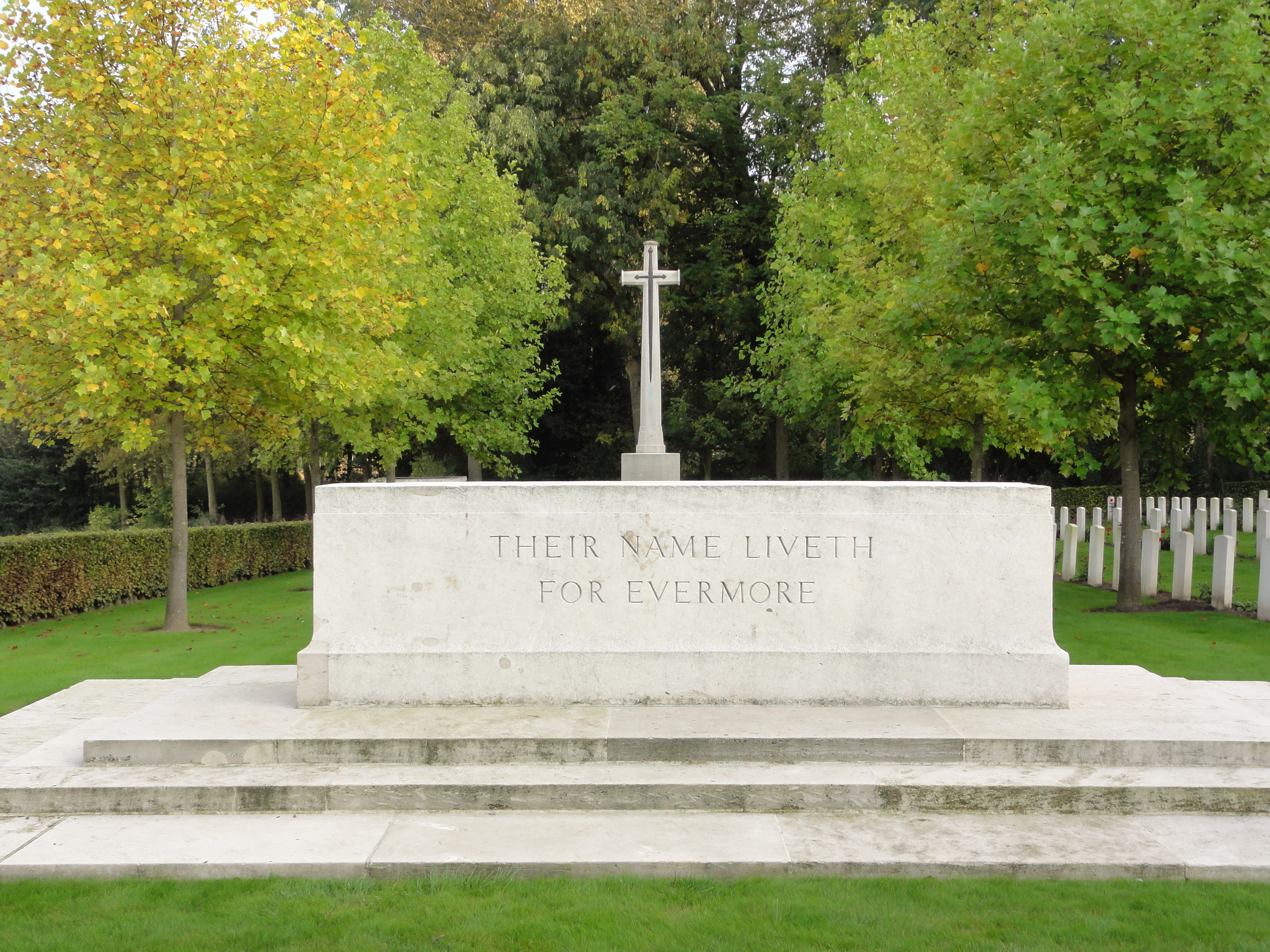
Kemmel Chateau Military Cemetery

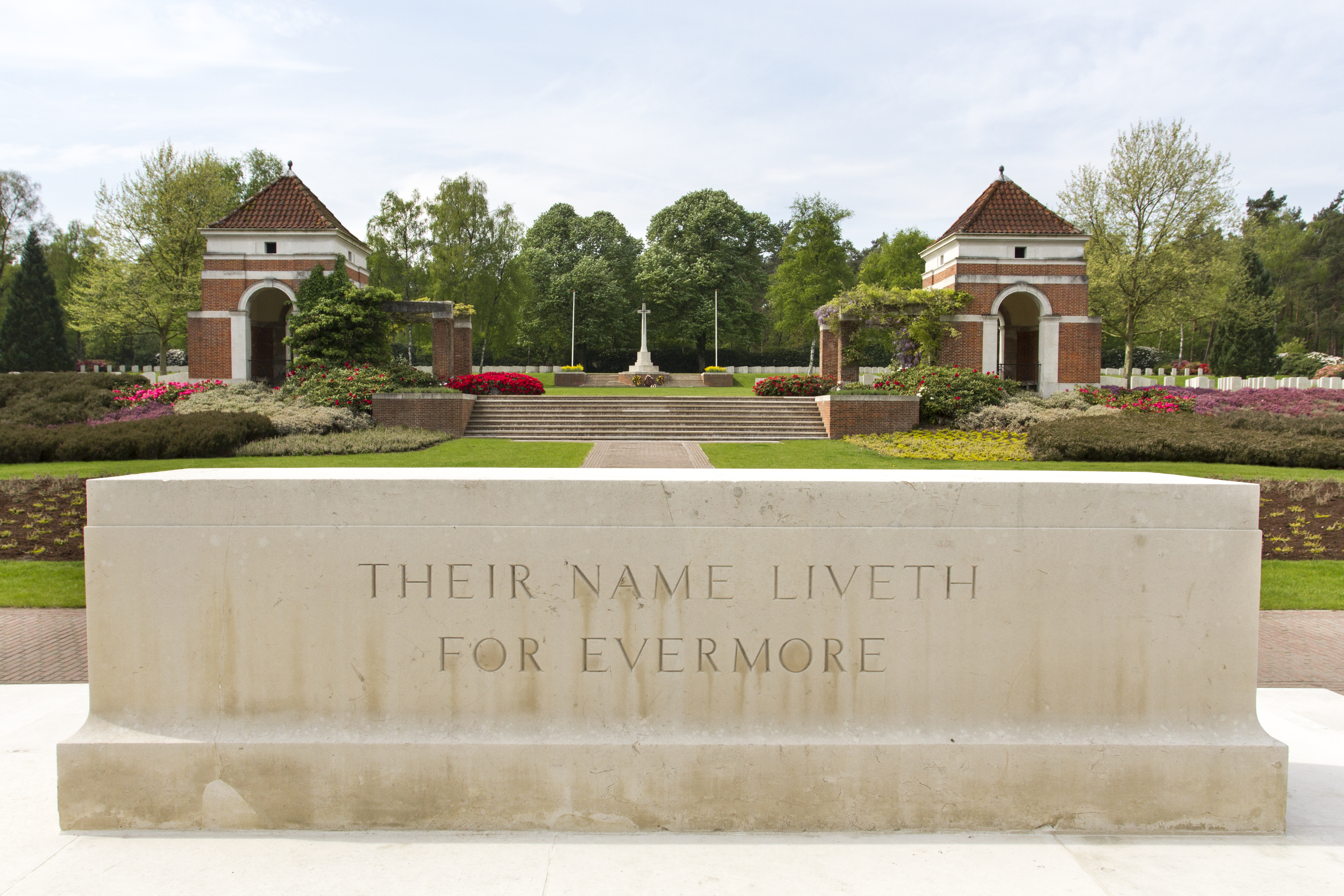
Holten Canadian War Cemetery

== See also ==
- World War I memorials
- Cross of Sacrifice
