= Sefid Zakhor gas field =

Gas field in Hormozgan Province, Iran

Sefid Zakhor
- Country: Iran
- Region: Hormozgan Province
- Offshore/onshore: onshore
- Operator: National Iranian Oil Company

Field history
- Discovery: 2007
- Start of production: 2007

Production
- Current production of gas: 33×10^{6} m^{3}/d 1.15×10^{9} cu ft/d 12×10^{9} m^{3}/a (420×10^{9} cu ft/a)
- Estimated gas in place: 326×10^{9} m^{3} 11.4×10^{12} cu ft

The Sefid Zakhor gas field is an Iranian natural gas field that was discovered in 2007. It began production in 2007 and produces natural gas and condensates. The total proven reserves of the Sefid Zakhor gas field are around 11.4 trillion cubic feet (326 billion m^{3}) and production is slated to be around 1.15 billion cubic feet/day (33 million m^{3}).
