= Lest we forget =

War remembrance phrase first used in a poem by Rudyard Kipling

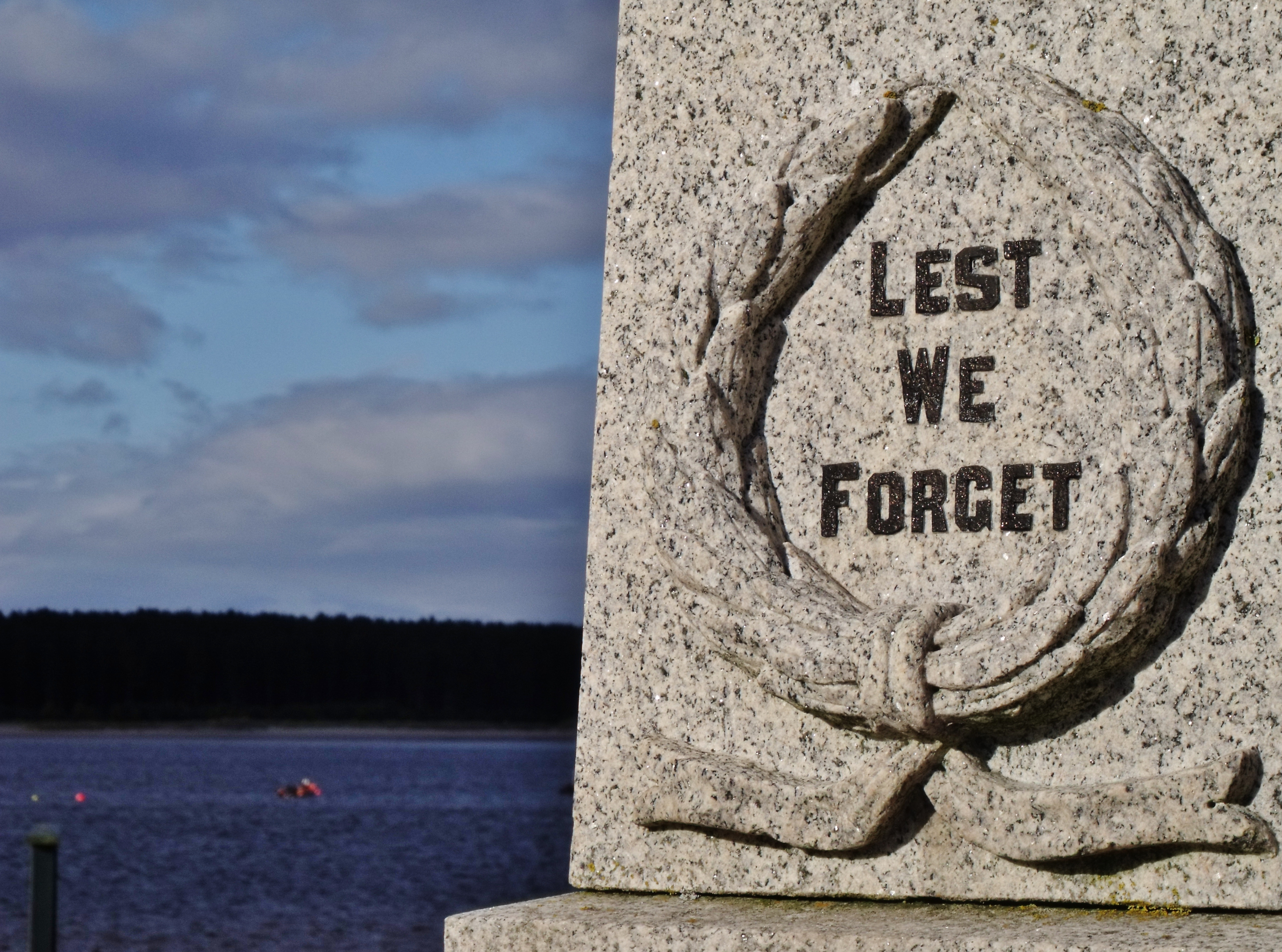
"Lest we forget" on a war memorial in Findhorn, Scotland

"Lest we forget" is a phrase commonly used in war-remembrance services and commemorative occasions in English-speaking countries, usually those connected to the British Empire, such as Britain, Canada, New Zealand and Australia.

== History ==
The originally biblical expression was first used in military context in an 1897 Christian poem by Rudyard Kipling, "Recessional", written to commemorate Queen Victoria's Diamond Jubilee.

The phrase occurs eight times; and is repeated at the end of the first four stanzas in order to add particular emphasis regarding the dangers of failing to remember.

God of our fathers, known of old,
Lord of our far-flung battle line,
Beneath whose awful hand we hold
Dominion over palm and pine—
Lord God of Hosts, be with us yet,
Lest we forget—lest we forget!

=== Bible ===
The concept of "being careful not to forget" was already present in the Bible (Deuteronomy 4:7–9):

^{7}For what nation is there so great, who hath God so nigh unto them, as the Lord our God is in all things that we call upon him for? ^{8}And what nation is there so great, that hath statutes and judgments so righteous as all this law, which I set before you this day?
^{9}Only take heed to thyself, and keep thy soul diligently, lest thou forget the things which thine eyes have seen, and lest they depart from thy heart all the days of thy life: but teach them thy sons, and thy son's sons ....

This Biblical quote is probably a direct source for the term in the 1897 poem. This is consistent with the main theme of the "Recessional" poem—that if a nation forgets the true source of its success (the "Lord God of Hosts" and His "ancient sacrifice" of "an humble and a contrite heart") – its military or material possessions will be insufficient in times of war.

The poem "Recessional" also appears as a common hymn at war-remembrance services; and the phrase "Lest We Forget" can hence be sung.

The phrase later passed into common usage after World War I across the British Commonwealth, especially becoming linked with Remembrance Day and Anzac Day observations; it became a plea not to forget past sacrifices, and was often found as the only wording on war memorials, or used as an epitaph.

== See also ==
- Historic recurrence
- Known unto God
- Their name liveth for evermore
- Je me souviens, lit. "I remember"
