= Torture in Brazil =

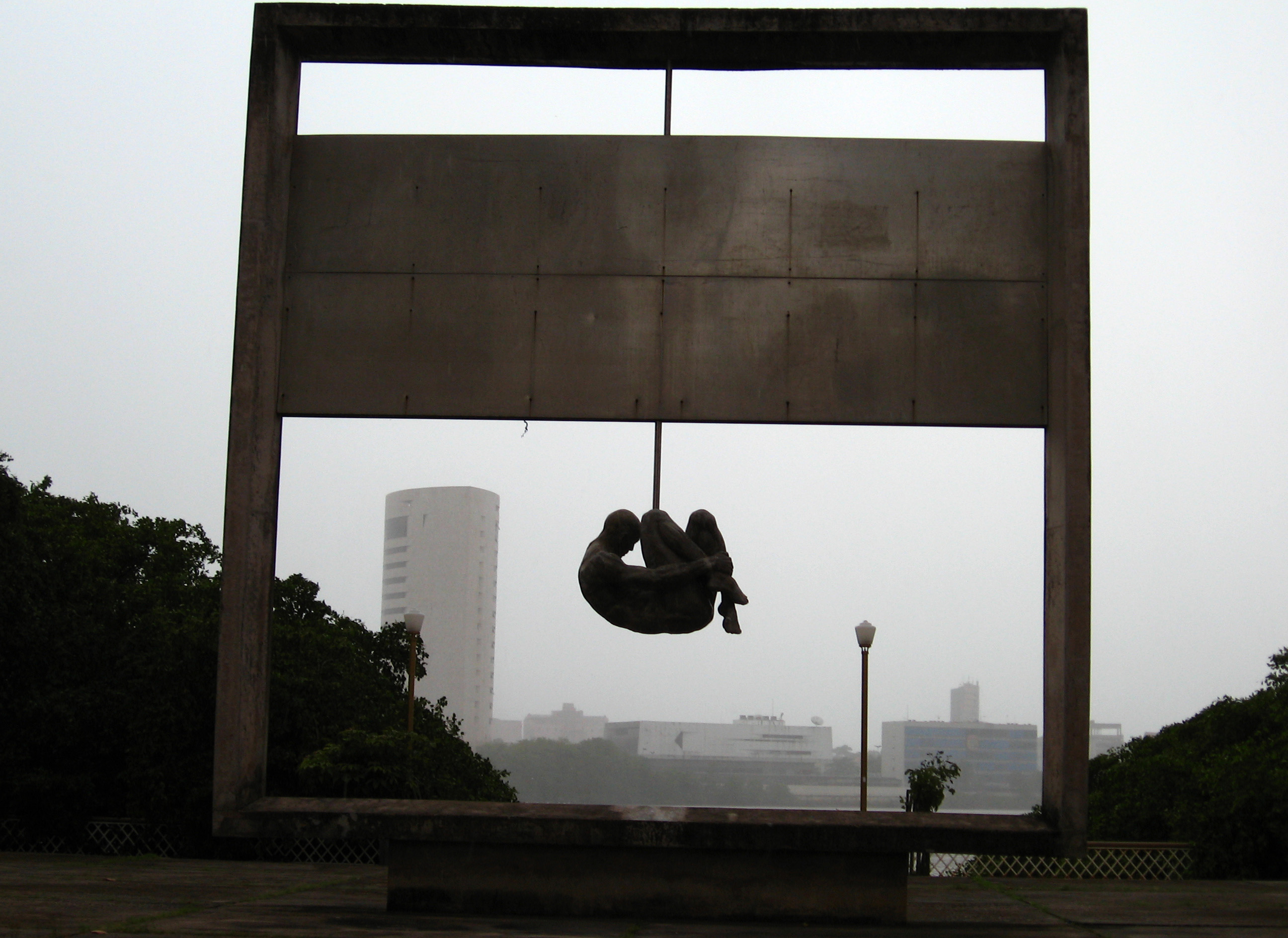
The Torture Never Again Monument, in Recife, was the first monument built in the country in honor of the dead and disappeared Brazilian politicians, and features the body of a naked man in the position of the pau de arara torture.

In Brazil, the use of torture – either as a means of obtaining evidence through confession or as a form of punishment for prisoners – dates back to colonial times. A legacy of the Inquisition, torture never ceased to be applied in Brazil during the 322 years of the colonial period, nor later, during the 67 years of the Empire and the republican period.

During the so-called years of lead, as well as during the Vargas dictatorship (the period called Estado Novo), there was the systematic practice of torture against political prisoners – those considered subversive and who allegedly threatened national security.

== During the military dictatorship (1964–1985) ==
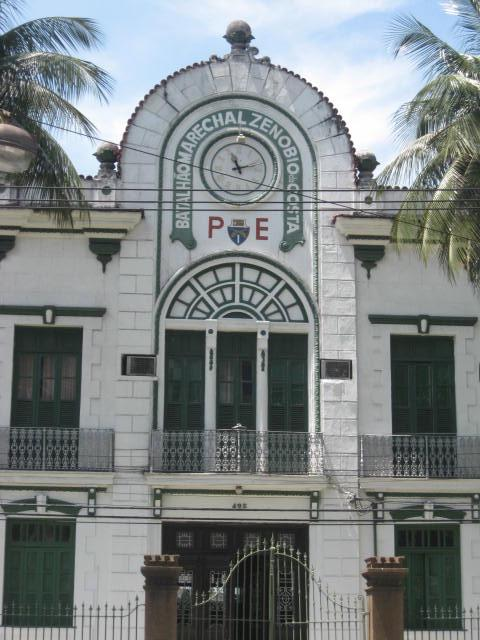
Quartel do 1º B.P.E. headquarters of the Rio de Janeiro DOI-CODI, used as a torture center during the military dictatorship.

During the military regime of 1964, the Brazilian torturers were mostly military personnel from the armed forces, especially the army. The main centers of torture in Brazil at this time were the Destacamentos de Operações de Informação – Centros de Operações de Defesa Interna (DOI/CODI), military organs of internal defense. In 2006, Carlos Alberto Brilhante Ustra, a colonel in the Brazilian Army and former head of the São Paulo DOI/CODI, answered for the crime of torture in a military court.

But there were also civilian torturers, who acted under orders from the military. One of the most famous and cruel torturers was Sérgio Paranhos Fleury, a delegate of the Department of Political and Social Order (DOPS) in São Paulo, who used brutal – and sometimes lethal – methods to obtain confessions from his suspects, in spite of his bosses. According the report from "Brasil: Nunca Mais", at least 1,918 political prisoners have testified to having been tortured between 1964 and 1979 (March 15, 1979 was the cut-off date for the period under investigation). The document describes 283 different forms of torture used at the time by the security agencies.

In the late 1960s and early 1970s, the military dictatorships in Brazil and other South American countries created the so-called Operation Condor to persecute, torture and eliminate opponents. They received support from North American military experts connected to the Central Intelligence Agency (CIA), who taught new torture techniques to obtain information. The School of the Americas, installed in the United States, was identified by historians and witnesses as a center for the dissemination of torture techniques. According to Cuban intelligence agent Manuel Cosculluela, American former police officer Dan Mitrione was one of the American envoys who, posing as an agent of the US Embassy in Brasilia, trained Brazilian police officers in "scientific" torture techniques to obtain information from arrested suspects; Cosculluela said he used beggars to demonstrate his techniques. Mitrione's story in Brazil was the subject of Costa-Gavras' film State of Siege.

With the re-democratization, in 1985, the practice of torture for political purposes ceased. But the techniques were incorporated by many police officers, who began to apply them against common prisoners, suspects or detainees, especially when they were black and poor, or, in rural areas, indigenous people. Among the main torture techniques applied in the period, we can mentionː the drowning, the Dragon Chair (a kind of electric chair), beatings, truth serum (injectable drug that leaves the victim in a state of drowsiness), the refrigerator (small box in which the victim was confined and suffered with extreme temperature fluctuations and disturbing noises) and pau de arara.

=== Training in torture techniques ===
The torture techniques used in Brazil, contrary to the idea that they would be improvisations of those who apply torture, actually have a close connection with techniques developed through experiments such as those of Project MKUltra. Techniques brought to Brazil and Latin America, through American training and trainers, are contained in the KUBARK Manuals used for training Brazilian military and security agents at the School of the Americas as well as in other exchange programs.

Several military and security agents from Brazil received training at the School of the Americas, whose name was changed to the Western Hemisphere Institute for Security Cooperation. Several members of the Brazilian police force were trained by torture experts who came to Brazil in order to spread the methods and means of interrogation compiled by the CIA.

Such was the case with the well-known Dan Mitrione. In the mid-1960s, Mitrione was hired by the United States Agency for International Development (USAID) to train the police in Brazil and Uruguay, teaching torture methods that spread further human rights violations and police brutality in Brazil and Uruguay. Some documents released by the US government about Mitrione's activities in South America are archived by The National Security Archive project.

The recent release by the US government of a partial list of names of participants in the School of the Americas training sessions has also revealed the fact that Brazilian military personnel have trained and participated in torture, including in Chile. The School of the Americas Watch organization, since 1983, has been researching information on countries sending personnel for training at the School of the Americas and publishing names of trainees, campaigning for the closure of the so-called "School of Assassins," now called the Western Hemisphere Institute for Security Cooperation.

== After the dictatorship ==
After the Brazilian military dictatorship, cases of torture are still commonly reported in Brazil. There were 466 reports of torture against the prison population registered with the National Secretariat for Human Rights in 2013. For her master's thesis, Maria Gorete Marques, a sociologist at the Center for the Study of Violence at the University of São Paulo (USP), followed 181 state agents who were being prosecuted for torture and concluded that 70% of them were not punished.

According to the sociologist, "The police officers deconstruct the accusation, saying that the victim already came with the injuries, transferring the authorship to third parties." The average number of complaints received by the National Council of Justice (CNJ) in 2013 was 36 complaints per month about torture and mistreatment of prisoners. At the Ministry of Justice, it was 130.

According to Judge Luciano Losekann of the Prison System Monitoring, "It generally occurs in closed environments, away from the eyes of witnesses or with the fearful complicity of public officials." Wilde Tayler, deputy director of the UN Subcommittee on Prevention of Torture, said that "There always seems to be an excuse for the bruises – there are a lot of people falling down the stairs. (...) Some things I saw in Brazil I didn't expect to see in the more severely underdeveloped countries." Juliano Breda, president of the OAB-PR said that the Public Ministry and the Judiciary are responsible for the cases of torture in Brazil, for not delving into the investigations.

According to a survey conducted in 2010 by Professor Nancy Cardia, from the Nucleus for the Study of Violence at USP, 52.5% of the population agreed that a court could accept evidence obtained through torture. In 1999, 71.2% of the population had the same reasoning.

"Torture in the (Sic)Country is cultural, widespread and systematic. It began in the period of slavery and is maintained until today (...) The Brazilian vocation for torture has solidified because torturers are not punished."

— Margarida Pressburger, member of the United Nations (UN) Subcommittee, 2016

According to José de Jesus Filho, legal advisor to the National Prison Pastoral, "Who investigates is the police or prison staff. Many times, it is the torturer who takes the victim for the corpus delicti exam, and the doctors who make the reports omit themselves." The deputy Marcelo Freixo (PSOL) created the law of the Committee for the Prevention of Torture in the State. The purpose is to monitor prisons, police stations, insane asylums and social-educational units.

== Brazilian Legislation ==
According to Law 9 455, April 7, 1997, constitutes, the crime of torture:

"To force someone with violence or serious threat, causing physical or mental suffering;" "To subject someone under your care, power or authority, using violence or serious threat, to intense physical or mental suffering, as a means of applying personal punishment or preventive measure".

The consequences in relation to the public office, function or employment are causes for increasing the penalty. The crime is punishable by imprisonment and cannot be subject to grace or amnesty, and the penalty must be served in a closed regime, except in the case of article 1 § 2, which imposes a lower penalty on the one who omits in the face of torture of a third party.

== See also ==
- Torture Never Again
- Human rights in Brazil
- Crime in Brazil
- Social issues in Brazil
- Racism in Brazil
- Homophobia in Brazil
- Fazenda 31 de Março
- Casa da Morte
- Assassination of Genivaldo de Jesus
