= Human rights abuses of the military dictatorship in Brazil =

The systemic human rights abuses of the military dictatorship in Brazil from 1964 to 1985 included extrajudicial killings, forced disappearances, torture, arbitrary detention, and severe restrictions on freedom of speech. Human Rights Watch has described the human rights abuses of the military dictatorship in Brazil as crimes against humanity.

The Brazilian government's Institutional Act 5 of 13 December 1968, which suspended habeas corpus and constitutional protections and led to the institutionalization of torture as a tool by the state, brought on a period of state violence and repression. As James Petras argued, the military dictatorship's institutionalization of violence and systemic use of terror were fundamental to its short-lived "economic miracle".

== Extrajudicial killings and forced disappearances ==
Brazil's National Truth Commission, a restorative justice body convened to study human rights abuses in Brazil, recognized 434 political killings and forced disappearances between 1946 and 1988, the majority of which occurred during the military dictatorship's rule from 1964 to 1985.

== Torture ==
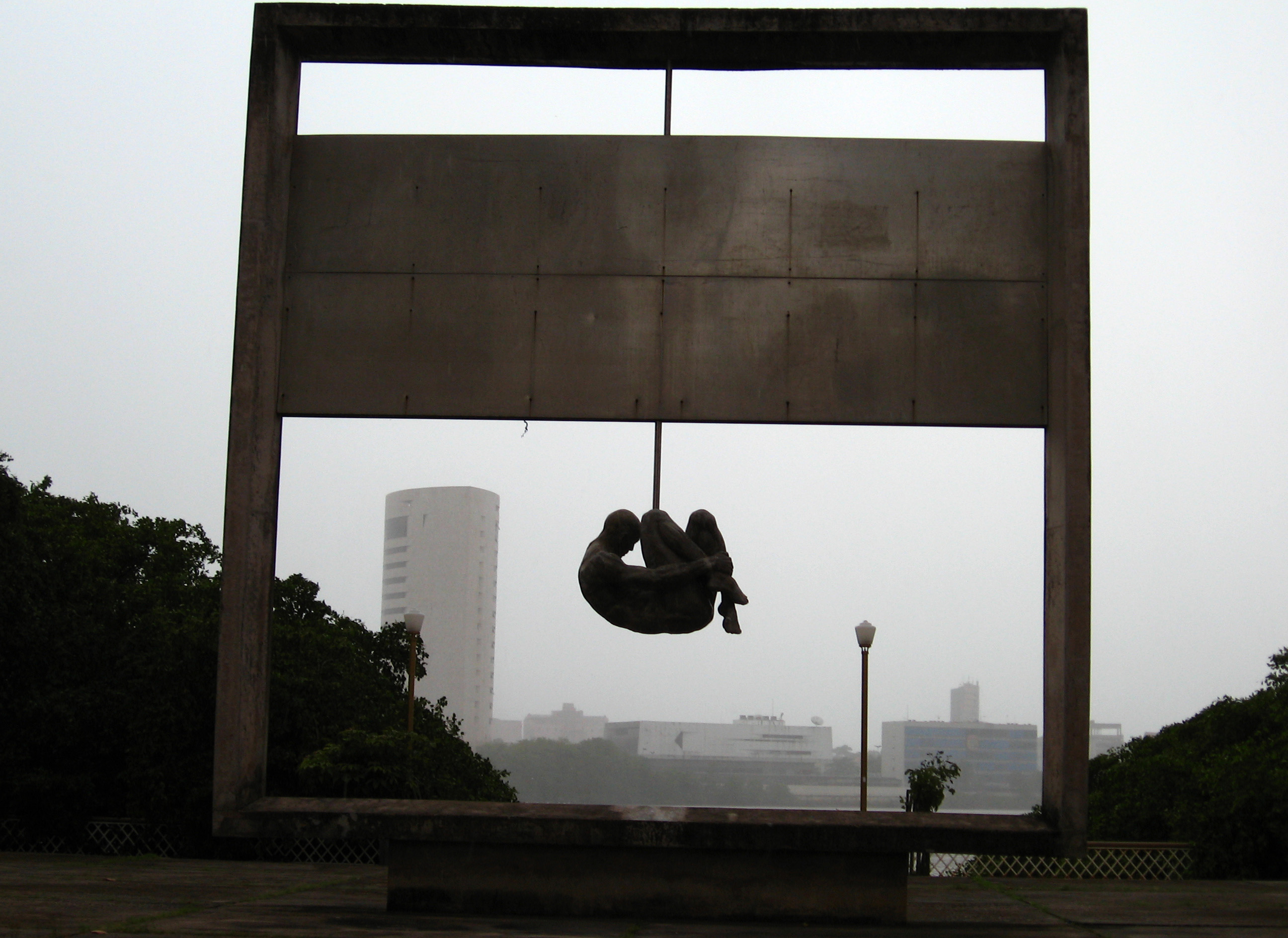
The pau de arara torture method represented in the Tortura Nunca Mais monument.

Brasil: Nunca Mais is a monumental report edited by Paulo Evaristo Arns; it was published 15 July 1985, four months after the restoration of civilian rule. It documented the extent and character of the military dictatorship's use of torture by analyzing hundreds of thousands of court testimonies and official documents.

== Arbitrary detention ==
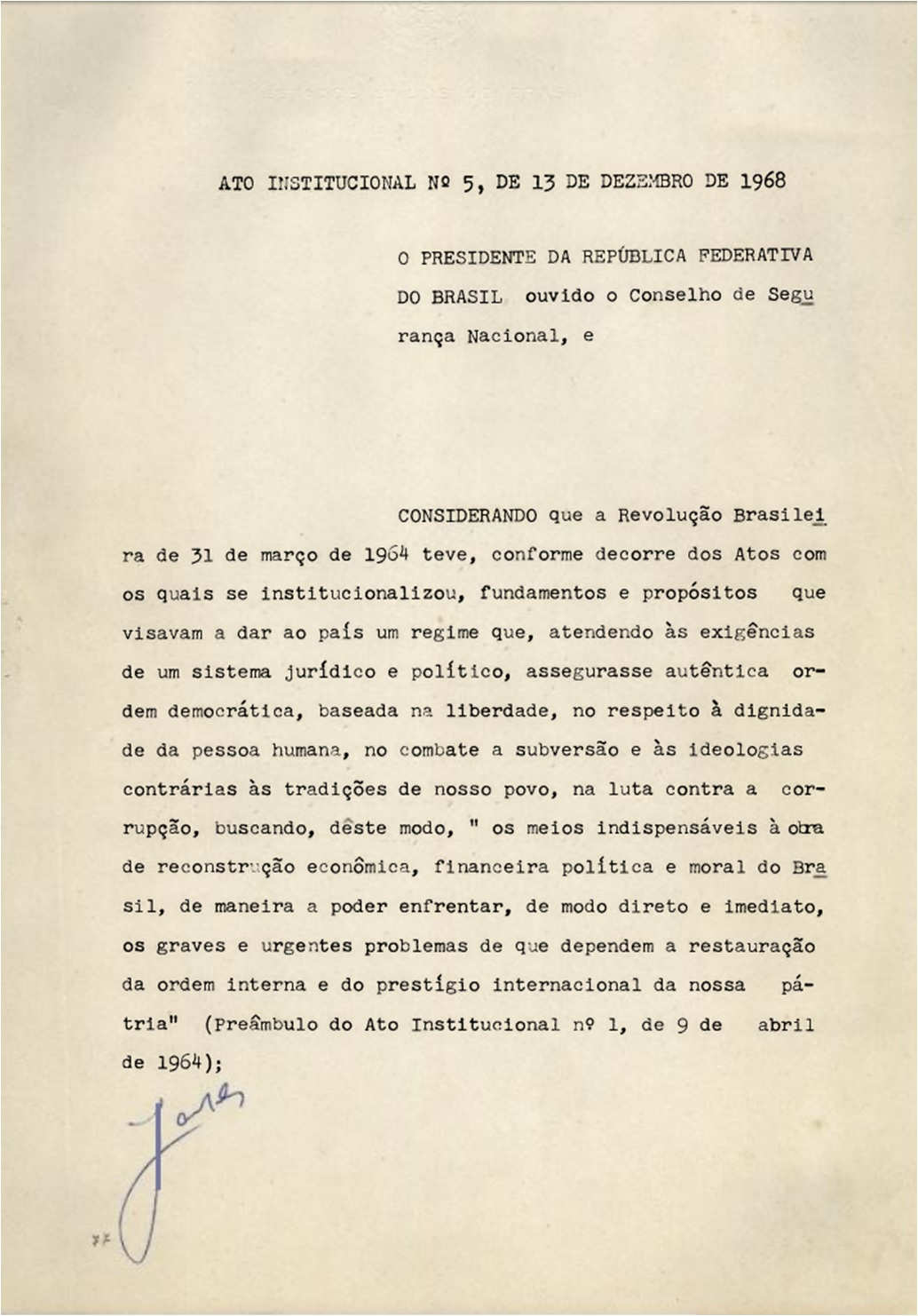
Institutional Act Number Five suspended habeas corpus and constitutional protections, allowing for arbitrary detention.

Official estimates indicate that around 50,000 people were detained in the initial months of the dictatorship, with approximately 10,000 individuals forced into exile during that period. An example of arbitrary detention under the military dictatorship was the detainment, torture, and forced disappearance of 70 members of the Communist Party of Brazil and peasants without investigation and the subsequent restriction of access to information for next of kin; this violated Article 13 of the American Convention on Human Rights.

== Censorship ==
Zuenir Ventura estimates that in the period from 13 December 1968 to 1 January 1979 during which the AI-5 was in effect, "approximately 500 films, 450 theatrical plays, 200 books, dozens of radio programs, 100 magazines, over 500 song lyrics, and a dozen telenovela titles and pilots" were censored.

== Mass grave ==
The military dictatorship used Cemitério Dom Bosco as a clandestine mass grave to bury the bodies of disappeared dissidents. In September 1990, an investigation supported by Luiza Erundina discovered a clandestine ditch with 1,049 body bags containing skeletal remains, only five of which have been identified, including those of the trade unionist Aluísio Palhano Pedreira Ferreira.

== Legacy ==
The Inter-American Commission on Human Rights issued a ruling in 2009 which marked the first international judgement on crimes against humanity during Brazil's military rule; it specifically emphasized the need for accountability and justice for victims and their families. Before then, no Brazilian official had yet been charged for the human rights abuses committed during the military dictatorship.

=== Attempts at reconciliation ===
In 2014, the National Truth Commission identified 377 state agents—about 200 of whom were still alive—who had been responsible for hundreds of cases of torture, assassinations, and secret disappearances during the military dictatorship. However, the amnesty law passed by the dictatorship 28 August 1979 legally shielded all those guilty of torture.

In June 2021, a Brazilian court handed down the first conviction of a state agent for human rights abuses: retired police officer Carlos Alberto Agusto was sentenced to 2 years and 11 months in prison for kidnapping Edgar de Aquino Duarte. Judge Silvio Cesar Arouck Gemaque concluded that kidnapping was an "ongoing crime" to which the amnesty law wouldn't apply.

== See also ==
- Figueiredo Report
