= Torture Never Again =

Brazilian human rights organization

- Tortura Nunca Mais
- Purpose: Human rights
- Headquarters: Brazil
- Website: www.torturanuncamais-rj.org.br

Torture Never Again (Tortura Nunca Mais) is a Brazilian human rights organization, founded by Cecília Coimbra, a victim of Brazilian military torturers.

== Introduction ==
"Brazil: Never Again" was a research project published in its original version, Brasil: Nunca Mais (BNM) in Portuguese in 1985 and was republished in an English-language copy entitled Torture in Brazil. The project, whose authors reserved their anonymity as a safety precaution, collected and analyzed documents for more than 707 Brazilian military court proceedings spanning the time frame from 1964 to 1979. These documents detail and expose the atrocious tortures that took place under Brazil's repressive military system of government. The goal of the BNM project was to supply concrete proof of Brazil's political oppression by delivering official legal proceedings drafted and approved by the very organization accused of such oppression. By providing such irrefutable proof, the members of the project hoped to negate any claim that the victims of torture were politically motivated or biased in their accounts of the abuse suffered at the hands of military and police personnel.

== Background ==
The coup that displaced Brazil's president amidst a backdrop of political and economic instability took place on April 1, 1964. A faction of Brazil's military unseated President João Goulart and assumed power under the Institutional Act of 9 April 1964. This act legitimized the military junta as the dominant authority in Brazil. Within days of taking control of the Brazilian government in 1964, the military regime began categorizing society in two ways: civilians and subversive enemies. Almost immediately, Operation Cleanup (Operação Limpeza) was created, and the government began kidnapping, imprisoning, and torturing thousands of suspected subversives.

== Standard torture procedures ==
Under the Brazilian military regime from 1964 to 1985, torture was not only condoned, but also institutionalized. Methods and procedures for torture became such an integral part of the military government's oppressive tactics that the military integrated classes on torture into their training program. Some of the defendants from the court documents were forced to participate in the practical application portion of the class; these individuals were tortured in front of the classroom of students as a pedagogical approach. The following list provides some of the methods the interrogators used while torturing the defendants:

- The parrot's perch (pau de arara)
- Electric shocks
- Drowning
- The dragon's chair
- The ice box
- Insects and animals (such as snakes, alligators, cockroaches)
- Chemical products
- Physical injury

The motive behind the use of torture was not to cause physical pain as punishment but rather to physically, emotionally, and morally break down the victim. Once the individual has become so extremely weakened in these multiple facets, the government's hope was that this individual would be unable to uphold any prior familial or political loyalties and instead confess. Because the government wanted information as quickly as possible, it was not unusual to torture women or torture or threaten children who were related to the suspect in order to break down the suspect's mental and emotional composure.

== Victims ==
Of the more than 707 court reports that BNM categorized, analyzed and documented, they provided data indexing 695 cases. In those cases, 88% of the 7,367 defendants were male and the majority were members of the middle class. BNM classified many of the torture defendants into the following afflicted groups:

1. Political organizations: Brazilian Communist Party (PCB), Armed Dissidents, Communist Party of Brazil (PC DO B), Popular Action (Acão Popular; AP), Marxist Revolutionary Organization-Workers' Politics (POLOP), Trotskyite Groups, and Revolutionary Nationalism Groups.
2. Social groups: Military personnel, union leaders, students, political figures, journalists, and religious workers.
3. Any individuals guilty of the following three activities could be subject to torture: activities in support of the former President Goulart's government, subversive propaganda and criticism of authorities.

== Lasting effects ==
Brazil's president Dilma Rousseff was a former guerrilla who was part of the Palmares Armed Revolutionary Vanguard in the 1970s. She revealed in testimonies in 2001 and 2005 details of the torture she was subjected to by military officials. Rousseff recounts having been stripped naked and suspended upside down, with bound wrists and ankles. While in this position, she was "submitted to electric shocks on different parts of her body, including her breasts, inner thighs and head" and was beaten in the face. Retired military officials accused of torturing Rousseff have questioned evidence and accused Rousseff of belonging to an armed militant group that sought to install a Soviet-inspired dictatorship. Rousseff vowed to donate her reparation check of about $10,000 to Torture Never Again in May 2012. Chile's former president Michelle Bachelet is a survivor of detention and torture after a 1973 military coup. Uruguay's president José Mujica is a former leader of the Tupamaro guerrilla organization who was tortured during nearly a decade and a half of imprisonment. World-renowned architect Oscar Niemeyer agreed to design a monument condemning torture for Rio de Janeiro in 1985. The project was proposed by the activist group Grupo Tortura Nunca Mais, founded during the first months of civilian government following twenty-one years of military dictatorship in Brazil. The group's members were torture victims and family members of victims. However, this monument has not been built.

A key aim of the project was to expose aspects of the history of dictatorship. They also hoped the monument would help to console victims and their families and inspire and inform conversation about the recent history of Brazil. Grupo Tortura Nunca Mais won municipal approval for two other major projects. The first was supposed to rename streets and plazas in homage to those who had disappeared or been assassinated, and the second, to convert the former police headquarters in Rio into a cultural center and state archive.

In 1993, the city of Recife, Brazil, inaugurated a monument recognizing the victims of torture during the military dictatorship, known as the Torture Never Again Monument. In 1988, the city held a competition for the design, and over 20 artists entered. Demetrio Albuquerque, a Brazilian architect and sculptor, led the winning team. The monument depicts a man in the "pau de arara", or parrot's perch, torture position, in which victims are hung upside down with their wrists and ankles bound. This is a practice that former Brazilian President Dilma Rousseff endured.

== Amnesty Act ==
In 1979, the Brazilian Congress met to consider the proposal for amnesty from the government of João Figueiredo. The House was highly biased towards the military, with soldiers occupying nearly 800 of the 1200 seats. The people protested to change the amnesty agreement, since it consisted of amnesty only for the violent military crimes. The treaty only served to restore the political rights of those who opposed the dictatorship, but offered no compensation to the victims or their families. Given that in certain cases of torture, such as Frei Tito's, were so brutal that they ended in the suicide of the victim, the people expected some form of compensation. When the bill for the Amnesty Project was to be passed, the Brazilian Democratic Movement (MDB), the political party opposing the dictatorship, boycotted the ceremony, protesting that the settlement was in no way favorable to the victims or the opponents of the dictatorship. In addition, the law served as a shield to those who had violated human rights and protected them from prosecution; these perpetrators have yet to face criminal justice.
