= Pau de arara =

Torture method

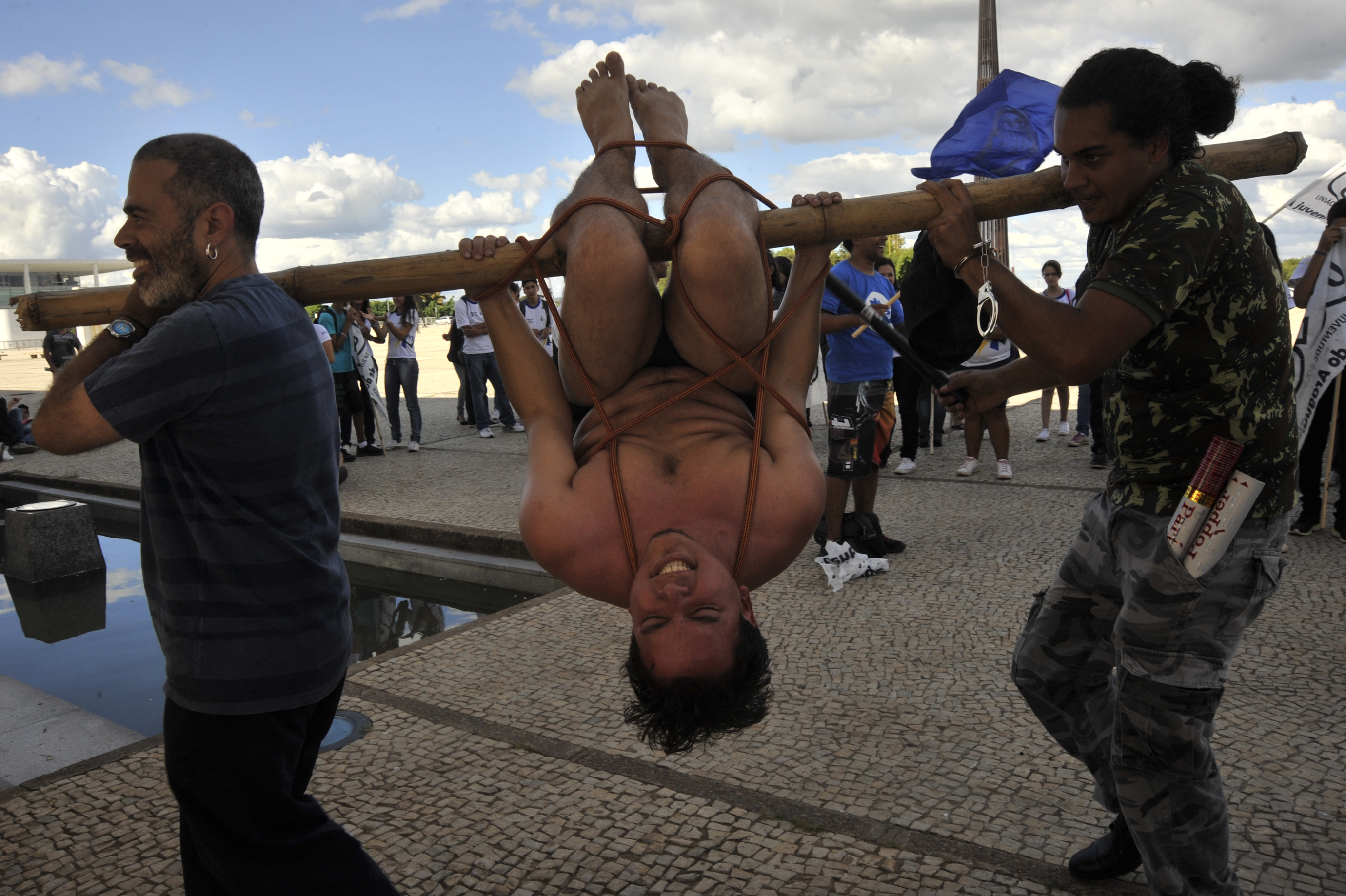
Students protesting a Pau de Arara in Brasília in 2012.

Pau de arara (Portuguese pronunciation: [ˈpaw dʒi aˈɾaɾɐ]) is a torture method in which the victim is bound by the ankles and wrists, with the biceps under a pole and knees over it. The pau de arara torture method was widely used during the military dictatorship in Brazil.

== Name ==
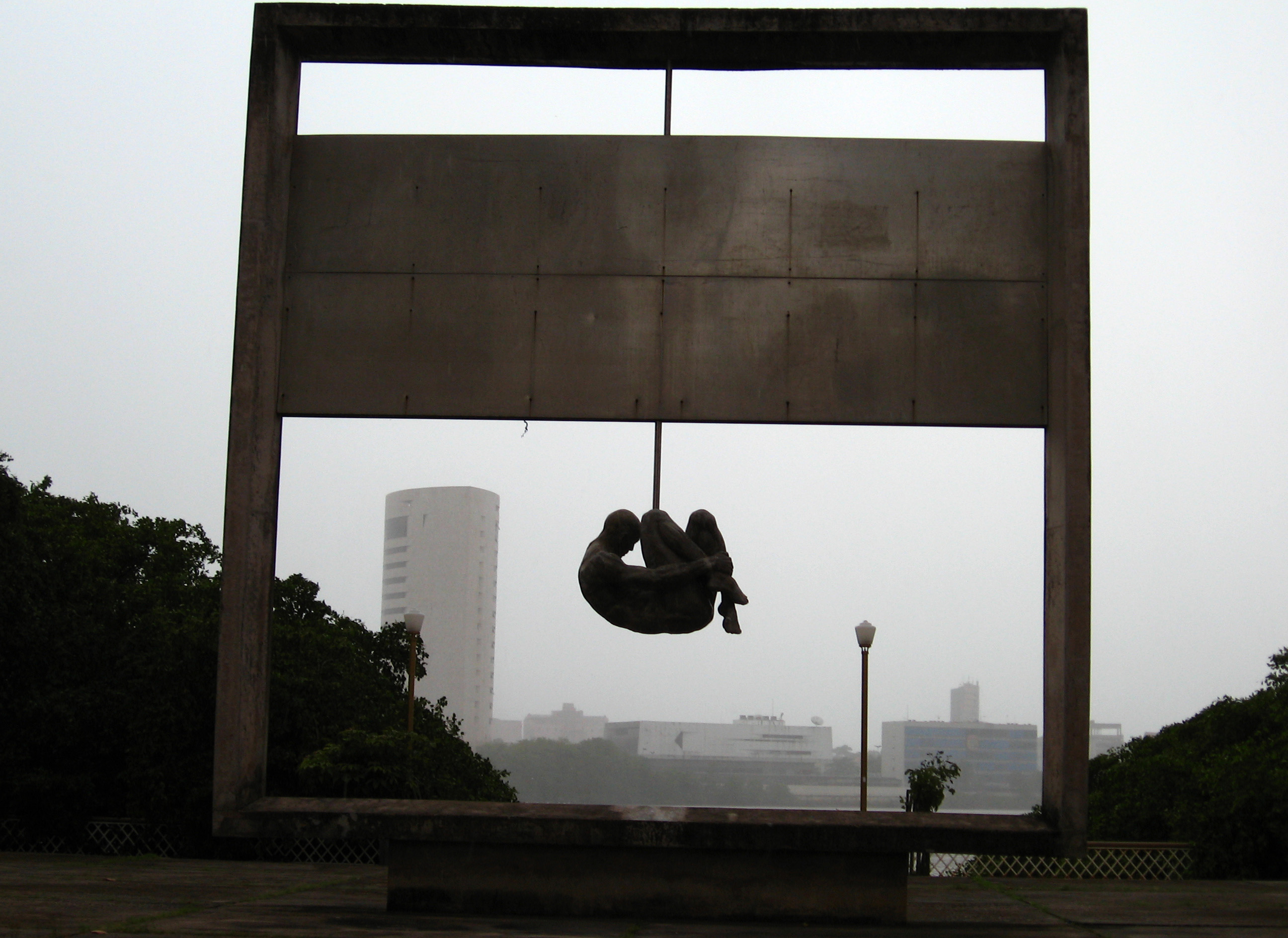
Example of pau de arara at the Tortura Nunca Mais monument

Pau de arara is a Portuguese term that literally translates to "macaw's perch". The term originates from bird sellers' practice of tying the birds to a perch, where they also hang for transportation.

== Torture technique ==
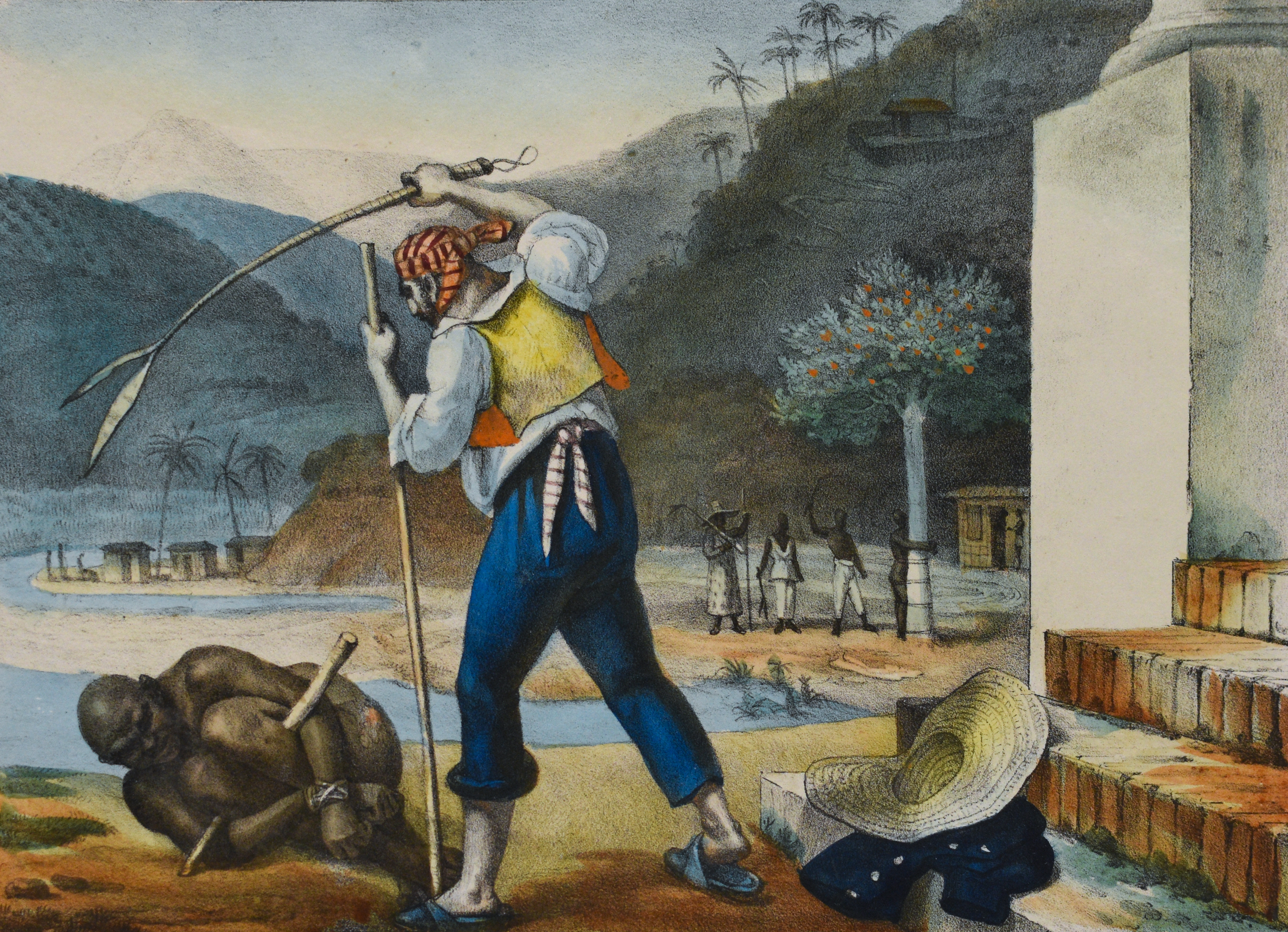
Jean-Baptiste Debret's painting Slavery in Brazil, depicting an enslaved African tied up in a pau de arara

Pau de arara is a physical torture technique designed to cause severe joint and muscle pain, as well as headaches and psychological trauma. The technique consists of a bar placed between the victim's biceps and the backs of their knees while their ankles and wrists are tied together. The bar is then suspended between two metal platforms forming what looks like a bird's perch. This arrangement suspends them in such a way as to place their whole weight on the backs of their calves at a considerable mechanical disadvantage, severely straining their muscles, tendons and knees. They can shift some of their weight to the tops of their forearms temporarily to relieve the strain on their legs, but this position is also painful for the same reasons, and since arms are weaker than legs, respite is only momentary. By alternating between the positions to attempt to reduce their pain, eventually both their arm and leg muscles tire, leaving them in pain that they are unable to relieve.

This technique is believed to originate from Portuguese slave traders, which used pau de arara as a form of punishment for disobedient slaves. Its use has been more recently widespread by the agents of the political police of the Brazilian military dictatorship against political dissidents in the 1960s and 1970s and is still believed to be in use by Brazilian police forces, although outlawed.

Brazil's former president Jair Bolsonaro has cited his support for the technique, saying "the pau-de-arara works. I'm in favor of torture, you know that. And the people are in favor as well."

== Pau de arara: la violence militaire au Brésil ==
François Maspero published Pau de arara: la violence militaire au Brésil in France in 1971. The book, which discussed military violence in Brazil, was banned in Brazil during the military dictatorship. It was first published in Brazil in 2013.
