= Monument Tortura Nunca Mais =

Monument in Padre Henrique plaza in Recife, Pernambuco, Brazil

Coordinates: 8°03′23″S 34°52′40″W

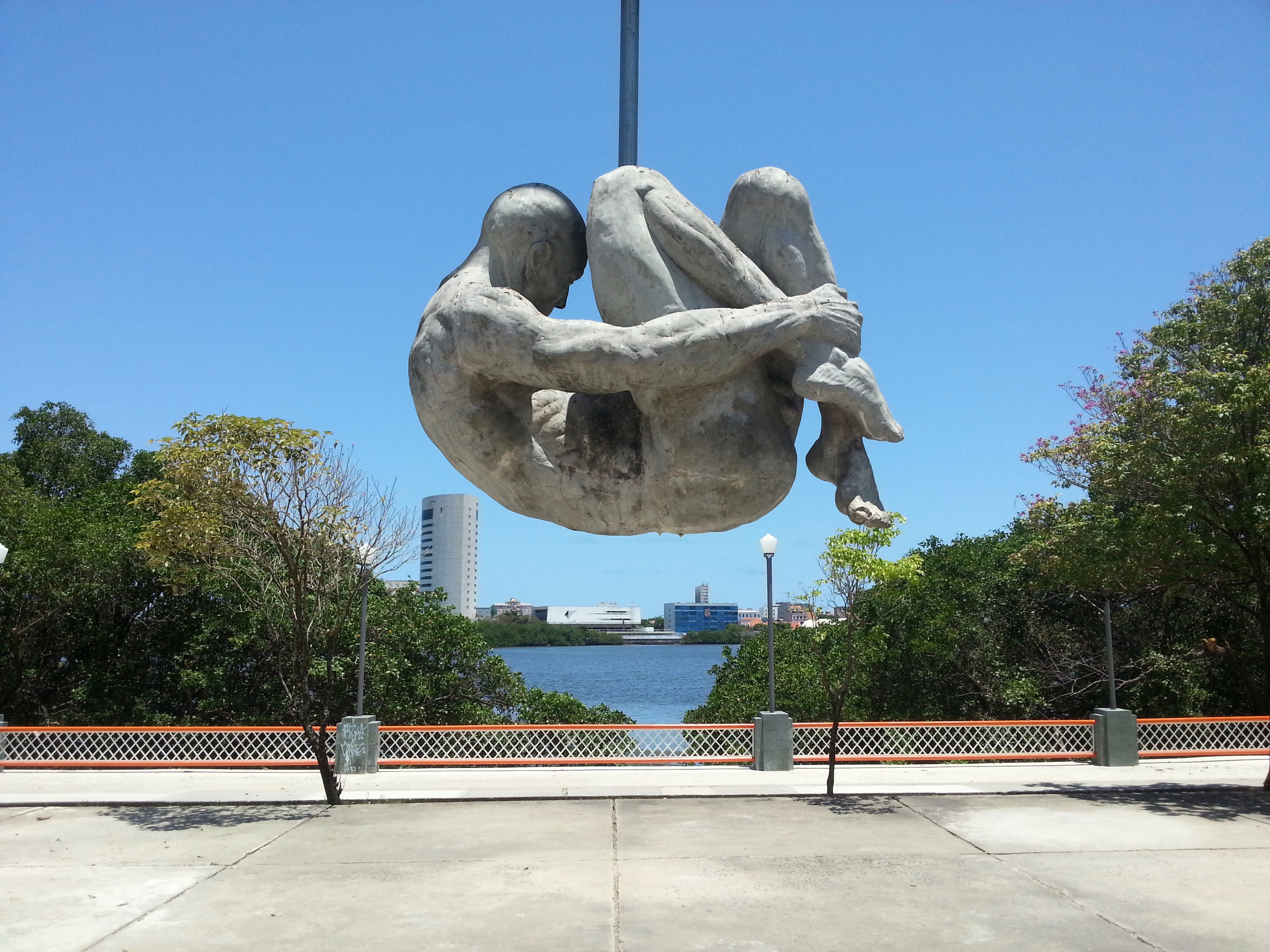
The Monument Tortura Nunca Mais (Torture Never Again Monument), in Recife, was the first monument built in honor of the dead and disappeared during the Brazilian military dictatorship. It presents a male naked body in a torture position at a pau de arara.

The Monument Tortura Nunca Mais is a monument located in Padre Henrique plaza in Recife, Pernambuco, Brazil. It was conceived by the architect Demétrio Albuquerque. It was the first monument built in honor of the dead and disappeared during the military dictatorship.

Its construction was the result of a public tendering made by Recife's city hall in 1988, which envisaged not only the construction of a monument which could represent the torture conditions and disrespect to human dignity to which the population was subjected during the Brazilian military government but also the revitalization of Recife since.

It was inaugurated on August 27, 1993, and it is, since then, considered to be one of the tourist attractions of Recife.

== See also ==
- Tortura Nunca Mais
