= Military dictatorship in Brazil =

1964–1985 military regime in Brazil

Republic of the United States of Brazil (1964–1967) República dos Estados Unidos do Brasil Federative Republic of Brazil (1967–1985) República Federativa do Brasil
- 1964–1985
- Flag (1968–1985) Coat of arms (1971–1985)
- Motto: "Ordem e Progresso" "Order and Progress"
- Anthem: Hino Nacional Brasileiro (English: "Brazilian National Anthem")
- Status: Military dictatorship
- Capital: Brasília
- Common languages: Portuguese
- Religion (1970): 92% Catholic; 5% Protestant; 2% Other; 1% Irreligious
- Government: Federal presidential republic under an authoritarian military dictatorship (Note: Only two-parties were legal from 1965–1979, ARENA and MDB. A multi-party system was later implemented from 1979 onwards.)
- President
  - 1964: Ranieri Mazzilli
  - 1964–1967: Humberto de Alencar Castelo Branco
  - 1967–1969: Artur da Costa e Silva
  - 1969: Military junta
  - 1969–1974: Emílio Garrastazu Médici
  - 1974–1979: Ernesto Geisel
  - 1979–1985: João Figueiredo
- Vice President
  - 1964–1967: José Maria Alkmin
  - 1967–1969: Pedro Aleixo
  - 1969–1974: Augusto Rademaker
  - 1974–1979: Adalberto Pereira
  - 1979–1985: Aureliano Chaves
- Legislature: National Congress
  - Upper house: Federal Senate
  - Lower house: Chamber of Deputies
- Historical era: Cold War
  - Military coup d'état: 1 April 1964
  - New constitution: 24 January 1967
  - Institutional Act No. 5: 13 December 1968
  - Brazilian Miracle: 1968–1973
  - Liberalization: 1974–1988
  - Democracy restored: 15 March 1985

Population
  - 1970: 94,508,583
  - 1980: 121,150,573
- HDI (1980): 0.545 low
- Currency: Cruzeiro
- ISO 3166 code: BR
Preceded by	Succeeded by
Fourth Brazilian Republic	Sixth Brazilian Republic

The military dictatorship in Brazil (Portuguese: ditadura militar [dʒitaˈduɾɐ miliˈtaʁ]), sometimes called the Fifth Brazilian Republic, was established on 1 April 1964, after a coup d'état by the Brazilian Armed Forces with support from the United States government against President João Goulart. It lasted 21 years, until 15 March 1985.

The military coup of 1964 was planned and executed by the seniormost commanders of the Brazilian Army and was supported by almost all high-ranking members of the military, along with conservative sectors in society, like the Catholic Church and anti-communist civilian movements among the middle and upper classes. The coup was supported by José de Magalhães Pinto, Adhemar de Barros, and Carlos Lacerda (who had already participated in the conspiracy to depose Getúlio Vargas in 1945), then governors of the states of Minas Gerais, São Paulo, and Guanabara, respectively. The U.S. State Department supported the coup through Operation Brother Sam and thereafter supported the regime through its embassy in Brasília. The military regime, particularly after the Institutional Act No. 5 of 1968, practiced extensive censorship and committed human rights abuses. Those abuses included institutionalized torture, extrajudicial killings, and forced disappearances. Despite initial pledges to the contrary, the regime enacted a new, restrictive Constitution in 1967, and stifled freedom of speech and political opposition. Its guidelines were nationalism, economic development, and anti-communism.

The dictatorship reached the height of its popularity in the early 1970s with the so-called "Brazilian Miracle", even as it censored all media, and tortured, killed, and exiled dissidents. João Figueiredo became president in March 1979; the same year, he passed the Amnesty Law for political crimes committed for and against the regime. While combating "hardliners" inside the government and supporting a redemocratization policy, Figueiredo could not control the crumbling economy, chronic inflation, and concurrent fall of other South American military dictatorships. Amid massive popular demonstrations on the streets of Brazil's biggest cities, the first free elections in 20 years were held for the national legislature in 1982. In 1985, another election was held, this time to indirectly elect a new president, being contested between civilian candidates for the first time since the 1960s and won by the opposition. In 1988, a new Constitution passed and Brazil officially returned to democracy.

Brazil's military government provided a model for other military regimes and dictatorships throughout Latin America, being systematized by the so-called "National Security Doctrine", which was used to justify the military's actions as in the interest of national security in a time of crisis, a rationale upon which other military regimes relied. In 2014, nearly 30 years after the regime collapsed, the Brazilian military recognized for the first time the excesses its agents committed during the dictatorship, including the torture and murder of political dissidents. In 2018, the U.S. government released a 1974 memorandum written for Henry Kissinger when he was Secretary of State confirming that the Brazilian leadership was fully aware of the killing of dissidents. It is estimated that 434 people were either confirmed killed or went missing and 20,000 people were tortured during Brazil's military dictatorship. Some human rights activists and others assert that the figure could be much higher, and should include thousands of indigenous people who died because of the regime's negligence, but the armed forces dispute this.

== Background ==
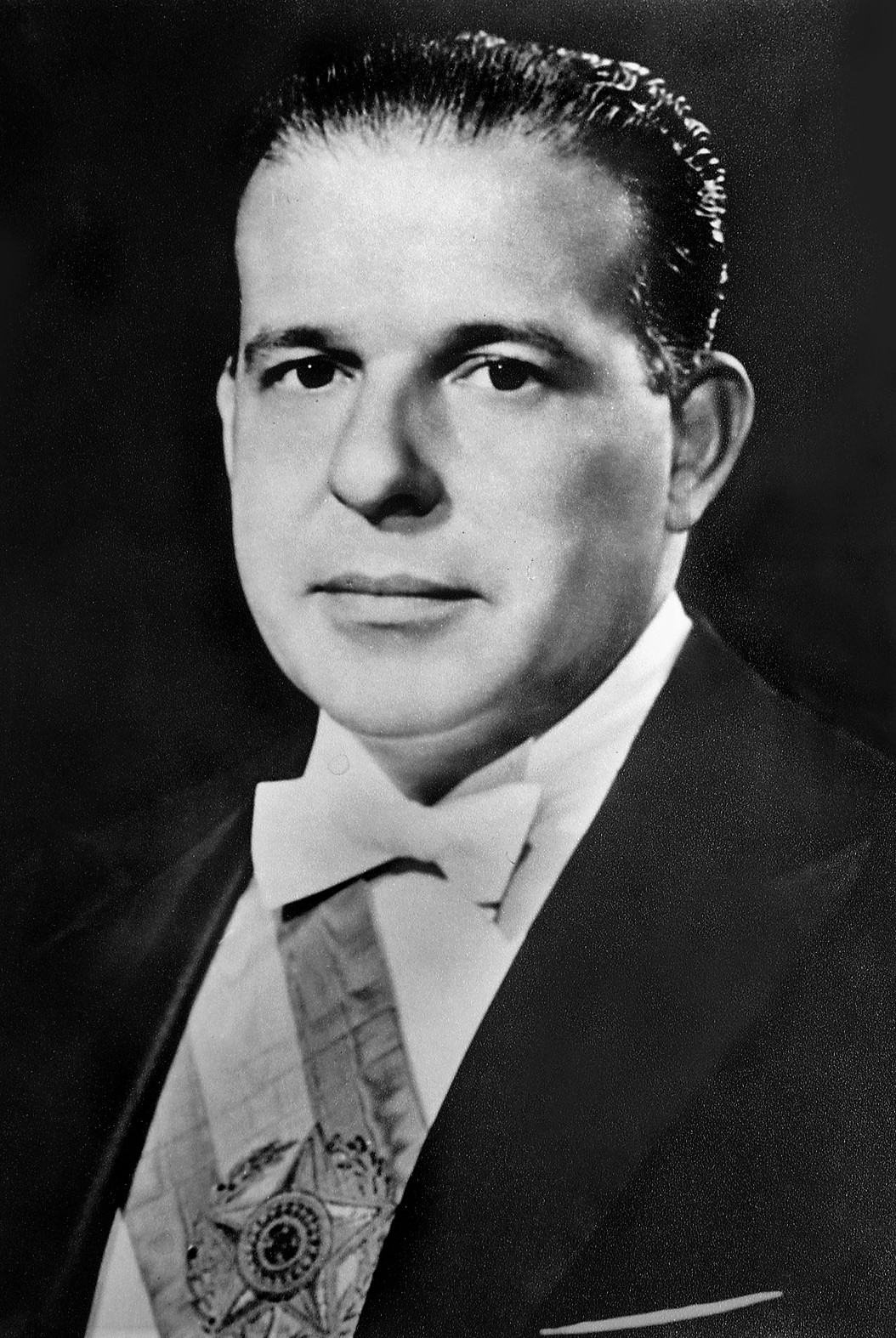
João Goulart was the left-leaning president ousted by the Armed Forces.

Brazil's political crisis stemmed from the way in which the political tensions had been controlled in the 1930s and 1940s during the Vargas Era. Vargas's dictatorship and the presidencies of his democratic successors marked different stages of Brazilian populism (1930–1964), an era of economic nationalism, state-guided modernization, and import substitution trade policies. Vargas's policies were intended to foster autonomous capitalist development in Brazil by linking industrialization to nationalism, a formula based on a strategy of reconciling the conflicting interests of the middle class, foreign capital, the working class, and the landed oligarchy.

Essentially, this was the culmination of the rise and fall of Brazilian populism from 1930 to 1964: Brazil witnessed over the course of this period the change from export-orientation of the First Brazilian Republic (1889–1930) to the import substitution of the populist era (1930–1964) and then the moderate structuralism of 1964–1980. Each of these structural changes forced a realignment in society and caused a period of political crisis. The military dictatorship marked the transition between the populist era and democratization.

The Brazilian Armed Forces acquired great political clout after the Paraguayan War. The politicization of the Armed Forces was evidenced by the Proclamation of the Republic, which overthrew the Brazilian Empire, or within tenentism (lieutenants' movement) and the Revolution of 1930. Tensions escalated again in the 1950s, as important military circles (the "hard-liners", old positivists whose origins could be traced back to the Brazilian Integralist Action and the Estado Novo) joined the elite and middle classes, and right-wing activists in attempts to prevent presidents Juscelino Kubitschek and João Goulart from taking office due to their supposed support for communism. Kubitschek proved to be friendly to capitalist institutions, but Goulart promised far-reaching reforms, expropriated business interests, and promoted economical-political neutrality with the United States.

After Goulart suddenly assumed power in 1961, society became deeply polarized, with the elites fearing that Brazil would, like Cuba, join the Communist Bloc, while others thought the reforms would boost Brazil's growth and end its economic subservience to the U.S., or even that Goulart could be used to increase the popularity of the Communist agenda. Influential politicians, such as Carlos Lacerda and Kubitschek, media moguls (Roberto Marinho, Octávio Frias, Júlio de Mesquita Filho), the Church, landowners, businessmen, and the middle class called for a coup d'état by the Armed Forces to remove the government. The old "hard-line" army officers, seeing a chance to impose their economic program, convinced the loyalists that Goulart was a Communist menace.

== Goulart and the fall of the Fourth Republic ==
After Kubitschek's presidency, the right-wing opposition elected Jânio Quadros, who campaigned on criticizing Kubitschek and government corruption. Quadros's campaign symbol was a broom, with which he would "sweep away the corruption". In his brief tenure as president, Quadros made moves to resume relations with socialist countries and approved controversial laws, but without legislative support, he could not follow his agenda.

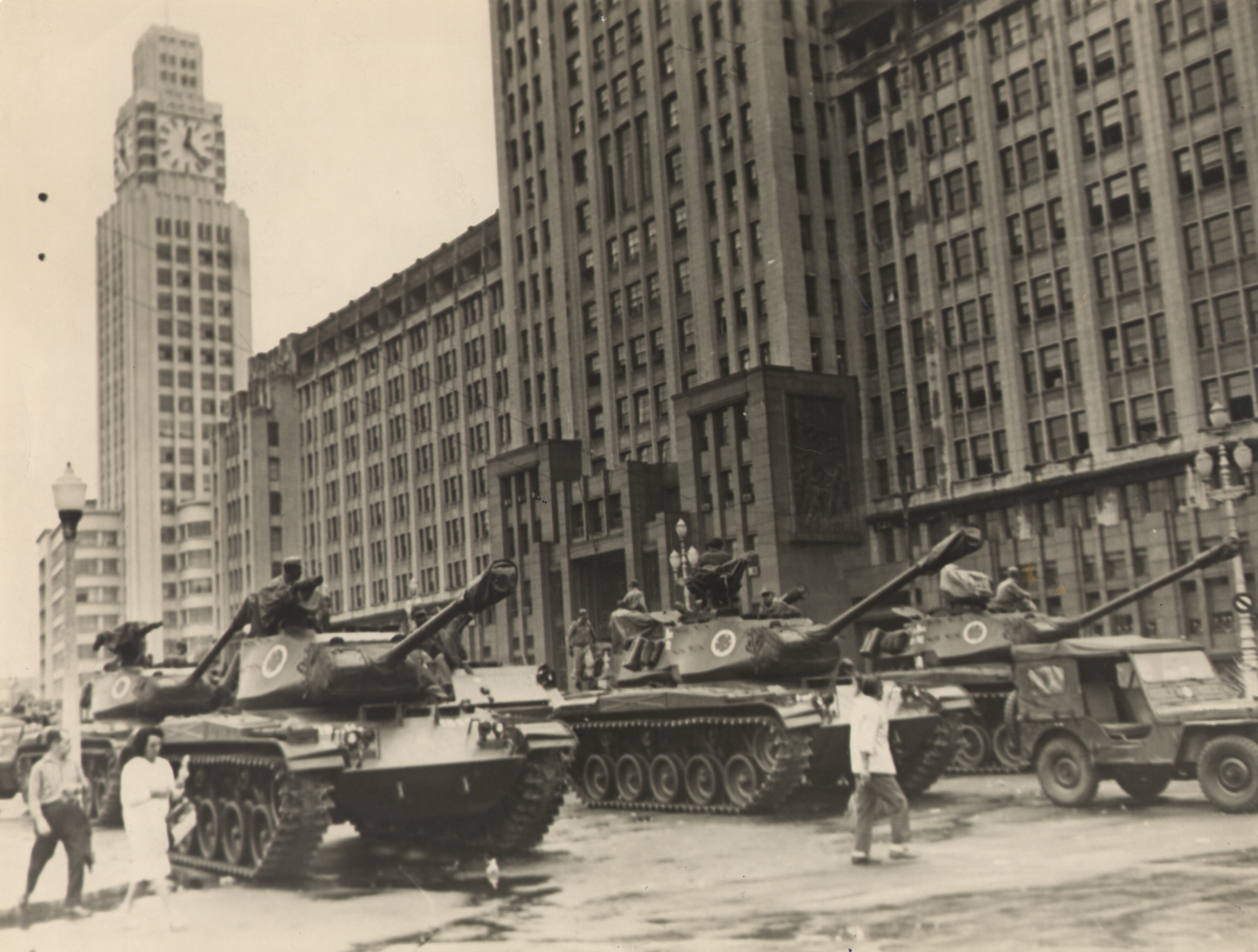
Brazilian army tanks on Presidente Vargas Avenue in Rio de Janeiro on April 2, 1964

In the last days of August 1961, Quadros tried to break his impasse with Congress by resigning as president, apparently intending to be reinstated by popular demand. The vice president, João Goulart, was a member of the Brazilian Labour Party and had been active in politics since the Vargas era. At that time, Brazil's president and vice president were elected on different party tickets. With Quadros's resignation, high-ranking military ministers tried to prevent Goulart, who was on a trip to China, from assuming the presidency, accusing him of being a Communist. The military's actions triggered the Legality Campaign in support of Goulart. The crisis was solved by the "parliamentary solution", a political compromise in which Goulart would take office, but with reduced powers, by turning Brazil into a parliamentary republic with a prime minister, Tancredo Neves.

Brazil returned to presidential government in 1963 after a referendum, and as Goulart's powers grew, it became evident that he would seek to implement his "base reforms" such as land reform and nationalization of enterprises in various economic sectors. The reforms were considered Communist and Goulart sought to implement them regardless of assent from established institutions such as Congress.

Goulart had low parliamentarian support after his attempts to win support from both sides of the spectrum came to alienate both. Over time, he was forced to shift to the left of his mentor Getúlio Vargas and to mobilize the working class and even the peasantry amid declining urban bourgeois support.

On 1 April 1964, after a night of conspiracy, rebel troops led by general Olímpio Mourão Filho made their way to Rio de Janeiro, considered a legalist bastion. São Paulo's and Rio de Janeiro's generals were convinced to join the coup. To prevent civil war and knowing that the United States would openly support the rebels, Goulart fled to Rio Grande do Sul, and then into exile in Uruguay, where his family owned large estates.

=== United States involvement ===
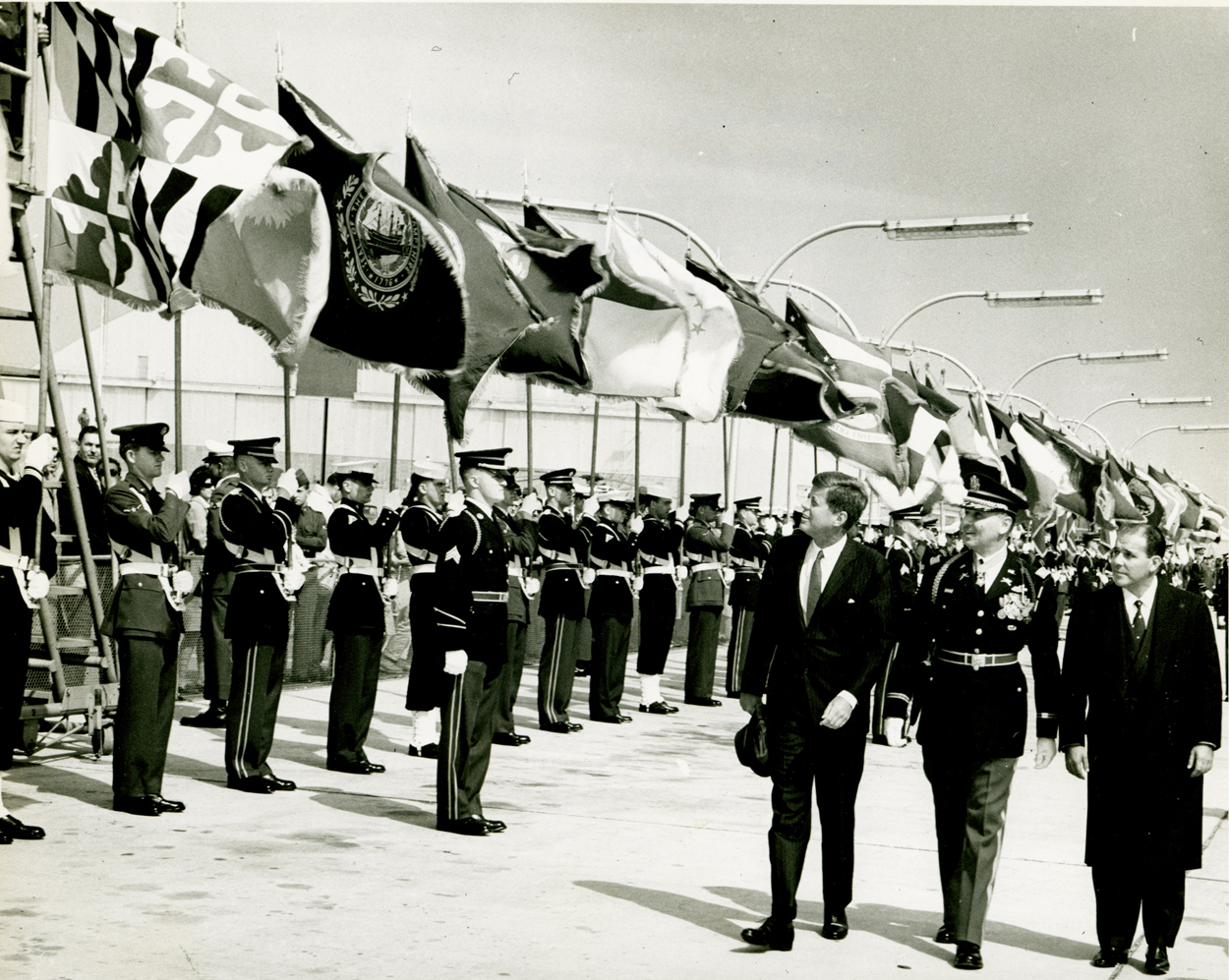
U.S. President John F. Kennedy (left) and President Goulart during a review of troops on 3 April 1962. Kennedy mulled possible military intervention in Brazil.

U.S. ambassador Lincoln Gordon later admitted that the embassy had given money to anti-Goulart candidates in the 1962 municipal elections and encouraged the plotters; many extra U.S. military and intelligence personnel were operating in four U.S. Navy oil tankers and the aircraft carrier USS Forrestal, in an operation code-named Brother Sam. The ships were positioned off the coast of Rio de Janeiro in case rebel Brazilian troops required military assistance during the 1964 coup. A 1963 document from Gordon to U.S. President John F. Kennedy describes the ways Goulart should be put down, and his fears of a communist intervention supported by the Soviets or by Cuba.

Washington immediately recognized the new government in 1964, and hailed the coup as one of the "democratic forces" that had allegedly staved off international communism. American mass media outlets such as Henry Luce's Time magazine also favorably assessed the dissolution of political parties and salary controls at the beginning of Castelo Branco's term. According to Vincent Bevins, the military dictatorship established in Brazil, the fifth most populous nation in the world, "played a crucial role in pushing the rest of South America into the pro-Washington, anticommunist group of nations."

Brazil actively participated in the CIA-backed state terror campaign against left-wing dissidents known as Operation Condor.

=== Alleged communist threat ===
The argument used to justify the establishment of military dictatorship in Brazil was the imminence of a "Communist threat" in 1964. The historian Rodrigo Patto Sá Motta disputes that communism had sufficient support in Brazil to threaten the democratic system in 1964. In an interview, Motta said:

If the political regime established in 1964 was popular and had the majority support of the population, why the hell did it need authoritarian mechanisms to stay in power? ... Let us consider for a moment, just to construct hypothetical reasoning, that there was a serious communist threat and the military intervention aimed at defending democracy against totalitarianism (I reiterate that I consider such arguments unfounded). If so, what justification, then, for having installed a dictatorship and ending up in power for two decades? Why did they not hand over power to civilians after the "threat" had been defeated?

— Rodrigo Patto Sá Motta, 1964: "O Brasil não estava à beira do comunismo"

Instead, Motta argued that the assertion of a "Communist threat" was fabricated to unify the Brazilian armed forces and increase their support among the general population.

the big press and other institutions made a strong discursive dam in favor of the fall of Goulart, in which they mobilized to exhaustion the theme of red danger (communists) to increase the climate of panic. What is certain is that on leaving the HQs the Armed Forces unbalanced the situation and promoted the overthrow of Goulart, so their role was essential in the coup.

The Intercept reported that the asserted threat of Jango's "guerrillas", the weapons in possession of the Peasant Leagues, and the communist infiltrations into the armed forces were nothing more than fantasy, and that "there was no resistance" to the 1964 coup. Moreover, the Communist armed struggles only appeared after the implementation of the dictatorship, not before it, and in fact never put Brazilian democracy at risk.

== Divisions within the officer corps ==
The armed forces' officer corps was divided between those who believed that they should confine themselves to their barracks and the hard-liners who regarded politicians as willing to turn Brazil to Communism. The hard-liners' victory dragged Brazil into what political scientist Juan J. Linz called "an authoritarian situation". But because the hard-liners could not ignore their colleagues' opinions or societal resistance, they could not institutionalize their agenda politically. In addition, they did not attempt to eliminate liberal constitutionalism, because they feared international disapproval and damage to their alignment with the United States. The United States as bastion of anticommunism during the Cold War provided the ideology the authoritarians used to justify their hold on power. Washington also preached liberal democracy, which forced the authoritarians to assume the contradictory position of defending democracy while destroying it. Their concern for appearances caused them to abstain from personal dictatorship by requiring each successive general-president to hand over power to a successor.

Presidents of Brazil during the military dictatorship

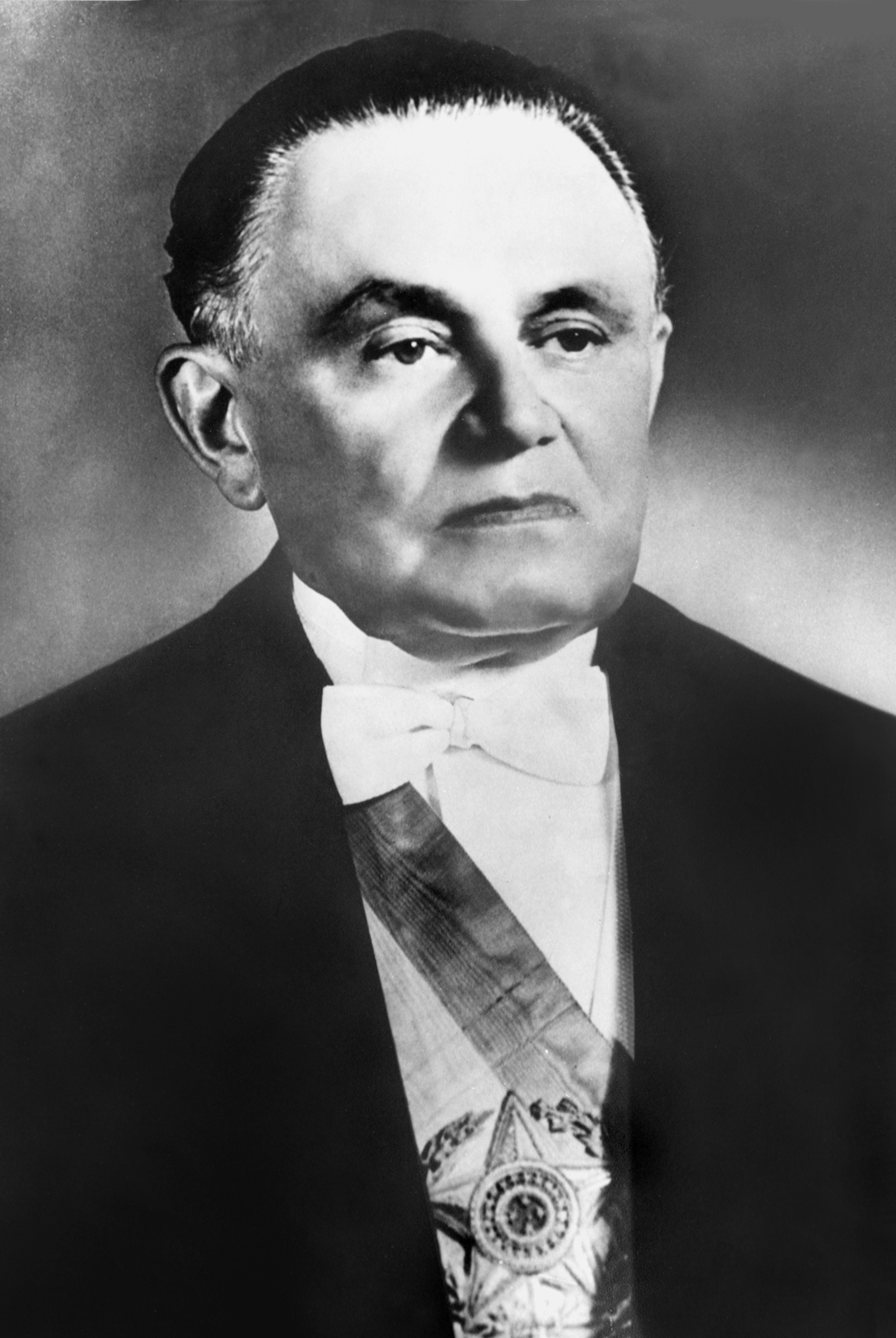
Field marshal
Humberto de Alencar Castelo Branco

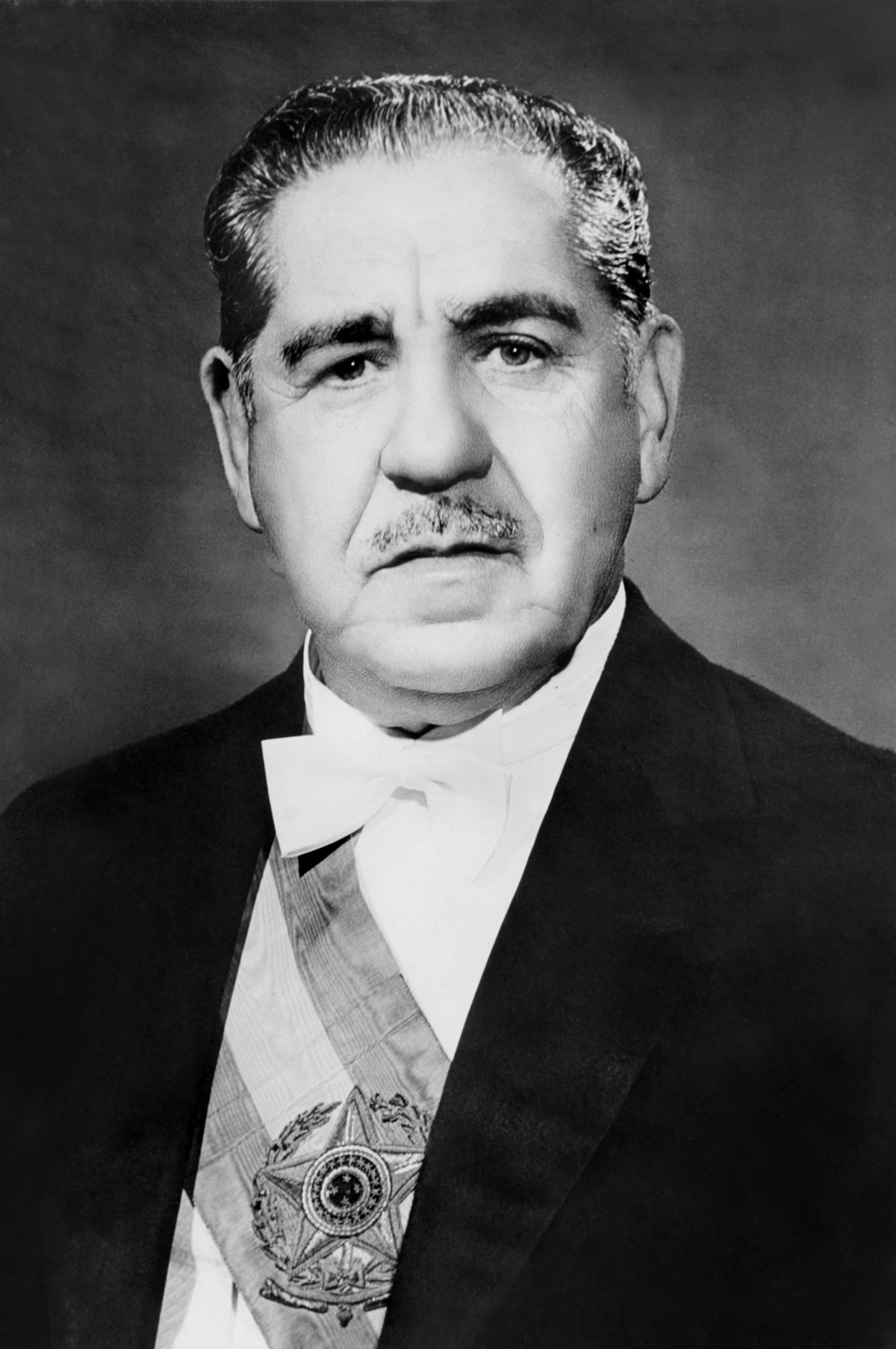
Field marshal
Artur da Costa e Silva

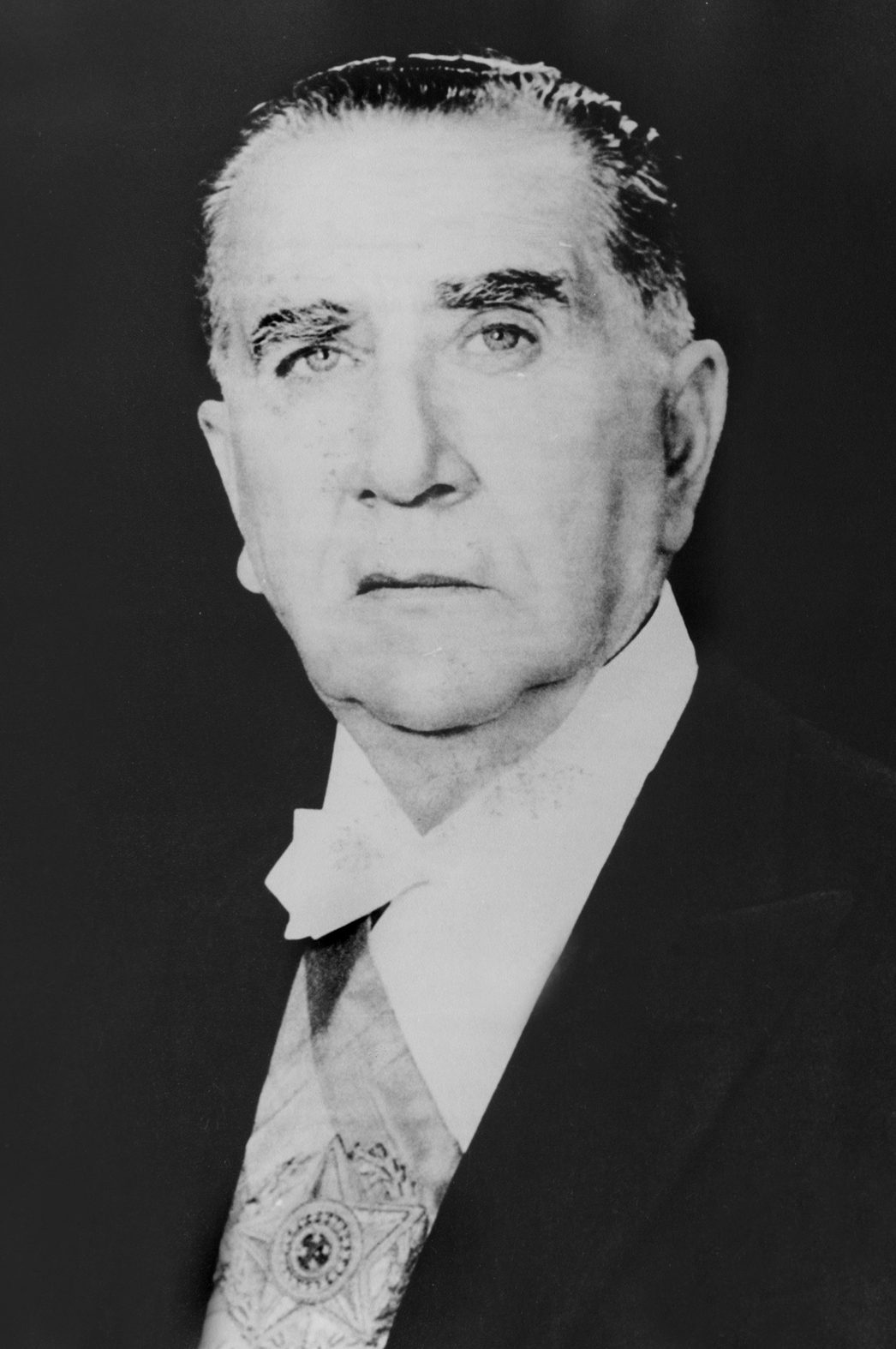
General
Emílio Garrastazu Médici

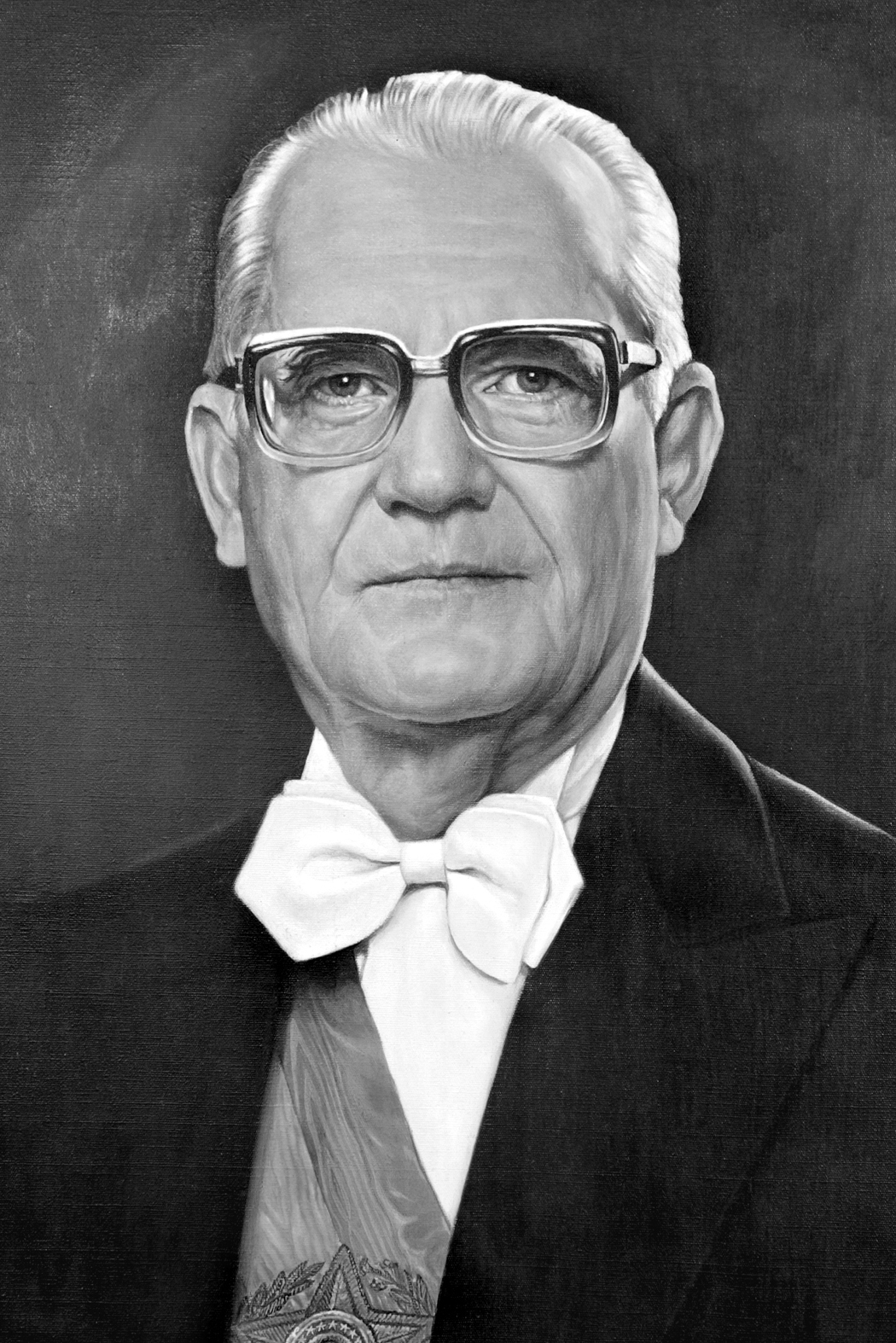
General
Ernesto Geisel

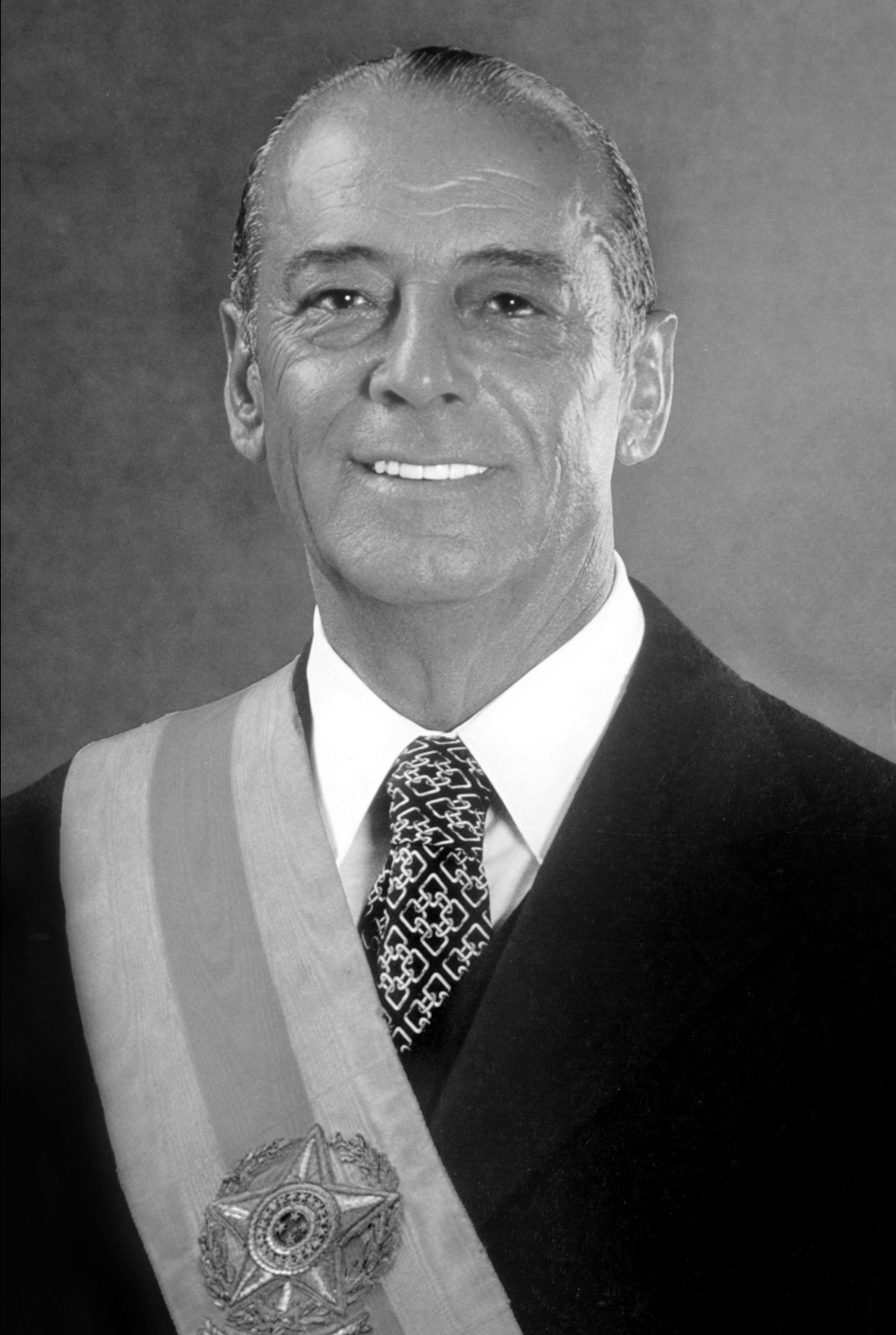
General
João Figueiredo

== Establishing the regime, Castelo Branco ==
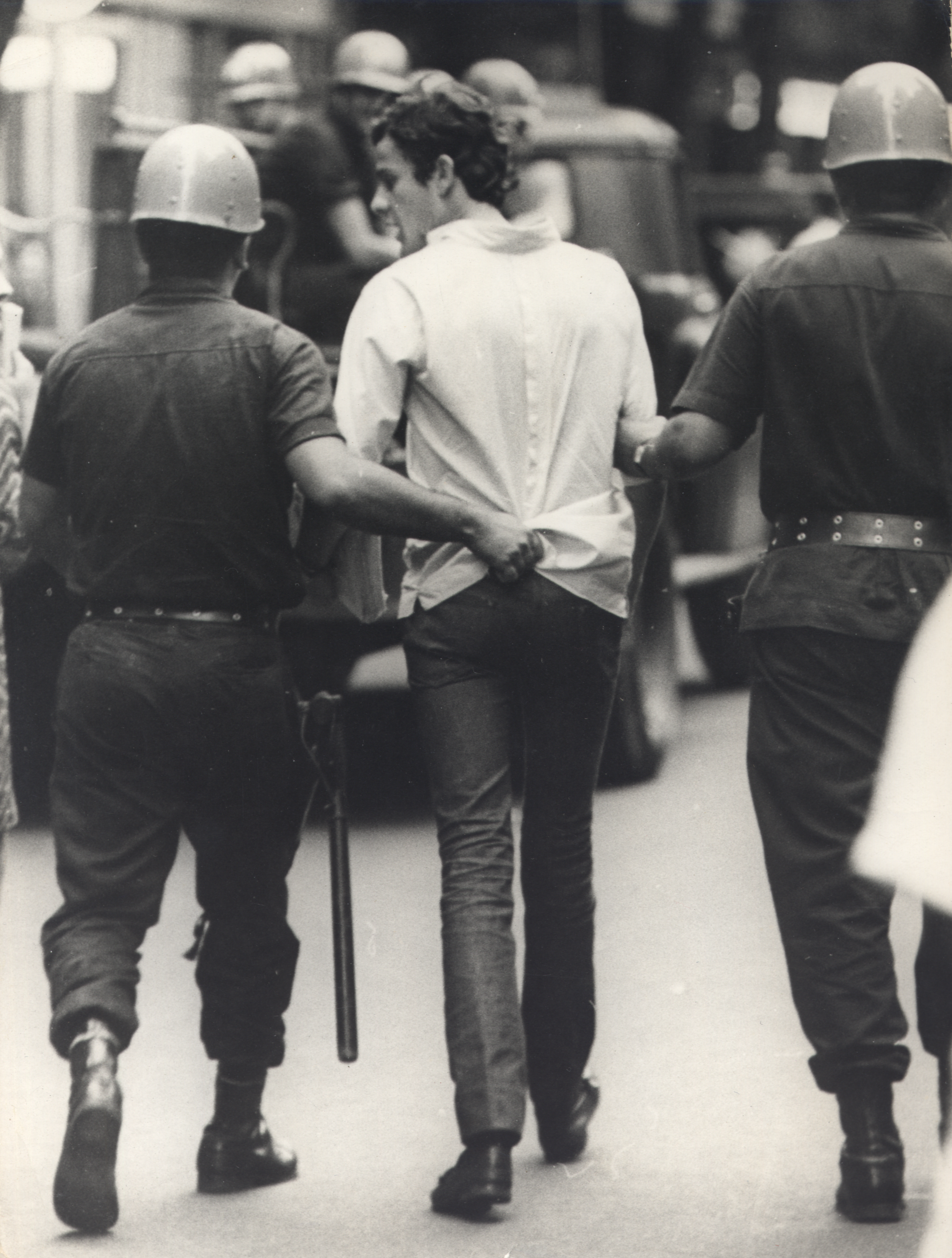
A student being arrested by the Army Police during an anti-dictatorship protest in 1968

The Brazilian Army could find no civilian politician acceptable to all the factions that supported Goulart's ouster. On 9 April 1964, coup leaders published the First Institutional Act, which greatly limited the civil liberties of the 1946 constitution. The act granted the president the authority to remove elected officials, dismiss civil servants, and revoke for 10 years the political rights of those found guilty of subversion or misuse of public funds. On 11 April 1964, Congress elected the Army Chief of Staff, marshal Humberto de Alencar Castelo Branco, president for the remainder of Goulart's term.

Castelo Branco intended to oversee radical reform of the political-economic system and then return power to elected officials. He refused to remain in power beyond the remainder of Goulart's term or to institutionalize the military in power. But competing demands changed the situation. Military hard-liners wanted a complete purge of left-wing and populist influences and civilian politicians obstructed Castelo Branco's reforms. The latter accused him of hard-line actions to achieve his objectives, and the former accused him of leniency. On 27 October 1965, after opposition candidates won two state elections, he signed the Second Institutional act, which purged Congress, removed objectionable state governors, and expanded the president's arbitrary powers at the expense of the legislative and judiciary branches. This gave him the latitude to repress the populist left but also provided the subsequent governments of Artur da Costa e Silva (1967–69) and Emílio Garrastazu Médici (1969–74) with a "legal" basis for their hard-line authoritarian rule.

But this is no military dictatorship. If it were, Carlos Lacerda would never be allowed to say the things he says. Everything in Brazil is free—but controlled.

– Minister of Transportation and colonel Mario Andreazza to journalist Carl Rowan, 1967

Through the Institutional Acts, Castelo Branco gave the executive unchecked power to change the constitution and remove anyone from office as well as to have the president elected by Congress. A two-party system was created: the ruling government-backed National Renewal Alliance (ARENA) and the mild not-leftist opposition Brazilian Democratic Movement (MDB). In the Constitution of 1967 the name of the country was changed from United States of Brazil to the Federative Republic of Brazil.

== Hardening of the regime, Costa e Silva ==
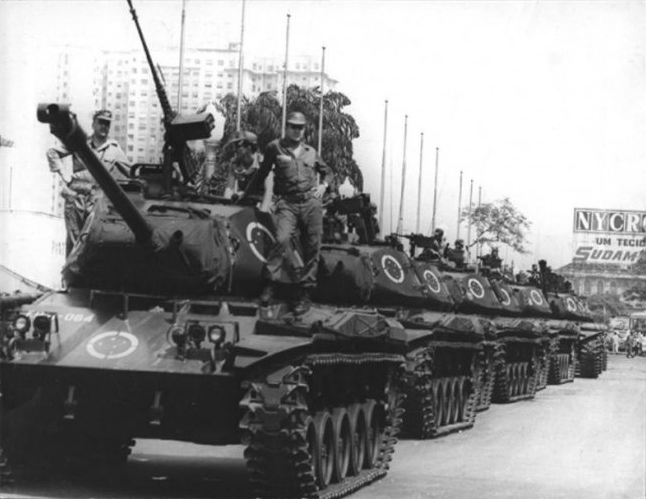
A column of M41 Walker Bulldog tanks along the streets of Rio de Janeiro in April 1968

Castelo Branco was succeeded as president by General Artur da Costa e Silva, a representative of the hard-line elements. On 13 December 1968, he signed the Fifth Institutional Act, which gave the president dictatorial powers, dissolved Congress and state legislatures, suspended the constitution, and imposed censorship. On 31 August 1969 Costa e Silva suffered a stroke. Instead of his vice president, all state power was assumed by military junta, which chose General Emílio Garrastazu Médici as the new president.

== Years of Lead, Médici ==
Brazil: love it or leave it, a slogan of the military regime.

A hardliner, Médici sponsored the regime's greatest human rights abuses. During his government, persecution and torture of dissidents, harassment of journalists, and press censorship became ubiquitous. The succession of kidnappings of foreign ambassadors in Brazil embarrassed the military government. The anti-government demonstrations and the action of guerrilla movements generated an increase in repressive measures. Urban guerrillas from the National Liberation Action and the 8th October Revolutionary Movement were suppressed and military operations undertaken to finish the Araguaia Guerrilla War.

The "ideological frontiers" of Brazilian foreign policy were reinforced. By late 1970, the official minimum wage dropped to $40 per month, reducing the purchasing power of over one-third of the Brazilian workforce—whose wages were tied to it—by about 50% compared to 1960 levels under Kubitschek's administration.

Nevertheless, Médici was popular, as his term saw the largest economic growth of any Brazilian president as the Brazilian Miracle unfolded and the country won the 1970 World Cup. In 1971 Médici presented the First National Development Plan aimed at increasing the rate of economic growth, especially in remote Northeast and the Amazon. This policy consolidated the option for the national-development model and Brazil's foreign economic connections were transformed, broadening its international presence.

In November 1970, federal, state, and municipal elections were held. Most of the seats were won by ARENA candidates. In 1973, an electoral college system was established, and in January 1974 General Ernesto Geisel was elected president.

== Resistance ==
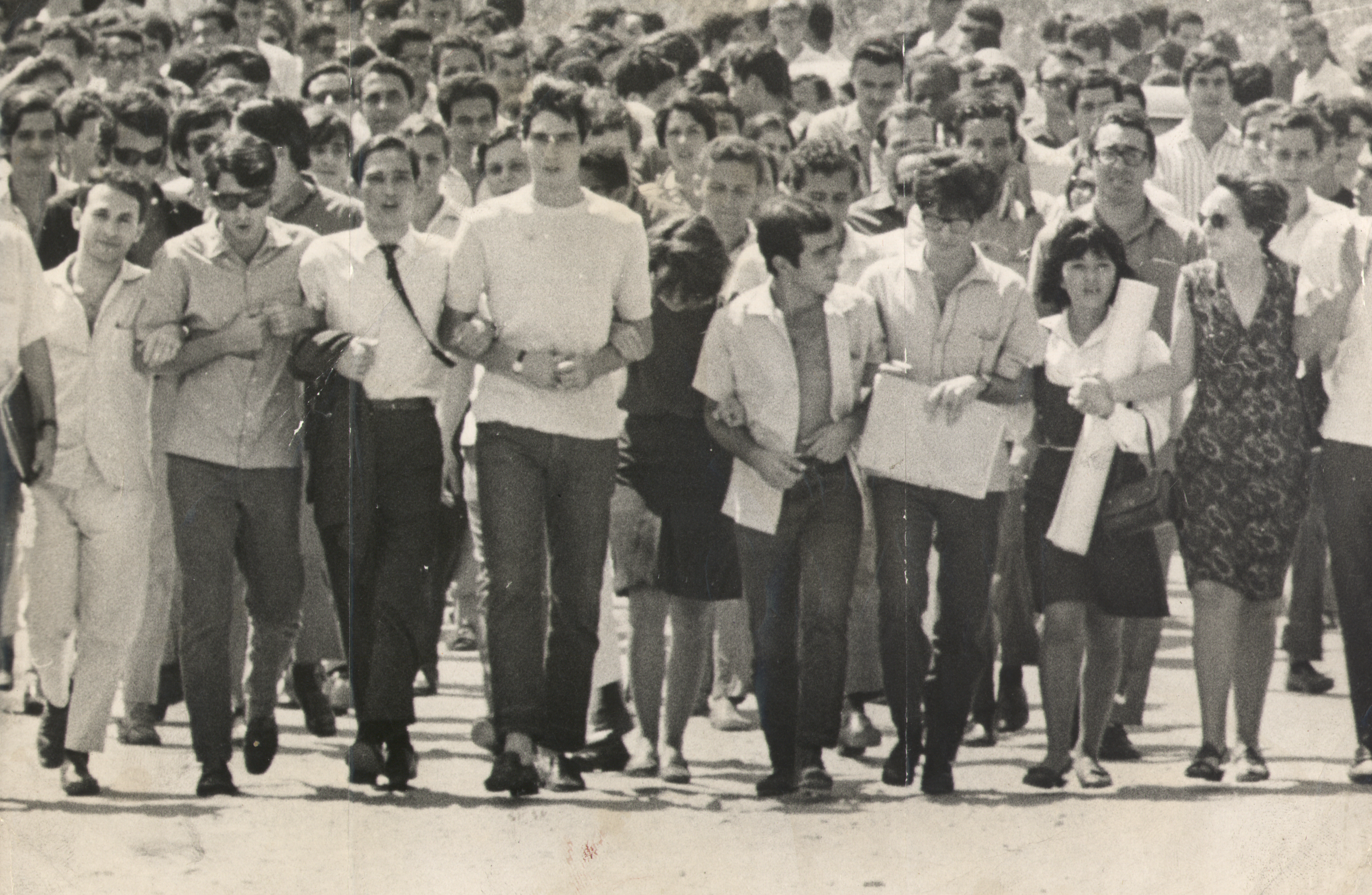
Students march against the military dictatorship, 1966

Goulart's fall worried many citizens. Many students, Marxists, and workers formed groups that opposed military rule. A minority of these adopted direct armed struggle, while most supported political solutions to reverse the mass suspension of human rights in the country. In the first few months after the coup, thousands of people were detained, while thousands of others were removed from their civil service or university positions.

In 1968 there was a brief relaxation of the nation's repressive policies. Experimental artists and musicians formed the Tropicália movement during this time. However, some of the major popular musicians such as Gilberto Gil and Caetano Veloso, for instance, were arrested, imprisoned, and exiled. Chico Buarque also left the country to live in exile in Italy.

In 1969 the 8th October Revolutionary Movement kidnapped Charles Burke Elbrick, the U.S. ambassador to Brazil. The resistance fighters demanded the release of imprisoned dissidents who were being tortured in exchange for Elbrick. The government responded by adopting more brutal measures of counter-insurgency, leading to the assassination of Carlos Marighella, a guerrilla leader, two months after Elbrick's kidnapping. This marked the beginning of the decline of armed opposition. In 1970, Nobuo Okuchi, the Japanese consul general in Sāo Paulo, was kidnapped, while Curtis C. Cutter, the U.S. consul in Porto Alegre, was wounded in the shoulder but escaped being kidnapped. Also in 1970, Ehrenfried von Holleben, the West German ambassador, was kidnapped in Rio de Janeiro and one of his bodyguards was killed.

== Daily life ==
During the military dictatorship, censorship affected many aspects of everyday cultural life in Brazil. Books, newspapers, television programs, theater productions, and even popular music were required to undergo an analysis by the government censors before reaching the public. Journalists, for example, sometimes responded by leaving blank spaces or replacing censored material with random material, showing the readers that there was interference by the government. Musicians and artists often used metaphor and indirect language to criticize the government while trying to avoid the censorship. Some cultural movements such as Tropicália came out during this period and used all kinds of art to challenge political repression.

Despite repression and censorship, the military government had support among some sectors of the population, specifically during the period of economic growth known as the Brazilian Miracle (approximately 1968–1973). During this period of time Brazil experienced high rates of economic expansion, industrial growth, and large infrastructure projects, which improved opportunities and for parts of the population access to consumer goods. As a result of all that, some Brazilians saw the government positively during this period, even while there was almost no political freedom and opposition was suppressed.

== Repression ==
After the military coup, the new government put forward a series of measures to strengthen its rule and weaken the opposition. The complex structure of the state's repression reached several areas of Brazilian society, and involved the implementation of measures of censorship, persecutions, and violations of human rights.

The systematic repression during this period in the Brazilian history was dependent on and alternated between the so-called "moderates" ("moderados") and "hard-liners" ("linha dura") in power. The most aggressive set of repressive measures took place during the period between 1968 and 1978, called the "Years of Lead" (Anos de Chumbo), but the regime's repressive character was present in Brazilian society throughout the military rule.

=== Censorship ===
The mainstream media, initially cooperating with the military intervention on the eve of the coup, later opposed the government and thus fell under heavy censorship. The management of all sectors of the country's communication was overseen by the Special Counsel of Public Relations (Assessoria Especial de Relações Públicas) created in the beginning of 1968, while censorship was institutionalized through the Higher Counsel of Censorship (Conselho Superior de Censura) later on that same year.

The Higher Counsel of Censorship was overseen by the Ministry of Justice, which was in charge of analysing and revising decisions put forward by the director of the Federal Police department. The ministry was also responsible for establishing guidelines and norms to implement censorship at local levels. Institutionalized censorship affected all areas of communication in Brazilian society: newspaper, television, music, theater, and all industries related to mass communication activities, including marketing companies.

Despite the regime's efforts to censor any and all pieces of media that could hurt the government, the population found ways to get around it as much as possible. Even though artists and journalists needed permission from the counsel to publish any piece of communication, they sometimes were able to surpass censorship barriers through unconventional ways. Musicians would rely on word play to publish songs with veiled criticisms towards the government while famous newspapers would fill in empty spaces left blank due to censored articles with random cake recipes, a way to indicate to the population that the content had been censored by the government.

=== Human rights violations ===
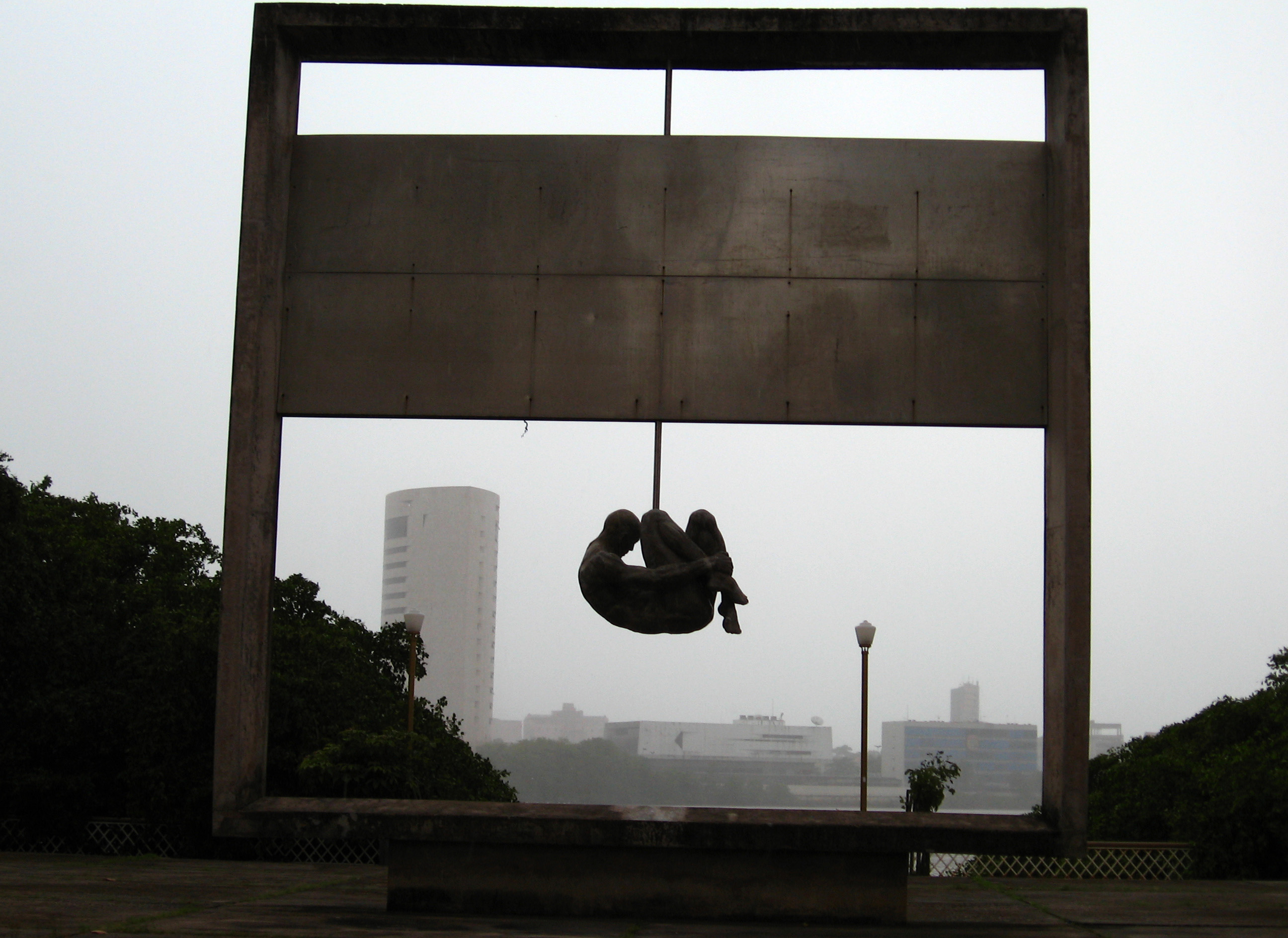
Monument Tortura Nunca Mais (torture never again), dedicated to the victims of torture in Recife (inaugurated 1993)

As early as 1964, the military government was already using the various forms of torture it devised systematically not only to gain information it used to crush opposition groups, but also to intimidate and silence any further potential opponents. This radically increased after 1968.

While other dictatorships in the region at the time killed more people, Brazil saw the widespread use of torture, as it also had during the Estado Novo of Getúlio Vargas. Vargas's enforcer Filinto Müller has been named the "patron of torturers" in Brazil. Advisors from the United States and United Kingdom trained Brazilian forces in interrogation and torture. To extinguish its left-wing opponents, the dictatorship used arbitrary arrests, imprisonment without trials, kidnapping, and most of all, torture, which included rape and castration. The book Torture in Brazil provides accounts of only a fraction of the atrocities committed by the government.

The military government murdered hundreds of others, although this was done mostly in secret and the cause of death often falsely reported as accidental. The government occasionally dismembered and hid the bodies. French general Paul Aussaresses, a veteran of the Algerian War, came to Brazil in 1973. Aussaresses used "counter-revolutionary warfare" methods during the Battle of Algiers, including the systemic use of torture, executions and death flights. He later trained U.S. officers and taught military courses for Brazil's military intelligence. He later acknowledged maintaining close links with the military.

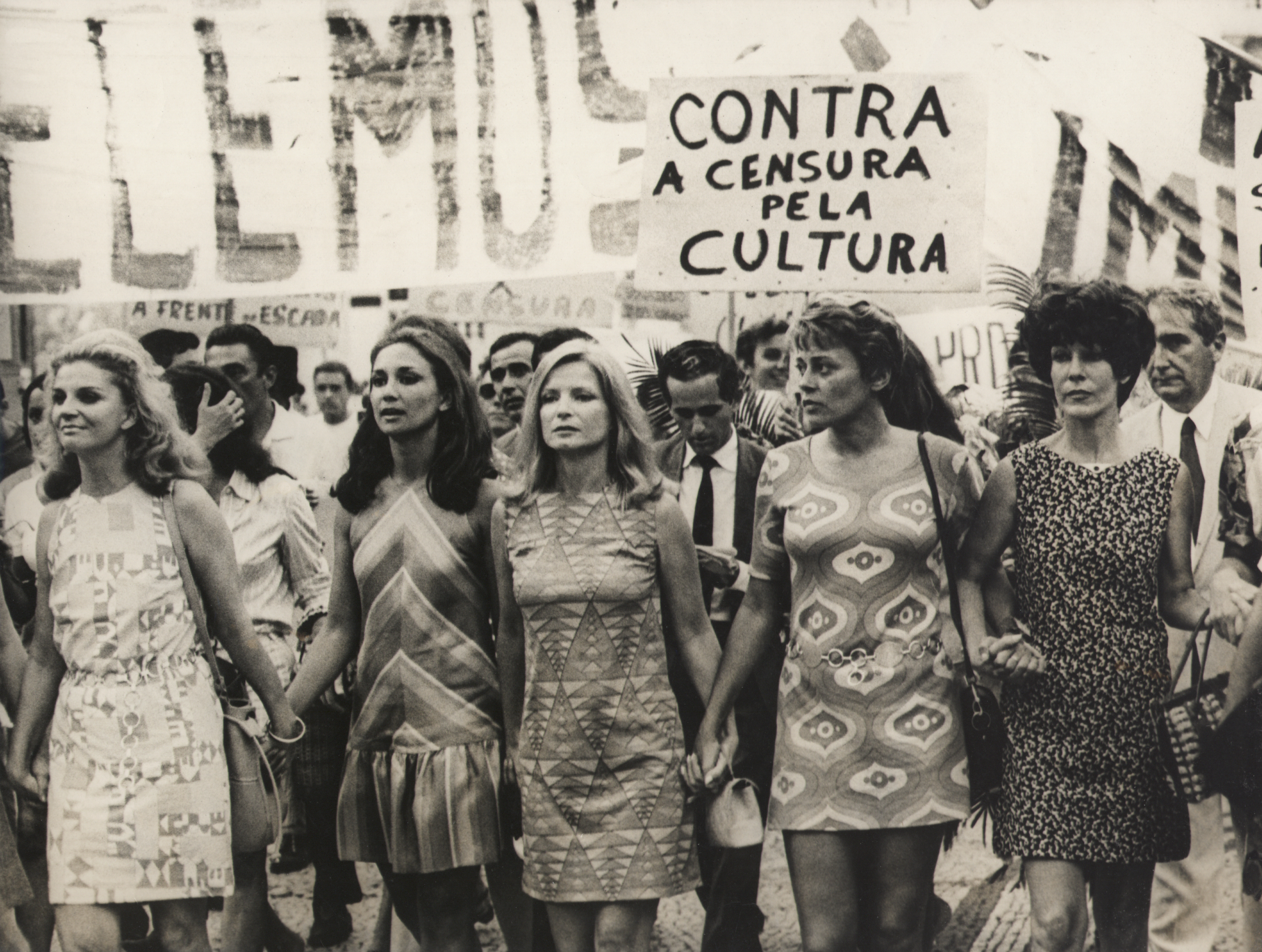
Actresses Tônia Carrero, Eva Wilma, Odete Lara, Norma Bengell and Cacilda Becker at the Cultura contra Censura (culture against censorship) protest in February 1968

Despite the dictatorship's fall, no individual has been punished for the human rights violations, due to the 1979 Amnesty Law written by the members of the government who stayed in place during the transition to democracy. The law granted amnesty and impunity to any government official or citizen accused of political crimes during the dictatorship. Because of a certain "cultural amnesia" in Brazil, the victims have never garnered much sympathy, respect, or acknowledgement of their suffering.

Work is underway to alter the Amnesty Law, which has been condemned by the Inter-American Court of Human Rights. The National Truth Commission was created in 2011 attempting to help the nation face its past and honour those who fought for democracy, and to compensate the family members of those killed or disappeared. Its work was concluded in 2014. It reported that under military regime at least 191 people were killed and 243 "disappeared". The total number of deaths probably measures in the hundreds, not reaching but could be nearing one thousand, while more than 50,000 people were detained and 10,000 forced to go into exile.

According to the Comissão de Direitos Humanos e Assistência Jurídica da Ordem dos Advogados do Brasil, the "Brazilian death toll from government torture, assassination and 'disappearances' for 1964–81 was [...] 333, which included 67 killed in the Araguaia guerrilla front in 1972–74". According to the Brazilian Army, 97 military and civilians were killed by terrorist and guerrilla actions made by leftist groups during the same period. In a 2014 report by Brazil's National Truth Commission, which documented the human rights abuses of the military government, it was noted that the United States "had spent years teaching the torture techniques to the Brazilian military during that period".

== Geisel government, distensão, and 1973 oil shock ==
Retired general Ernesto Geisel (1974–79) was elected to the presidency with Médici's approval in 1974, a year after the oil crisis. Geisel was a well-connected army general and former president of Petrobras. There had been intense behind-the-scenes maneuvering by the hard-liners against him, but also by the more moderate supporters of Castelo Branco in his support. Geisel's older brother Orlando Geisel was the Minister of Army, and his close ally General João Batista Figueiredo was chief of Médici's military staff. Once in power, Geisel adopted a more moderate stance with regard to political opposition than Médici's.

=== Decompression policy ===
Although not immediately understood by civilians, Geisel's accession signaled a move toward a less oppressive rule. He replaced several regional commanders with trusted officers and labeled his political programmes "abertura" (opening) and distensão (decompression), meaning a gradual relaxation of authoritarian rule. It would be, in his words, "the maximum of development possible with the minimum of indispensable security".

Together with his Chief of Staff, Golbery do Couto e Silva, Geisel devised a plan of gradual, slow democratization that succeeded despite threats and opposition from the hard-liners. But the torture of the regime's left-wing and Communist opponents by DOI-CODI was still ongoing, as demonstrated by the murder of Vladimir Herzog.

Geisel allowed the opposition Brazilian Democratic Movement (MDB) to run an almost free election campaign before the November 1974 elections, and the MDB won more votes than ever. When the MDB won more seats in the 1976 Congress elections, Geisel used the powers granted to him by AI-5 to dismiss Congress in April 1977, and introduced a new set of laws (April Package) that made gubernatorial elections indirect and created an electoral college for electing the next president, thus safeguarding ARENA positions.

In 1977 and 1978 the presidential succession issue caused further political confrontation with the hard-liners. In October 1977 Geisel suddenly dismissed the far-right Minister of the Army, General Sylvio Frota, who had tried to become a candidate for the next presidency. In May 1978 Geisel faced the first labour strikes since 1964. Over 500,000 workers led by the future president Lula da Silva demanded and won a 11% wage increase.

By the end of his presidency Geisel had allowed exiled citizens to return, restored habeas corpus, repealed the extraordinary powers, ended the Fifth Institutional Act in December 1978, and instated General João Figueiredo as his successor in March 1979.

=== Economy ===
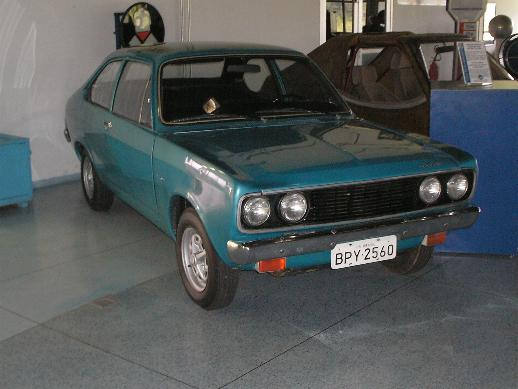
A Dodge 1800 was the first prototype engineered with an ethanol-only engine. Exhibit at the Memorial Aeroespacial Brasileiro, CTA, São José dos Campos.

Geisel sought to maintain the high economic growth rates of the Brazilian Miracle which were tied to maintaining the prestige of the regime, even while seeking to deal with the effects of the 1973 oil crisis. Geisel removed the long-time Minister of Finance Antônio Delfim Netto. He maintained massive state investments in infrastructure—motorways, telecommunications, hydroelectric dams, mineral extraction, factories, and nuclear energy. All this required more international borrowing and increased state debt.

Fending off nationalist objections, he opened Brazil to oil prospecting by foreign firms for the first time since the early 1950s. Geisel also tried to reduce Brazil's reliance on oil by signing a US$10 billion agreement with West Germany to build eight nuclear reactors in Brazil. During this time, an ethanol production initiative was promoted as an alternative to gasoline and the first ethanol fueled cars were produced in the country.

Brazil suffered drastic reductions in its terms of trade as a result of the oil crisis. In the early 1970s, the performance of the export sector was undermined by an overvalued currency. With the trade balance under pressure, the oil shock led to a sharply higher import bill. Thus, the Geisel government borrowed billions of dollars to see Brazil through the oil crisis. This strategy was effective in promoting growth, but it also raised Brazil's import requirements markedly, increasing the already large current-account deficit. The current account was financed by running up the foreign debt. The expectation was that the combined effects of import substitution industrialization and export expansion eventually would bring about growing trade surpluses, allowing the service and repayment of the foreign debt.

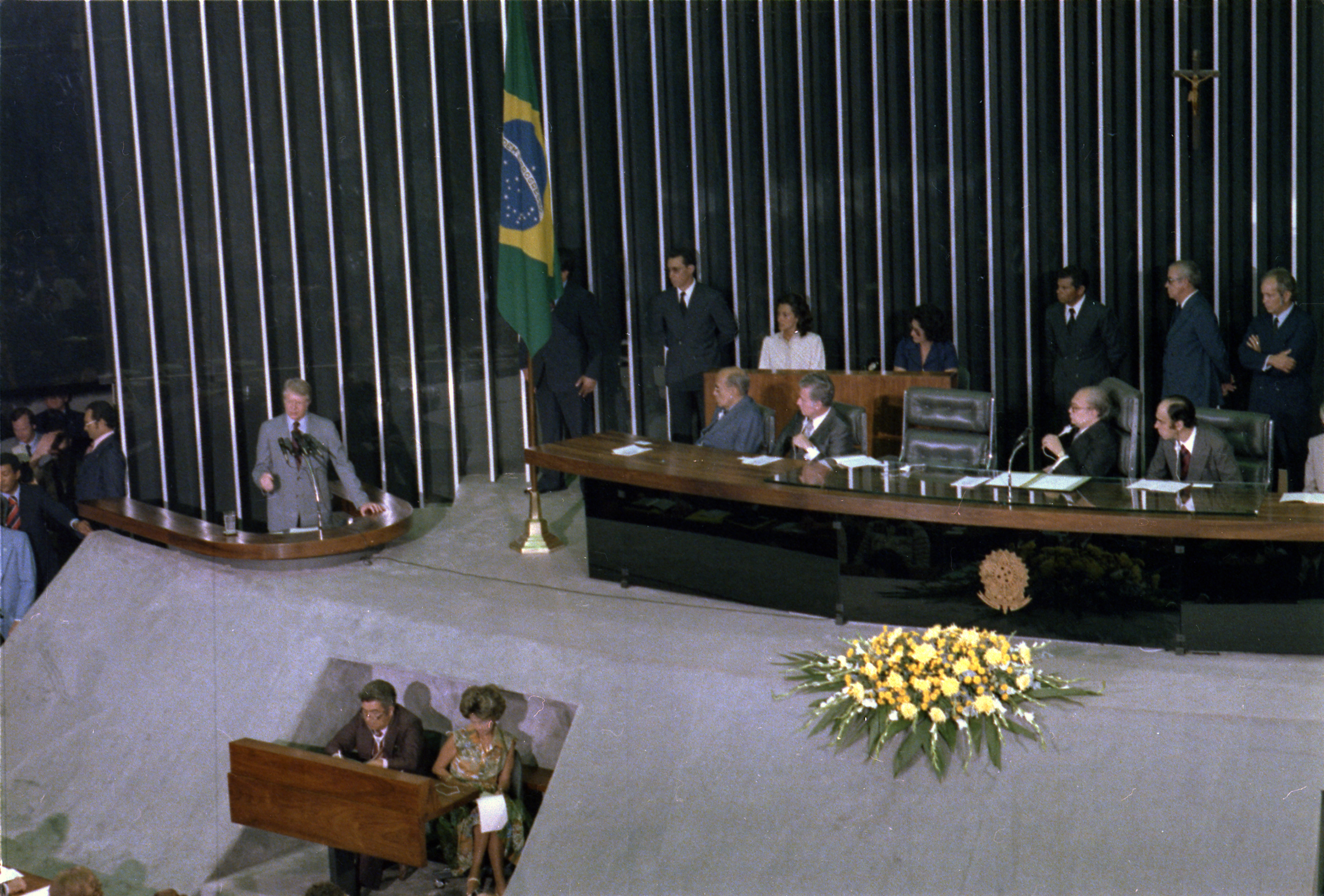
U.S. President Jimmy Carter addresses the Brazilian Congress, 30 March 1978

Brazil shifted its foreign policy to meet its economic needs. "Responsible pragmatism" replaced strict alignment with the United States and a worldview based on ideological frontiers and blocs of nations. Because Brazil was 80% dependent on imported oil, Geisel shifted the country from uncritical support of Israel to a more neutral stance on Middle Eastern affairs. His government also recognized the People's Republic of China and the new socialist governments of Angola and Mozambique, both former Portuguese colonies. The government moved closer to Latin America, Europe, and Japan.

Brazil's intention to build nuclear reactors with West Germany's help created tensions with the U.S. which did not want to see a nuclear Brazil. After the election of Jimmy Carter as president, a greater emphasis was put on human rights. The new Harkin Amendment limited American military assistance to countries with human rights violations. Brazilian right-wingers and military viewed this as an incursion on Brazilian sovereignty and Geisel renounced any future military aid from the United States in April 1977.

== Transition to democracy, Figueiredo ==
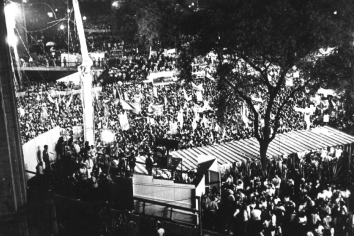
Pro-democracy Diretas Já protest in 1984

President João Figueiredo steered the country back to democracy and promoted the transfer of power to civilian rule, facing opposition from hardliners in the military. Figueiredo was an army general and former head of the secret service, the National Information Service.

As president, Figueiredo continued the gradual "abertura" process that had begun in 1974. The Amnesty Law, signed by Figueiredo on August 28, 1979, amnestied those convicted of "political" or "related" crimes between 1961 and 1978. In the early 1980s, the military regime could no longer effectively maintain the two-party system established in 1966. The Figueiredo administration dissolved the government-controlled ARENA and allowed new parties to form. Figueiredo was often incapacitated by illness and took two prolonged leaves for health treatment in 1981 and 1983, but the civilian Vice President Aureliano Chaves did not enjoy major political power.

In 1981 Congress enacted a law restoring direct elections of state governors. The general election of 1982 brought a narrow victory to ARENA's successor, pro-government Democratic Social Party, with 43.22% of the vote while the opposition Brazilian Democratic Movement Party received 42.96%. The opposition won the governorship of three major states, São Paulo, Rio de Janeiro, and Minas Gerais.

But political developments were overshadowed by increasing economic problems. As inflation and unemployment soared, foreign debt reached massive proportions, making Brazil the world's biggest debtor, owing about US$90 billion to international lenders. The government's austerity measures brought no signs of economic recovery.

In 1984, the movement known as Diretas Já took over the country and epitomized the newly regained freedoms of assembly and expression, but its primary objective was not attained, and the 1985 presidential election was held indirectly via a selected electoral college. The opposition strived vigorously to pass a constitutional amendment allowing direct popular presidential elections in November 1984, but the proposal failed in Congress. The opposition candidate Tancredo Neves succeeded Figueiredo when Congress held the next presidential election.

== Foreign relations ==
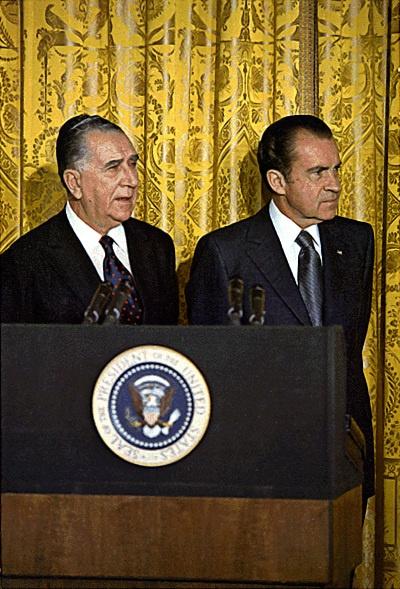
Médici with U.S. president Richard Nixon, December 1971

During this period Brazil's international agenda incorporated new perceptions. With nationalist military — who were state-control devotees — in power, there was increased energy for questioning the disparities of the international system. Interest in expanding state presence in the economy was accompanied by policies intended to transform Brazil's profile abroad. The relationship with the United States was still valued, but policy alignment was no longer total. Connections between Brazilian international activity and its economic interests led foreign policy, conducted by foreign minister José de Magalhães Pinto (1966–67), to be labeled "Prosperity Diplomacy".

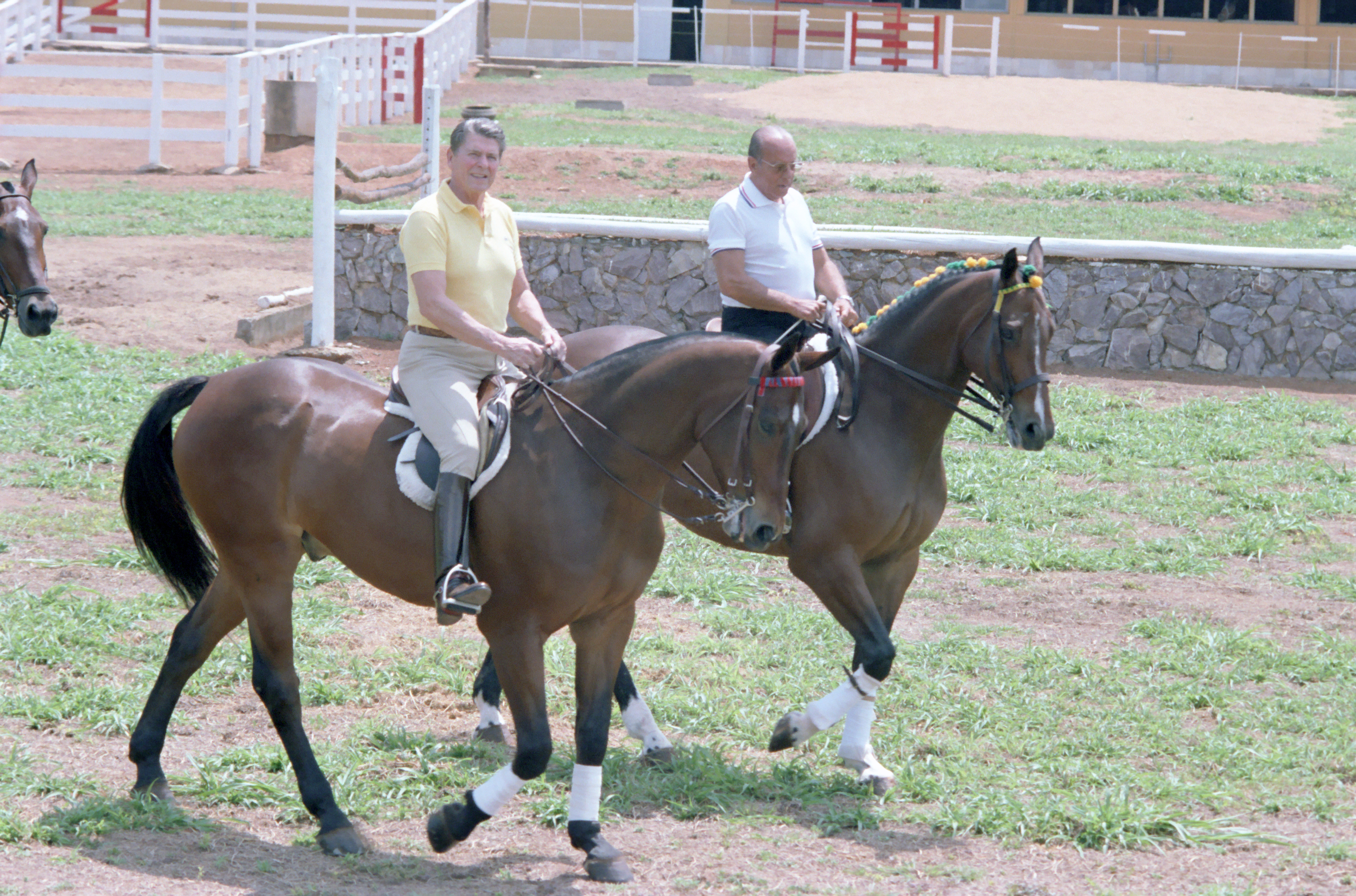
Figueiredo and Ronald Reagan riding horses in Brasília, 1 December 1982

This new emphasis of Brazil's international policy was followed by an appraisal of relations maintained with the United States in the previous years. It was observed that the attempted strengthening of ties had yielded limited benefits. A revision of the Brazilian ideological stand within the world system was added to this perception. This state of affairs was further enhanced by the momentary relaxation of the bipolar confrontation during détente.

In this context, it became possible to think of substituting the concept of limited sovereignty for full sovereignty. Development was made a priority for Brazilian diplomacy. These conceptual transformations were supported by the younger segments of Itamaraty (Ministry of External Relations), identified with the tenets of the Independent Foreign Policy adopted by country in the early 1960s.

Based on the priorities of its foreign policy, Brazil adopted new positions in various international organizations. Its performance at the II Conference of the United Nations Conference on Trade and Development (UNCTAD) in 1968, in defence of non-discriminatory and preferential treatment for underdeveloped countries' manufactured goods, was noteworthy. The same level of concern distinguished the Brazilian stand at the Economic Commission for Latin America (ECLA) meeting in Viña del Mar in 1969. On this occasion, Brazil voiced its support of a Latin American union project.

In the security sphere, disarmament was defended and the joint control system of the two superpowers condemned. Brazil was particularly critical of the Nuclear Non-Proliferation Treaty, with a view to guarantee the right to develop its own nuclear technology. This prerogative had already been defended previously, when the Brazilian government decided not to accept the validity of the Treaty for the Prohibition of Nuclear Weapons (TNP) in Latin America and the Caribbean. Brazil's position on the TNP became emblematic of the negative posture that it would, from then onwards, sustain regarding the power politics of the United States and the Soviet Union. Its initial detailing was influenced by the presence of João Augusto de Araújo Castro as ambassador to the UN and president of the Security Council in the years 1968–69. Brazil tried to strengthen its position with nuclear cooperation negotiated settlements with countries such as Israel (1966), France (1967), India (1968) and the United States (1972).

The changes in Brazilian diplomacy were to be also reflected in other matters on the international agenda, such as the moderate stance taken with regard to the "Six-Day War" between Arabs and Israelis. In the multilateral sphere, the country championed the cause of the reform of the United Nations Organization charter.

The expansion of Brazil's international agenda coincided with the administrative reform of the Ministry of External Relations. Its move to Brasília in 1971 was followed by internal modernization. New departments were created, responding to the diversification of the international agenda and the increasing importance of economic diplomacy. Examples include the creation of a trade promotion system (1973) and the Alexandre de Gusmão Foundation (1971) to develop studies and research foreign policy.

Foreign policy during the Gibson Barboza mandate (1969–74) united three basic positions. The first one, ideological, defended the existence of military governments in Latin America. To achieve that, the Organization of American States fought terrorism in the region. The second one criticized the distension process between the two superpowers, condemning the effects of American and Soviet power politics. The third requested support for development, considering that Brazil, with all its economic potential, deserved greater responsibility within the international system.

New demands and intentions appeared, related to the idea that the nation was strengthening its bargaining power in the world system. At international forums, its main demand became "collective economic security". The endeavor to lead Third World countries made Brazil value multilateral diplomacy. Efforts in this direction can be observed at the UN Conference on Environment (1972), the GATT meeting in Tokyo (1973) and the Law of the Sea Conference (1974).

This new Brazilian stance served as a base for the revival of its relationship with the United States. Differentiation from other Latin American countries was sought, to mean special treatment from the United States. Nevertheless, not only was this expectation not fulfilled but military assistance and the MEC-USAID educational cooperation agreement were interrupted.

Washington remained aloof at the time of President Médici's visit to the United States in 1971. In response, especially in the military and diplomatic spheres, nationalist ideas were kindled and raised questions about the alignment policy with the United States.

The presence of J.A. de Araújo Castro as ambassador to Washington contributed to the redefinition of relations with the U.S. government. The strategic move was to try to expand the negotiation agenda by paying special attention to the diversification of trade relations, the beginning of nuclear cooperation, and the inclusion of new international policy themes.

In 1971 the military dictatorship helped rig Uruguayan elections, which Frente Amplio, a left-wing political party, lost. The government participated in Operation Condor, which involved various Latin American security services (including Pinochet's DINA and the Argentine SIDE) in the assassination of political opponents.

During this period, Brazil began to devote more attention to less-developed countries. Technical cooperation programmes were initiated in Latin America and in Africa, accompanied in some cases by state company investment projects, in particular in the fields of energy and communication. With this pretext, an inter-ministerial system was created by Itamaraty and the Ministry of Planning, whose function was to select and coordinate international cooperation projects. To foster these innovations, in 1972 foreign minister Gibson Barboza visited Senegal, Togo, Ghana, Dahomey, Gabon, Zaïre, Nigeria, Cameroon, and Côte d'Ivoire.

But the prospect of economic interests and the establishment of cooperation programs with these countries was not followed by a revision of the Brazilian position on the colonial issue. Traditional loyalty was still with Portugal. Attempts were made to consolidate the creation of a Portuguese-Brazilian community.

== Timeline ==
- April 1964 – the coup.
- October 1965 – political parties abolished, creation of two party system.
- October 1965 – Presidential elections to be indirect.
- January 1967 – a new Constitution.
- March 1967 – Costa e Silva takes office.
- November 1967 – opposition starts armed resistance.
- March 1968 – beginning of student protests.
- December 1968 – Institutional Act Nr.5.
- September 1969 – Medici selected as president.
- October 1969 – a new Constitution.
- January 1973 – armed resistance suppressed.
- June 1973 – Medici announces Geisel as his successor.
- March 1974 – Geisel takes office.
- August 1974 – political relaxation announced.
- November 1974 - MDB wins in Senate elections.
- April 1977 – National Congress dismissed.
- October 1977 - Head of the Armed Forces dismissed.
- January 1979 - Institutional Act Nr. 5 dismissed.
- March 1979 – Figueiredo takes office.
- November 1979 – two party system of ARENA and MDB ended.
- November 1982 – opposition wins Lower house of Parliament.
- April 1984 – amendment for direct presidential elections defeated.
- March 1985 – José Sarney takes office.

== See also ==
- Reorganization of the Brazilian Armed Forces during the military dictatorship
- Corinthians Democracy
- Films depicting Latin American military dictatorships
- List of people killed by and disappeared during the Brazilian military dictatorship
- Nuclear activities in Brazil
- Volkswagen do Brasil
- Brazilian Military Criminal Code
- New Order, a military dictatorship in Indonesia with similar history
