= Edinaldo Filgueira =

- Born: c. 1975
- Died: 15 June 2011; Serra do Mel, Brazil
- Education: UERN
- Occupations: Blogger and journalist, editor and owner

Edinaldo Filgueira, also spelled Ednaldo (c. 1975 – 15 June 2011), was a Brazilian blogger and journalist and editor. He was the owner of the newspaper and online Jornal o Serrano in Serra do Mel, Brazil. He was assassinated by gunmen as he left work. Filgueira was also active in party politics. He was believed to have been killed for a blog post critical of local government.

Filgueira was the third blogger worldwide to have been known to be killed for their blog publications. The others were Iranian blogger Omid Reza Mir Sayafi, who died while in an Iranian prison in March 2009, and Bahraini Zakariya Rashid Hassan al-Ashiri, who was killed while in Bahraini custody in April 2011 during the Arab Spring uprising. Filgueira was the first blogger known to have been assassinated.

Filgueira is listed by the Freedom Forum Journalists Memorial at Newseum as a journalist who died during 2011.

== Death ==
Edinaldo Filgueira was murdered in Serra do Mel, Rio Grande do Norte, Brazil. Natal is the capital city of the state of Rio Grande do Norte, which is shown relative to the national capital.

Edinaldo Filgueira, 36, was leaving his office at the Jornal o Serrano in Serra do Mel, Brazil on 15 June when he was gunned down by three men on motorcycles. Filgueira was shot six times and died at the scene. While the Jornal o Serrano had previously been published from 2005 to 2009, it had only been restarted and in operation for a month and a half before Filgueira was assassinated. The gunmen were later arrested on July 2 and 3 and the Federal Police said those arrested are believed to be a part of gang of contract killers for hire. Filgueira was not only the founder and editor of the Jornal o Serrano but a blogger and politician as well. Filgueira was also the regional director of the ruling Workers' Party (Brazil) in Serra de Mel.

In a blog post just days before his murder, Filgueira posted an opinion poll and an investigative report on the local govenrnment's finances. He received death threats in response to the blog a couple days before the murder. Police believe the publication had something to do with Filgueira's murder. His sister, Gilvaneide Filgueira, who also worked at the Jornal o Serrano, told authorities her brother had been threatened.

All five suspects were arrested by 3 July 2011 with the Federal Police and the Ministry of Public Security of Rio Grande do Norte working together on the operation, which also linked the suspects to at least one earlier crime. Also suspected in the murder of Jailton Galdino da Silva on 6 April, police arrested them in Natal, Mossley, and Serra do Mel and confiscated 8 guns, 4 rifles and ammunition.

== Jornal o Serrano ==
The newspaper Jornal o Serrano began publication 12 March 2005 and continued until May 2009. It then restarted in May 2011 in both print and online formats. In addition, owner Filgueira had a blog. The mission of the newspaper was to report on the "political and community issues" of Serra do Mel and the surrounding region. In an editorial written by Filgueira one and a half months before his assassination, he wrote about the newspaper: "It is the newspaper of record and over the years has been known to be open to the public and a newspaper that has a lot of courage to tackle controversial issues.

== Context ==
Organized crime in Brazil has been active for several years now. The most activity of organized crime takes place in the two largest cities in Brazil, which are São Paulo and Rio de Janeiro. The organized crime consists of illegal arms dealing and drug trafficking. Government officials are said to be involved with these illegal acts as well. In 2006, 74 city police officers in Rio de Janeiro were arrested for involvement in these same crimes of illegal arms dealing and drug trafficking. In 2007, 40 people were arrested including judges, lawyers, and police officers for being involved in these crimes as well. People have been killed for disagreeing with local gangs. The gangs have even gotten prisons to riot in 70 different prisons across Brazil. This illustrates just how powerful gangs and organized crime is in Brazil. The gang situation had also made Brazil dangerous for journalists like Edinaldo Filgueira.

== Impact ==
Reporters Without Borders said, "Covering organized crime exposes Brazilian journalists to serious threats."

There were two other murders in the same region of Brazil, as well as an attempted murder. Ricardo Gama, who was another blogger, criticized politicians and police authorities. He was shot three times, once in the head, neck and shoulder 24 March in Rio de Janeiro, and he survived. Luciano Leitao Pedrosa, another journalist was shot and killed in a restaurant on 9 April 2011 in Rio de Janeiro. He was outspoken on municipal finances. Valerio Nascimento from the same area was shot and killed in his own home on May 3, 2011. Nascimento was an owner and editor of a newspaper, and he was involved in local politics.

== Reactions ==
According to Proyecto Impunidad, the Federal Police in Brazil said, "To be responsible for killing a professional journalist harms one of the main pillars of a democratic state, which is the freedom of the press." The Federal Police were investigating other incidents of murdered journalists.

The Inter-American Commission on Human Rights condemned the murder of Filgueira but also noted that in his case the Brazilian authorities had investigated and arrested five and said that putting an end to impunity would help prevent future killings of journalists.

Eraldo Paiva, the president of the political party Workers' Party, or Partido dos Trabalhadores in Portuguese, and the same party that Filgueira belonged, said that the crime was against a person but also a political crime and a crime against the press and free speech.

== See also ==
- Human rights in Brazil
- Décio Sá
- Marcos de Barros Leopoldo Guerra
- Evany José Metzker
- Ítalo Eduardo Diniz Barros
