= Ítalo Eduardo Diniz Barros =

Brazilian press officer

- Born: ca. 1985
- Died: November 13, 2015; Governador Nunes Freire, Maranhao, Brazil
- Cause of death: Shot
- Body discovered: 181 km. from Sao Luis
- Occupation: Blogger/press officer
- Employer: Mayor Marcel Curio
- Known for: His political accusations
- Spouse: Elida Moreaes
- Parent: Maria de Fatima Diniz Barros
- Website: italodiniz.com

Ítalo Eduardo Diniz Barros, (ca. 1985 – November 13, 2015), a Brazilian press officer who was employed by Mayor Marcel Curio in Governador Nunes Freire, Oeste Maranhense, Maranhão state, Northeast Region, Brazil, was known for blogging on his own website, Italodiniz.com, about local politicians and their alleged wrongdoings.

== Personal ==
Ítalo Eduardo Diniz Barros was born around 1985, which made him 30 years old when murdered. He was son of Maria de Fatima Diniz Barros and he was married to Elida Moraes.

== Career ==
Ítalo Eduardo Diniz Barros was employed as a press officer for Mayor Marcel Curio of Governador Nunes Freire, Maranhão.

Diniz Barros first started his blog, Italiodiniz.com, in 2011 as a political outlet for him to defend rights and the public's right to know. On his blog, Diniz Barros published interviews with public officials, as well as accusations against them, and he allowed comments from readers about those posts. He also supplemented these posts with news on local accidents and upcoming events.

== Death ==
Governador Nunes Freire is located within Brazil and shown relative to the largest city São Paulo and the capital city Brasília.

Ítalo Eduardo Diniz Barros, 30, was killed on Friday, November 13, 2015, by four gunshot wounds fired by two different suspects. According to military police, Diniz Barros had been threatened before the shooting and a friend said the threats had already started in 2012. The shooting took place on Rua do Evangelho in the city of Governador Nunes Freire. Diniz Barros and his friend Werbeth Matheus Castro, another blogger, were walking on the sidewalk heading into the neighborhood around 6:45 p.m when two unidentified suspects on motorcycles approached them and started firing. Diniz Barros died shortly after arriving to the hospital. His friend, Werbeth, who was shot three times survived. Investigations began shortly after the next morning from PM-MA and civilian police teams as they tried to obtain the security footage from local cameras near the crime, but all three cameras were off at the time.

== Context ==
A few days prior to his death, Diniz Barros made posts about policies that had been adopted by local leaders, which included quotes from former health secretary and governor.

Prior to his death, Ítalo Eduardo Diniz Barros mentioned that he received threats from several different sources, including politicians and security guards. These threats were assumed to be a response to the content on his blog. Diniz Barros had also received one death threat, which he told his co-workers about on a WhatsApp group made for bloggers. Diniz Barros filed reports on those threats. William Sousa Filho, head of the homicide department, did not confirm whether Diniz Barros' killing was politically motivated.

== Impact ==
There have been over 30 journalists killed in Brazil since 1992 and 22 of those journalists were killed since 2004, but the majority of them have not been fully resolved.

Italo Eduardo Diniz Barros was one of six bloggers and journalists killed in 2015 in Brazil as a result of their reporting and he was the second in less than a week. Around this time, ten more people were arrested by Brazilian police officers on suspicion of terrorism related to the upcoming Brazilian hosted Olympics. Four days before Diniz Barros' killing, Israel Silva, a radio reporter, was murdered for talking about alleged corruption on his radio program which featured interviews from local officials about controversial topics. Brazil is ranked 11th among nations for having 11 unsolved cases for blogger and journalist just like the case of Diniz Barros. Although there has been occasional convictions, the majority of the suspects have avoided prosecution. In 2015, 12 journalists were murdered across Latin America.

== Reactions ==
Irina Bokova, director-general of UNESCO, said, "I call on the authorities to investigate this crime and bring its perpetrators swiftly to justice. Freedom of expression is a basic human right and we must do everything to enhance the safety of journalists."

A spokesperson for PEN International said, "We understand that ongoing police investigations into these most recent killings are taking the victims’ writing into consideration as a possible motive for the crimes. We hope that this is indeed the case so that any link to freedom of expression can be established. However, even if writing is provocative, the response to it should never be violent, and those responsible for the murders must be identified and prosecuted."

A spokesperson for the Committee to Protect Journalists said, "Journalists in Brazil must be able to report the news without fear of reprisal. Instead, deadly violence is silencing critical voices and seriously limiting the ability of Brazilians to engage in vigorous discussion on issues of public interest."

== See also ==
- Human rights in Brazil
- Edinaldo Filgueira
- Décio Sá
- Marcos de Barros Leopoldo Guerra
- Evany José Metzker
- Orislandio Timóteo Araújo
