= Gleydson Carvalho =

Brazilian journalist

- Born: April 5, 1979; Ceará, Brazil
- Died: August 7, 2015 (aged 36); Camocim, Ceará, Brazil
- Cause of death: Gunshot wounds
- Occupation: Radio journalist
- Employer: Radio Liberdade FM
- Known for: Radio talk show host

Gleydson Cardoso de Carvalho (5 April 1979 – 7 August 2015) was a Brazilian radio talk show host and journalist for Radio Liberdade FM. He was known for his attacks on local government corruption. Carvalho was killed after being shot in the head and chest multiple times while on air by unidentified gunmen.

== Career ==
Carvalho began his career as a radio DJ in 1999, when he became the host of a local community channel. From 2002 to 2011, Carvalho was employmed by Sistema Jangadeiro. He was a creative director and news announcer for Acaraú FM Radio and presented the daily news on Progresso AM Radio.

Carvalho came into prominence for frequently speaking out against political corruption during airtime. Carvalho was well known for his long-standing campaign against government corruption. Gleydson worked in Russas, Caririaçu, and Camocim.

During his school days, Gleydson studied, in Caucaia-Ce, at EEM Eliezer de Freitas Guimarães, was President of the Student Union (GEEF-Grêmio Estudantil Eliezer de Freitas).

Gleydson Carvalho was a radio talk show host for Radio Liberdade FM. Carvalho was known for professing his strong political views while hosting his show and had received many death threats on his Facebook page. His career was made by the amount of political views and opinions he put into his show. Gleydson Carvalho was so popular he had his own show at lunchtime.

== Death ==
Camocim is located within Brazil and shown relative to the capital city Brasília.

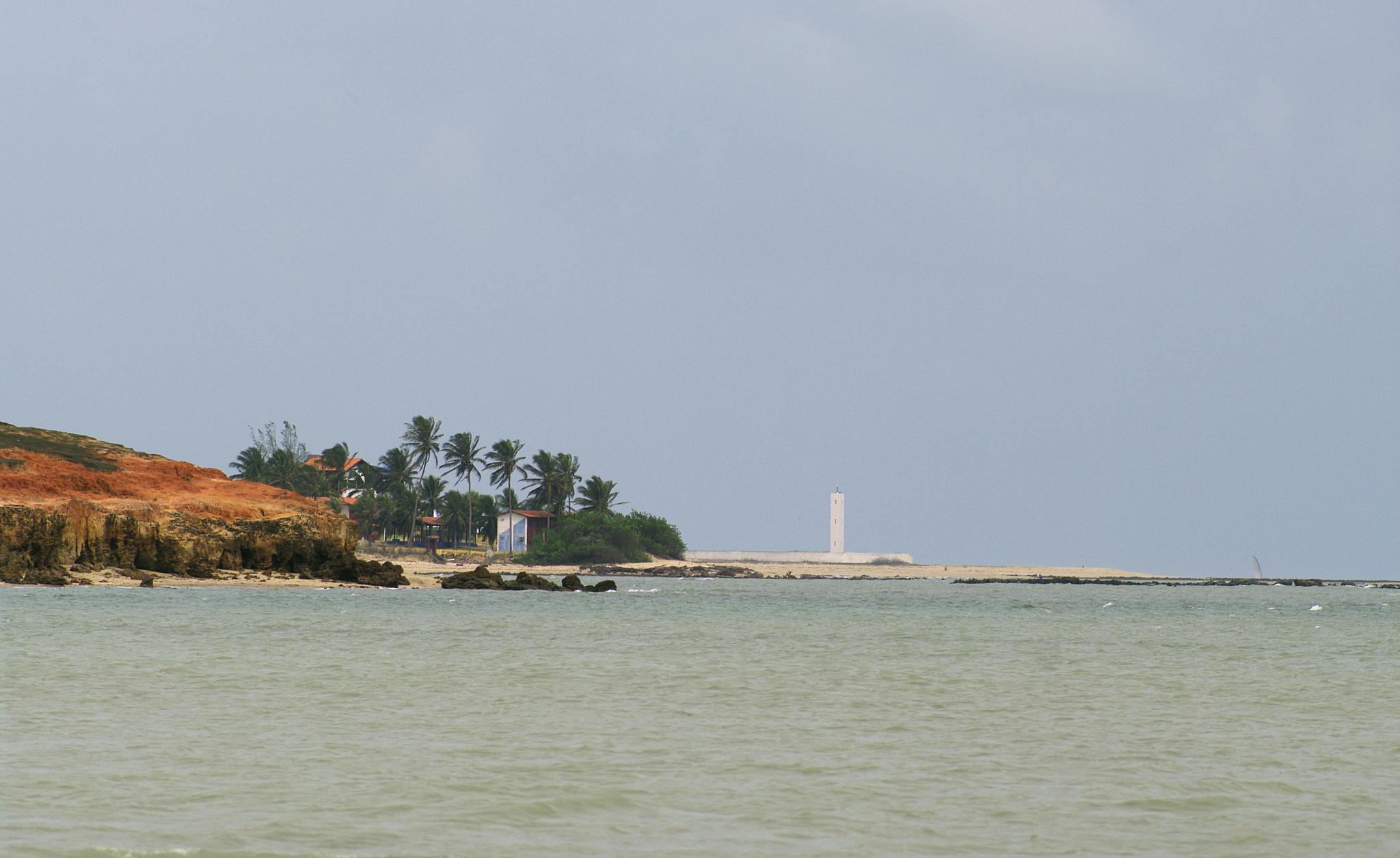
This picture is taken outside of Camocim. Camocim is where Carvalho was shot and killed.

On August 7, 2015, Carvalho was assassinated during a musical interlude as he was hosting a live broadcast at the Radio Liberdade FM in the Brazilian state of Ceará. According to the media, two men entered the station's offices during his midday segment and stated that they would like to place an ad. Shortly after, they overpowered the receptionist before gaining entry to Carvalho's recording studio, and once inside, the gunmen shot Carvalho five times (3 times in the head and twice in the chest). Carvalho died as he was taken to a nearby hospital. The killers fled on a white motorbike.

=== Arrests and convictions ===
Security footage from August 4, three days prior to the shooting, showed the perpetrators, who were believed to still be at large, identified as Thiago Lemos da Silva, 22, and Israel Marques Carneiro, 31, also known by the nicknames "Jefferson", "Dudu", and "Baixinho", loitering in front of the radio station. Civil Police have put up a warrant for their arrest and considered Lemos and Marques prime suspects in the killing.

On August 8, two suspects were taken into custody in connection of the killing, Francisco Antônio Carneiro Portela, 23, and Gisele de Sousa do Nascmiento, 18, who were accused of housing the gunmen after the shooting in exchange for 9,000 real, based on matching clothes and weapons found at their residence in Senador Sá. A third individual, Daniel Lennon Almada da Silva, 21, was detained in Martinópole after he was identified as the owner of motorcycle used as the getaway vehicle. Lennon was the cousin of Martinóple's incumbent mayor, James Martins Pereira Barros a.k.a. James Bell of the Brazilian Democratic Movement, who was frequently accused of corruption by Gleydson Carvalho. In September of the same year, Lemos was arrested along with his wife, Regina Rocha Lopes, 19, the latter of whom was accused of collaborating in planning the murder. Lemos admitted to taking part in the murder, but denied shooting Carvalho. In December, Francisco Pereira da Silva, uncle of both Thiago Lemos da Silva and James Bell, was also taken into custody on suspicion of financing the murder. His brother João Batista Pereira da Silva, an uncle to James Bell, was determined to be the instigating force behind the murder, but could not be located. On April 10, 2019, Lemos, Nascimento, and Lopes were convicted of qualified homicide and participation in a criminal organization, with Lemos sentenced a 27 years of imprisonment, while Nascimento and Lopes received a 23-year sentence each. As of August 2019, João Batista Pereira da Silva and Israel Marques Caneiro were listed as fugitives from justice and still wanted for their roles in the murder. Charges against Carneiro Portela or Lennon were not specified. James Bell denied any knowledge of the murder in a 2016 interview and was not criminally investigated.

== Context ==
Gleydson Carvalho was the fourth journalist killed in Brazil in 2015. On March 5, 2015, Gerardo Ceferino Servian Coronel, also a radio journalist, had previously been fatally shot and his body dumped close to Ponta Porã, near the Brazil-Paraguay border. Internet journalist Evany José Metzker was found decapitated in Padre Paraíso, Minas Gerais on May 18, 2015. On May 22, another radio journalist, Djalma Santos da Conceição, was abducted from Governador Mangabeira and found dead with signs of torture the next day in Timbó, outside of Conceição da Feira, Bahia. All four murders remain unresolved. Committee to Protect Journalists reports that at least 16 journalists have been killed in the country since 2011, ranking Brazil eleventh on the CPJ's 2014 Global Impunity Index.

== Impact ==
Gleydson Carvalho was well known for his long-standing, vocal reporting about government corruption. Carvalho's death sparked outrage and caused an uproar in the local community. Human rights groups in Brazil were outside of major urban centers around the country. Without Carvalho's knowing, he got these groups to fight for the journalists' lives that had been taken from them because of their jobs.

== Reactions ==
Irina Bokova, the director-general of UNESCO, said, "Journalists are the voices of the people and when violence is used to silence one of them, society as a whole suffers. I call on the authorities to investigate this crime and bring its perpetrators to court to be punished in keeping with Brazil's legal provisions."

A statement from Committee to Protect Journalists said, "Authorities must take action to combat a press freedom crisis that is violating the right of all Brazilians to be informed, not to mention ending journalists' lives."
