= Ahmed Hassan =

Ahmed Hassan or Ahmad Hassan (Arabic: أحمد حسن) may refer to:

== Ahmad Hassan ==
- Ahmad Hassan (Malaysian politician) (born 1960), Member of Parliament for Papar
- Ahmad Hassan (Syrian politician) (born 1947), Syrian diplomat and information minister
- Ahmed Hassan (terrorist), (born c. 1999), perpetrator of Parsons Green train bombing
- Ahmad R. Hassan, an Egyptian American perennial candidate.

== Ahmad al-Hassan ==
- Ahmad al-Hassan (born 1968), leader of the Shia Iraqi movement Ansar of Imam al-Mahdi
- Ahmad Y. al-Hassan (1925–2012), Palestinian/Syrian/Canadian historian
- Ahmed Al-Hassan, Palestinian former football manager

== Ahmed Hassan ==
- Ahmed Hassan (boxer) (born 1941), Egyptian Olympic boxer
- Ahmed Hassan (cricketer) (born 1995), Italian cricketer of Pakistani descent
- Ahmed Hassan (footballer, born 1975), Egyptian football midfielder
- Ahmed Hassan (footballer, born 1993), Egyptian football striker
- Ahmed Hassan (politician), Pakistani Senate politician
- Ahmed Ismail Hassan (1990s–2012), Bahraini citizen journalist and videographer
- Ahmed Issack Hassan (born 1970), Kenyan lawyer and politician
- Ahmed M. Hassan, Somali American businessman and politician
- Ahmed Mohamed Hassan (born 1945), Djiboutian politician
- Ahmed Mohamed Hassan (pilot) (born 1953), Somali Air Force pilot
- Ahmed Osman Hassan, Somali politician
- Ahmed Salem Hassan, Egyptian cyclist at the 1924 Summer Olympics

== Part of the name: Given and middle name ==
- Ahmad Hassan Abdullah (born 1981), long-distance and cross country runner who at first represented Kenya but then switched to Qatar
- Ahmed Hassan al-Bakr (1914–1982), president of Iraq from 1968 to 1979
- Ahmed Hassan Barata (born 1960), Nigerian politician
- Ahmed Hassan Farag (born 1982), Egyptian football striker
- Ahmed Hassan Mahmoud, Egyptian paralympic athlete
- Ahmed Hassan Mekky (born 1987), Egyptian football striker
- Ahmed Hassan Musa (died 1979), Chadian insurgent
- Ahmed Hassan Said (born 1961), Egyptian businessman and first chairman of the Free Egyptians Party
- Ahmed Hassan Taleb (born 1980), Bahraini football midfielder

== See also ==
- Ahmad Hasan, village in Iran
