= Marcos de Barros Leopoldo Guerra =

Brazilian journalist (1963–2014)

- Born: ca. 1963
- Died: December 23, 2014 (Age 51); Ubatuba, São Paulo, Brazil
- Cause of death: Shot in the head, back, and abdomen.
- Body discovered: In Guerra's home, by his father.
- Occupation: Journalist
- Years active: 3
- Employer: Ubatuba Cobra
- Known for: Denouncing corrupt politicians on his blog Ubatuba Cobra

Marcos de Barros Leopoldo Guerra (ca. 1963 – December 23, 2014), was a Brazilian blogger known for his blog Ubatuba Cobra, located in Ubatuba, Brazil. Guerra was known for his denunciation of corrupt politicians in Ubatuba and nearby São Paulo. He died after being shot by two men in his home in Ubatuba. Guerra had been receiving death threats in response to the political content of his blog prior to his murder.

== Personal ==
Guerra, 51 years old at the time of his murder, was born around 1963. He resided at Rua Santa Genoveva in the Praia do Tenório (Translated: Tenório Beach) neighborhood of Ubatuba, Brazil. He was single and lived with his 85-year-old father, who discovered his son's dead body. His funeral was on December 24, 2014.

== Career ==
Guerra was a lawyer and journalist known for his blog, Ubatuba Cobra. He used his blog to investigate and criticize the corrupt actions of politicians in his home city of Ubatuba as well as nearby São Paulo. His posts on the misappropriation of funds by local administrators received negative attention which culminated in death threats being sent to Guerra.

== Death ==
Marcos de Barros Leopoldo Guerra was murdered in Ubatuba, Brazil.

According to his father, Guerra received a series of death threats relating to the political content of his blog. Guerra was killed in his home not long after. His neighbors reported that two men shot Guerra from outside of the house, through the window to his kitchen, where he was standing. Guerra suffered three wounds in the head, back, and torso and died where he stood. His father, who had been in another room of the house, heard the shots and the sound of a motorcycle driving away.

== Context ==
One of Guerra's final blog posts indicated that the Munincipal Tourism Council of Ubatuba had not been performing proper bookkeeping.

== Impact ==
Despite the passing of the "Marco Municipal da Internet" earlier in 2014, which legally guaranteed freedom of expression and consumption for Internet users in Brazil, Guerra was just one of three Brazilian journalists to be killed in retaliation for their work in 2014. Camera-man Santiago Ildio Andrade and Pedro Palma, owner of the weekly Surroundings Regional newspaper were both murdered in February of that year. Violence against journalists continued in 2015 with the deaths of Gleydson Carvalo, Evany José Metzker, and Djalma Santo da Conceição, who were each also shot and killed in the Brazilian state of Maranhão.

== Reactions ==
I condemn the murder of Marcos de Barros Leopoldo Guerra and I trust that the Brazilian authorities will conduct a thorough investigation into this killing. Attacks on journalists pose a grave threat to freedom of expression and freedom of information. Such crimes cannot be allowed to go unpunished.

— Irina Bokova, Director General UNESCO

The Office of the Special Rapporteur for Freedom of Expression of the Inter-American Commission on Human Rights (IACHR) condemns the murder of journalist and blogger Marcos de Barros Leopoldo Guerra, which took place in the city of Ubatuba, state of São Paulo, Brazil. The Office of the Special Rapporteur expresses its deep concern and urges the Brazilian authorities to act urgently to establish the motive of this crime and to investigate, prosecute and punish the perpetrators and masterminds responsible for this murder. . .The Office of the Special Rapporteur considers it essential for the State to clarify the motive for this crime; identify, prosecute, and punish those responsible; and adopt fair measures of reparation for the victim's family. The Office of the Special Rapporteur insists that the State needs to create special investigative bodies and protocols, as well as guarantee the effective inclusion of those who are being threatened because of their work in journalism in protection mechanisms designed to ensure their safety.

— The Special Rapporteur for Freedom of Expression from Inter-American Commission on Human Rights

== See also ==
- Human rights in Brazil
- Edinaldo Filgueira
- Décio Sá
- Evany José Metzker
- Orislandio Timóteo Araújo
- Ítalo Eduardo Diniz Barros
