= Evany José Metzker =

Brazilian journalist (died 2015)

- Born: 1948
- Died: May 13 or 14, 2015 (aged 67)
- Cause of death: Decapitation
- Body discovered: Padre Paraíso, Brazil
- Occupation: Journalist
- Spouse: Hilma Chaves Silva Borges

Evany José Metzker (1948 – May 13 or 14, 2015) was a Brazilian journalist who in 2015 was found decapitated in Minas Gerais, Brazil. His blog, Coruja do Vale ("The Owl of the Valley") often reported on corrupt Brazilian officials and politicians. At the time of his death, Metzker was investigating a child trafficking ring.

Evany José Metzker was murdered in Padre Paraíso, Brazil shown here relative to the largest city São Paulo and the capital city Brasília.

== Death ==
Metzker had been working on a series of stories in the Jequitinhonha Valley, one of Brazil's poorest regions, when he was killed. After his body was found, investigators determined that he had been tortured, scalped, and then beheaded. Records show that Metzker had been investigating political corruption, child prostitution, and drug dealing. He was missing for five days before police found his body. His family said the police had received an anonymous tip as to where they could find his remains which were subsequently found near Padre Paraíso in Minas Gerais.

== Context ==
At least fourteen journalists have been killed since 2011 in retaliation for their work. Brazil is the third most dangerous country for journalists in Latin America after Mexico and Colombia. Other journalists were killed around the same time as Metzker, including Gerardo Servian Coronel, a Paraguayan journalist who was shot and killed in Ponta Porã on March 4, 2015, and Gleydson Carvalho, a Brazilian radio host and journalist who was shot at point-blank range in his studio in Camocim on August 7, 2015.

== Reactions ==
UNESCO and Reporters Without Borders, an international NGO, released official statements in response to the murder, as did the Minas Gerais Journalists Union, a regional organization.

== See also ==
- Human rights in Brazil
- Edinaldo Filgueira
- Décio Sá
- Marcos de Barros Leopoldo Guerra
- Ítalo Eduardo Diniz Barros
