= Décio Sá =

Brazilian journalist (1970–2012)

- Born: Décio Sá c. 1970
- Died: April 23, 2012; São Luis, Maranhão, Brazil
- Cause of death: Gun wounds to the head
- Occupations: Journalist and blogger
- Years active: Over 17 years
- Employer(s): O Estado do Maranhão & Blog do Décio; Folha de S. Paulo (earlier)
- Known for: Political journalism
- Spouse: Silvana Sá
- Children: 2

Décio Sá (ca. 1970 – April 23, 2012) was a Brazilian political journalist for O Estado do Maranhão and a blogger for Blog do Décio and at one time worked for Folha de S. Paulo. He was gunned down in a bar in São Luís, Maranhão, Brazil. Both the Committee to Protect Journalists and Reporters Without Borders confirmed, as well as police, that his death was related to his journalism.

== Personal ==
Décio Sá was 42 years old when he was murdered. Sá's wife was pregnant at the time and the couple had one child. He was buried in São José de Ribamar on the São Luís Island on 24 April 2012.

== Career ==
Décio Sá first worked for Folha de S. Paulo in the early 1990s. Afterward he began his 17 years career with the Brazilian newspaper O Estado do Maranhão. During that time, he initiated his own blog, Blog do Décio, with a focus on systemic injustice in Brazil. Décio was counted as one of the most influential journalists in northern Brazil.

Décio Sá was killed over stories he had recently covered about extortion for the newspaper O Estado do Maranhão. Sá also ran a blog on behind the scenes action that goes on in local politics.

== Death ==
Décio Sá was murdered in São Luís, Maranhão, Brazil. São Luís is the capital of the state of Maranhão. The city is shown relative to the national capital Brasília.

Sá was inside the seaside restaurant/bar Estrela Dalva on Litorânea Avenue in São Luís shortly before midnight 23 April 2012 when he was shot six times by a 24-year-old gunman. Sá was shot four times in the head and twice in the neck. The gun used to kill Sá was identified as an .40 caliber pistol used by police. After shooting Sá, the gunman fled on the back of a motorcycle operated by his accomplice. Sá died at the scene of the shooting.

== Investigation ==
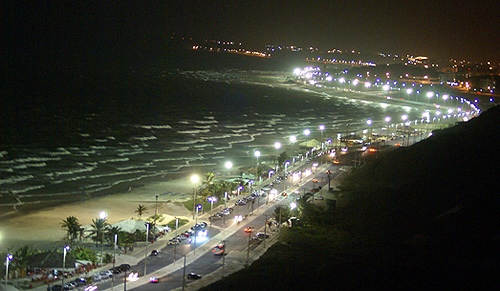
Litorânea Avenue in São Luís do Maranhão, Brazil, where Sá was murdered.

The murder was determined to be a contracted kill. The police said Sá's blog was the main reason for his murder as the suspects involved in the case were talked about in his most recent blog posts concerning loan sharks and linked murders.

A major witness to the case, Ricardo Santos Silva, a.k.a. Ricardinho and also Carioca, was shot on 3 January 2013 and died later on 13 February 2013. He was shot seven times in what was said to be an attack by organized crime. His death set the case back because he was a key witness out of the 55 who were called to testify and he had confirmed what the police investigated. However, police also believed he was involved in illegal activities.

In all seven were arrested. The gunman, Jhonatan de Sousa Silva, and motorcyclist, Marcos Bruno Oliveira, were later identified, arrested and convicted. Jhonatan de Sousa Silva received 25 years of jail time, while Oliveira received 18 for the murder of Sá. In addition, de Sousa also faced drug trafficking charges, along with 20 other murders out of a total of 49 he was suspected to have carried out in the states of Maranhão and Pará. Police identified others alleged to have been involved in the contract killing as father José de Alencar Miranda Carvalho and son Gláucio Alencar Pontes Carvalho, who were suspected of having ordered the killing, and several others who were suspected of having been the link between the orders and the hiring of the killers, including Raimundo Sales Charles Júnior, Fábio Aurélio do Lago e Silva and Airton Martins Monroe. All five suspects denied the charges and any involvement and none of them were tried or ever convicted.

== Context ==
Décio Sá was one of at least six journalists confirmed killed for their journalism in Brazil in 2012. Sá's death was considered to be part of a "...disturbing trend of killing journalists" as Brazil was experiencing an increase in this type of crime. At the time, the Committee to Protect Journalists listed Brazil as the most dangerous country for journalists in the region.

The other journalists killed in Brazil in the first part of 2012 were Laércio de Souza of Rádio Sucesso on 3 January in Camaçari, Bahia; Mario Randolfo Marques Lopes, a blogger, in Barra do Piraí on 9 February; Paulo Roberto Cardoso Rodrigues of Mercosul News in Ponta Porã, Mato Grosso do Sul, on 12 February; Onei de Moura of and Divino Aparecido Carvalho of Rádio Cultura AM in Foz do Iguaçu both in from the Paraná state and within two days of one another (24 and 26 of March); followed by Decio Sa on 23 April 2012.

== Impact ==
Both international NGOs, like the CPJ, and national press groups communicated that the environment inside Brazil was becoming increasingly dangerous for journalists. The Overseas Press Club sent a letter to the president of Brazil imploring him to pay more attention the deaths of journalists in Brazil. The Brazilian Association for Investigative Journalism also known as Abraji also asked the government to look closely into the killing of Sá. The Association also talked about how the increase of violence against journalists was something that the government should pay more attention to, before more journalists were murdered.

== Reactions ==
Irina Bokova, who is the director-general of UNESCO, made the following statement about Décio Sá: "This crime constitutes a serious attack on the basic human right of freedom of expression and its corollary, press freedom. I trust that the perpetrators of this attack will be brought to justice. Journalists must be supported in their mission to sustain informed public debate in the interest of democracy and rule of law."

Rupert Colville, spokesperson for the United Nations High Commissioner for Human Rights, said, "We condemn his murder and are concerned at what appears to be a disturbing trend of killing journalists that is damaging the exercise of freedom of expression in Brazil. We have long been concerned about the need for Brazilian human rights defenders, including journalists, to be able to conduct their work without fear of intimidation or worse. We welcome the fact that state authorities have committed to conducting a thorough investigation and we call for this and other similar cases to be treated as a major priority so that perpetrators are not emboldened by the prevailing lack of accountability."

Silvia Moscoso, editor of O Estado de Maranhão, said, "For sure he was killed because of his work as a reporter,...Over his at least 17 years at the newspaper he made a long list of enemies, many of whom I imagine would love to see him dead."

Silvana Sá said she was unaware of any death threats, never heard Sá speak of threats, yet was not surprised.

== See also ==
- Human rights in Brazil
- Edinaldo Filgueira
- Marcos de Barros Leopoldo Guerra
- Evany José Metzker
- Orislandio Timóteo Araújo
- Ítalo Eduardo Diniz Barros
