= Valério Nascimento =

- Born: Valério Nascimento; 1963; Brazil
- Died: May 3, 2011; Rio Claro, São Paulo
- Occupations: Journalist, editor and newspaper owner
- Employer: Panorama Geral

Valério Nascimento was a Brazilian owner, editor, and journalist for the Panorama Geral, which had published issues that were critical of local authorities in São Paulo state. Nascimento was shot twice in the backyard of his home on May 3, 2011, which is World Press Freedom Day. The motive is unknown, but is believed to have been politically driven.

== Personal ==
Valério Nascimento was 48 years old when he was murdered on May 3, 2011.

== Career ==
Nascimento owned the newspaper Panorama Geral and was also an editor and journalist for the paper. Panorama Geral had only published four issues before he was killed. The latest edition published articles about alleged irregularities in the mayors office. The paper also attacked the city of Bananal's public services and about how the mayor had failed to invest in public parks and health and sewage treatment centers.

=== Politics ===
Nascimento was also in charge of a local residents’ association, had been a candidate for municipal councilor in both Rio Claro and the neighbouring municipality of Angra dos Reis, and had run twice for alderman.

== Death ==
Valério Nascimento was murdered in Rio Claro, Brazil.

Nascimento was shot dead outside of his home in Rio Claro on Tuesday May 3, 2011. The gunman had shot Nascimento once in the head and once in the back. Since the Panorama Geral had recently published articles about the city of Bananal and with Nascimento's work in politics, many people and authorities believed there was a motive behind the killing. Carlos Matos, who was the officer in charge of the investigation, believed Nascimento's murder was motivated politically. On May 4, the Committee to Protect Journalists insisted that local authorities coordinate a rigorous investigation of his murder to see if it was work related. There has been no proof of any motive so far.

== Context ==
Violence against journalists was on the rise in Brazil in 2011, with two other Brazilian journalists killed and a blogger shot and wounded. In April, less than a month before Nascimento was murdered, Luciano Leitão Pedrosa, a radio and television journalist known for his critical coverage of local authorities and criminal groups, was shot in Pernambuco state. Ricardo Gama, a critical political blogger, was seriously wounded in March when he was shot in the head, neck, and chest as he walked in his Rio de Janeiro neighborhood.

CPJ's Impunity Index shows that five journalists' murders have remained unsolved over the past 10 years. Brazil returned to the index after dropping off a year ago. While Brazilian authorities have had success in prosecuting journalists' murders, winning several convictions in recent years, the country still sees persistent anti-press violence.

By the end of the year, the International News Safety Institute (INSI) and the Brazilian Association of Investigative Journalism, known as Abraji, established an organization to train journalists on security and safety.

== Reactions ==
"Brazilian authorities must thoroughly investigate Valério Nascimento's murder, determine if it was work-related, and bring those responsible to justice," said Carlos Lauría, CPJ's senior coordinator for the Americas. "We are alarmed by a series of violent attacks this year targeting journalists who report on official corruption."

“Nascimento’s murder, which took place on World Press Freedom Day, is a reminder that Brazil is still a dangerous country for journalists despite recent legislative progress and efforts to combat impunity,” Reporters Without Borders said. “He is the second journalist to have been gunned down this year while a third journalist, a blogger, only just survived a murder attempt.”

"What makes these murders even that much more tragic is that while press freedom advocates around the world united to recognise World Press Freedom Day, these hard-working journalists were being gunned down in their homelands," said IPI.

“Valério Nascinento was a journalist, newspaper owner and a politician, and his killing marks a clear attack on the right of citizens to engage in debate and political action; two essential and inter-related rights in any free democracy” the Director-General said. ‘I condemn his murder and I trust the authorities of Brazil will not let this crime - that took place as we were celebrating World Press Freedom Day - go unpunished.”

The press freedom organization added: “We pay tribute to Valério Nascimento and we urge those investigating the case to carefully examine the possibility that he was killed in connection with his work as a journalist. We also urge them to move quickly.”
