= Ahmed Ismail Hassan =

Journalist and videographer (1990 – 31 March 2012)

Ahmed Ismael Hassan al-Samadi
- Born: c. 1990; Salmabad Village, Bahrain
- Died: March 31, 2012 (Age 22); Salmabad, Bahrain
- Cause of death: Live ammunition
- Occupation: Freelance videographer
- Years active: One year
- Organization: Bahrain Centre for Human Rights
- Known for: capturing video of protests in the restricted areas of Bahrain
- Movement: Bahraini opposition

Ahmed Ismael Hassan al-Samadi, also known as Ahmed Ismail Hassan and incorrectly identified as Ahmed Ismail Abdulsamad, (1990 – 31 March 2012) was a Bahraini citizen journalist and videographer who died after covering anti-government protests of the Formula One Grand Prix in Salmabad, Bahrain, where he was shot in the thigh and later died from the gunshot wound.

While he was the first person involved in protests shot to death in over year, he was the third Bahraini journalist killed since the beginning of protests in 2011 and one of 82 journalists killed worldwide in 2012.

== Personal ==
Ahmed Ismael Hassan al-Samadi was 22 years old and he lived in Salmabad, Bahrain, which is known as a Shia village, where he was the fifth child in a family of nine. Hassan was a fan of auto racing and he had decorated his bedroom at home with pictures of race cars. He also supported the Bahraini opposition.

== Career ==
Hassan's paid job was in corporate hospitality at the Bahrain Grand Prix, but he had been active as a citizen videographer documenting and uploading on YouTube video of protests since the protests began and as early as 4 March 2011. Before his death, he had joined the Bahrain Centre for Human Rights. His hometown of Salmabad was also known as a restricted area and so his videography there was risky. He was the third journalist in Bahrain killed since the start of the protests a year earlier.

== Death ==
Ahmed Ismael Hassan was shot in Salmabad south of Manama in Bahrain. Protests have been concentrated around the Manama area.

Ahmed Ismael Hassan died on 31 March 2012 after he was shot in the right thigh while videotaping security fire tear gas at protesters south of Manama, Bahrain’s capital. He had been documenting nightly protests with his video camera. This one was in his hometown Salmabad where protesters chanted "Down with Hamad"—or the King of Bahrain Hamad bin Isa Al Khalifa. Uniformed security advanced toward peaceful protesters between 11:30 p.m and midnight. At that time, Hassan was shot in the upper right thigh. Witnesses claimed shots were fired by unidentified men who were possibly militia from about 400 meters (440 yards) away and who were in a dark Toyota Land Cruiser without license places, who were with security but not uniformed, who fired shots. After Hassan was shot, onlookers tried to help him, but he fainted from losing so much blood. They took him to a nearby house to receive first aid but the wound had hit a main blood vessel as it entered and passed through his upper leg. An hour later, Hassan arrived at the International Hospital and then was later taken to the Salmaniya Hospital, by then it was too late as he had experienced significant loss of blood, and he died at 4:30 a.m. Before he was killed, Hassan had been arrested and he was known to have been threatened by security. Friends suggested he was targeted because he told them that a member of security forces has said they were going to report him for his citizen journalism. The government denied any role and later a statement from the Interior Ministry said Hassan's autopsy was evidence that the bullet was not from Bahrain security. Hassan's murder was labeled murder by state media but remains unsolved.

== Context ==
The 2011 uprising positioned largely Shia anti-government protesters against the Sunni-led monarchy. Shia opposition demanded that the prime minister face democratic elections rather than being appointed by Bahrain's monarchy. Hassan died 14 months after protests began. Around that time, the Bahrain Centre for Human Rights had called for organized protests on behalf of its founder Abdulhadi al-Khawaja who had been arrested in April 2011 and who was hospitalized after being on a hunger strike for around 50 days.

== Impact ==
After he was killed, his family and protesters demanded the cancellation of the April 22 Grand Prix event. They argued the Formula One race because of its worldwide visibility and the government's use of the event as a sign of national unity, lent legitimacy to the Sunni-led regime as it perpetrated human rights abuses. Hassan's family led calls to cancel the race. While Bahrain's Monarchy was divided, the Crown Prince Salman bin Hamad bin Isa Al Khalifa had pushed for the event while the King was initially not for it, but in the wake of calls for, the Grand Prix continued as planned.

Muslims by custom are buried within 24 hours of death, but in Hassan's case the family disputed the death certificate and wouldn't take possession of the corpse. Later, Mohammed Ahmed Abdel Aziz, 15-year-old boy, was shot and many other were wounded by anti-riot police at Hassan's funeral.

== Reactions ==
The tragedy provoked an outpouring of anger among the majority of Shia population in Bahrain. One journalist said that everywhere she went she heard people talking about Hassan. Another Bahraini citizen journalist who had reported on the medical treatment of Hassan wounds said she was overwhelmed by the amount of blood. Working as a citizen journalist, Hassan worked independently and without assistance or support. Human rights organizations issued the following statements:

The Bahrain Centre for Human Rights said Hassan's death was part of a systematic effort to intimidate and stop photography of protests.

The Committee to Protect Journalists focused on the treatment of journalists: "This shooting underscores the terrible risks journalists face in recording the social and political unrest in Bahrain. Bahraini authorities must immediately investigate this death in a credible and timely manner."

Irina Bokova, director-general of UNESCO, said, "The basic human right of freedom of expression and the freedom of journalists and citizen journalists to cover events are essential for any society that wants to uphold the principles of democracy and rule of law. I welcome reports that the authorities’ intend to launch an inquiry into this serious event and trust that the culprits will be brought to justice." Hassan's name was one of 82 added to the Journalists Memorial at the Newseum in Washington D.C. for journalists killed in 2012.

== Books ==
Elizabeth Dickenson, Who Shot Ahmed?: A Mystery Unravels in Bahrain's Botched Arab Spring. Development and Aid World News Service (DAWNS), 2013. Ebook, 51-pages.

== See also ==
- Zakariya Rashid Hassan al-Ashiri
- Karim Fakhrawi
