= Karim Fakhrawi =

Bahraini publisher (1960s–2011)

- Born: c. 1962; Bahrain
- Died: 12 April 2011 (aged 48–49); Manama, Bahrain
- Occupations: Publisher; bookstore owner; newspaper owner
- Notable credit: Al-Wasat

Karim Fakhrawi, also known as Abdulkarim Ali Ahmed Fakhrawi (c. 1962 – 12 April 2011), was a Bahraini publisher who was the co-founder of Al-Wasat, considered one of the more popular newspapers in Bahrain by winning numerous awards. He died while in custody due to severe torture, according to the Bahrain Independent Commission of Inquiry. He was the second professional media worker to be killed during the Bahraini uprising, and one of three journalists killed in total.

== Personal ==
Fakhrawi co-founded Al-Wasat in 2002, the only independent newspaper in Bahrain, which was in the process of being banned by the Bahraini government for "trying to harm Bahrain's stability and security and disseminating false information that undermined the country's international image and reputation". He was also a member of the opposition group Al-Wefaq. Karim Fakhrawi was a Shi'ite Muslim of Persian origin (Ajam) who lived in Manama.

== Career ==
Fakhrawi was a businessman and founder of Bahrain's first educational bookstore. The bookstore had expanded into a publishing house and acted as the main supplier of books to the University of Bahrain. He owned the construction company that built the Iraqi Embassy in Bahrain. Fakhrawi was also one of the main founders of popular independent newspaper, Al-Wasat. Al-Wasat has won multiple awards, such as the UNICEF regional award for electronic media, and it is the 15th strongest MENA newspaper on the internet, according to Forbes Middle East. He was a member of Al-Wefaq, the largest opposition political party in Bahrain.

== Death ==
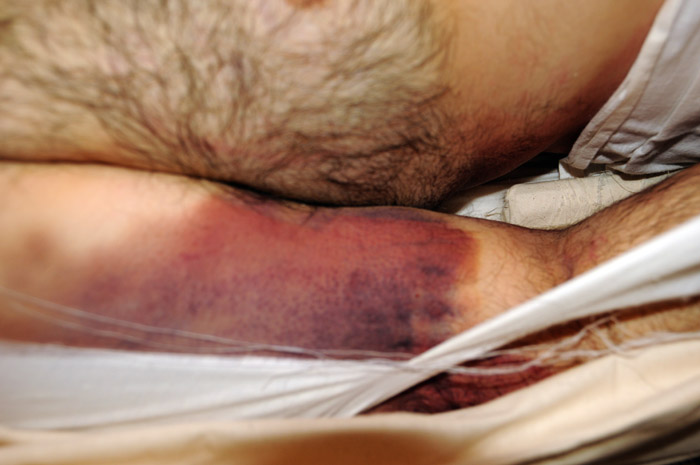
Evidence of Fakhrawi's torture was posted to the internet after his death

Fakhrawi was taken into custody on 5 April 2011 when he went to a police station to complain that police were threatening to demolish his home. He was accused of "deliberate news fabrication and falsification" by the Bahraini authorities, and the government said it would file charges against three employees as well as deport the other two. Fakhrawi was in police custody for one week before his death, and was one of many who died in the custody of the local police. Bahraini police told the media that Karim died of kidney failure, but photos later leaked revealing bruises indicating torture and police brutality. The evidence was discovered in the process of burial, when his clothes were removed and his torture marks were documented and released.

The Bahrain Independent Commission of Inquiry (BICI) stated, "The death of Abdulkarim Ali Ahmed Fakhrawi occurred at the BDF Hospital after he had been transferred from the custody of the NSA. The NSA conducted an investigation into the physical abuse of Mr Fakhrawi but not into his death. The NSA investigation resulted in the prosecution of two individuals for physical abuse. The Commission considers that the NSA failed to conduct an effective investigation into Mr Fakhrawi's death, which would satisfy the relevant obligations under international law." It goes on to say "The Commission concludes that the death of Mr Fakhrawi is attributed to torture while in the custody of the NSA."

== Context ==
In February 2011, the people of Bahrain started to protest in a wave known as the Arab Spring. The nationwide uprising in Bahrain is between the majority Shi'ite Muslims and some Sunni Muslims against the minority Sunni government. Since 15 February 2011, more than 80 anti-government protesters there had died, including four protesters that were in police custody at the time of their deaths. The anti-government political party, Al-Wefaq, has listed 453 protesters as apprehended, but a spokesperson for the group thinks the number is up towards 600 people arrested by the government.

== Impact ==
Zakariya Rashid Hassan al-Ashiri was the first to die in the uprising. Fakhrawi was the second journalist and the fourth person to die in government custody. In response to the two journalists who died, Irina Bokova, who was the director-general of UNESCO, called for an investigation looking into the death. One year later, Ahmed Ismail Hassan, who was a citizen journalist uploading videos, was shot while taking videos of a protest and died.
