= Omid Reza Mir Sayafi =

Iranian blogger and journalist

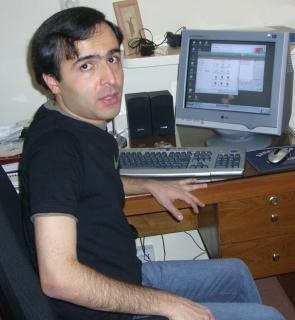
Omid Reza Mir Sayafi

Omid Reza Mir Sayafi (also Omidreza Mirsayafi; 1979/80 – March 18, 2009, in Evin Prison in Tehran) was an Iranian blogger and journalist.

Mir Sayafi was the first blogger to have died while in prison for his publication. Two other bloggers were killed afterward, and they are the Bahraini blogger Zakariya Rashid Hassan al-Ashiri, who was killed in April 2011, and Brazilian blogger Edinaldo Filgueira, who was killed June 2011.

== Career ==
Mir Sayafi's blog is no longer accessible. But in the Wayback Machine there is an archive containing the blog posts that led to his imprisonment. Mir-Sayafi's main area of expertise was traditional Persian music. He also wrote poetry and penned articles for Persian-language electronic art journals. He was apparently well known in Iranian intelligentsia circles.

== Death ==
In December 2008, Mir Sayafi was sentenced to two and half years in prison for allegedly insulting religious leaders and engaging in propaganda against the Islamic Republic of Iran. When he died, Mir Sayafi was still awaiting an additional trial for insulting Islam.

== Reactions ==
Some human rights groups that his death follows a pattern of Iranian authorities "denying urgent health care to prisoners of conscience, resulting in their death."

== Impact ==
Several citizen media groups, such as the Committee to Protect Bloggers, have announced March 18 as the day of solidarity with persecuted bloggers. The March 18 Movement was created in his memory.

== See also ==
- Human rights in Iran
