= Sonia Bonfim Vicente =

Brazilian activist (born 1985)

- Born: 1985 (age 40–41); Rio de Janeiro, Brazil
- Occupations: Hair braider Human rights activist
- Years active: 2021–present
- Known for: Activism against police brutality
- Spouse: William Vasconcellos da Silva
- Children: 2

Sonia Bonfim Vicente (born c. 1985) is a Brazilian human rights activist. A hair braider from the Chapadão favela in Rio de Janeiro, in 2021 her husband and son were shot dead by officers from the Military Police; since then, Vicente has campaigned for justice for victims of state violence and police brutality in Brazil.

== Biography ==
=== Personal life ===
Vicente was born into a poor black family. She lived in Chapadão, a favela in the North Zone of Rio de Janeiro, where she worked as a hair braider. She was married to William Vasconcellos da Silva, with whom she had a daughter, Rebecca; she also had a son, Samuel Bonfim Vicente, from a previous relationship.

In 2018, Vicente's daughter Rebecca was shot in the buttocks by a stray bullet during a shootout in Chapadão. She required surgery in order to remove the bullet. Vicente had decided not to pursue a criminal investigation due to Rebecca not receiving life-threatening injuries.

=== Killing of husband and son ===
On 25 September 2021, Vicente, her husband and son, in addition to Samuel's girlfriend, Camily da Silva Polinário, went out to celebrate Samuel being accepted into the military academy. During a meal, Polinário fell unwell after eating a hot dog, and Vicente's husband and son left to take Polinário to hospital on da Silva's motorcycle, while Vicente walked home. The three were subsequently shot by military police officers from the 41st battalion from Irajá, who had been completing a patrol of the area. All three were transported to Carlos Chagas State Hospital, where da Silva and Samuel were declared dead. A fourth person, a woman, was also taken to hospital after being grazed by a stray bullet; both she and Polinário, who had been shot, ultimately survived.

=== Investigation and response ===
The local police department in Ricardo de Albuquerque carried out the investigation into the shooting. Military police officers involved in the shooting alleged that Vicente's husband and son had been drug traffickers, and that drugs and weapons had been found on their bodies; they described the shooting as "self-defence". Vicente disputed this, stating that they had been transporting Polinário to hospital and alleging that officers had planted the items on their bodies; she also stated that da Silva's identification documents, which he had been carrying with him at the time of his death, were missing.

An independent investigation by Projeto Mirante, Fluminense Federal University's research project into cases of state violence, identified flaws in the police's investigation, in addition to gathering witness testimonies that disputed claims that Vicente's husband and son had been carrying weapons at the time of their deaths. The Order of Attorneys of Brazil's Rio de Janeiro human rights commission represented Vicente.

In 2023, Vicente led a protest outside the Ricardo de Albuquerque police station, demanding an investigation into the officers responsible for the shooting. As of June 2024, the investigation had still not transferred to the homicide division; Vicente accused officers of "stalling" in an attempt to shelve the investigation.

=== Subsequent activism ===
Since her husband and son's deaths, Vicente has campaigned for justice for people killed by police officers, as well as their families. She accumulated a dossier of evidence and studied the Brazilian legal system, sharing information with the mothers of other people killed by the police. Vicente has led demonstrations against police brutality, including one to mark what would have been her son's 21st birthday. She joined the Network for Attention to People Affected by State Violence (Portuguese: Rede de Atenção a Pessoas pela Violência do Estado), and received a scholarship from them to support with her activism. In 2024, she was among the group's members to speak before the Public Prosecutor's Office; she called for the Brazilian government to federalise cases of police brutality, citing examples including the deaths of her husband and son, as well as the victims of the 2021 Rio de Janeiro shootout. That same year, Vicente was one of 16 mothers of people killed by police who took part in the Rio Carnival.

In 2025, Vicente was among 100 women selected to assist with staff from the Federal University of Rio de Janeiro in designing a national policy of institutional support for the relatives of victims of state violence. In November, she represented the Mothers from Maré (Mães de Maré) at a demonstration of black women on the Esplanada dos Ministérios in Brasília against state violence; she held a banner with photos of 178 young people killed by the police in Rio de Janeiro. Vicente also gave a speech about the impact of daily police raids in Chapadão had on the daily functioning of the favela's residents, and also mentioned the recent killings of 121 people during Operation Containment in the favelas of Alemão and Penha.

== Recognition ==
Vicente's story was featured in "Mães de luta" (lit. 'Fighting Mothers'), a 2025 episode of the television news programme Caminhos da Reportagem. The episode was subsequently nominated for the Vladimir Herzog Award.

The British newspaper The Guardian named Vicente as one of the most inspiring people in the world in 2025.
