= Governador Nunes Freire =

Coordinates: 2.12583°S 45.885°W

- Municipality
- Flag
- Interactive map of Governador Nunes Freire
- Country: Brazil
- Region: Nordeste
- State: Maranhão
- Mesoregion: Oeste Maranhense

Population (2020)
  - Total: 25,539
- Time zone: UTC−3 (BRT)

Governador Nunes Freire is a municipality in the state of Maranhão in the Northeast region of Brazil.

== See also ==
- List of municipalities in Maranhão
