= Senador Sá =

Municipality in Ceará, Brazil

Coordinates: 3°22′S 40°27′W

- Municipality
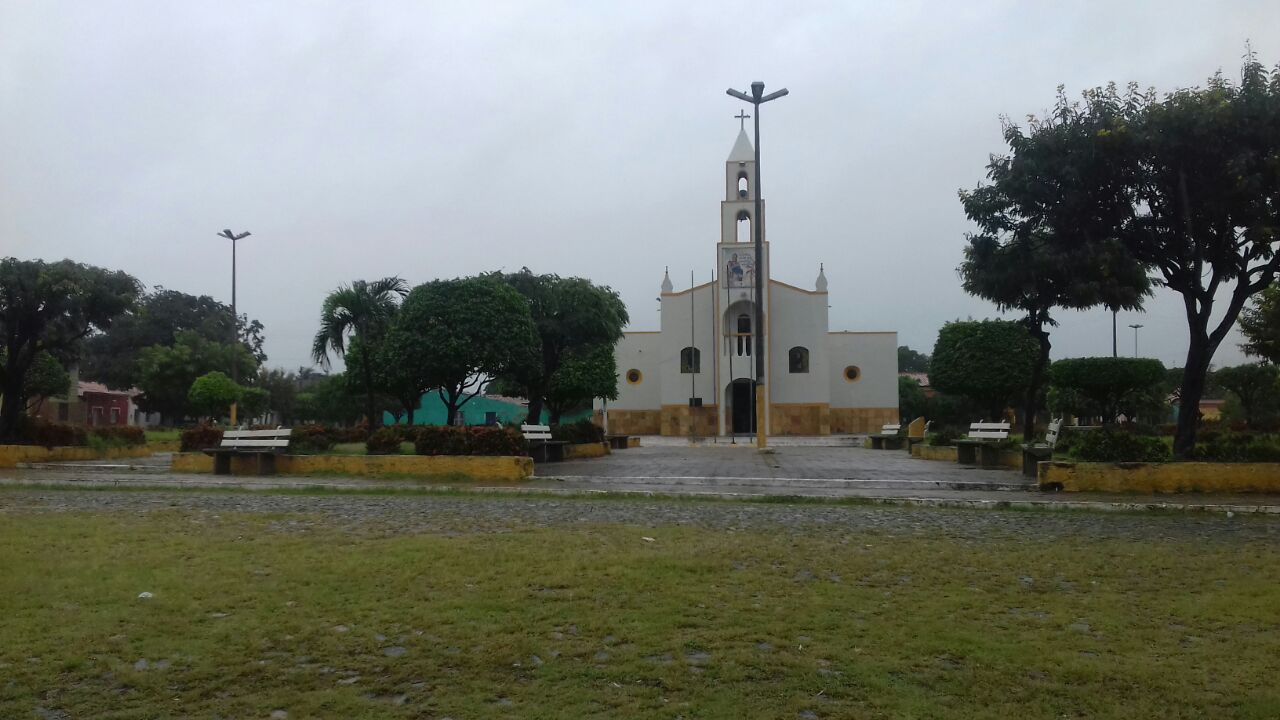

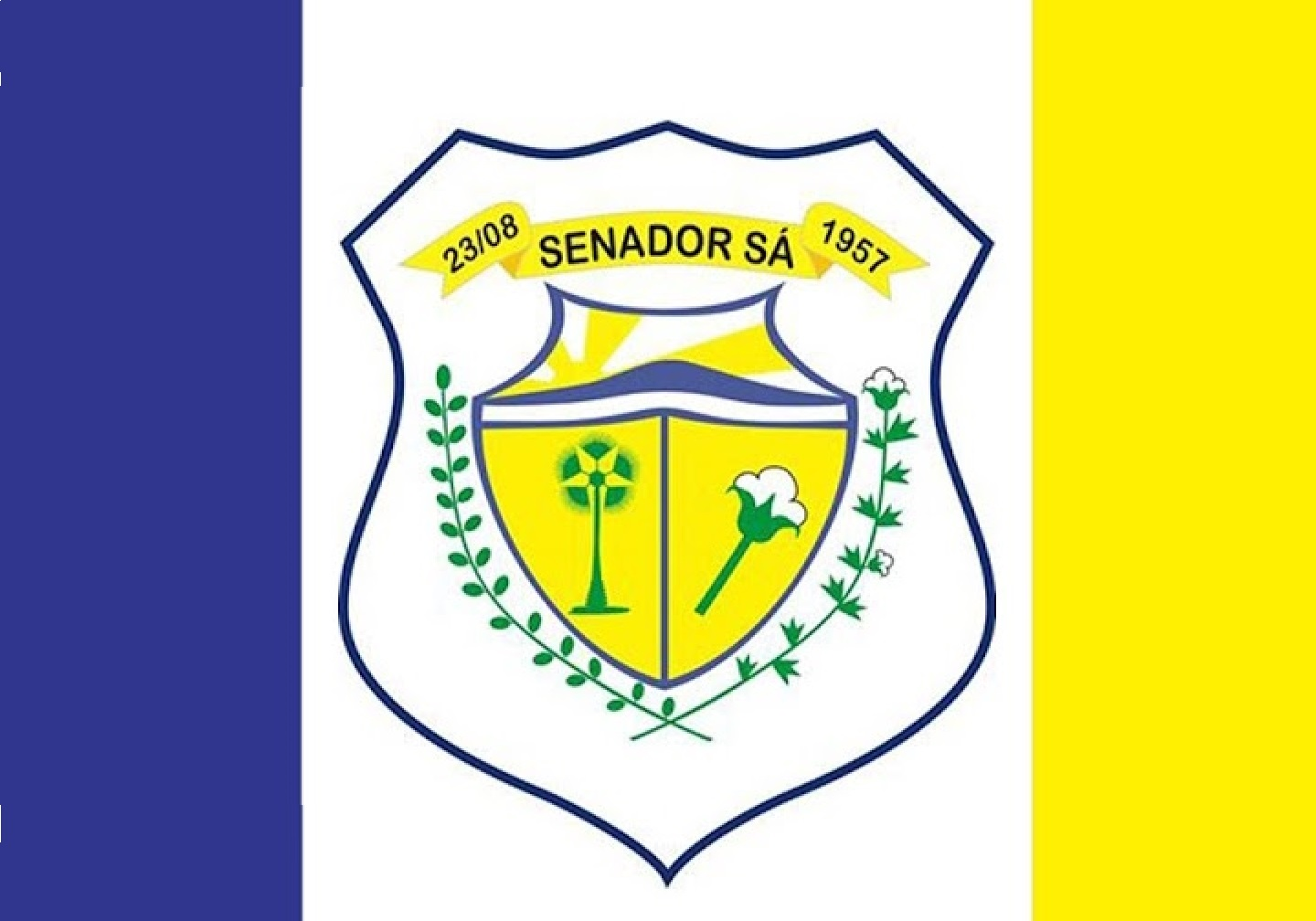
- Flag
- Interactive map of Senador Sá
- Country: Brazil
- Region: Nordeste
- State: Ceará
- Mesoregion: Noroeste Cearense

Population (2020)
  - Total: 7,691
- Time zone: UTC−3 (BRT)

Senador Sá is a municipality in the state of Ceará in the Northeast region of Brazil.

== See also ==
- List of municipalities in Ceará
