= Antonio Fernandez Saenz =

Antonio Fernandez Saenz (born 1947) is a Spanish-Brazilian lawyer and human rights defender.

== Early life ==
When he was a small child, his family emigrated from Spain to Brazil to escape the dictatorship of Francisco Franco.

== Political involvement ==
While a student, Saenz edited and contributed to several student newspapers. He was particularly active after 1964 when a military dictatorship was established that lasted until 1986.

His writing, exposing the political repression and torture in Brazil, brought him to the attention of agents of the Brazilian political police of the time, the DOI-CODI, as well as the agents of the CISA (Brazilian Air Force Intelligence Agency). In order to avoid his arrest and torture (a common practice in Brazil at that time) Saenz was forced to stop writing while the dictatorship of General Artur da Costa e Silva lasted.

== Practice of law ==
Shortly after his return from a trip to United States in 1972, he entered the Law School, graduating in 1975, and starting to practice law in the favelas (shantytowns) and impoverished neighborhoods of São Paulo and surrounding cities. People began to call him "the lawyer of the poor".

His work has continued uninterrupted for 30 years. He presently is a volunteer for several NGOs, as well as a full member of the Pastoral Commission for Human Rights of the Igreja Pentecostal e Apostólica Missao Jesus (Pentecostal Church and Apostolic Mission of Jesus).

in 2005, in a case with international repercussions, he and three other members of the Pastoral Commission were illegally arrested while denouncing abuses including torture, extortion and sexually assaulting children by the civil and military police of the State of São Paulo.

According to Amnesty International, the police did not show a search warrant and they seized documents containing statements made by local residents making serious accusations against police officers. When Saenz tried to report this incident to the civil police he was threatened and afterwards he continued to receive death threats.

The events were also reported by the US State Department in its "Country Reports on Human Rights Practices - 2005" on Brazil. The United Nations Commission on Human Rights on October 10, 2005 made a special appeal regarding Saenz and his close associates. It mentioned that Saenz had been providing legal assistance to Jardim Lavínia, Silvinha and Montanhão neighbourhoods in São Bernardo do Campo, a town south of São Paulo. He had been working with his brothers Manuel Fernando Fernandez Saenz and José Fernandez Saenz, both evangelical ministers, and Dirce Ramiro de Andrade, a journalist working for the evangelical church. Dirce de Andrade was threatened with detention and prohibited from taking any photographs at the scene. When Dirce de Andrade, Antonio Fernandez Saenz, Manuel Fernando Fernandez and José Fernandez Saenz filed a complaint with the civil police, they were reportedly charged with "disobedience" and "disrespect of authority" before being released.
