= Zakariya Rashid Hassan al-Ashiri =

Zakariya Rashid Hassan Al-Ashiri
- Born: زكريا راشد حسن العشيري; 1971; Al Dair, Muharraq, Bahrain
- Died: 9 April 2011 (aged 39–40); Al-Dair, Bahrain
- Occupations: Blogger, journalist, Internet reporter, editor

Zakariya Rashid Hassan Al-Ashiri (Arabic: زكريا راشد حسن العشيري), also spelled Al Asheri and Aushayri, (1971– April 9, 2011), was a Bahraini blogger and journalist, who worked as an editor and writer for a local blog news website in Al Dair, Bahrain. He was killed on April 9, 2011, while in custody of the Bahraini Government. Al-Ashiri was the first journalist in Bahrain to die in direct relation to his work since The Committee to Protect Journalists started keeping records in 1992, and he was the first to die in the Bahraini uprising (2011–present).

Al-Ashiri was also the second blogger-journalist worldwide to have been killed for his blogging. Al-Ashiri follows the death two years earlier of Iranian Omid Reza Mir Sayafi, who was the first blogger known to have been killed for his publication. Two months after Al-Ashiri, Brazilian blogger Edinaldo Filgueira was killed in June 2011.

== Personal ==
Zakariya Rashid Hassan Al-Ashiri was born in the village of Al-Dair in 1971, where he reported and edited his internet website.

== Career ==
Zakariya worked as an editor and blogger for the local news website which is named after his home village. He regularly reported on matters related to human rights, business, culture, and politics. The website he worked for was named Al-Dair after his home village.

== Background ==
The Bahraini uprising (2011–present), a series of protests to gain greater political freedom, began in February 2011. Protesters set up camp at the Pearl Roundabout in Manama and continued until March. After a month, the Bahraini government sent in troops and police forces from the Gulf Cooperation Council while the king of Bahrain declared martial law and a three-month state of emergency.

The protests continued for several months after. Police forces raided Shia homes, carried out beatings at checkpoints, and denied those in need of medical attention. As a result, nearly 800 people were arrested and a total of four were reported dead while in government custody.

== Death ==
Al Dair is north of the capital Manama on Muharraq Island, Bahrain.

On April 2, 2011, Al-Ashiri was arrested and charged with providing false news, inciting hatred towards the regime and calling for an overthrow of the government. On April 9, 2011, just seven days after his arrest, Al-Ashiri was reported dead while in government custody under mysterious circumstances. Authorities claim that he died of complications due to "sickle cell anemia." The Committee to Protect Journalists reported that this diagnosis was refuted by family members. Photos later surfaced of Al-Ashiri's corpse, which displayed cuts and gashes, and added further evidence that Al-Ashiri had been beaten to death. As a result, the Committee to Protect Journalists called on Bahraini authorities to conduct a thorough investigation into his death.

Similarly, another Bahraini journalist Karim Fakhrawi died on April 12, 2011, also while in detention, and officials said that he had died of kidney failure.

== Investigation ==
The Bahrain Independent Commission of Inquiry (BICI) conducted an investigation into deaths and torture claims among other civil rights abuses committed during the protests.

The Bahrain Independent Commission of Inquiry released its report 23 November 2011, and in the report, Al-Ashiri's case (no. 24) was investigated and classified under "Deaths Caused by Torture." The Commission's fact finding documents confirmed that Al-Ashiri did have bruises over his body from torture and died while at the Dry Dock Detention Centre and in custody of the Ministry of Interior. A witness who was in detention with him said Al-Ashiri was beaten and he heard a guard say, "He is dead," at which point those in the same cell were moved.

Two policemen are accused of the death beating and could be sentenced to up to seven years in prison.

== Reactions ==
In response to his death, the Newseum in Washington, D.C., added his name along with other journalists who have died while reporting to the Journalists Memorial Wall.
