= Ahmed Al-Hassan =

Palestinian football manager (born 1964)

Personal information
- Date of birth: 19 May 1964 (age 62)
- Place of birth: Jericho, Palestine

Senior career*
Years	Team	Apps	(Gls)
- Haifa SC

Managerial career
- Markaz Shabab Al-Am'ari
- Hilal Areeha
- 2015: Palestine
- * Club domestic league appearances and goals

Ahmed Al-Hassan (Arabic: احمد الحسن; born 19 May 1964) is a Palestinian former football manager.

== Life and career ==
Al-Hassan was born on 19 May 1964 in Jericho, Palestine. He is a native of Baghdad, Iraq. He played for Iraqi side Haifa SC. The club was founded by Palestinian immigrants in Iraq. In 1994, he returned to Palestine because of the creation of the State of Palestine. He lived in Ramallah, Palestine. He obtained an AFC A License. He became the first Palestinian manager to obtain an Asian Football Confederation license.

He managed Palestinian side Markaz Shabab Al-Am'ari. After that, he managed Palestinian side Hilal Areeha. In 2015, he was appointed manager of the Palestine national football team. He managed the team at the 2015 AFC Asian Cup. He was described as a "wonderful model that should be emulated and he should be honored" while managing them. He has worked as a training instructor for the Asian Football Confederation.
