= Luciano Leitão Pedrosa =

Brazilian television presenter and a radio host (1965–2011)

- Born: Luciano Leitão Pedrosa; 24 August 1965
- Died: 9 April 2011 (aged 45); Pernambuco, Brazil
- Occupations: TV presenter and radio journalist
- Employer(s): TV Vitória & Metropolitana FM
- Known for: Crime beat

Luciano Leitão Pedrosa (24 August 1965 – 9 April 2011), was a television presenter and a radio host in Brazil, who was known for his broadcasts about crime and politics. According to the Committee to Protect Journalists, the local media had reported that Pedrosa had received threats before he was killed. Police investigations at first did not follow the lead about threats as a motive but would later return to that as the motive and arrest two brothers and an accomplice who had threatened him.

Since 1992, 17 other Brazilian journalists have been killed for their reporting before Pedrosa and confirmed by the CPJ.

== Career ==
Luciano Leitão Pedrosa was a TV and radio public affairs programming host working for TV Vitória and Radio Metropolitana FM radio station. His TV show "Ação e Cidadania," which means "Action and Citizenship," aired for seven years.

== Death ==
Luciano Leitão Pedrosa was murdered in Pernambuco, Brazil, which is shown relative to the national capital.

Luciano Leitão Pedrosa was shot and killed at a restaurant in Vitoria de Santo Antao, Pernambuco on the evening of 9 April 2011. The killer shot Pedrosa in the head after firing several shots and before leaving the scene of the crime on a motorcycle operated by an accomplice. According to the Diário de Pernambuco, Pedrosa had been threatened but did not report those threats.

In all four people became the target of police investigations that had grown out of threats involving reports Pedrosa had made about drug trafficking, but one of those individuals was killed before his arrest.

== Reactions ==
Irina Bokova, director-general of UNESCO, said, "Journalists must be free to work without fear. The public debate to which they contribute lies at the heart of democratic governance. The murder of Luciano Leitão Pedrosa is a direct attack against this debate, and against the basic human right of freedom of expression."

== Personal ==
He was buried at the St. Sebastian Cemetery in Vitoria de Santo Antao.
