= Human rights in Brazil =

Human rights in Brazil include the right to life and freedom of speech; and condemnation of slavery and torture. The nation ratified the American Convention on Human Rights. The 2017 Freedom in the World report by Freedom House gives Brazil a score of "2" for both political rights and civil liberties; "1" represents the most free, and "7", the least.

However, the following human rights problems have been reported: torture of detainees and inmates by police and prison security forces; inability to protect witnesses involved in criminal cases; harsh conditions; prolonged pretrial detention and inordinate delays of trials; reluctance to prosecute as well as inefficiency in prosecuting government officials for corruption; violence and discrimination against women; violence against children, including sexual abuse; human trafficking; police brutality; discrimination against black and indigenous people; failure to enforce labour laws; and child labour in the informal sector. Human rights violators often enjoy impunity. According to UNESCO, "Brazil promotes a vast array of actions for the advancement and defense of human rights, even though it faces enormous social and economic inequalities".

== Slave labor and labor exploitation ==
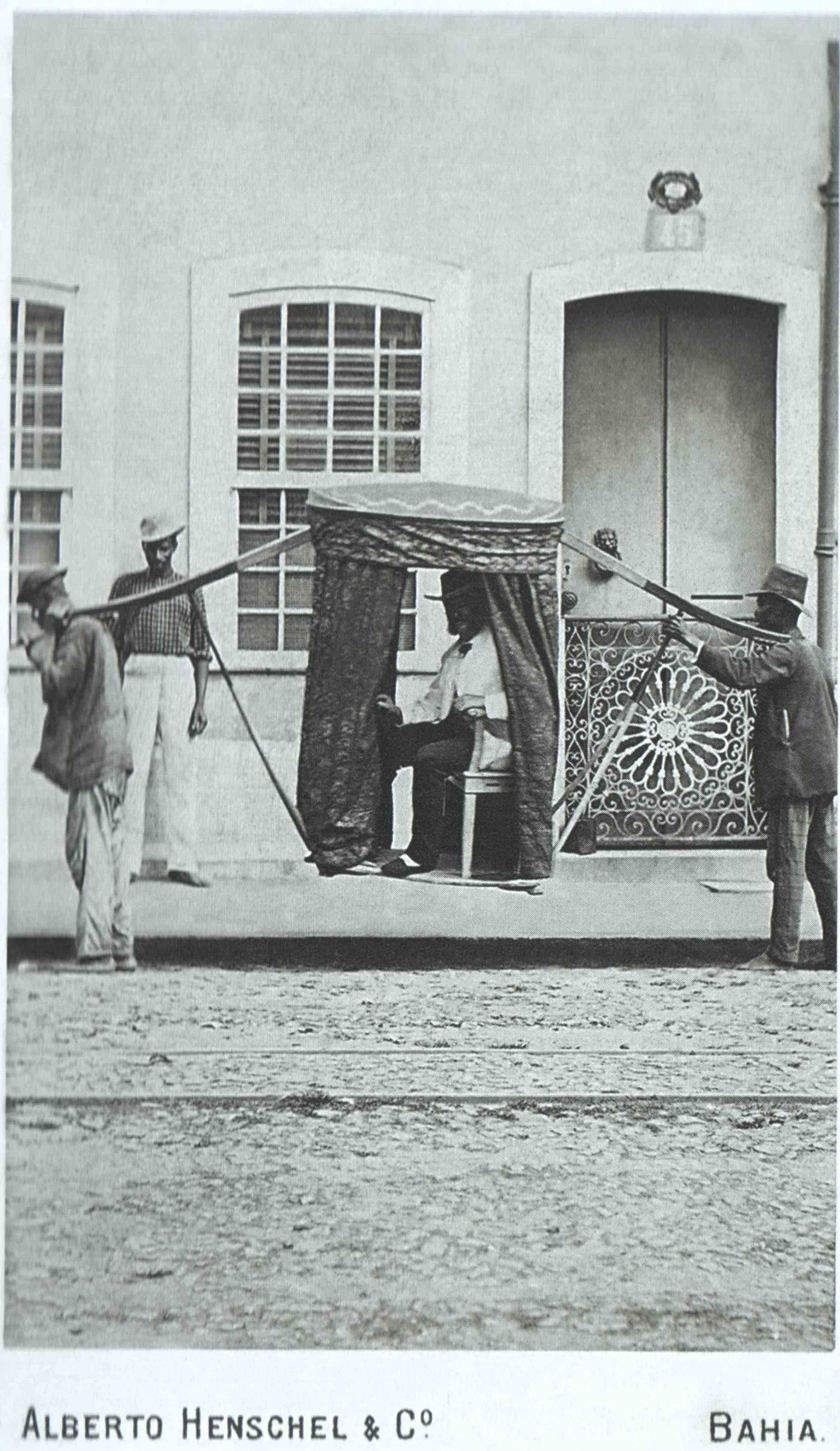
African slaves carrying a White Brazilian man in Salvador, 1869.

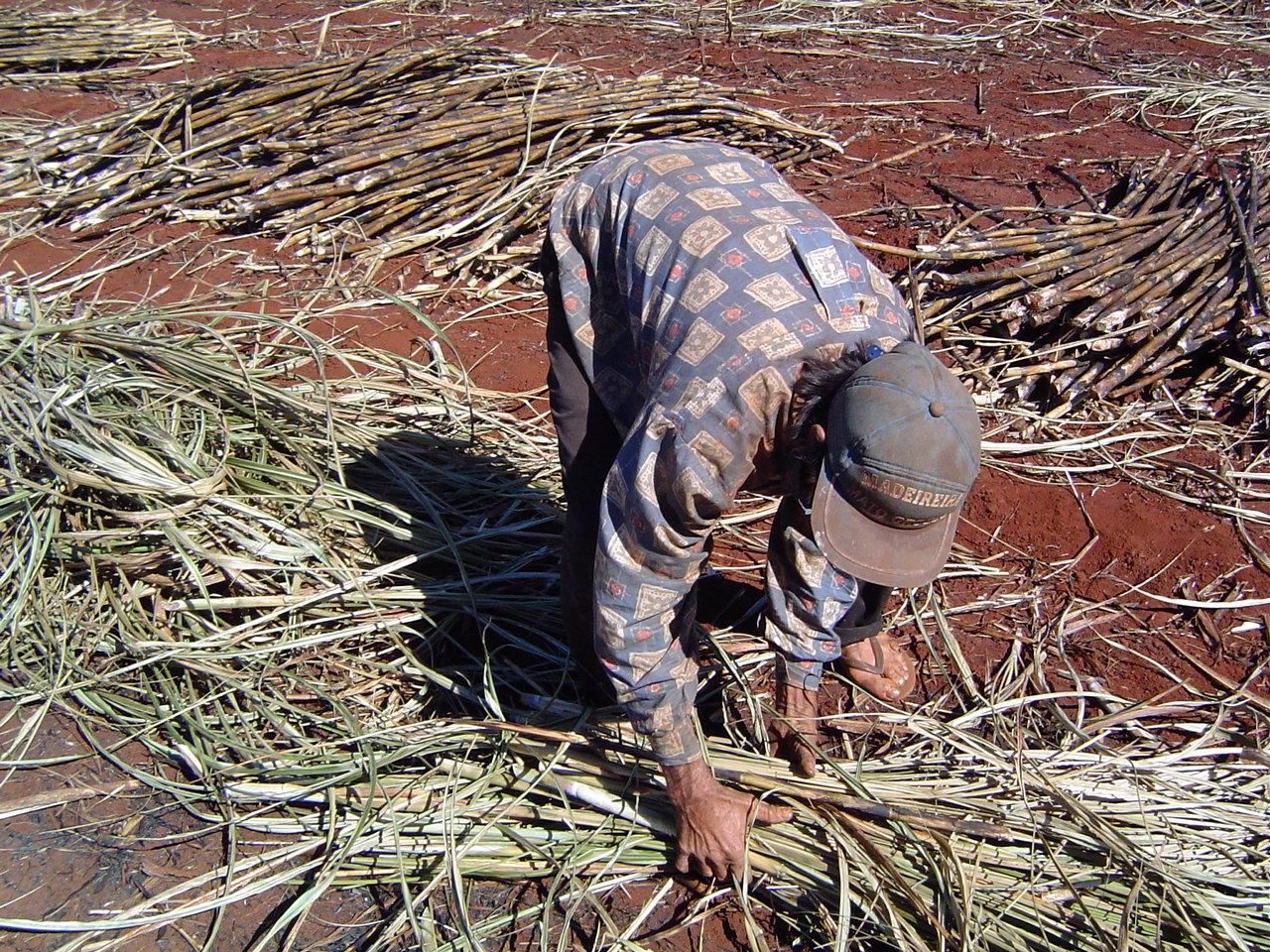
Barley slavery in a sugar plantation in the country.

Slavery is illegal in Brazil. Slavery and labor situations like depression era company towns still exist in remote areas in Brazil like the Amazon (a fictional portrayal of such a town occurs in The Rundown). "Debt slavery" (where workers are forced to work to pay an ever-increasing debt) still exists in some rural areas, though it is illegal and the government actively fights against it. The "debt slavery" is particularly worrying in large sugar cane farms, since sugar cane is a raw material for ethanol, a product that the Brazilian government is currently actively encouraging the production and research of.

In 2014, Brazil is still classified in a U.S. Department of Labor report as one of the 74 countries that still employ children and slave laborers within the informal working sector. A List of Goods Produced by Child Labor or Forced Labor issued within the report shows 16 products including cotton, cashews, pineapples, rice and sugarcane corresponding to the country of Brazil.

Human rights abuse isn't limited to just the local population but to foreign domestic workers as well. In 2017, a Philippines national was found in conditions of Modern slavery working for a Brazilian family.

== Domestic violence ==
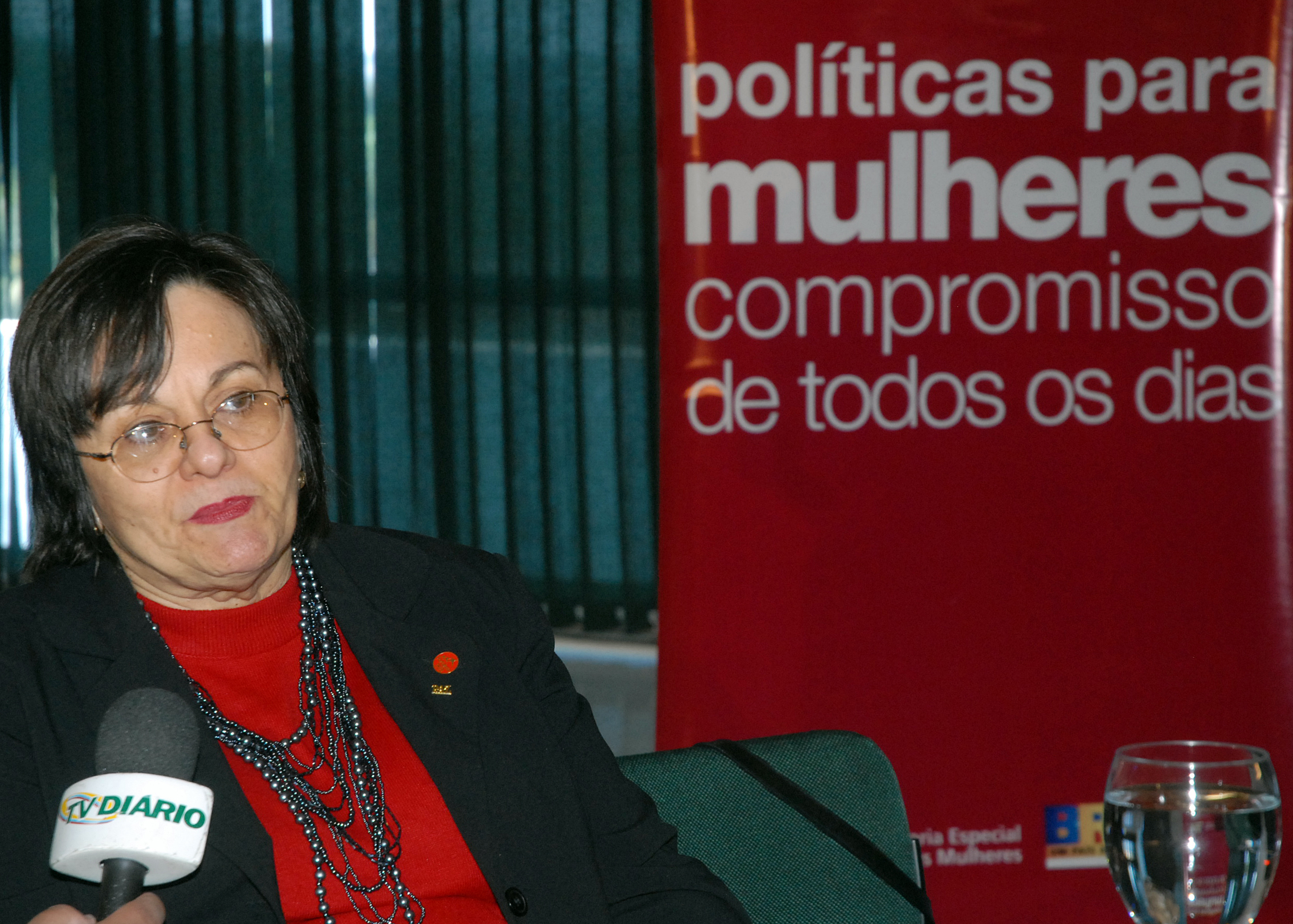
Maria da Penha celebrating the two years of Maria da Penha Law in Brasília.

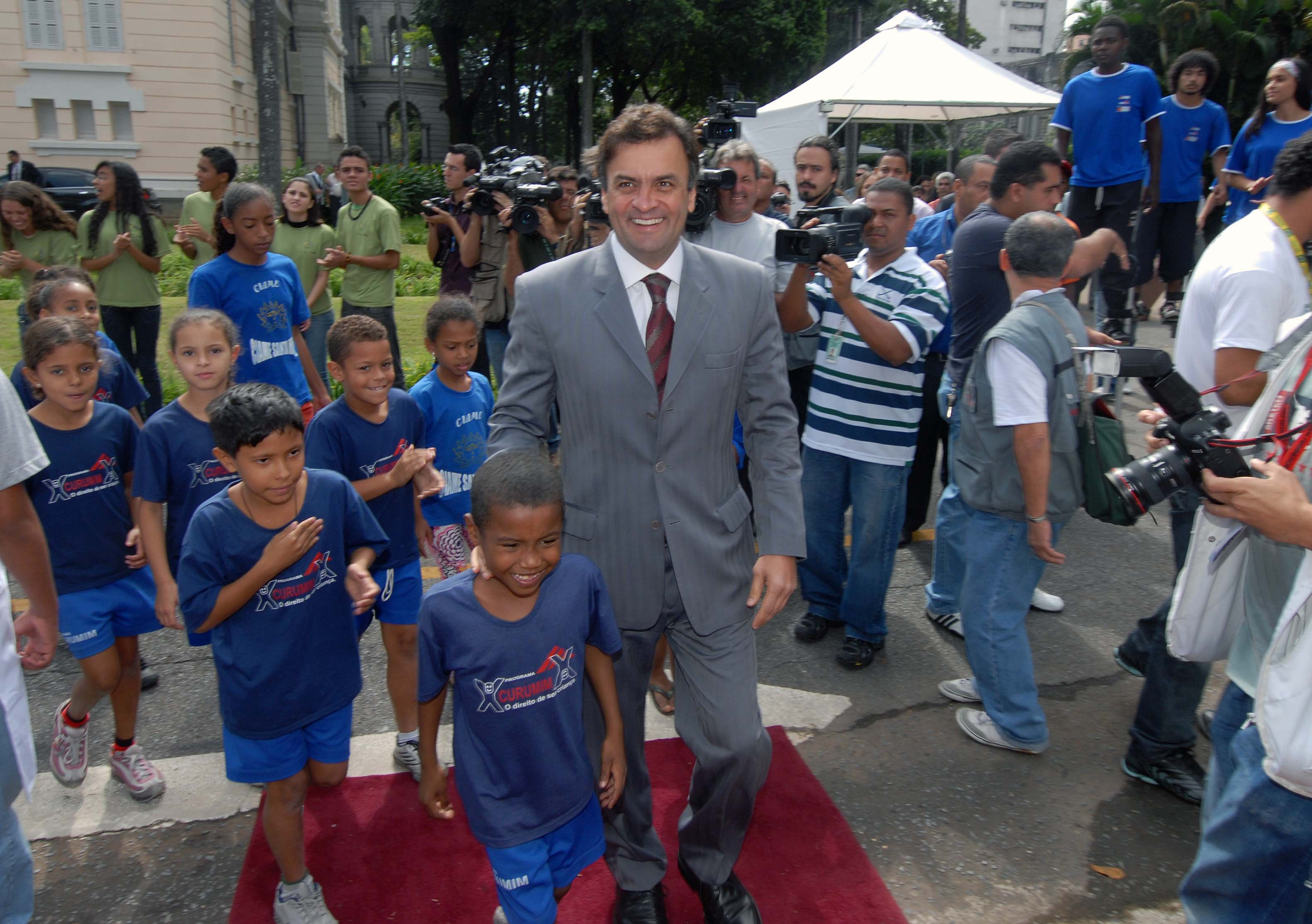
The governor of Minas Gerais, Aécio Neves, during the Campaign Protect Our Children.

On August 7, 2006, Brazilian President Luiz Inácio Lula da Silva signed a law on domestic and family violence against women in Brasília.

== Ethnic minorities ==
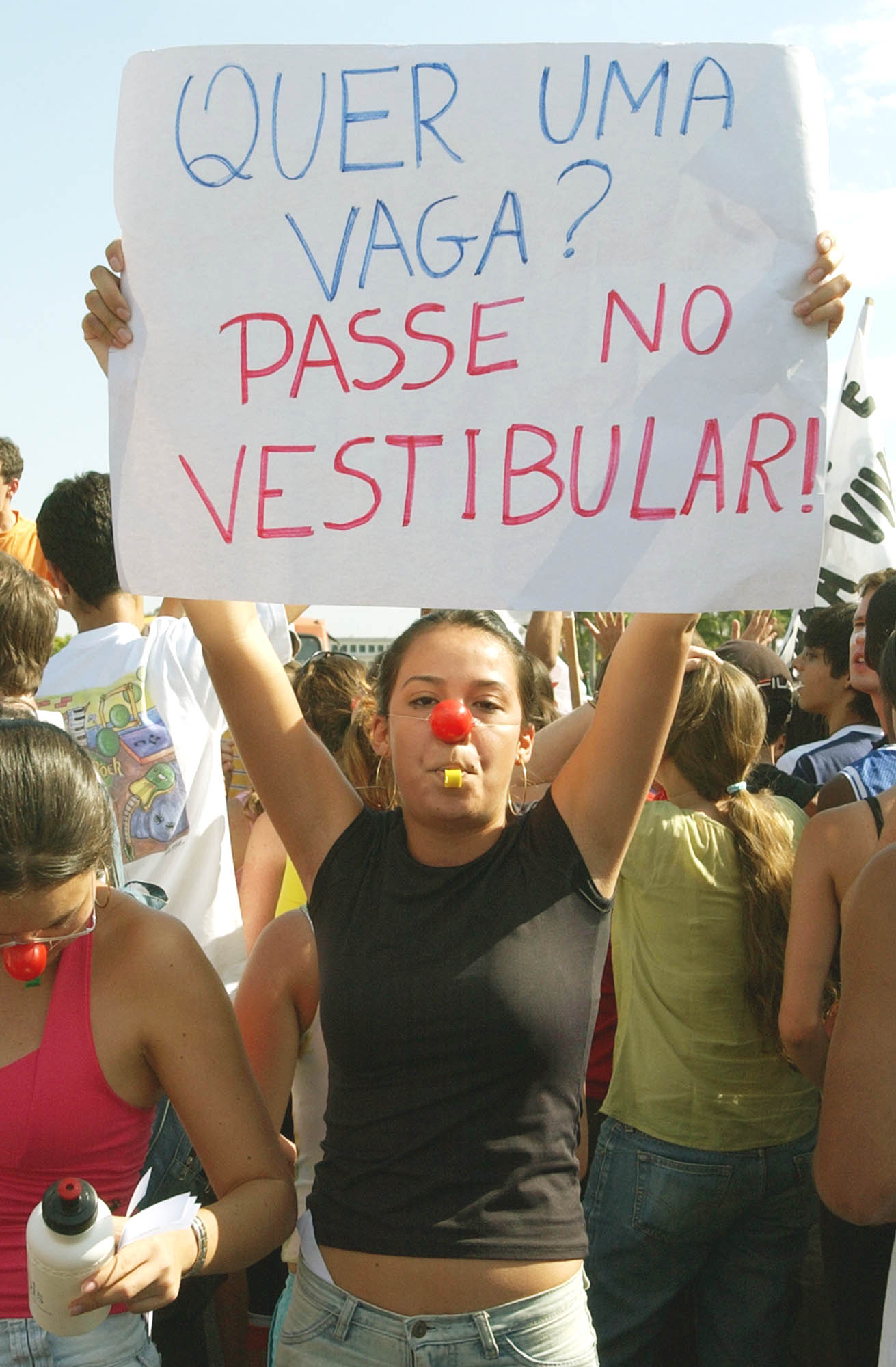
Protest against university quotas for Afro-descendants in Brasília. The large poster says: "Wanna get into college? Pass the test!"

Although the law prohibits racial discrimination, darker-skinned citizens, particularly Afro-Brazilians, frequently encountered discrimination. The law specifically prohibits denial of public or private facilities, employment, or housing to anyone based on race. The law also prohibits, and provides jail terms for, the incitement of racial discrimination or prejudice and the dissemination of racially offensive symbols and epithets. Afro-Brazilians, representing almost 7% of the population, were significantly underrepresented in the government, professional positions, and the middle and upper classes. They experienced a higher rate of unemployment and earned average wages approximately half those of a white person. There was also a sizeable racial education gap. In February in a government report to the UN, SEDH acknowledged the existence of racism in the country but stated that the government took and was taking affirmative actions to reduce it, including university admission quotas for Afro-descendants.

Major public universities in the Federal District and the states of São Paulo, Rio de Janeiro, Paraná, Mato Grosso, Minas Gerais, Espírito Santo, Bahia, and others maintained affirmative action programs. For instance, the University of Brasília set aside 25 percent of its first-year 2007 vacancies for self-declared students of color. According to a study from Rio de Janeiro Federal University released in January, approximately half of the public federal and state universities had a quota system or an exam bonus.

The law grants the indigenous population broad rights, including the protection of their cultural patrimony and the exclusive use of their traditional lands. Although multiple problems existed, the government made limited progress in securing these rights. The National Indigenous Foundation (FUNAI) estimated that there were 460,000 indigenous persons in 225 societies on indigenous lands and an additional 100,000 to 190,000 indigenous persons living outside these areas, including in urban environments. According to the Ministry of Education, 20 state and federal universities continued to reserve entrance slots for indigenous persons. The number of indigenous university students, almost 5,000 or approximately 1 percent of total university students, remained unchanged.

== Women's rights ==
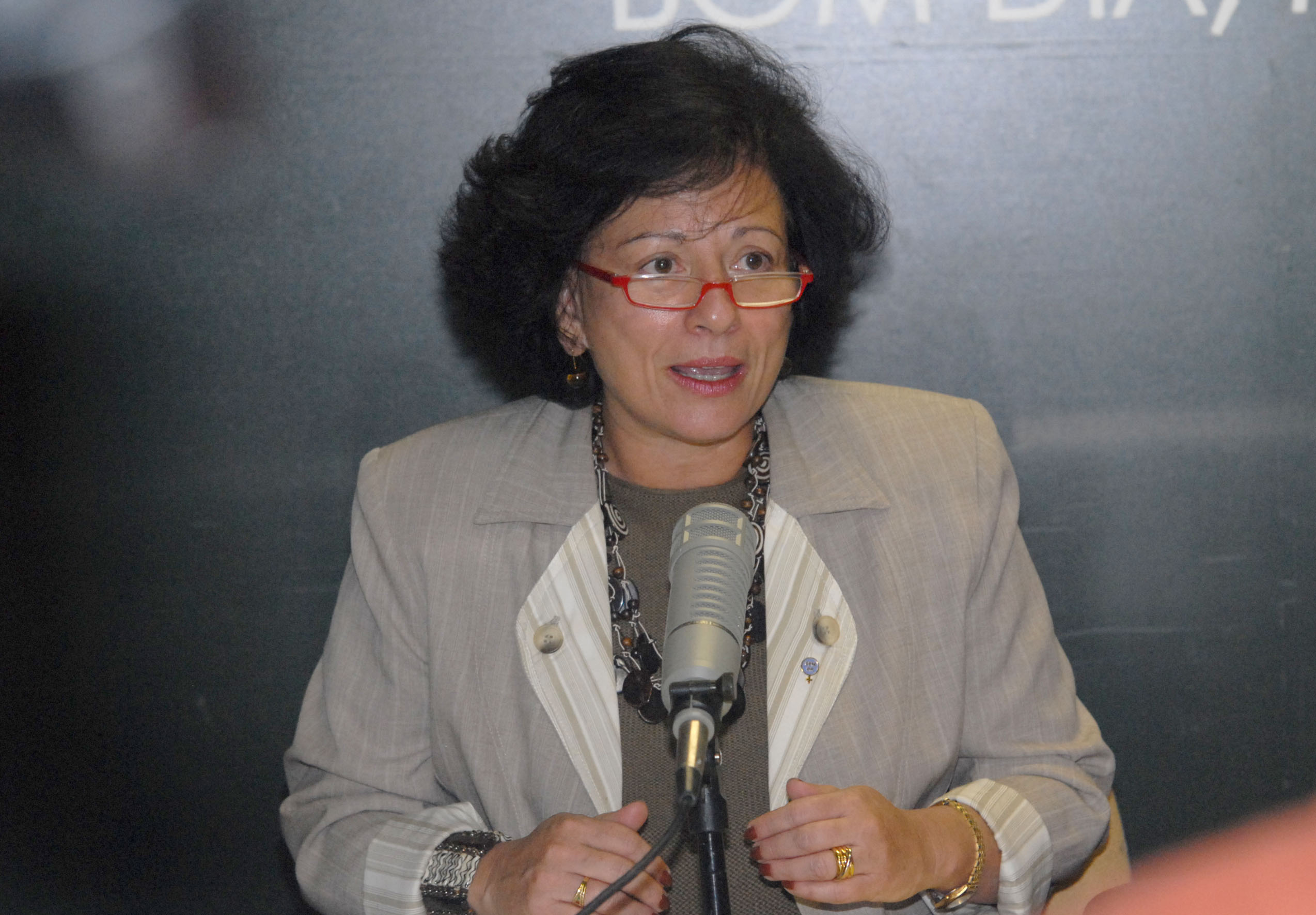
Nilcéa Freire, Special Secretariat of Policies for Women

Women have the same legal rights as men. A cabinet-level office, the Secretariat for Women's Policy, oversees a special entity charged with ensuring the legal rights of women. Although the law prohibits discrimination based on gender in employment and wages, there were significant wage disparities between men and women. According to the Ministry of Labor and Employment (MTE), women were often paid less than men in the same functions.

The law provides 120 days of paid maternity leave to women and seven days of paternity leave to men. The law also prohibits employers from requiring applicants or employees to take pregnancy tests or present sterilization certificates, but some employers sought sterilization certificates from female job applicants or tried to avoid hiring women of childbearing age. Violations of the law are punishable by jail terms of up to two years for employers, while the company may be fined 10 times the salary of its highest-paid employee.

Prostitution is legal, but exploiting it through associated activities, such as operating a brothel, is illegal. While no specific laws address sex tourism, it is punishable under other criminal offenses, and there was a government-released "code of conduct to combat sex tourism and sexual exploitation" and government-conducted campaigns in the most affected areas.

The Federal District and the states of Pernambuco, Espírito Santo, Amazonas, and Paraná enacted laws requiring certain businesses to display signs listing the penalties for having sexual intercourse with a minor. Rio de Janeiro and Bahia states had similar legislation. Women's groups reported that prostitutes encountered discrimination when seeking free medical care. Trafficking of women for the purpose of prostitution was a serious problem.

Each state secretariat for public security operated "delegacias da mulher" (DEAMs), police stations dedicated exclusively to addressing crimes against women, for a total of 415 countrywide. The quality of services varied widely, and availability was particularly limited in isolated areas. For example, the North and Northeast regions, which contained approximately 35 percent of the country's population, possessed only 24 percent of the country's DEAMs.

The stations provided psychological counseling, temporary shelter, and hospital treatment for victims of domestic violence and rape (including treatment for HIV and other sexually transmitted diseases) as well as criminal prosecution assistance by investigating and forwarding evidence to courts. There were also 123 reference centers and 66 women's shelters.

In Rio de Janeiro, the city's Rio Women Program provided assistance to female victims of domestic violence who received death threats. When necessary, victims were sent to specific shelters, which also provided psychological and legal aid. In addition to the Women Program, victims of domestic violence could obtain assistance at the Center for Women's Support, an initiative of the Rio de Janeiro state government that offered a complaint hot line, shelters, and psychological and legal aid.

The law requires health facilities to contact the police regarding cases in which a woman was harmed physically, sexually, or psychologically in order to collect evidence and statements should the victim decide to prosecute. Sexual harassment is a criminal offense, punishable by up to two years in prison. The law encompasses sexual advances in the workplace or in educational institutions and between service providers or clients.

In the workplace it applies only in hierarchical situations, where the harasser is of higher rank or position than the victim. Although the law was enforced, accusations were rare, and the extent of the problem was not documented.

== Prisoner violence ==
The Brazilian prison system has been considered insolvent for a long time. Prisons are overcrowded and unhealthy, and prison rape is not uncommon. There are over 400,000 inmates in the system. Beatings, torture and killings by prison guards occur throughout the system. Children are abused in the juvenile justice system. According to the Ministry of Justice, 13,489 teenagers are in detention. Prison overcrowding results in a prominent occurrence of prison violence and murder as well as frequent revolts and escapes. To deal with these problems, prison administrations often divide prison populations according to gang affiliation. According to Global Justice, there have been claims of gang affiliation being assigned. Living space, food, and human cleanliness conditions are inhumane and bribery for privileges and transfers is rampant. In December 2007, a case of prison gang rape in Pará brought media attention to the condition of human rights in the Brazil prison system. Other cases, like of the beating of two young suspects by two military police officers from the 4th Battalion in the city of Picos, Piauí, have also made the headlines.

Prison conditions throughout the country often range from poor to extremely harsh and life-threatening. Abuse by prison guards, poor medical care, and severe overcrowding occurred at multiple facilities. Prison officials often resorted to brutal treatment of prisoners, including torture, harsh or dangerous working conditions, official negligence, poor sanitary conditions, abuse and mistreatment by guards, and a lack of medical care led to a number of deaths in prisons. Poor working conditions and low pay for prison guards encouraged widespread corruption. Prisoners who committed petty crimes were held with murderers. According to the National Penitentiary Department, in June there were 392,279 prisoners incarcerated, 40 percent more than the system's design capacity, and the number increased approximately 3,000 per month. During the year 135 prisoners were involved in riots from January to June in federal prisons. There were several official complaints of overcrowding in Goiás, Rio de Janeiro, São Paulo, and Minas Gerais states.

== Summary executions and police violence ==
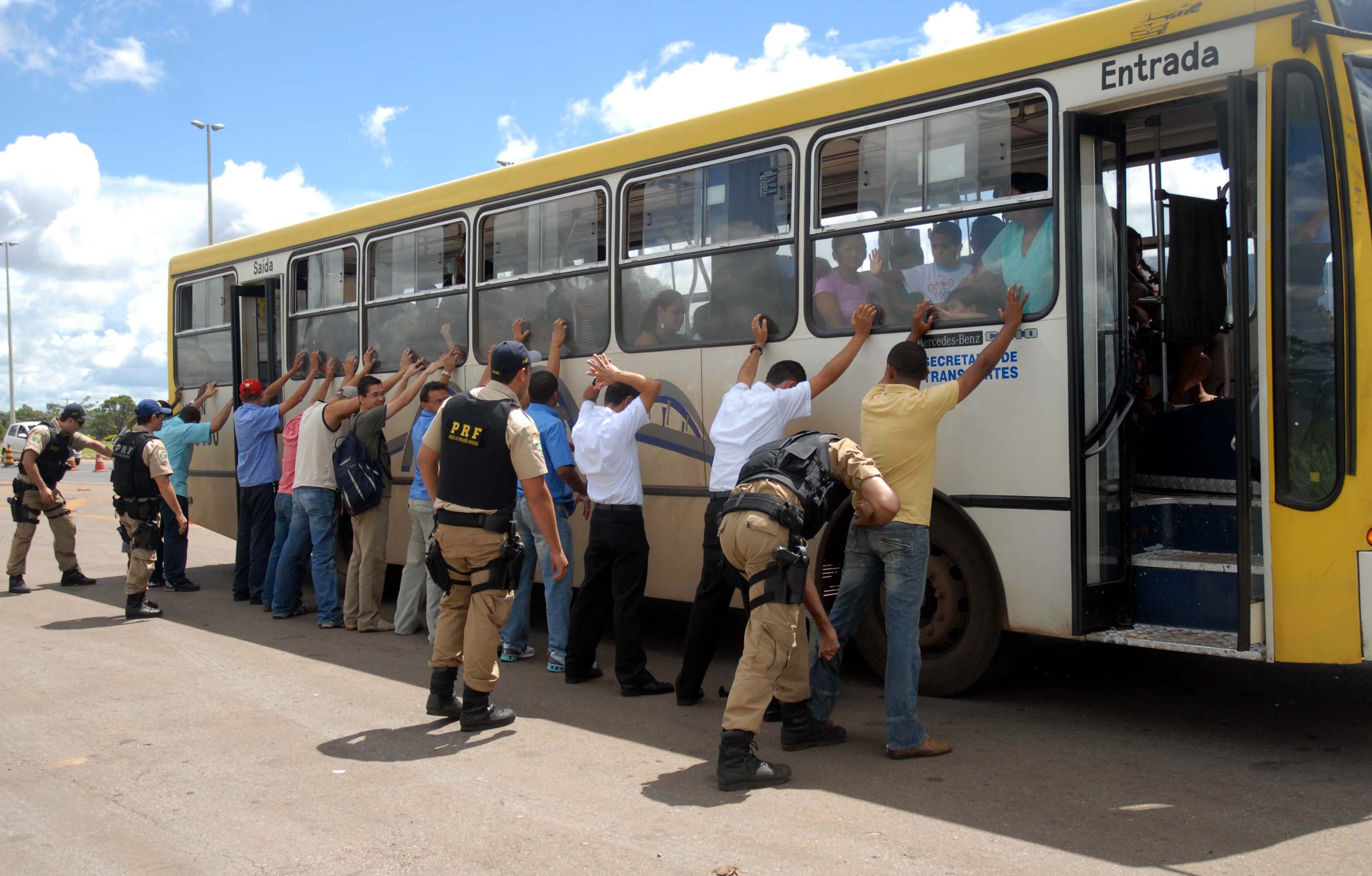
Police approach civil population in the Brazilian Federal District.

Police violence is one of the most internationally recognized human rights abuses in Brazil. The problem of urban violence focuses on the perpetual struggle between police and residents of high crime favelas such as the areas portrayed in the film City of God and mainly Elite Squad.

Police response in parts of Brazil is violent, including summary execution and torture of suspects. According to Global Justice, in 2003, the police killed 1,195 people in the State of Rio de Janeiro alone. In the same year 45 police officers were killed. It is often reacted to by local communities and trafficking groups with demonstrations and violent resistance, causing escalation and multiplying victims. Unofficial estimates show there are over 3,000 deaths annually from police violence in Brazil, according to Human Rights Watch. There are constant complaints of racism, abuses, torture, executions and disappearances. Not all states record police killings or keep accurate statistics. Campaigns and demonstrations have been made against the police by relatives of victims, such as Sonia Bonfim Vicente, whose husband and son were killed in Rio de Janeiro in 2021.

Reports of killings by Rio de Janeiro police decreased during the year under a new state security strategy. Statistics released by the Rio de Janeiro State Secretariat for Public Security showed 911 persons killed as a result of police confrontations from January through September, a 12 percent decrease over the same period in 2007. The Rio de Janeiro Institute for Public Security reported that police killed an average of four persons per day during 2007. According to a UN report released in September, police clashes resulted in 1,260 civilian deaths in Rio de Janeiro State in 2007. Most of these killings occurred during "acts of resistance," the UN report commented. The São Paulo State Secretariat for Public Security reported that São Paulo state police (civil and military) killed 340 civilians in the state from January to September, compared with 315 during the same period in 2007. Cases involving extrajudicial executions were either under police investigation or before the state courts; observers believed that it could take years to resolve such cases.

There were no reports of politically motivated disappearances. However, the Center of Studies of Security and Citizenship estimated that in 2006 approximately 1,940 persons "disappeared"; the center believed some were killed by police. There were no developments in the disappearance cases that occurred during the 1964-85 military dictatorship, and 400 cases remained for the Amnesty Commission to analyze. There were also no developments regarding the 2007 Chamber of Deputies' Human Rights Committee request that the government seize documents to determine the circumstances of military regime political prisoner deaths and the locations of their remains.

== Torture ==
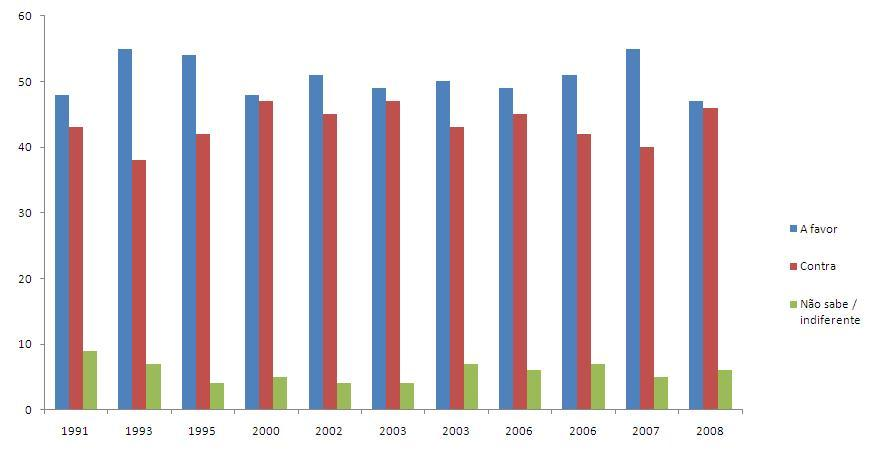
Opinion polls about death penalty in Brazil since 1991: Favourable Against Undefined Source: Datafolha institute.

Brazil's 21-year military dictatorship, ushered in with a U.S.-backed coup in 1964, tortured thousands of Brazilian citizens—anyone even suspected of opposing the authoritarian regime. As of 1988, torture is illegal in Brazil. However, the nation still suffers from state-sanctioned brutality today, including the torture of those incarcerated. Perhaps then it is not surprising that torture in Brazil is widespread and systematic, according to the ex-UN Special Rapporteur. Occurrence of police torture accompanies murder or effecting intimidation and extortion. Torture has also been widely reported in detention centers and mental institutions. Although the constitution prohibits torture and provides severe legal penalties for its use, torture by police and prison guards remained a serious and widespread problem. In February the government's National Human Rights Secretariat (SEDH) acknowledged that torture existed in the country and related the problem to societal tolerance and the fear of retaliation.

Federal, state, and military police often enjoyed impunity in cases of torture, as in other cases of abuse. During the year an additional state (for a total of 13 of 26) adopted the National Plan for the Prevention and Control of Torture, which includes the installation of cameras in prisons and penitentiaries, taping of interrogations, and reversal of the presumption of innocence for those accused of torture.

During the first half of the year, the São Paulo State Ombudsman's Office received five complaints of torture by police, compared with seven during the same period of 2007. Police continued to abuse transvestite prostitutes in Rio de Janeiro, Belo Horizonte, and Salvador, according to the Gay Group of Bahia. Police routinely investigated such allegations, which rarely resulted in punishment (see section 5 Other Societal Abuses and Discrimination). In Rio de Janeiro, militia members reportedly continued to use physical abuse, degrading treatment, and torture to spread fear and establish control over favela residents. While militia members, some of them off-duty and former law enforcement officers, often began by taking community policing into their own hands, some intimidated residents and conducted other illegal activity. In May militia members reportedly kidnapped, tortured, and released two O Dia newspaper investigative journalists in Rio de Janeiro's Batan favela, when they were discovered living there undercover to investigate militias.

The Rio de Janeiro military police officer, who publicly defended the use of torture in 2007 and was subsequently transferred, was assigned command of the 38th Military Police Battalion in Três Rios. The nine police officers, including the police chief of Osasco, São Paulo, charged in 2007 with theft, torture, extortion, beating, and threatening to rape to extort money, remained free and continued to await a trial that at year's end was not scheduled. In October 2007 the Inter-American Commission on Human Rights (IACHR) adopted several findings in a case originated in 1998, that authorities had violated the rights of Antonio Ferreira Braga by illegally arresting and torturing him in 1993 in Ceará State, and that the government had failed to prevent and punish said acts, and also made four recommendations. After various exchanges the IACHR announced on July 18 that the government had fulfilled one recommendation (training police on humane treatment), but not two others (investigation and punishment of those responsible, compensation of the victim), and that one remained pending (investigation of possible negligence of authorities).

== Agrarian violence and oppression ==
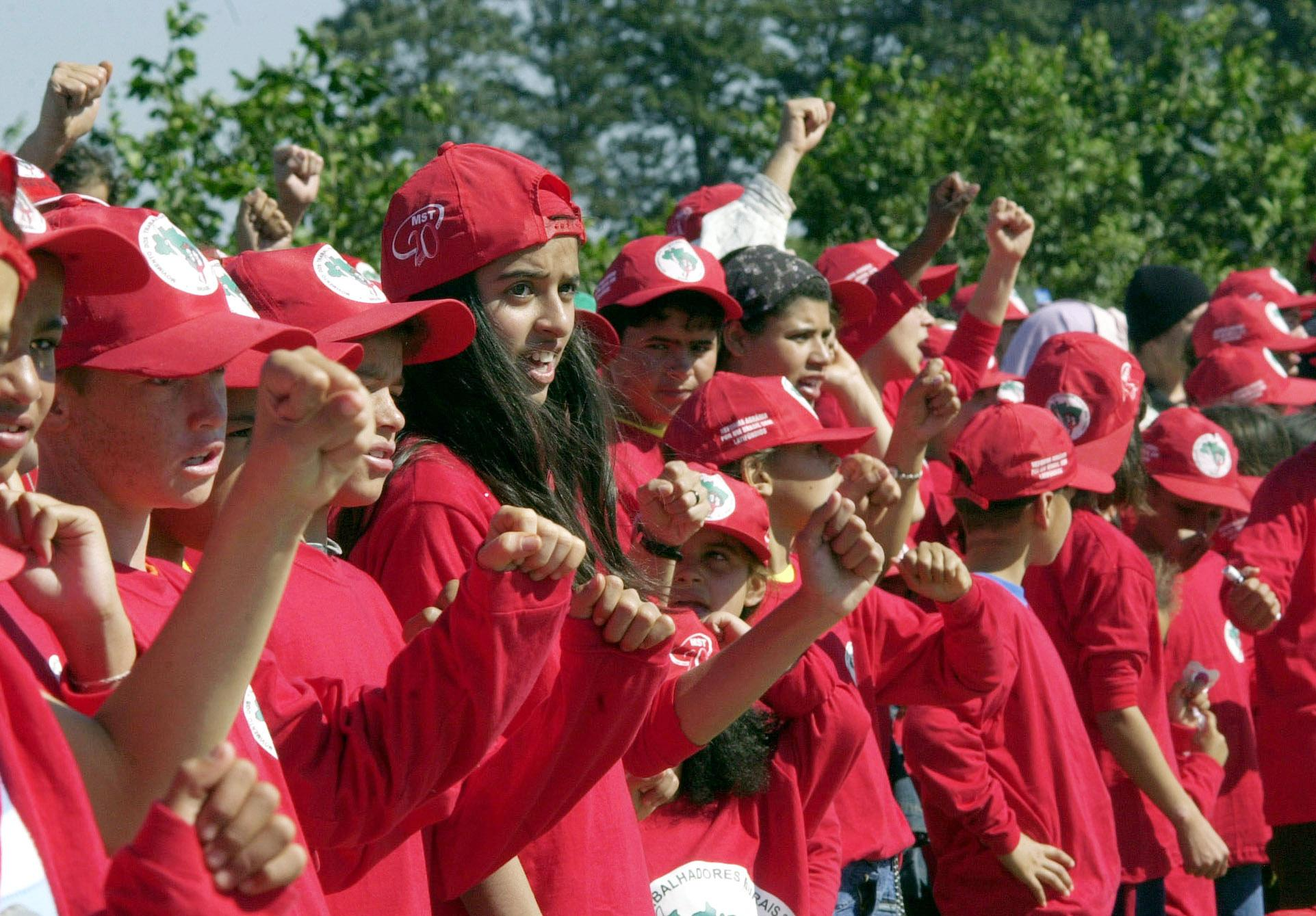
Children's celebrating the twenty years of Landless Workers' Movement, in the city of Itapeva.

The agrarian struggle in Brazil is manifold, touching on the topics of deforestation, dam building, eviction, squatting, and wildlife smuggling. The enormous Landless Workers' Movement in Brazil involves large and migrating landless populations. Landowners resort policemen to drive and intimidate landless populations from their properties.

Other cases of agrarian human rights violations involve invasion of properties and taking landowners as hostages, in order to force the government to provide land for the Landless Worker's Movement. Further agrarian violence arises from smugglers of exotic animals, wood, and other minerals from extracting contraband from forest or agrarian areas. In Brazil, the Movimento dos Trabalhadores Rurais Sem Terra (MST) has 1.5 million people in the group.

== Indigenous violence ==
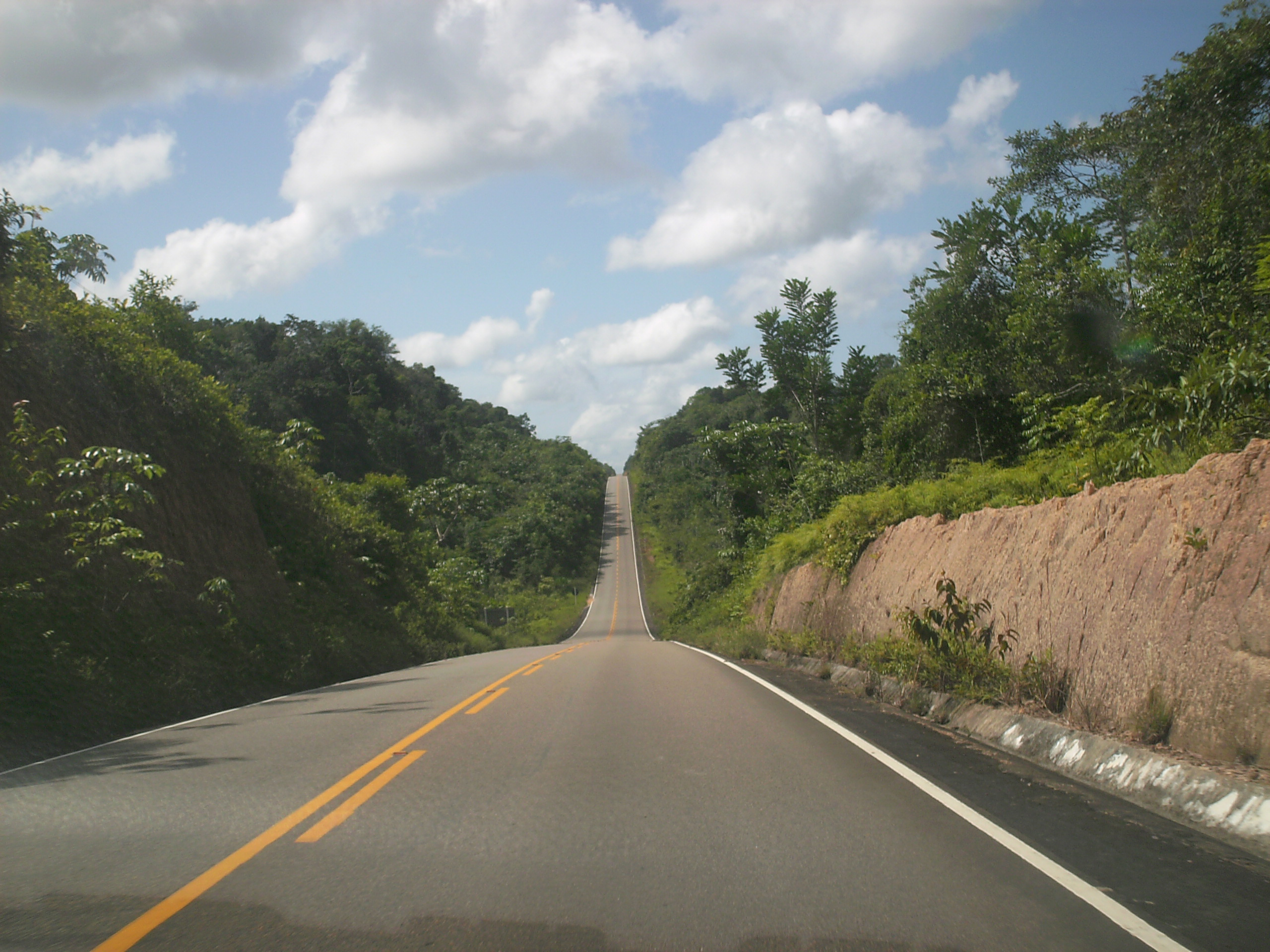
Indigenous Reserve in the State of Roraima.

As deforestation companies move in to take advantage of the large area of space the Amazon offers, indigenous tribes that live in the forest are subject to violence. To protect their land, some indigenous people attack the new arrivals, who fight back, leading to violence and deaths.

The law provides indigenous persons with exclusive beneficial use of the soil, waters, and minerals on indigenous lands, but Congress must approve each case. The government administers the lands but must consider the views of affected communities regarding their development or use, and communities have the right to profit from such use. However, indigenous leaders and activists complained that indigenous peoples had only limited participation in decisions taken by the government affecting their land, cultures, traditions, and allocation of national resources.

It is also criticized the government for devoting insufficient resources to health care, other basic services, and protection of indigenous reserves from outsiders. Non-indigenous people who illegally exploited indigenous lands for mining, logging, and agriculture often destroyed the environment and wildlife and caused violent confrontations. Fundação Nacional do Índio, which acknowledged insufficient resources to protect indigenous lands from encroachment, depended on the understaffed and poorly equipped Federal Police for law enforcement on indigenous lands. November 13, 2012, the national indigenous peoples association from Brazil APIB submitted to the United Nation a human rights document that complaints about new proposed laws in Brazil that would further undermine their rights if approved. A report about violence towards Afro-Brazilians and Indigenous Brazilians was released by the Brazilian government on May 5, 2020.

During the presidency of Jair Bolsonaro (2019–2022) and the second presidency of Lula da Silva (2023), a series of mass deaths, famine, forced displacements and other major human rights violations took place in the Brazilian Yanomami Indigenous Territory. Such events reportedly started or were aggravated from 2019 on as a consequence of rampant exploitation of natural resources by individuals and companies with state approval, and have been frequently said to constitute a genocide against the Yanomami people. It is part of the larger ongoing genocide of Indigenous peoples in Brazil.

== Refugees ==
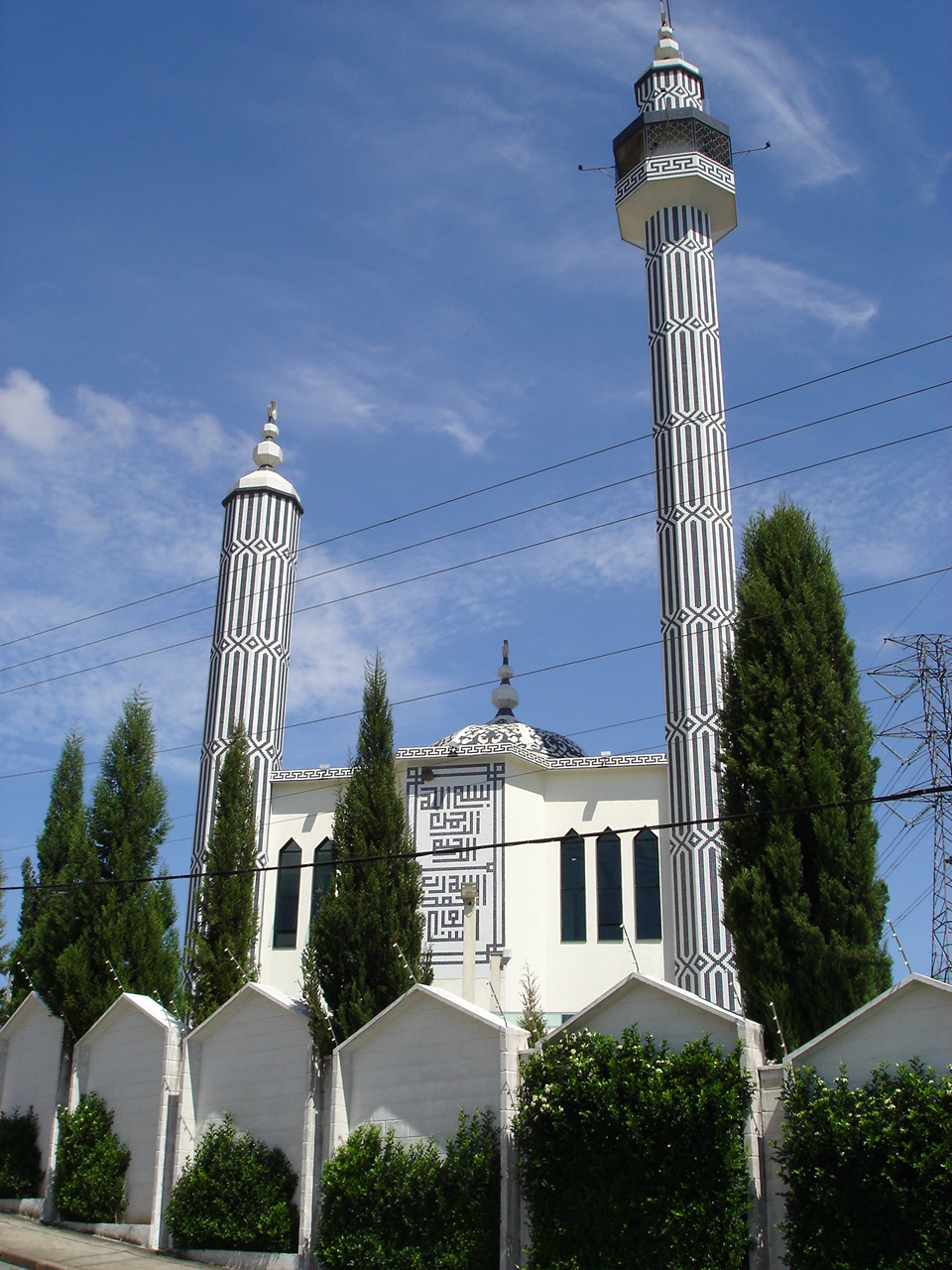
Mosque founded by Islamic refugees in the city of Mogi das Cruzes.

The law provides for the granting of asylum or refugee status in accordance with the 1951 UN Convention relating to the Status of Refugees and its 1967 protocol, and the government has established a system for providing protection to refugees. In practice the government provided protection against the expulsion or return of refugees to countries where their lives or freedom would be threatened.

The government provided temporary protection to individuals who may not qualify as refugees under the 1951 convention and the 1967 protocol. The government cooperated with the Office of the UN High Commissioner for Refugees (UNHCR) and other humanitarian organizations in assisting refugees and asylum seekers.

The UNHCR estimated that approximately 600 persons fled to the country from the September conflict in Pando, Bolivia, and 70 requested asylum. According to the National Committee for Refugees, at the end of the year there were 3,918 recognized refugees in the country. During the year authorities granted refugee status to 226 individuals. Those who maintain their status, which is reviewed every two years, may receive identity and travel documents and work and study in the country.

From 1998 to 2008, 4,515 persons sought asylum, according to news reports. There were, in addition to officially recognized refugees, approximately 17,500 de facto Colombian refugees in the country's Amazon region, according to the 2008 World Refugee Survey. A number of asylum seekers did not have government support because of the poor infrastructure in the region. Relations with local communities were increasingly difficult because of pressures on the educational and health systems.

== Violence against human rights defenders ==
Many human rights defenders who have arisen to oppose human rights violations and their families and friends suffer violence and persecution across Brazil. Telephone death threats are prominent and often followed through by ambush or assassination.

Government officials, attorneys, union leaders and even religious leaders have often been targeted, as with Antonio Fernandez Saenz affair. The danger of human rights defense entered the world press with the murder of Dorothy Stang in 2005, and Chico Mendes in 1988.

On 11 April 2022, the Office of the United Nations High Commissioner for Human Rights(OHCHR) issued a statement condemning the restrictions on Brazilians’ rights to full and active social and political participation, and the appalling levels of violence directed against human rights defenders, women journalists, indigenous peoples and traditional communities in particular of African-descent.

== LGBT rights ==
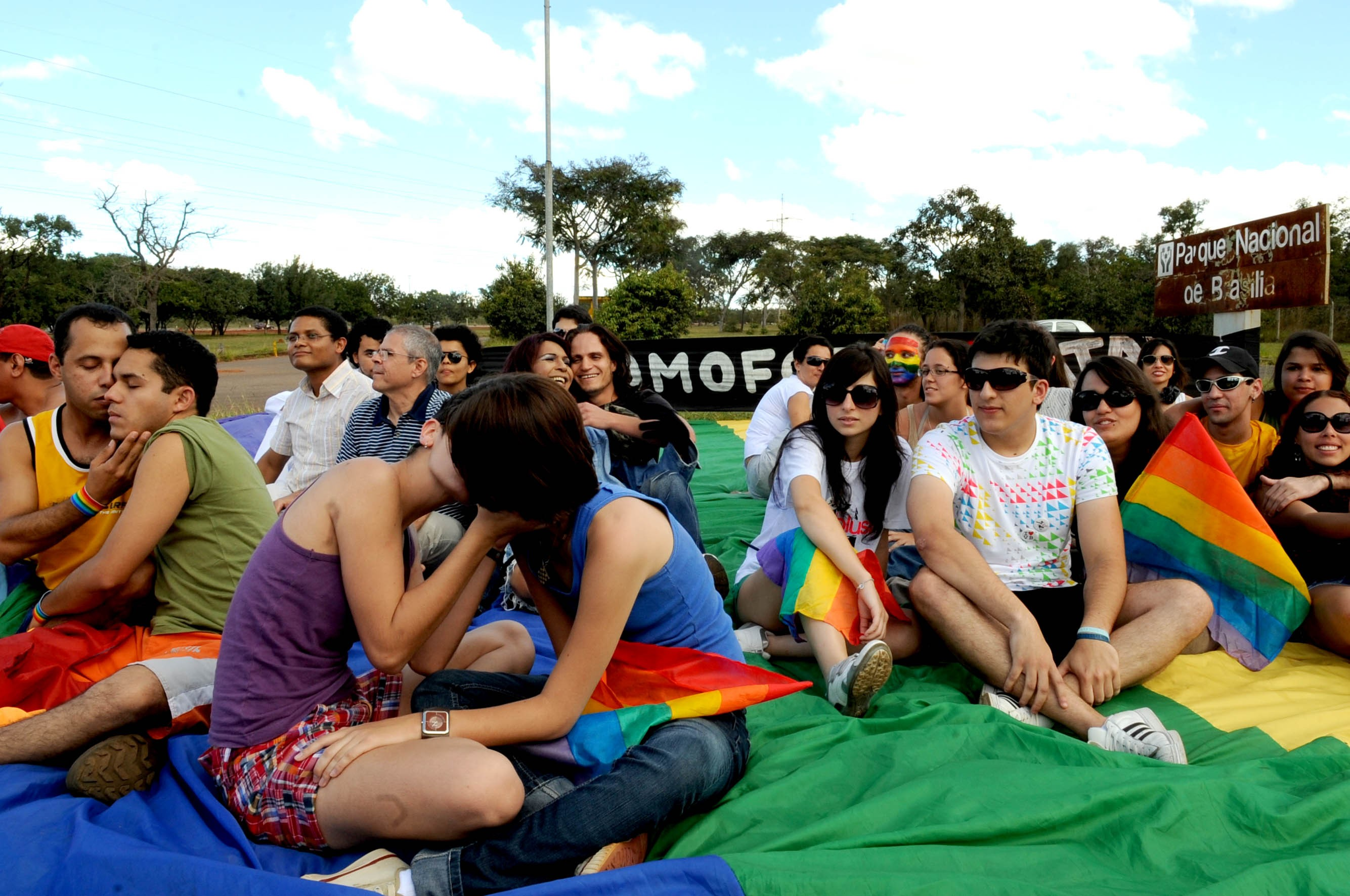
Anti-discrimination protest in Brasília.

Lesbian, gay, bisexual, and transgender (LGBT) people in Brazil enjoy a number of the same legal protections available to non-LGBT people, with LGBT people having marriage rights available nationwide since May 2013. It is allowed for same-sex couples to marry, and have the same legal rights as married heterosexuals.

The São Paulo Gay Pride Parade is the world's largest LGBT pride celebration, with 4 million people in 2009. Brazil had more than 60,000 same-sex couples in 2010 (IBGE). The country also has 300 active LGBT organizations.

Prejudice against LGBT groups has also decreased according to data from a survey of Ibope, Brazil's institute for statistics and public opinion. 60% of Brazilians consider homosexuality natural. However, violence and prejudice remains, and Brazil is one of the countries where the most gay people are killed. According to the report "Epidemic of Hate", published in 1996 by the International Gay and Lesbian Human Rights Commission, at least 1,200 gays, lesbians and transsexuals were killed in Brazil in a decade.

== See also ==
- Anti-discrimination laws in Brazil
- Social apartheid in Brazil
- Women's rights in Brazil
- Heráclito Fontoura Sobral Pinto
- Candelária massacre (1993)
- Carandiru massacre (1992)
- Complexo do Alemão massacre (2007)
- Police brutality in Brazil
- Brazilian Military Criminal Code

== Further reading & external links ==
- Zimbardo, et al. Violence Workers
- France Winddance Twine "Racism in a Racial Democracy"
- Hub.witness.org, "Bound by Promises", video co-produced by Witness and Comissão Pastoral da Terra (CPT) about slave labor.
- UN.org, "Review of Brazil" by the United Nations Human Rights Council's Universal Periodic Review, April 11, 2008
