= Bahrain administrative reforms of the 1920s =

The administrative reforms of the 1920s were a series of British-led reforms that have laid the foundations of modern Bahrain. They took place between 1919 and 1927, but their background extends to the early 19th century. Britain signed a number of treaties with Bahrain in 1820, 1861, 1880 and 1892. The latter two had effectively turned Bahrain into a British Protectorate. Earlier in 1869, Britain had appointed the young Shaikh Isa ibn Ali Al Khalifa as ruler. Shaikh Isa was an autocrat and a feudal overlord whose authority was shared with his family and Sunni tribal allies. The economy was dependent on pearl diving and palm farming. Both sectors suffered from great inequalities; the conditions of the mostly Baharnah (Shia) peasants and the mostly non-Bahraini divers were often compared to slaves. Since the beginning of the 20th century, the British influence in Bahrain has been on the rise; in 1904-5 they extended their jurisdiction over all foreigners and in 1913 issued an Order in Council, which effectively turned Bahrain into a colony. The Order was not implemented until after the end of World War I.

The reforms began in February 1919 after the British Political Agent, Captain Bray, announced that the Order was effective. Bray's next step to appoint half members of al-Majlis al-Urfi, a council concerned with commercial disputes encountered opposition from Shaikh Isa which led to its suspension. In November, Major H. R. P. Dickson was appointed Political Agent. He introduced the Joint Court, the Municipal Council of Manama and resumed the meetings of al-Majlis al-Urfi. Dickson was resented by the ruler and his tribal allies, but enjoyed the support of Baharnah whom he encouraged to rise against their oppressors. In 1921, Major Daly was appointed Political Agent. A few months later, he started undermining the influence of Shaikh Abdulla, the youngest son of Shaikh Isa, in favor of his older brother and the heir apparent, Shaikh Hamad. Starting from mid-1921, Bahrain witnessed a series of petitions supporting and opposing the reforms. They were submitted to different British officials up to the Foreign Office. The supporting faction was composed of Daly, Shaikh Hamad, his supporters and the Baharnah. The Baharnah demanded equity, as they had to pay numerous discriminatory taxes and were subjected to maltreatment and oppression. The other faction, composed of Shaikh Isa, Shaikh Abdulla, tribesmen and pearl merchants opposed the reforms, because they were set to abolish their absolute powers and superior social status.

Faced with Britain's inaction, the Baharnah staged an uprising in Manama in February 1922. Shaikh Isa agreed to most of their demands, but did not carry them out. The Al Dawasir tribe contacted Ibn Saud, asking for his help against the reforms. On the other hand, Persians launched media campaigns accusing Britain of overlooking the oppression of their co-religious Baharnah in Bahrain. The British position then changed and reforms were to be carried out even against the wishes of Shaikh Isa. In May 1923, 3 days of riots broke out in Manama between the Persians and Najdis. Elsewhere, Al Dawasir and Al Khawalid branch of the Al Khalifa ruling family attacked several Baharnah villages. The British intervened, deposing the aging Shaikh Isa after he refused to retire voluntarily and installed his elder son as the ruler of Bahrain. Al Dawasir and Al Khawalid resumed their attacks against Baharnah villages for which they were put on trial and found guilty. Al Dawasir migrated to Dammam in the mainland, while Al Khawalid were either banished for long years or sentenced to death in absentia after their escape. The remaining opponents of reforms continued their peaceful means of pressure which culminated in a congress held in October. The pro-reform faction responded with similar moves. The British banished the leaders of the aforementioned congress.

With the end of all forms of opposition, the road was paved for implementation of the administrative reforms. They included customs, judiciary, police, pearl diving and land reforms. Daly took an important part in implementing reforms, that higher authorities cautioned him to not become the actual ruler. He left in 1926 after appointing Charles Belgrave as adviser to the ruler. Some reforms proved to successful, such as those in customs, while others were inadequate, such as those in police and judiciary. By the end of the 1920s, Bahrain had developed a modern administration. British officials occupied several leading positions in it. The reforms also empowered the Baharnah politically and lifted much of the inequalities they had suffered from. Critics of the reforms often state that Sunni groups remained dominant, but only had to change the way they exercised authority. Others analyzed the purpose of British intervention and the aforementioned congress.

== Background ==
=== Early Al Khalifa rule ===
Bahrain fell under the control of Al Khalifa in 1783, following the defeat of Nasr Al-Madhkur who ruled the archipelago as a dependency of Persia. The first Al Khalifa ruler, Ahmed ibn Muhammad ibn Khalifa (1783–96) was based in Al Zubara (modern day Qatar) and spent summers in Bahrain. Following his death, Ahmed's sons Salman and Abdulla moved to Bahrain; they co-ruled it as feudal estates and imposed taxes on the Baharnah population. Salman settled in Bahrain Island and Abdulla in Muharraq Island, each of them ruling independently. The Al Khalifa soon became split into two branches, Al-Abdulla and Al-Salman that engaged in open conflict between 1842 and 1846. (Note: Inter-Al Khalifa conflicts within Bahrain began in 1828 and lasted until 1869.) Al-Salman branch was victorious and enjoyed complete rule of Bahrain. Until 1869, Bahrain was under threat of occupation by various external powers including the Wahhabis, Omanis, Ottomans, Egyptians and Persians, yet the Al Khalifa managed to keep it under their control. The Al-Abdulla branch continued to be a cause of threat until 1895.

=== Treaties with Britain ===
At the beginning of the eighteenth century, Britain, then the dominant power in the region was attempting to end piracy in the Persian Gulf in order to secure maritime trading routes to its East India Company in the Indies. In 1820, Britain signed the General Maritime Treaty with tribal chiefs of the Persian Gulf, including the Al Khalifa (at their request). By signing this treaty, Britain recognized Al Khalifa as "legitimate" rulers of Bahrain. Between 1820 and 1850, the Al Khalifa have repeatedly tried to persuade British authorities to provide full protection to Bahrain against external threats, but without avail. Britain wanted Bahrain to remain an independent state. The situation changed in 1859–60, when the Al Khalifa ruler appealed to the Persians and Ottomans to provide protection, and in 1861 blockaded Al-Hasa. This prompted the British in 1861 to force the ruler to sign a new treaty with Britain, the Perpetual Truce of Peace and Friendship; the ruler of Bahrain was not to engage in "prosecution of war, piracy and slavery at sea" and Britain was to provide maritime protection. The treaty also recognized the Al Khalifa ruler as an "independent ruler".

Six years later, in 1867–8, the British navy intervened after a Bahraini attack on Qatar. After two years, in 1869, they intervened again to end an internal struggle over power, and appointed Shaikh Isa ibn Ali Al Khalifa, then aged 21 as ruler of Bahrain. In subsequent years, the British exercised increasing control over Shaikh Isa's communications with foreign powers, especially the Ottomans, who had claims over Bahrain and Qatar. The increasing Ottoman influence in the region threatened the status quo in Bahrain and prompted Colonel Ross, the British Resident to sign a new treaty with Bahrain on 22 December 1880. The treaty prohibited the ruler of Bahrain from negotiating, signing treaties or accepting any form of diplomatic representation with foreign powers without British consent, with the exception of "customary friendly correspondence... of minor importance". It did not refer to Bahrain's independence. (Note: The text of the treaty read as follows: "I, Isa bin Ali Al Khalifeh, Chief of Bahrein, hereby bind myself and successors in the Government of Bahrein to the British Government to abstain from entering into negotiations or making treaties of any sort with any State or Government other than the British without the consent of the said British Government, and to refuse permission to any other Government than the British to establish diplomatic to consular agencies or coaling depots in our territory, unless with the consent of the British Government. This engagement does not apply to or affect the customary friendly correspondence with the local authorities of neighbouring States on business of minor importance".)

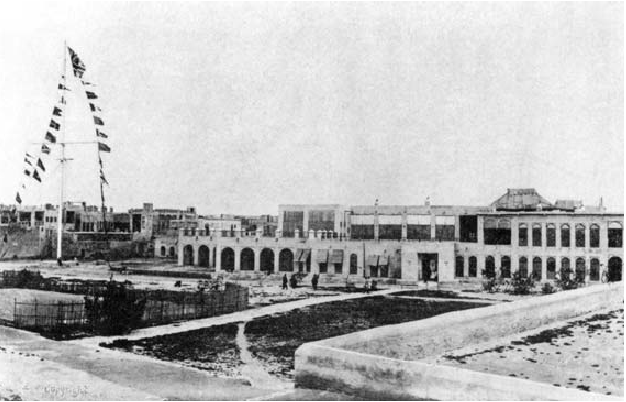
The Persian Gulf Residency headquarters in Bushire in 1902

Fearing the increasing Ottoman activity and French influence in the region, Britain signed a new treaty with Bahrain in 1892 which further limited the foreign relations of the ruler by prohibiting disposal of territory to any foreign power other than Britain. It also prohibited the minor communications exempted by the 1880 treaty. The treaties of 1880 and 1892 have effectively turned Bahrain into a British protectorate, giving the British control over defense and foreign relations. The ruler was also to accept British "advice" regarding internal matters. During this period, Bahrain was the center of British commercial operations in the region. Between 1829 and 1904, the Persian Gulf Residency appointed an Assistant post in Bahrain. It was occupied by natives until 1900 when a British was assigned to the post in order to accommodate the increase in British trade and attract British companies. The British were mainly concerned with their commercial interests and paid little attention to internal affairs. Britain is credited for the stability and growth Bahrain witnessed in the latter half of the 19th century.

=== Demographics ===
According to Lorimer, at the beginning of the 20th century (1905), the population of Bahrain was estimated at 100,000. Muslims formed the overwhelming majority (99%). The Sunni community who mostly lived in towns was estimated to form about 60% of the population, while the Shia community who mostly lived in villages were estimated at 40%. (Note: Bahraini journalist Abbas al-Murshid, stated that while Lorimer's estimate was the most accurate during this period, it suffered from two flaws. The first was that it counted the number of houses and huts and assumed each had 5 residents, while al-Murshid argued that rural areas had more residents per house due to the widespread prevalence of extended families. The second notice al-Murshid made is that the sectarian estimate referred to the whole population of Bahrain and not only Bahrainis. Al-Murshid mentioned two other estimates, one by Khayri in which he estimated that among residents of Bahrain island, the Shia formed 70% and Sunnis 30% (the estimate for Muharraq island is missing - Lorimer's estimate for Bahrain island alone is roughly 60% Shia and 40% Sunnis). The other estimate was by the British Political Agent in 1922 in which he estimated the population of Bahrain at 150,000 and stated that Shia formed the majority. In one of their petitions in 1923, Baharnah leaders estimated the number of Shia at 60,000. According to the 1941 census, which was the first in Bahrain's history, Shia formed 52% of the population and Sunnis formed 48%. The census found that the total population of Bahrain at time was about 90,000. The population of Manama was about 28,000 and Muharraq 21,500. Mahdi Al-Tajir stated that the latter census was not reliable, because many rural Baharnah refrained from recording their names.) The largest city, Manama had 25,000 inhabitants (60% Shia and 40% Sunni), about 7,500 of them were foreigners. (Note: Foreigners belonged to the following nationalities/ethnicities: Africans (2300), Persians (1,550), Hasawis (1,000), Qatifis (500), Najdis (500), Iraqis (250), Indians (190), Kuwaitis (150), Jews (50), Americans (6) and Europeans (4). Also, there were 1,000 Arabs "of various or uncertain origin".) The inhabitants of Muharraq numbered 20,000. Bahrainis constituted 17,250 of them (5% Shia and 95% Sunni), while the remaining were foreigners. The majority of the rural population were Shia. The Sunni component was composed of the Al Khalifa family and its tribal allies who migrated to Bahrain in the late eighteenth century, and the Huwala who formed the largest segment of this component. (Note: The Huwala state that they are of Arab descent and that their ancestors left Arabia for the Persian littoral of the Persian Gulf before returning to the Arabian littoral. They are referred to as "Sunni Persians" in British documents. Despite being numerous, the Huwala were not politically influential and their importance was mainly commercial.) The Shia community was mostly composed of Baharnah (sing. Bahrani), who were the oldest group that still inhabited the island. Baharnah were also the largest single community, followed by Huwala. (Note: Baharnah are thought to be descendants of Abd al-Qays tribe who had lived in Bahrain since the second century (AD). One British official referred to them as "the mass of the people of Bahrain". Like the Huwala, the Baharnah were not politically influential.) The other Shia group is Persians, who formed a small minority.

=== Political system ===
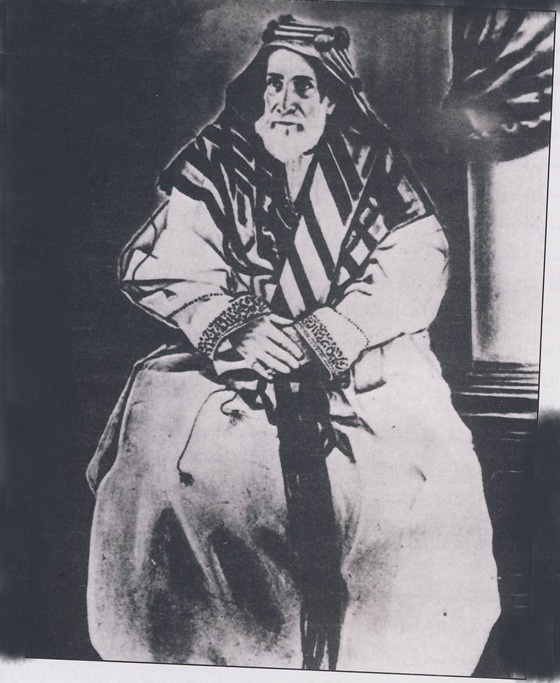
Shaikh Isa ibn Ali Al Khalifa, the ruler of Bahrain (1869–1923)

Following the end of internal conflicts and external threats in 1869, the tribal rule in Bahrain was stabilized. (Note: The word "tribe" does not mean nomads. All tribes in Bahrain were settled (with the exception of Al Nuaim and Ka'ban tribes) and had very different lifestyles from nomads. Also, the British Political Resident stated that "there [were] no real 'tribes' worthy of the name in Bahrain". Based on this, Mahdi Al-Tajir preferred to refer to them as "the tribal element".) According to Bahraini historian Khayri, during the first 20 years of Shaikh Isa's rule, authority was centralized. However, in 1889, after the death of his brother, Shaikh Ahmed, authority began to be distributed. The system resembled a "feudal estate system" in which authority was shared with different groups whose power was dependent on their economic resources. Authority was shared between various Al Khalifa Shaikhs, that Shaikh Isa could not control all of their actions. Also, the Al Khalifa also served as landlords; on one hand, the lands they directly administered were farmed out as fiefs and on the other they collected taxes on private lands. Land was divided into a number of fiefdoms which were administered by close relatives of the ruler, each of them enjoying a high level of autonomy within it, almost as high as the ruler himself. (Note: Khuri described these rulers as "the 'government' without offices, the 'administration' without bureaucracy [and] the 'state' without public delegation or consent, standardized law or equity". One British official referred to these rulers as "petty tyrants".)

Within his fiefdom, each ruler had the authority to claim corvée (i.e. forced labor, known locally as sukhrah), collect taxes and resolve contentions. He was helped in conducting these tasks by three main administrative staff: fidawis, wazirs and kikhdae. The former was the military arm of the authority whose main job was to execute rulers orders via physical coercion. They were led by a number of Amirs who were appointed by the ruler. Fidawis were composed of Baluchis, African slaves and Sunni Arabs whose tribal origin could not be traced.

Fidawis collected taxes, rents and tributes from cities, were responsible for rounding up adult males for forced labor and had powers to arrest, interrogate and punish. Their arbitrary way of taking the law into their hands and use of violence were a source of terror throughout Bahrain, especially to the Baharnah. In the 1920s, many complaints by reform supporters were concerned with fidawis. The other two staff, kikhdae and wazirs were tax collectors in villages and proxies for renting palm gardens respectively. They belonged to the Baharna, were wealthy and had a leading position in society, but in villages that were heavily taxed they were so hated that they escaped to Manama following reforms of the 1920s.

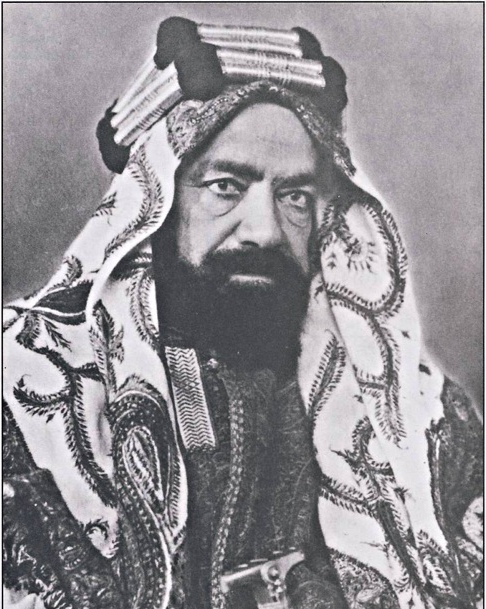
Shaikh Hamad ibn Isa Al Khalifa, the heir apparent and elder son of Shaikh Isa

The ruler, Shaikh Isa ibn Ali Al Khalifa was distinguished from the other Al Khalifa by the larger amount of resources he controlled; he had the cities of Muharraq and Manama as well as many fiefdoms under his control. He held absolute powers; he was described as an "autocrat" who "could order collective punishment of [a] village", especially if it was a Shia one. He regularly gave away entire villages as gifts to other Al Khalifas. He ruled from Muharraq, except for the summer months when he moved to Manama. His main source of income was from customs. Other sources of income included agricultural and inheritance transfer taxes. He also ruled over markets and ports, and treated all public revenues as private earnings. Much of the revenue was spent on his retinue and so little or none at all on infrastructure, and when it occurred, it was thought of as an act of charity. (Note: The British estimated Shaikh Isa's expenses in 1905 at Rs. 300,000. He spent them as follows: 33% personal (including fidawis salaries), 33% Al Khalifa allowances, 19% "subsidies and presents to bedouin", 10% special expenses and 5% on administration.)

The heir apparent was the oldest son of Shaikh Isa, Shaikh Hamad, appointed in the position in 1896. However, the younger son, Shaikh Abdulla was Shaikh Isa's "trusted agent". Shaikh Khalid, the younger brother of Shaikh Isa was the governor of Riffa. He also controlled Sitra island, Nabih Saleh and was dependent for his income on the poll tax, exclusively levied on Baharnah. Shaikh Khalid was the most independent fief overlord. Authority-related jobs were exclusive to the Sunnis whereas market-related were confined to Baharnah and foreigners.

=== Economy ===
The main economic resources back then, pearl diving, fishing and palm farming were administered by tribal councils, with Shaikh Isa's council being the most influential. Most fishing trap owners and palm farmers were Baharna, who formed the lowest layer of the social strata. They were the only group which had to pay a number of taxes including, but not limited to: poll tax (also known as neck tax and ragbiyyah, levied on Baharnah males), water tax, fish tax and Muharram tax. (Note: These taxes were not imposed on all Baharna; exemption included two groups: those who worked in Al Khalifa directly-controlled-gardens and those that offered tribute and services to Al Khalifa. Many people from Sitra and A'ali belonged to the aforementioned group, while the villages of Diraz and Bani Jamra were heavily taxed, because they "offered little tribute".) Most lands were seized by Al Khalifa and Baharnah farmers had to rent them. (Note: A British official stated that Al Khalifa owned 67% of palm gardens, almost all of them confiscated during the reign of Shaikh Isa. He also noted that only a small minority of them were obtained by legal means. Abdulhadi Khalaf stated that "seizure of cultivated land and fisheries" took place after 1870.) Some Baharnah families who were allied to the Al Khalifa were allowed to keep their lands, but were required to pay a heavy land tax. Even this latter group was not spared from occasional confiscation of land for "no valid reason".

Palm farming was the only source of subsistence for many Baharnah families which were always left with no more than the essentials of survival, because rents were dependent on yield, increasing and decreasing with it. Those who failed to pay rents were "summarily evicted from their homes and in some cases [were] beaten and imprisoned as well". They also had to look after the cattle of the rulers and provide food to any Al Khalifa that passes by. They were subject to attacks by bedouins and Al Khalifa, were subjected to corvée and their women were "apt to be molested". The conditions of Baharnah were described to be "little better than landless serfs" and "virtually serfs". British officials described Baharnah peasants as "shamefully rack-rented peasantry" and "their condition resembled that of helots, who could call no lands nor the produce of any land their own". (Note: Rural Baharnah were the main sufferers, while those who lived in Manama suffered less, and those in Muharraq almost not at all. The sufferings endured by Baharnah during this period are still alive in the folklore and were resurrected by the Shia opposition throughout the 1980s and 1990s. Nader Kadhim stated that until the 2000s, whenever one mentions this topic, the Baharnah -regardless if they were rural or urban- would react "as if these oppressions were happening today".)

On the other hand, pearl diving was controlled by Sunni Arab tribesmen, who had their own estates, enjoyed a high level of autonomy and freedom of operation within them, and were not directly taxed. Only few Baharnah were engaged in this occupation. (Note: According to Khuri, pearl diving was taxed indirectly via the export tax, which was variable, unlike the fixed 5 percent import tax. Mahdi Al-Tajir however stated that there was no export tax, but an ad valorem tax of 10 percent on pearl catch that is worth Rs. 10,000 or more. Khuri stated that Al Khalifa's tight control over Baharnah and relaxed measures over Sunnis was not due to sectarian discrimination, instead he argued it was due to economic reasons. Louër supported the aforementioned statement, explaining that "land tenure was only profitable for the Al Khalifa as long as the cultivators were tied to them by taxes and rental fees. On the other hand, the pearling tribes, if not granted maximum freedom of organization, would have left for other pearling centers like Qatar or Dubai, which would have been damaging for the Al Khalifa as they would lack a source of tax revenue". Al Sha'er and Jassim compared the oppression of Baharnah with that of divers and argued that both of them were a type of class struggle, not motivated by sectarianism and that such horrible acts were common back then in other countries. Hashim however, stated that these policies were motivated by sectarianism. He also wrote that Baharnah "composed the backbone of the labour force... in the pearl industry".) The most powerful tribe was Al Dawasir who lived in Budaiya and Zallaq; they were wealthy, numerous and only second in power to Al Khalifa; they had 400 manpower, while the total manpower of Al Khalifa was 540. They had a pearling fleet and many divers. They were allied to other tribes residing in Eastern Arabia. When Al Dawasir migrated to Bahrain from central Arabia in 1845, they expelled the Baharnah living in the north west side of the island. In the years preceding administrative reforms, they had stopped paying the diving tax, which used to be "small" and paid in "reduced form". Shaikh Isa "was too nervous of Ibn Saud's intervention to insist on them". Charles Belgrave described them as "fine-looking men, tall, handsome and arrogant, and they terrorized the villages in the neighborhood". Al Hidd was also an important pearl center. It was controlled by Al Khalifa.

Pearl diving produced enormous amounts of cash and recruited a large portion of the population (up to 70% of working males). The annual pearl export increased by 700% between 1873 and 1900. It was the pillar of Bahraini economy. The pearling boat captain, known as Nakhuda was of tribal origin, while the crew were mostly non-Bahraini. (Note: They were mainly southern Persians, Baluchis, Africans, Omanis and coastal Arabs.) The crew, which had to endure hard work and face hazards of the sea only received a small part of the share, while merchants and Nakhudas got most of it. A special court, known as the salifa presided over matters relating to pearling.

Salifa was always headed by a judge of tribal origin and was biased in favor of merchants and Nakhudas, who were also of tribal origin. At the beginning and end of each diving season, the Nakhuda would give loans to the crew. These loans were very important for the diver's family during and after the season. Loan interests were very high and increased with pearl catch, thus the crew were almost always in debt to the Nakhuda. Because debts were hereditary from fathers to sons and brothers, most divers (90%) were stuck in the system. This system was described by one British official as "a form of slavery". Another described it as "bondage and oppression" and "like slavery", especially for older people, who had to work despite getting physically weaker. (Note: Debts were almost always more than divers' earnings. Also, the Nakhuda charged divers exaggerated fees for food during the season and often sold pearls at higher price than told to them. While in the season, the Nakhuda acted as the judge and executioner on the boat. One author gave the following description of the pearl industry: "The diver is known as a slave for the rest of his life. It is probably easier for a Negro slave on the Pirate Coast [Persian Gulf] to escape, than it is for a Bahraini diver to regain his freedom. As long as he is in debt he cannot change his employer, no matter how badly he is treated, nor can he leave the town, except under bonds to return before the diving season begins and he will never be able to get out of debt, he cannot read or write, there is no witness to the transactions that take place between the captain and himself It is the recognised thing for the divers to receive a loan of rice ... The sum written into the books is regularly about 50% greater than the market value of the rice. If necessary entirely are required, false entries are written in. The upshot of the matter is that their men never get out of debt, not one in a thousand of them. In seven years residence in Bahrain, I have never yet met a diver who had escaped from the account book, as the Arab put it".) In 1913, many drivers went to sea without Nakhudas. The latter, especially those who belonged to Al-Dawasir tribe complained to Shaikh Isa, who sent orders to the divers to return immediately.

Merchants were influential and their elites played an important role in the sustainability of the tribal regime. Their financial power was often superior to that of the ruler. Tribal merchants, who monopolized the pearl industry were at the top of the hierarchy, while Baharnah merchants were the lowest. The latter merchants acted mainly as middlemen for pearl trade and were known as tawawish. They were vulnerable to "arbitrary dispossession and extortion" as can be seen from the case of Ahmad bin Khamis. (Note: Ahmad bin Khamis was a notable Baharnah merchant. In 1909, he made Rs. 44,000 profit from selling pearls. Shaikh Isa demanded Rs. 10,000, but Khamis refused. He was arrested and only released after he agreed to pay Rs. 6,000. He was also involved in 2 incidents with Shaikh Abdulla. He reported that in 1917, Shaikh Abdulla had ordered him tied for three days in the "burning summer sun without water or food" for refusing to give him Rs. 6,000. He said that he was released after friends of him paid the money. In September 1920, the Political Agent (Dickson) reported that Khamis had sought refuge at the agency after Shaikh Abdulla had ordered him arrested again. The reason behind this incident was that Khamis had bought a valuable pearl from the mainland and Shaikh Abdulla wanted to tax it. Khamis however, refused to pay the tax, because according to him it only applied to pearl catch within Bahrain. Several other merchants from different backgrounds unanimously agreed with Khamis, but Shaikh Abdulla refused to give up what he considered a customary right levied by "all the Shaikhs' sons" on the "accursed Shiahs" exclusively. Although he was annoyed that Khamis had sought British protection and that they have provided it, Shaikh Isa agreed to pardon Khamis after the agent intervened. Baharnah "hailed the outcome as a victory for justice". Bahraini journalist Mansoor al-Jamri referred to Khamis as the first political asylum seeker in the history of Bahrain.) Huwala merchants, while not enjoying the same privileges as tribal merchants had strong transnational networks that were sometimes reinforced by connections to the British Agency. The Huwala elite merchants such as Yusuf Kanoo and Yusuf Fakhro were exempt from import-export tax by Shaikh Isa, despite the large amount of commodities they dealt with.

=== Judiciary ===
Another informal court existed, known as al-Majlis al-Urfi (Customary council) which was concerned with commercial disputes. Shaikh Isa appointed members of both courts. Criminal and civil cases were dealt with by the Al Khalifa-controlled tribal councils, where customary law was applied. Religious matters were dealt with by religious courts which followed Sharia (Islamic law), derived from the Qur'an and Hadith. Appointed by Shaikh Isa, Jassim al-Mihza was the sole jurist that served the Sunni community. (Note: Jassim al-Mihza was also known as Qassim al-Mihza.) The Shia courts on the other hand were numerous and independent of the ruler. Shia jurists had tremendous social power, controlled the numerous Shia endowment properties and represented an alternative to the government as their followers looked upon them as the "legitimate" authority. The few European traders were under British jurisdiction. At some points, the British extended their jurisdiction over Bahrainis as well, but this was rare prior to 1904.

== Increasing British protection ==
In 1903, Lord Curzon, then the Viceroy of India visited Bahrain and highlighted the need to reform the customs -which were in a state of chaos- by appointing a British director. (Note: Customs was run by an Indian firm and accounts were in Sindhi language. Big merchants were only required to pay a small fee, while small merchants were "weighted heavily". One British Official thought it was so disorganized that he compared it with Augean Stables. The British point of view was that appointing a British director was not only "the best way to regularize customs", but was also a way to strengthen British control over Bahrain without direct rule, which would have provoked the Persians and Ottomans. It could also help them curb the trade of arms and slaves.) The ruler, Shaikh Isa resisted what he considered an interference, after which Curzon told him they were persistent in their demands. Complaints about the customs were made as early as 1885 and remained a popular topic for British officials until the implementation of the administrative reforms in the 1920s. Throughout this period, Shaikh Isa resisted British control over customs in order to remain financially independent. In 1904, the post of British Assistant was elevated to British Political Agent.

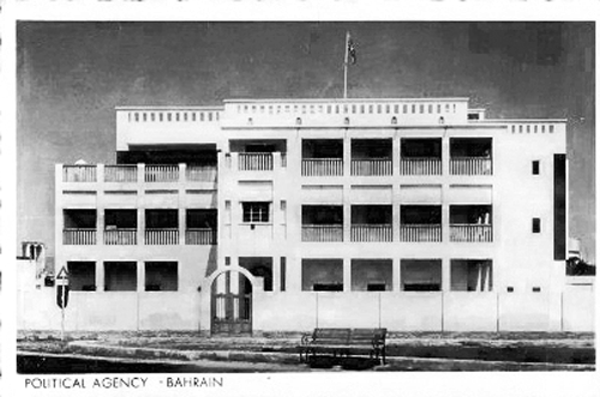
The British political agency, circa 1900

On 29 September 1904, followers of Ali ibn Ahmed Al Khalifa, a nephew of Shaikh Isa attacked clerks working for a German trading firm. Ali himself attacked the German trader. On 14 November, his followers attacked and severely injured several Persians. The Political Agent asked Shaikh Isa to punish the aggressors and compensate the victims, but Shaikh Isa refused. After failing to get justice in Bahrain, the victimized parties referred their cases to the German Council in Bushire and the Persian Secretary for Foreign Affairs respectively.

Fearing that these incidents would allow foreign powers to "gain an opening for assailing [the British] regime", Major Percy Cox, the Acting Political Resident in the Persian Gulf visited Bahrain in a navy fleet on 30 November 1904. (Note: He was the Political Resident between 1905 and 1913, was appointed as High commissioner for Mesopotamia, Foreign Secretary of India and Minister to Persia.) Shaikh Isa agreed to punish those behind the attack on the German firm, but not those who attacked the Persians. After consultations with higher British authorities, Cox returned to Bahrain in a great show of force on 23 February 1905. He issued an ultimatum ending on 25 February. Cox demanded deporting Ali, compensating the Persians, prohibiting forced labor of foreigners, and adhering to advises by the British Political Agent. He threatened to fire on Manama if Shaikh Isa did not comply.

Shaikh Isa agreed to the demands on 26 February 1905 after Cox had fired few blank shots on Manama. (Note: Although Shaikh Isa had submitted to Cox's demands in 1905, he only acknowledged them officially in 1909.) In secret however, he allegedly warned Ali against his inevitable arrest. Finding that Ali was gone, Cox took the heir apparent, Shaikh Hamad as a hostage, imposed house arrest on Shaikh Isa and confiscated Ali's properties. He then arrested Jassim al-Mihza, the influential Sunni judge. Three days later, Cox was satisfied with the results as the population submitted to the British. (Note: Littlefield wrote that this incident "was reported to have left a profound impression on the people".) Shaikh Hamad and al-Mihza were released and Shaikh Isa was freed from house arrest. Ali surrendered himself in July and was deported to Bombay in September.

In January 1906, Cox extended the jurisdiction of the British Political Agent to Persians when he ruled that a Persian who was caught stealing from a British ship harbored in Bahrain fell under British jurisdiction. In April, the British further extended their jurisdiction to include Jews and native Christians after the former group complained of harassment over taxes by Shaikh Isa. According to one British official, all these judicial powers were "not authorized by any law".

The full implications of these actions were not realized at first. Because all "foreigners" were placed under the British jurisdiction, an often-conflicted dual authority system was created, one led by the ruler, the other by the British Political Agency. During the time, there was an increasing number of foreigners due to the pearl boom which was coupled with stability. At the same time, the term "foreigner" lacked a precise definition; both Shaikh Isa and the British claimed non-Bahraini Arabs and Baharnah as their subjects. (Note: By 1911, all foreign groups, including non-Bahraini Arabs were under British jurisdiction.) Shaikh Isa's motivations were political as well as financial, as he charged 10% of all cases fees. Shaikh Isa's reaction to this change was to postpone any reform to the customs which he thought of as "the darlings of British trade".

The British attempted to use this atmosphere to their advantage; Captain Prideaux, the newly appointed Political Agent had been developing plans for administrative reforms. Unlike other British officials, he did not suggest changes in the customs or internal authority of Al Khalifa. Instead Prideaux proposed that reforms be focused on "ending local tyranny" in the form of forced labor, and judicial and financial corruption. His proposals were the basis of the Bahrain Order in Council, a document issued in 1913 that secured the legal status of Britain in Bahrain. At first, these plans were rejected by Cox, who thought they were premature. British officials thought that by 1908 Shaikh Isa would be forced to accept reforms in the customs due to the expiration of Banyan merchants contracts. However, in January 1908, the customs revenue increased when Shaikh Isa appointed local officials.

== Bahrain Order in Council and WWI ==
Before late 1907, the British have not openly declared Bahrain a protectorate, instead they considered it under their protection. The Foreign Office refused to use "strict terms" to define the status of Bahrain. But in private correspondents between British officials, the term "protectorate" was often used since the 1890s. (Note: One of the first uses of the term dates to November 1892. In 1898, the British Political Resident stated that "the status of Bahrein towards the British Government of India is identical with that of protected Native States of India".) On 14 November 1907, the British Government of India requested issuing an Order in Council for Bahrain in light of the growing British jurisdiction over foreigners. Rising foreign interests and trade in the region, especially those of the Germans was another important motivation. In the request, the Government of India acknowledged that treatment of 1880 had turned Bahrain into "a sort of protectorate".

In February 1908, the Foreign Office questioned if administrative reforms can be carried out along with formally acknowledging the increased British jurisdiction over Bahrain, so that the latter may not provoke any hostile reactions from other foreign powers. In March, a committee headed by John Morley, the Secretary of State for India was formed. It concluded in its final report that Bahrain was in fact a British "visual Protectorate" (but did not see fit to declare it publicly as so) and that the Order in Council should be issued following written consent from Shaikh Isa over the new status of British jurisdiction over foreigners. The report was approved in February 1909 and the Government of India was tasked on May with preparing a draft for the Order in Council. Shaikh Isa's consent was secured in July, however for various reasons, the draft was only submitted in June 1911. Further negotiations with Shiakh Isa and the Ottomans delayed the approval of the Order in Council until 12 August 1913.

The Bahrain Order in Council (BOIC) was published in The London Gazette on 15 August 1911. (Note: The publication at this time was by mistake and it was only published in India in February 1915. This prompted criticism from British authorities in the Persian Gulf who wanted to delay it due to fears of the Ottomans negative reaction. Shaikh Isa continued to resist British jurisdiction over non-Bahrainis.) It provided legal cover for British jurisdiction over foreigners. It also limited the powers of the ruler and gave the Political Agent far reaching jurisdiction powers, including on religious law courts. John Marlowe stated that this had equated Bahrain's status to a British Colony and the British Political Resident's power to a Colonial Governor. Littlefield wrote the BOIC had made Bahrain "in all but name, a British colony" and that it aroused anti-British feelings. Six courts were to be formed: the Chief Court (Muslims), the District Court (foreigners), the Joint Court (Bahrainis vs foreigners), al-Majlis al-Urfi (only when disputing parties agreed to refer to it), Salifa Court (pearl diving) and Kazi's Court (cases could be referred to it from other courts). The applicable law was to be Indian law with some amendments. However, the BOIC was suspended due to negotiations with Ottomans and outbreak of the First World War. It was only put into effect in February 1919, announcing the start of the administrative reforms.

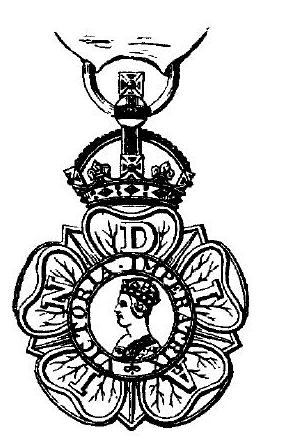
The insignia of the Most Eminent Order of the Indian Empire

Few months before the war, Bahrain granted Britain exclusive oil concessions. During the war, most Bahrainis were not supportive to the Allies. The British thought this was due to their (the British) lack of attention toward Baharnah oppression and suspension of reforms. (Note: Littlefield wrote that since the year 1917, there was an attitude of misgovernment and Baharnah mistreatment.) These anti-British feelings were another reason for delaying implementation of the Oder in Council until after the war. On the other hand, Shaikh Isa and his family, especially his younger son, Shaikh Abdulla were loyal to the British. (Note: With the exception of one attempt by Shaikh Isa to contact the Ottomans.) Shaikh Isa was given the Companion (CIE) and Knight Commander (KCIE) of the Order of the Indian Empire in 1915 and 1919 respectively. Shaikh Abdulla too was given CIE in 1915.

The situation within Bahrain was calm, but very hard at the same time; the customs income decreased by 80%, 5,000 died due to plague in Manama and Muharraq, and many others migrated. Many were brought to the "brink of famine" due to India's ban on exporting rice and the subsequent increase in staple commodities prices. Shaikh Isa responded in 1917 by borrowing from merchants, increasing the customs tax and dispossessing of Baharna, who were now the only non-Sunni group which did not enjoy British protection. At the time, Britain responded to external threats from the Wahhabis, Ottomans and Persians by tightening its grip over Bahrain. The latter two had longstanding claims over the island. Following the end of the war, Persian media launched a campaign calling for a stop to the oppressive policies against their co-religious Shia. By the end of the war, the Persian Gulf became "a British lake", as all enemies of Britain were defeated and its control was therefore left unchallenged. This marked a shift in the British policy in Bahrain toward more intervention in the island's internal affairs.

== Timeline of reforms ==
=== Captain Bray ===
The administrative reforms took place between 1919 and 1927. (Note: Khalaf stated that reforms took place during the period of 1914–32.) In November 1918, Captain N. N. E. Bray was appointed as Political Agent in Bahrain and instructed to "seek the amelioration of the internal government by indirect and pacific means and by gaining the confidence and trust of the shaikh". He was the first of three British officials to the post who were educated about "Arabic language, culture, and society." This change in British policy was previously resisted by the Foreign Office and Government of India which preferred a "cautions policy". On 27 January 1919, the British Secretary of State telegrammed the Government of India that the BOIC was to be commenced on 3 February. Bray was notified and he proceeded to inform Shaikh Isa on 1 February. Shaikh Isa simply acknowledged he had been notified about the BOIC without giving a positive or negative opinion, despite being given 2 days to consider. During these 2 days, Bray secured the approval of al-Mihza, the sole Sunni jurist. On 3 February, Bray announced to the public that BOIC was effective.

Bray's first step to implement the BOIC was to appoint half members of the al-Majlis al-Urfi. On 2 April 1919, Shaikh Isa sacked one of the aforementioned members without consulting with Bray. The latter protested against this move, as it was a breach of the BOIC. No compromise was reached as Shaikh Isa considered it his right as ruler to appoint members of al-Majlis al-Urfi. As a result, meetings of the al-Majlis al-Urfi were upheld indefinitely. Bray wrote that there were growing anti-British feelings in Bahrain for various reasons. He suggested forming a pro-British party to counter them.

In May 1919, Bray was to leave to London. He invited Shaikh Abdulla, the second son of Shaikh Isa from another wife to accompany him as a reward for his help during World War I and in order to learn about modern administration. Shaikh Abdulla however used the opportunity to mail Arthur Hirtzel, the Deputy Under Secretary of State for India when he arrived in London in September. He demanded among other things that his father's jurisdiction powers be restored to those prior to 1904. He signed the memorandum: "Abdulla bin Isa — The Successor". He never delivered Shaikh Hamad's letter to King George V. After his return, Shaikh Abdulla opened al-Hidaya al-Khalifiyah, the first modern school in Bahrain and appointed an Egyptian, Haffez Wahbah as head.

=== Major Dickson ===
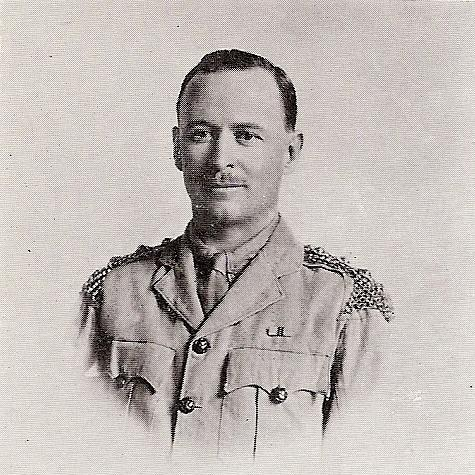
Major Harold Richard Patrick Dickson (4 February 1881 – 14 June 1959)

In November 1919, Major H. R. P. Dickson was appointed as Political Agent. His fluent Arabic and visits to their villages allowed him to establish strong relationships with Baharnah peasants, who told him about their grievances. Dickson encouraged them to rise against the tribal administration and promised that tyranny would end and that he would help them. He described Baharnah as "pro-British". He also strengthened his communication with the people by holding an Arab-style regular Majlis. Dickson stated that "British prestige rested on fear and not respect". In one of his reports, he described the political situation as "wholly unsatisfactory" with deep "anti-British sentiment". In the same report, he divided influential Bahrainis into "while list" and "black list", and the opposition into "honest" and "dishonest". In another report he listed the five most influential Bahrainis: Shaikh Isa, his wife, (Note: She is the mother of Shaikh Abdulla. One British official described her as "a masterful person, and has the greatest influence on Shaikh Essa. This lady holds a regular court, and imprisons and punishes at will, with total disregard for the most elementary laws of even Arab justice".) Shaikh Hamad, Shaikh Abdulla and Jasim al-Shirawi.

Dickson was annoyed by Shaikh Isa's repeated talk of Wilson's Fourteen Points statement (he referred to it as "utterances") on the right of self-determination and independence of small nations. Dickson once requested that a British warship be occasionally sent to Bahrain in order to impress Shaikh Isa and "keep [British] prestige alive among a set of people who are only too apt to forget that the British Empire exists and does take an interest in Bahrain affairs". Shaikh Isa was also hostile to Dickson; the judges he appointed avoided any contact with Dickson and his fidawis prevented foreigners from contacting the agency, thus hindering the flow of intelligence.

Dickson agreed with Shaikh Isa to resume the meetings of al-Majlis al-Urfi for six months to give time for the reply of the British Government. The first meeting was held in January 1920 with 10 members, half of them were Bahrainis appointed by Shaikh Isa and the other half were Persians and Indians appointed by Dickson. One of the latter group was Mohammed Sharif, who would play a more important role later. The court was given rule over trade, including pearl industry. It replaced the tribal salifa court in later years.

In May 1920, the Government of India sent reply to Shaikh Abdulla's earlier letter, rejecting all of his demands, except that of jurisdiction over non-Bahraini Arabs, on the condition that other Arab rulers agree. Dickson spared no time before contacting rulers of Saudi Arabia and Qatar regarding the matter. After getting their replies, in which they refused to give Bahrain jurisdiction over their subjects, (Note: Previously, in 1913, Ibn Saud had agreed to place his subjects under the jurisdiction of Shaikh Isa. Since then and until April 1920, the matter of jurisdiction over Saudis was a point of contention between Shaikh Isa and the Political Agent, each of them claiming jurisdiction over them.) Dickson announced in November that foreign subjects were under British protection. (Note: Al-Rumaihi stated that Dickson's announced that all foreign subjects were under British protection, including non-Bahraini Arabs from countries which he did not contact. Mahdi Al-Tajir however stated that Dickson was specific in which foreigners were entitled to British protection, but that Shaikh Isa withheld the notice from the public.)

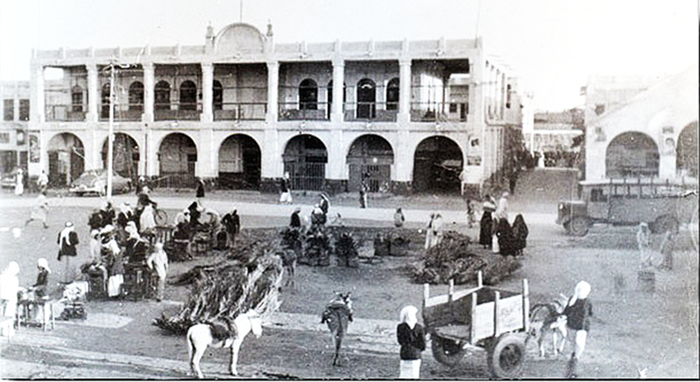
Municipality of Manama

Dickson introduced two modern institution. The first was the Joint Court in 1919 headed by him and Shaikh Abdulla and concerned with cases of foreigners against Bahrainis. On 1 July, a Municipal Council (municipality) was formed in Manama with Shaikh Abdulla as head. Half of its 8 members were appointed by Shaikh Isa and the other half by Political Agent, and it was tasked with civil responsibilities. (Note: Such as "public hygiene, transportation, traffic, water, and electricity.") Fidawis were abolished and replaced by a small group of municipal guards. The opening session of the municipality witnessed a large demonstration against it. Dickson was dissatisfied with the proceedings of the municipality and accused Shaikh Abdulla and his Indian secretary of monopolizing decision-making. He introduced a new set of decision-making by-laws based on majority vote and appointed himself as ex officio member. (Note: Dickson's justification for this intervention was that he wanted to make sure of members' attendance and performance, and to provide them with ink and paper in case Shaikh Isa overlooked them.)

Dickson also provided protection to some Bahraini women, which Al Dawasir powerful tribe saw as "humiliating and hurtful to their pride". These policies earned Dickson the enmity of the ruler, his son Abdulla, the tribes and Sunnis in general (conservatives and enlightened). The former two, along with other ruling Shaikhs resented Dickson, because of his interference in their traditional absolute authority, while the latter were motivated by local morals and nationalism. This opposition was translated into petitions sent to higher British offices and efforts to render the newly established offices inoperative. Petitions were mainly prepared by Haffez Wahbah, Jasim al-Shirawi and Abdul Wahab al-Zayani. On the other hand, foreigners and the Baharnah were supportive of the reforms. The former group felt safe under British protection and to them the reforms represented an organized regime. While the latter group had been longtime oppressed by the Al Khalifa and were agitated for liberty.

=== Major Daly ===
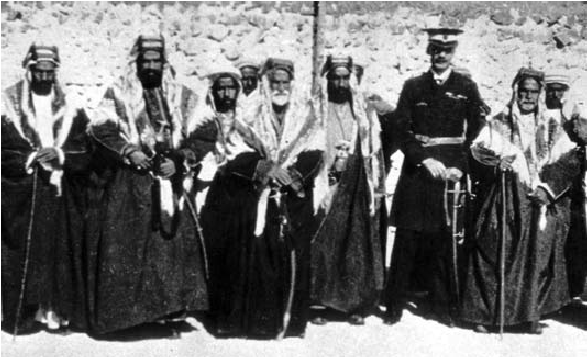
Shaikh Isa with his family and the British Political Agent, Major Daly.

Dickson was relieved from duty at the end of 1920, (Note: Dickson opponents attribute this to their petitions against him, while Daly said it was due to personal causes.) which brought his opponents a short relief that was soon interpreted by his successor, Major Clive Kirkpatrick Daly. (Note: Daly had unsuccessful attempted to implement administrative reforms in Iraq during the 1918–20 Iraqi revolt against the British. Ameen Rihani wrote that Daly was demoted from Lt. Col. to Major due to his role in the revolt. Daly is reported by Rihani to have instigated the revolt after beating a tribal chief in Al Diwaniyah. The aforementioned statement is said by Mai Al Khalifa to be supported by accounts of Gertrude Bell and Ali Al-Wardi. Al-Rumaihi mentioned that Daly was the Political Governor of Al Diwaniyah where the revolt began. Daly was described by St John Philby as "one of [the] toughest men" in Iraq. This reputation grew further in Bahrain that up to the 1970s, Bahrainis referred to unnegotiable orders as "Daly planned". At least two other sayings common in Bahrain are also attributed to Daly. Khuri described him as "insistently tough, uncompromising, and power-minded." Molly Izzard wrote in 1979 that Daly was "still remembered and still disliked".) Prior to the arrival of Daly in January 1921, the position of the Political Agent was temporarily filled by an Indian assistant. During this period, the influence of the Agency became very low. Daly's first priority was to restore the Agency's power. He spoke fluent Arabic and had attended Shia religious classes in Iraq. During the first few months of his arrival in Bahrain, Daly did not purse reforms. He refused to provide protection to individuals and turned a blind eye to the tribal administration persecution and killing of Baharnah peasants whom Dickson had promised with salvation. Mohammed Al Tajir mentioned that the British Political Agency silence was the main motivation for continuation of oppression of Baharnah and described Daly's attitude as "trickery". Shaikh Isa was satisfied with Daly and sent a letter to the British Political Resident requesting his permanent fixation after rumors spread that Daly was getting transferred. (Note: This is in contrast with Shaikh Isa's warning to Daly against interfering in the internal affairs of Bahrain when he first arrived.)

Few months later, Daly targeted supporters of Shaikh Abdulla by sacking or deporting them, among them were Haffez Wahbah and Jasim al-Shirawi. (Note: The BOIC allowed Daly to deport foreigners under certain conditions. Wahbah was Egyptian, but Shirawi (who was an Arab nationalist) belonged to a known Bahraini family. Daly claimed Shirawi was a Persian and that his last name was Shirazi (from Shiraz, Persia). Wahbah deportation was done in agreement with Shaikh Isa.) Shaikh Abdulla represented "the symbol of tribal power", was supported by the tribes and was more influential than his elder brother, the heir apparent Shaikh Hamad. Shaikh Abdulla had ambitions to succeed his father in throne. Daly removed Shaikh Abdulla from the Joint Court and Municipality Council and placed Shaikh Hamad instead. (Note: Al-Rumaihi reported that Shaikh Abdulla had resigned after Daly repeatedly "harassed" him.) He also appointed Shaikh Hamad as manager of public business, a move made in agreement with Shaikhs Isa and Abdulla. Daly then appointed a Persian merchant, Mohammed Sharif (Note: Al-Rumaihi described Sharif as "Daly's confident", Fuccaro described him as "the self—appointed defender of Persian interests" and Mohammed Al-Tajir said he was known for his hate of Arabs. Al-Rumaihi reported that Sharif's recruitment of Persians in the guards force had "added fuel to the flames". Daly however, stated that Sharif was a Sunni who "has no sympathy with [Baharnah]".) as secretary of Manama municipality and later as its head. Daly also provided protection to a growing number of individuals, especially the still–oppressed countryside Baharnah who sought to use this new status to voice their demands and grievances. Daly communicated with and organized the Baharnah community via a number of "brokers" (merchants).

By mid 1921, Bahrain was divided into two main camps, the first supporting the reforms composed of Daly, Shaikh Hamad and his supporters (including Sunni jurist al-Mihza), and the Baharnah (urban and peasant). (Note: Although Shaikh Hamad enjoyed the support of Baharna, Daly wrote that "at heart [Shaikh Hamad felt] like all the Al Khalifa, that the Baharnah are there to outraged, fleeced and oppressed".) The opposing faction was composed of Shaikh Isa, his son Abdulla, tribesmen, pearl merchants and Nakhudas. Shaikh Salman, the son of Shaikh Hamad was also opposed to the reforms. The ruling family was divided on the matter. (Note: Mohammad bin Abdul-Rahman bin Abdel-Wahab Al Khalifa was one of those who strongly supported the reforms and were at odds with those who opposed them. He converted to the Shia faith in 1934.) Haffez Wahbah attributed the conflict between Shaikh Isa's sons to the actions of Daly, while Hashim stated it was caused by Shaikh Isa's wife. A series of pro and anti reform petitions were submitted by the two factions to different British officials up to the Foreign Office. On 7 June 1921, a delegation of Baharnah dignitaries submitted a petition to Daly, praising him in a lengthy poem and demanding the enforcement of reforms. The opposing faction petitioned that reforms be reversed and Daly and Shaikh Hamad be dismissed.

The basis of Shaikh Isa's opposition to the reforms was that he did not want to give up the absolute powers he had enjoyed for the past 50 years. Other members of Al Khalifa, such as Shaikh Khalid, the brother of the ruler were dependent for their income on the poll-tax, which the reforms were set to abolish. Another source for Shaikh Khalid's opposition might have been his ambition to hold a senior position if Abdulla was to succeed Shaikh Isa instead of Shaikh Hamad. For tribes and pearl merchants, especially Al Dawasir, the basis of their rejection was that reforms would place them on same footing with other people with regard to taxation and law, thus removing all advantages they had enjoyed. They also saw the reforms as pro-Shia, undermining to their sovereignty and placing them under control of what they called "the British tribe". The basis of Shia's support for reforms was that they saw justice and fair taxation as their rights, especially since they considered themselves the original people of Bahrain. (Note: They considered themselves the original people of Bahrain in contrast with Sunni groups that had arrived at the end of the eighteenth century.)

On 21 December 1921, a group of Baharnah took advantage of the visit of the British Political Resident, Arthur Prescott Trevor in order to raise their grievances. They submitted a petition and told Trevor that should the British fail to persuade Shaikh Isa to accept reforms, then they (the British) should not protect him anymore and allow a new unnamed Arab ruler to be installed. (Note: Schumacher wrote that the Baharnah had made a similar statement in another petition; "If the Great Government is to fail to protect its subjects, let it be known that we may have to resort to some other government such as that of Persia or the like".) The petition also asked to place Baharnah under British protection. It read:

We beg to state to the possessor of great wisdom, the chief of the Gulf, that the Shi'a community is in a state of great humiliation, and subject to public massacre, they have no refuge, the evidence of none of them is accepted [in courts], their properties are subject to plunder, and themselves liable to maltreatment at any moment.

Upon a request by Trevor, Daly submitted a detailed report in which he listed examples of the mismanagement and corruption of the Al Khalifa as well as the "atrocities and oppressions" they had committed. (Note: The list of "crimes against the Shi'i" included the following: "stolen property, rape, abduction, imposition of death duties even though there is no [formal] tax in Bahrain, false seizure of land and houses; increases in rent, forced labor, forced contribution of fowl, eggs [to the ruling family] and commandeering of boats for transport [forced labor], originally a privilege of the ruler alone and now practiced by every cadet of the family and their satellites which now amounts in all to some 150 persons".) He focused on Shaikh Abdulla's attitude towards Shia. (Note: Al-Rumaihi described Shaikh Abdulla as "a notorious rake [who] was involved in many incidents". He further reported that according to Dickson, Ibn Saud described Abdulla as a "snake who steals men's wives". Shiakh Abdulla was "responsible for abusing the Baharnah of Jedhafs and Sanabis".) Prior to the visit, Shaikh Isa had tried and failed to secure Shias' support to his regime. Trevor contacted the Government of India, suggesting more British intervention and temporary deportation of Shaikh Abdulla, who he blamed for the troubles facing the administration of Shaikh Hamad.

In January 1922, he got a negative reply which stated that all local means of pressure should be exhausted before such measures were considered. Trevor was told to visit Bahrain in the near future to let Shaikh Isa know he was being closely monitored. He was also instructed to warn him that "if misrule leads to uprising Government will find it difficult to render him any support whatsoever". Baharnah staged another petition in January without avail. (Note: The petition was presented by 64 Baharnah and read as follows: "After compliments - some time ago we approached the P. R. and you; both verbally and in writing, we informed you of our state. We also sent a petition to Bushire to His Excellency the P. R. We have not yet heard any result, which will pacify our apprehensions and the oppression and tyranny of the rulers increases. Although the whole family of al-Khalifah oppressions (oppresses), yet they are not all alike. Before affairs were in the hands of Shaikh Abdulla and oppression was rife, but when he came to conduct affairs officially, tyranny was practiced to such an extent that matters affecting our honour are not safe (this implies that women folk are not safe) and he even took girls from their houses by force, before their fathers and mothers who could not speak from fear. Now Shaikh Abdulla is not officially conducting affairs, but behind the scenes he continues with his former power, and more and does not relax his efforts. The reason for this is that Shaikh Easa, his father, and his brother like him and assist him in what he wants to do and Shaikh Esa is today no more than a ring on Abdulla's finger. He helps him in whatever he wants. We beg your Excellency to deliver us from the tyranny of Shaikh Abdulla and other oppression. We beg you in the name of the Prophet Jesus to deliver us as soon as possible from the hands of this tyrant. We have no more patience to endure. You are responsible to God for our welfare".) During the same month, several shots were fired on Manama police posts, which were attributed to the opponents of reforms. Recognizing the gravity of the situation, Shaikh Isa sought advice from Daly.

=== Baharnah uprising ===
On 6 February 1922, a group of Baharnah attacked a fidawi who according to Daly had unlawfully beaten and arrested one of their own in Manama. They released the detainee and staged a strike and some protests in Manama Souq that had brought it to a standstill. Mohammed Al Tajir stated that Baharnah strike was instructed by Daly and that it was very effective, because they controlled food and agriculture. He also mentioned that Baharnah were very confident at this time that they "hardened their tone and freely criticized" Shaikh Isa, his family and allies. This incident is referred to by Mahdi Al-Tajir and al-Shehabi as "The Baharnah uprising of February 1922". The uprising was classified by al-Mdaires as the most significant protest by Baharnah during the 1920s, and Matveev said it was "a land mark in the history of Bahrain". Shaikh Isa was "oblivious to the fact that he was sitting on a volcano," Daly wrote. Shaikh Isa contacted Daly regarding the matter, who told him to speak with his subjects and avoid any escalation. On 16 February, a group of Baharnah delegates presented a list of 8 demands to Shaikh Isa. Among the demands were stopping the Shaikh's camels and calves from entering and destroying other's gardens, ending the practice of forced labor and arbitrary arrests.

After 6 days of consultations with his family, Shaikh Isa accepted most of the demands. He however, refused to abolish the poll tax and improve the conditions of prisoners, but promised Baharnah 3 positions in al-Majlis al-Urfi. Shaikh Isa then established a public affairs office and a joint court to look after regular cases, which pacified the situation temporarily. Daly referred to this declaration as "The Magna Carta" and promised to support him in initiating reforms. In private, Daly was skeptical that promised reforms would actually be carried out. On 7 March 1922, Trevor arrived to Bahrain in a warship and delivered separate warnings to Shaikh Isa and his sons Hamad and Abdulla. Prior to the visit, Abdulla had promised Daly to cease his opposition to the reforms. From this point on, Shaikhs Hamad and Abdulla referred to their father's era as "past misrule" and blamed it for current troubles facing them. A period after this, Daly reported that none of the promised reforms were carried out.

During this period, sectarian terminologies and prejudices started appearing, and mistrust between Shias and Sunnis became the norm. (Note: Schumacher questioned if the British role in Bahrain could be blamed for the emergence of sectarianism. She wrote that "[British] categorization [of Bahrain's problems in terms of a single dichotomy] contained an implicit sectarian hue". She further wrote that "[a]s a 'whining' minority group, the Baharnah failed to arouse any sympathy for their plight. As 'Shi'i' the Baharnah threatened to arouse the allegiance of other 'Shi'i' (namely the persians) thereby stirring the British to take their case more seriously".) Baharnah stopped paying taxes after February and Shaikh Hamad had been trying to reach a compromise. However, his uncle, Shaikh Khalid and his sons (known as Al Khawalid) were still insistent on collecting taxes from the Shia. In April 1922, many Baharnah staged a protest at the British Agency. They only left after Shaikhs Hamad and Abdulla had promised that Shaikh Khalid's aggression would stop. The Shaikhs promised to introduce a new fair and nondiscriminatory taxing system. A new taxing system was submitted by Daly to the Shaikhs. They however were afraid that Sunnis would refuse to pay taxes and asked for the backing of British authorities. Daly wrote to higher authorities regarding the matter. Al Dawasir offered Shaikh Hamad their support against Baharnah. He turned them down to avoid losing Baharnah's support, especially at this time.

=== British hesitancy ===
On 2 May 1922, the British Government replied to Daly's request. Its position however was changed with regard to reforms. Back in March they had requested "taking immediate measures for introducing reforms in Bahrain's financial and banking system" whereas by now they did not want any direct interference and only offered moral support. This development had diminished chances for more reforms that Daly wrote in May that "hope for reform have fizzled". In June, Shaikh Abdulla became a supporter of the reforms after reaching a financial reconciliation with his older brother.

The apparent reluctance of British authorities have encouraged the opposing factions to resort to violence in order to end the calls for reform. Al Dawasir visited Ibn Saud in May and July 1922. They gained his support against the reforms. Back in 1913 Ibn Saud had annexed the nearby Al-Hasa to his newly formed theocratic state and may have wanted to use the current disturbances to annex Bahrain as well. He also opposed the reforms on the basis that they might influence the heavily taxed Shia majority in Al Hasa to demand similar rights. They had already tried to escape taxes by migrating to Bahrain, but the Political Agent prevented them in order not to give Ibn Saud an excuse for direct intervention in Bahrain. In light of these developments, Daly decided to wait and see what they come down to. Daly viewed Al Dawasir as the main obstacle to reforms. In July, Daly wrote that Baharnah themselves were divided; those who used peaceful means to support reforms were disappointed, others were stocking weapons and calling for outright revolution if the situation worsened. He wrote again in December that "[pressure for reforms may] have lapsed indefinitely".

On 7 December 1922, the Foreign Office decided to take action in light of the Persian media campaigns against their policy in Bahrain. Persian newspapers had accused Britain of overlooking the oppression of Shia in Bahrain. (Note: Allegations also included mistreatment of Persians by Daly and discrimination against Persians in favor of Najdis. The Persian media campaigns prompted the Persian Parliament to issue and approve a motion to give Bahrain a seat in the Parliament in May 1923. According to Al-Rumaihi, this probably made the British more determined to carry out the reforms. The latter view is supported by a statement made by L. B. H. Haworth, the British Political Resident in 1927, in which he stated that British intervention in Bahrain was a result of Persia's complaints. Mahdi Al-Tajir also stated that the Foreign Office gave instructions to start reforms after Iranian complaints about "misrule in Bahrain". Other reasons that prompted British action include oil explorations, Ibn Saud's ambitions and local instability.) The Foreign Office was troubled by these articles as they "afford[ed] opportunity for anti-British agitations in Persia and elsewhere". It asked the Government of India to "express their earnest hope that steps might be taken forthwith for the introduction at Bahrain of reforms tending to ensure the equitable treatment of Shi'a". The message was forwarded to Trevor and Daly who agreed in January 1923 that the needed reforms revolved around taxation, courts and pearl diving. Trevor added that "material force" might be needed to enforce the reforms. During the same month, Ahmad bin Khamis, a Bahrani leader threatened Daly to publish their cause in the Indian media if reforms are not carried out. Shaikh Isa rejected a plan to supply Manama with water and electricity, despite attempts by several leading figures. (Note: Daly stated that that water and electricity plan was supported by the Manama municipality and the city's notables. He added that for 2 years Shaikh Isa had refused to give green line to the plan, despite repeated attempts to convince him, including by his sons. The plan was not to be financed by Shaikh Isa and he was "offered a royalty on the water".)

In March 1923, the Foreign Office asked the Government of India to introduce reforms. In face of these developments, the Government of India reluctantly agreed and told the Foreign Office in April:

We are anxious to use every endeavour to induce Shaikh Isa ostensibly on his own initiative, it should be explained to Shaikh Isa that his subjects were prevented from rising against him by our protection alone, and that we shall back him up in carrying out reforms. Failing that even if it means his enforced retirement and the deportation of Shaikh Abdulla we are determined to carry out reforms ourselves.

The Foreign Office gave its authorization and the Political Resident was to carryout the order "as the opportunity arose".

Later in March 1923, Al Dawasir attacked Barbar, a Baharnah village. On 20 April, a fight occurred between Persians and Najdis in which several of them were injured. The small municipal police force was able to contain the situation quickly. Khayri mentioned that one Bastaki Persian had almost died due severe beating. Shaikh Isa's administration however did not punish the perpetrators from either side.

During the same month, Lt Col Stuart George Knox became the acting Resident after Trevor went on leave. Knox was less enthusiastic about reforms and thought they were not in the interest of Britain. He stated that "misrule" had not increased in the past 20 years and that intervention would cause international repercussions. He also though that the Persian agitations were a smoke screen to revive their claim over Bahrain and thus it would not ease if reforms were implemented. The Viceroy of India was quick to point out to Knox that "misrule" in Bahrain would have been the only "serious flaw" in any future case of dispute with Persia over Bahrain in the League of Nations. He also noted that "publicity [was] a new factor that can't be ignored". Knox was ordered to act when 3-day-riots broke in Manama between Persians and Arabs of Najdi origin on 10 May 1923. (Note: Al-Rumaihi wrote that participants in the riots were from different segments of the Bahraini society and that they were named "Najdi-Persian riots" due to the nationality of the alleged lead figures, however letters by Shaikhs Isa and Hamad referred to the incident as fitnah (civil strife) between the Persian and Najdi communities.)

=== Najdi-Persian riots ===
The specific sequence of events is disputed, but it is accepted that riots started after Abdulla al-Qusaibi (an agent of Ibn Saud and a pearl merchant) had accused a Persian shopkeeper of stealing a watch from his house. The matter was then taken to Mohammed Sharif who defused the situation by paying the cost of the watch. Few moments later, two Persians approached Sharif with injuries allegedly inflicted by Najdis. News reached the market and soon Persians and Najdis were clashing with each other. The clashes left 2 Persians and one Najdi dead in addition to a dozen of injuries, three critically. Khayri stated that those who started the riots were the same people involved in the earlier fight in April 1923. He added that as soon as the fight erupted, Persians closed their shops and raised their arms in the face of Najdis. Najdis retaliated with stronger force and the riots continued to the afternoon.

The situation subsided after Daly deployed guards from the British agency. He then held a meeting with Shaikh Hamad, al-Qusaibi and Sharif in which he held the latter two responsible for any further disturbances. Al-Qusaibi was accused of repeatedly inciting the Najdis to commit violence and in turn he accused Sharif of ordering municipality guards, who were mostly Persians to open fire on rioters. As a precaution, Daly requested that guards hand over their weapons. Although Daly did not dispute that the guards were prone to be biased towards their fellow Persians, he noted that there were no gunshot injuries among rioters.

On the following day, the atmosphere was still tense with sporadic clashes. Armed Najdis were gathered at houses, including al-Qusaibi house, and rumors that Persians did the same were rife. Several armed groups of Najdis in Muharraq island and Al Dawasir in Budaiya tried to land in Manama. They were carrying Ibn Saud flag, chanting war songs and firing in air, but were deterred by the presence of machine gun–armed British troops. On the third day, some armed Najdis remained in the streets, while Persians were instructed by Daly to stay at homes. Overall, eight people were killed. Following the end of riots, Shaikh Hamad said al-Qusaibi was responsible for the violence and that he told Najdis about his plans several days before. Daly also held al-Qusaibi responsible, at best for exploiting the situation to instigate Najdis to riot and at worst for master-planning the riots.

Al-Hassan mentioned that "most researchers" blamed riots on al-Qusaibi. Mohammed Al Tajir mentioned that the administration of Shaikh Isa "appeared" to be involved in instigating Najdis to riot, yet he also accused Sharif of instigating Persians to kill Najdis. As a witness to the events, Mohammed Al Tajir excused the government for not being able to control riots at first, because rioters were not Bahrainis and "it could not do much". Khayri who also witnessed the events blamed the riots on Shaikh Isa's administration which he accused of being biased in favor of Najdis. He also noted that Shaikh Isa was headquartered in Muharraq, where groups of armored Najdis had tried to lunch an attack on Manama. (Note: Nader Kadhim described Khayri as an enlightened and free-minded Sunni intellectual who supported the reforms.) Ibn Saud accused Sharif of being behind the riots, accused the municipal guards of being biased against Najdis and criticized Britain as being one-sided.

=== Abdication of Shaikh Isa ===
On 12 May 1923, the third day of riots in Manama, Ibn Saud advanced to Hofuf, near Bahrain. On the same day, Al Dawasir attacked A'ali village and Al Khawalid attacked Sitra, both Baharnah villages. The raids resulted in 12 people killed, dozens wounded and women raped. (Note: Al-Rumaihi gave 19 May as the date of the Al Dawasir attack on A'ali. Hashim stated that the village of Diraz was also attacked by Al Dawasir, but did not specify a date.) On 15 May, Knox arrived in Bahrain in two gunships. He deported al-Qusaibi and sacked Sharif. Shortly after this, Ibn Saud retreated to Riyadh. In the following days, Knox held meetings with Shaikhs Isa, Hamad and Abdulla to negotiate Shaikh Isa's voluntary abdication in favor of his elder son, Shaikh Hamad.

Shaikh Isa objected on the basis that such move would humiliate him and lead to a confrontation with the tribes. Knox listed the shortcomings of the Shaikh and his mismanagement of internal affairs. He also reminded him of Abdul Rahman Al Saud who retired at old age and delegated his son, Ibn Saud to lead the tribe without feeling humiliated. Shaikh Isa, now aged 75, still refused, saying the situation was different. He requested that tribes must be consulted on the matter first. He added after further discussion that he would rather be decapitated or drowned than abdicate voluntarily. Knox refused to entertain any of his suggestions. As a last attempt to save his position, Shaikh Isa tried to enlist the support of Baharnah to a petition prepared by him, however they signed another petition calling for his forced abdication and listing a number of grievances.

On 26 May 1923, Knox held a major meeting with a couple hundred leading Bahraini figures from various backgrounds. Knox was in the middle, with Shaikh Hamad to his right, Daly to his left and Shaikh Abdulla to the left of Daly. In the meeting, which was described as "moving", Knox announced the abdication of Shaikh Isa. Shaikh Hamad agreed, stating: "In obedience to the orders of the High Government, today I assume on my shoulders the responsibility of the Government of this country". Shaikh Isa is reported to have "accepted the verdict reluctantly". Although Shaikh Isa was forcefully abdicated, he was allowed to keep the title of "Shaikh of Bahrain" and Shaikh Hamad -now the actual ruler- was known as the Deputy Ruler. (Note: After the death of Shaikh Isa in 1932, Shaikh Hamad was formally acknowledged as "Ruler of Bahrain" by the Viceroy of India.)

Knox then gave a speech in which he affirmed the British support for administrative reforms, announced transforming custom revenues to Shaikh Hamad and told Al Dawasir that they may migrate to Saudi Arabia as they have frequently threatened, but that they should not "be surprised if [their] lands and houses are confiscated". He then addressed the Al Khalifa and the Shia. To the former he said they "must not expect that [they] have the right to live on the rest of community .. by preying on the poor and helpless". To the latter he said "[m]uch of the agitation of recent years has been fictitious" and that they "must not expect equality at a bound and Sunni privileges cannot be swept away at once, if at all". He also assured Sunnis that "reforms would lead to ultimate benefit of [their] community". Al Khawalid promised to reduce taxes on Sitra residents, but raised them again as soon as Knox left.

=== Further violence and trials ===
The petitions and political crisis continued to the reign of Shaikh Hamad. Opponents of the reforms demanded dismissing Daly and revocations of the reforms, especially those abolishing fidawis and the salifa court. They produced a large amount of "petitions, memorials, cables and articles in the press". Baharnah on the other hand continued supporting Shaikh Hamad, Daly and the reforms. A criminal court was set up to rule in the cases of violence. Al Dawasir and Al Khawalid reacted by intimidating the witnesses.

In June 1923, Al Dawasir attacked A'ali again, killing three people and severely injuring 4. They "looted most of the village". On 23 June, their tribe chief, Ahmad bin Abdullah was held responsible for the attack on A'ali. He had to serve few days in jail and compensate the victims. In revenge, a group of Al Dawasir attacked and killed two Baharnah notables near Budaiya on 10 July. (Note: Mai Al Khalifa disputed this statement and wrote that there was no evidence of Al Dawasir involvement in the incident nor was there a trial.) The two had encouraged residents of A'ali to witness against Al Dawasir. Ahmad bin Abdullah was held responsible again, and this time fined Rs. 15,000. Following this, most of Al Dawasir decided to leave Bahrain to the mainland. The remaining were forced to leave by November, as their presence threatened the security of the island. (Note: According to Khuri, mass emigration of a tribe is "an implicit declaration of war". Khuri gave 18 July as the date Al Dawasir emigrated from Bahrain.) As Knox and Trevor had previously warned, Al Dawasir properties were confiscated. They were prevented from diving in Bahrain pearl banks and their divers were freed from all debts. (Note: After their settlement in Dammam, Al Dawasir were heavily taxed by Ibn Saud and sought to return to Bahrain. They were prevented from doing so in March 1924 by Daly. In 1927, after Daly had left they were allowed to return on the condition that they be treated equality with others and not as a superior class. They were granted tens of thousands of rupees as compensation for their confiscated properties, rents collected by state and divers' debts.)

On 18 September 1923, Al Khawalid attacked one village in Sitra and killed a man on the pretension that one of their camels was injured while grazing there. This case was more complicated as they were members of Al Khalifa family and direct cousins of the new ruler. Shaikh Hamad was in a deadlock; the law mandated him to punish Al Khawalid, while his tribal responsibilities held him to support his family in right and wrong. On 22 September, Shaikh Hamad -advised by Daly- held a court for Al Khawalid. The offenders were Shaikh Khalid, his sons Ali and Salman, and two of his servants. Shaikh Khalid was fined Rs. 2,000 and ordered to move his residence from Sitra to Riffa. Ali, who led the attack was banished for ten year. (Note: Ali was originally banished for life, but Shaikh Hamad reduced his sentence to 10 years. Also, Rs. 300 was to be paid for him monthly during his banishment time. Ali returned to Bahrain in July 1926 and was sentenced to six months jail for breaching the first sentence. Commenting on this, Daly noted that while the new sentence was disproportionate to the severity of the crime, it was "revolutionary" that members of the ruling family be jailed.) Salman was banished for one year and the two servants were imprisoned. Although the sentences were viewed as light by the Shia, they represented a victory for law and order as this was the first time a court finds members of the ruling family guilty.

Al Khawalid however, were not happy with the result and held deep grudge against residents of Sitra who witnessed against them. On the night of 8 January 1924, they attacked Wadyan village in Sitra and the nearby Tubli village, killing several Baharnah men, women and children. Thousands of Baharnah reacted by staging protests for several days at the British Political Agency and sending petitions to Daly and Trevor. Shaikh Hamad was on a trip and his younger brother, Shaikh Mohammad acted on his behalf. Al Khawalid's guilt in the crime was established by witnesses accounts, but they left the country after refusing to appear before any court, except the Sharia court.

Shaikh Hamad returned to Bahrain on 14 January 1924 and after discussing the matter with Daly ordered the arrest of the remaining suspects. Trevor was cabled by the Government of India who told him to ask Shaikh Hamad to punish the perpetrators, even if they belonged to his own family and that they will lend him support in doing so. (Note: The letter Trevor sent to the Government of India before receiving the cable read as follows: "I may observe again that the Shiah community after years of oppression are absolutely incapable of doing anything for themselves and can only petition us and whine. If they banded together and resisted the oppression of Khalifah family I think they could have done a great deal long ago... This being the case, our task in Bahrain of bolstering up a ruling family, which cannot rule justly or efficiently, and of helping at the same time a community which cannot help themselves is an extremely thankless one".) Trevor arrived in Bahrain on 25 January, and a trial was set up for Al Khawalid the next day. The witnesses provided strong criminalizing evidence, which was described by Daly as "very conclusive and left no shadow of doubt as to the guilt of the accused". Shaikh Khalid was fined Rs. 2,000 and asked to leave Rifaa for Muharraq. (Note: Baharnah refused to receive the Rs. 2,000.) His son Ibrahim, the leader of the attack was sentenced to death in absentia. Salman bin Khalid, who was already serving his banishment from the previous attack was also sentenced to death in absentia. Another perpetrator was sentenced to death in absentia and the remaining were given prison terms ranging from 6 months to 10 years. (Note: Daly noted that death sentence for the main perpetrators was only given because they had escaped and it was "extremely unlikely" to be carried out.)

On 13 October 1926, four gunmen fired at Shaikh Hamad's car while he and his family were on their way to Budaiya. All of the shots missed the target. Despite offering a generous prize for information leading to the perpetrators, no one was arrested. Upon the emergence of new evidence in 1929, Ibrahim bin Khalid was arrested and found guilty. Shaikh Hamad however, did not take any action in the case, instead he appointed Ibrahim in his newly built Al-Sakhir Palace. Three of the hired gunmen were arrested in 1930; two were sentenced to life, while the third was killed while trying to escape jail.

=== Peaceful opposition ===
Other Al Khalifa did not resort to violence. Instead they wrote numerous letter and petitions to higher British authorities and to their friends abroad. In Muharraq and Manama, students at the school opened by Shaikh Abdulla posted anti-British leaflets on houses of those who supported reforms. Mohammad bin Abdulla (the son of Shaikh Abdulla) wrote to the Secretary of State for India. He also wrote two articles which appeared in the Syrian press. He was critical of the reforms and measures undertaken by the British such as arrest of Ahmad bin Abdullah Al-Dosari and forced abdication of Shaikh Isa. The latter also protested his forced abdication; Shaikh Isa sent several letters to British officials asking for an inquiry to investigate Bahrain's affairs. When Trevor returned from his leave on 21 October 1923, Shaikh Isa and Al Dawasir were optimistic and wrote a petition to him. Baharnah reacted by submitting a counter petition signed by 328 of them on 25 October.

On 26 October 1923, a group of 12 Sunni merchants and tribal leaders formed the "Bahrain National Congress" which called for six demands, among them were the restoration of Shaikh Isa as ruler unless he consented to the change, formation of a consultative council and that reforms should be compliant with Sharia and Urf. It is also stated that they have called for a legislative council. Congress members were described as "enlightened Sunni nationalist". Most of them were Nakhudas and merchants. According to Al-Rumaihi, the Congress leaders, Abdul Wahab al-Zayani and Ahmed bin Lahij (Note: Ahmed bin Lahij was a Najdi who had accompanied Al Dawasir in one of their visits to Ibn Saud. Abdul Wahab al-Zayani was a pearl merchant who was described by Ameen Rihani as "the leader of national revival in Bahrain". He opposed British increasing influence since the 1910s and in 1921 had campaigned for constitutional rights, which were resented by Shaikh Isa and Daly. Al-Zayani was asked to leave Bahrain for India in November 1921 and returned in 1923. According to Mahdi Al-Tajir, al-Zayani was reported to have received Rs. 150,000 in order to finance the anti-reform movement and that he formed the Congress as a disguise for introducing the idea of a Parliament.) tried to gather the support of a Bahrani leader, but they received a negative reply. (Note: Mahdi Al-Tajir noted that he could not find anything in official British correspondents to support Al-Rumaihi's aforementioned statement.) Shaikh Isa supported demands of the Congress, which were sent to Trevor. Shaikh Hamad met with some of the Congress members, but failed to reach a compromise.

During the same day of the Congress, a group of Baharnah notables led by Ahmad bin Khamis held a meeting. They submitted a petition of 9 points in which they renewed their support to the reforms, raised some demands and warned that they were ready to raise the issue with the British Parliament if their agitation was ignored. Trevor replied to the petitions by assuring Baharnah that reforms will continue and that their demands will be considered. He explained to Shaikh Isa that reforms were not the "personal wish of Knox or Daly", but orders of the British Government and that the "public scandal" of "tyranny and oppression" in Bahrain made them necessary. He noted that despite promising to do so, Shaikh Isa did not introduce any reforms.

Trevor then made a public announcement that "the orders of His Majesty's Government will be executed in all circumstances and the [reforms] will continue steadily without the least hindrance." On 1 November, Trevor arrived at Bahrain. He called for a meeting with the Bahrain National Congress at the British Political Agency on 7 November 1923. On the face of it, the purpose of the meeting was to discuss demands of the Congress, however when its member arrived, al-Zayani and bin Lahij were detained and deported to India. The movement died with the arrest of its leaders as it lacked popular support. With the end of all forms of opposition, the road was paved for implementation of the administrative reforms.

Al-Zayani continued his opposition to the reforms in India. Helped by Muhammad Ali Jinnah, he appealed to courts and to the Viceroy of India against his own deportation and Shaikh Isa's forced abdication. His efforts were largely fruitless and he died in 1925 at the age of 69. Shaikh Khalid died in 1925 as well. Several Arab newspapers in Syria, Egypt and Iraq were supportive of Shaikh Isa. Also, Hussein bin Ali, Sharif of Mecca and ruler of Qatar voiced their opposition to the reforms.

=== Implementation of reforms ===
One of the first reforms introduced by the new regime was the Civil List in June 1923. It allocated a monthly amount of Rs. 30,000 to the ruling family (this constituted 40% to 50% of state revenue). Shaikh Isa refused to receive his monthly salary of Rs. 4,000 initially, but in May 1926 he agreed to it. Members of the ruling family often complained that the allowances were not enough. In June 1923, the Government of India told Daly to avoid "interference too much and too directly" so that he does not become the actual ruler. In December, they questioned if British involvement had "gone too far" and in July 1924 it requested that reforms should not be carried further without the free consent of the ruler. (Note: Madhi Al-Tajir stated that this "revealed the Government's lack of familiarity with the specific issues of Bahrain." and "[threw] light on the pressures to which the Agent was subjected [to] while planning the reforms.") Trevor assured them that Shaikh Hamad had fully agreed to the reform plan. Also, Daly pointed out that Bahrain will continue to progress with or without British intervention due to its people's travels and education. Daly, helped by his strong personal relationship with Shaikh Hamad and the pro-reform petitions continued to take a prominent part in the implementation of reforms on a daily basis, well beyond the legal frame of BOIC.

==== Customs reforms ====
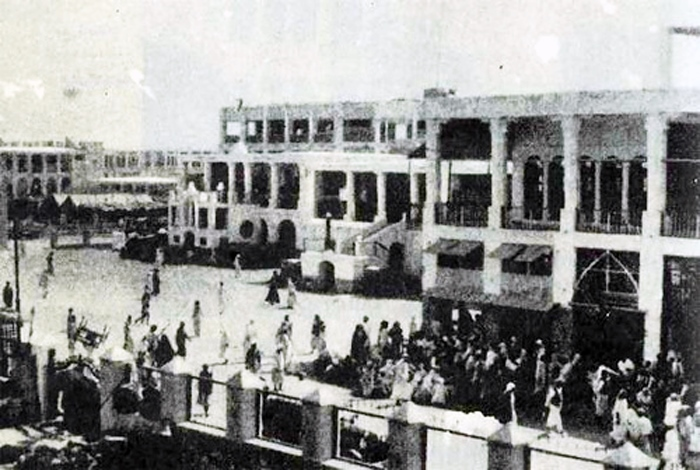
The reorganized customs office of Manama

In August 1923, the British appointed Mr. Bower to head the customs temporarily. He had previously served at the Imperial Indian Custom Service. He found obvious embezzlements and was able to recover Rs. 70,000. He also forced top merchants to pay on time, whereas previously they often delayed payments. The revenue of the customs, which was redirected to a government account in a British bank increased significantly that Bahrain's financial resources were described as "pleasingly solvent" by the end of 1923. On 14 January 1924, Bower was replaced with Claude de Grenier. Grenier was described by Trevor as a "qualified accountant" who had served in Baghdad and Bushehr. His work was praised by one British official who stated that "[Grenier] had increased State revenue by 20 per cent without raising customs duty; 97 per cent of the revenue accruing to the State was the result of his efforts". He remained in his position until 1929.

==== Judicial reforms ====
By the late 1920s, there were eight courts. They included those mentioned in the BOIC earlier, in addition to the Bahrain State Court (also known as Shaikh Hamad Court), opened in July 1923 for cases of Bahrainis against Bahrainis. It was based on the "Magna Carta" declaration of Shaikh Isa and introduced big improvements from previous practices in which "every member of Al-Khalifah family used to convict and punish Baharnah peasants without trial". Yet it suffered from major flaws as there was no codified law to refer to and prison conditions were miserable. (Note: One of the prisons was once compared by Daly to the Black Hole of Calcutta.) Two Sharia courts were in operation, one for Sunnis and the other for Shia. Daly criticized the sectarian judicial system, calling it "the root grievance of Bahrainis". The judicial system suffered from other flaws as well; most of the judges were members of the ruling family and did not have law degrees nor were they legally qualified.

Daly suggested that judges be elected by Bahrainis and put under British protection, and that Bahrainis be allowed to bring their cases to the Joint Court. The Political Resident supported this view, but the Government of India rejected it.

==== Police reforms ====
In June 1924, a power force of 150 Arabic-speaking Baluchis was recruited to serve as armed police. The force was requested by Shaikh Hamad in the end of 1923 and was approved by Trevor who thought that Arabs were "unsuitable" and Persians "objectionable to the Arabs". The Baluchis proved to be incompetent and undisciplined; in August 1926, one of them killed two of his colleagues and slightly injured Daly. (Note: One Persian newspaper wrote about this incident that "it was unfortunate that [Daly] was only struck in the ear by the bullet that was fired at him".) Another unsuccessfully attempted to assassinate the head of police. Therefore, they were disbanded and replaced by retired Indian Army Punjabis in November.

==== Pearl diving reforms ====
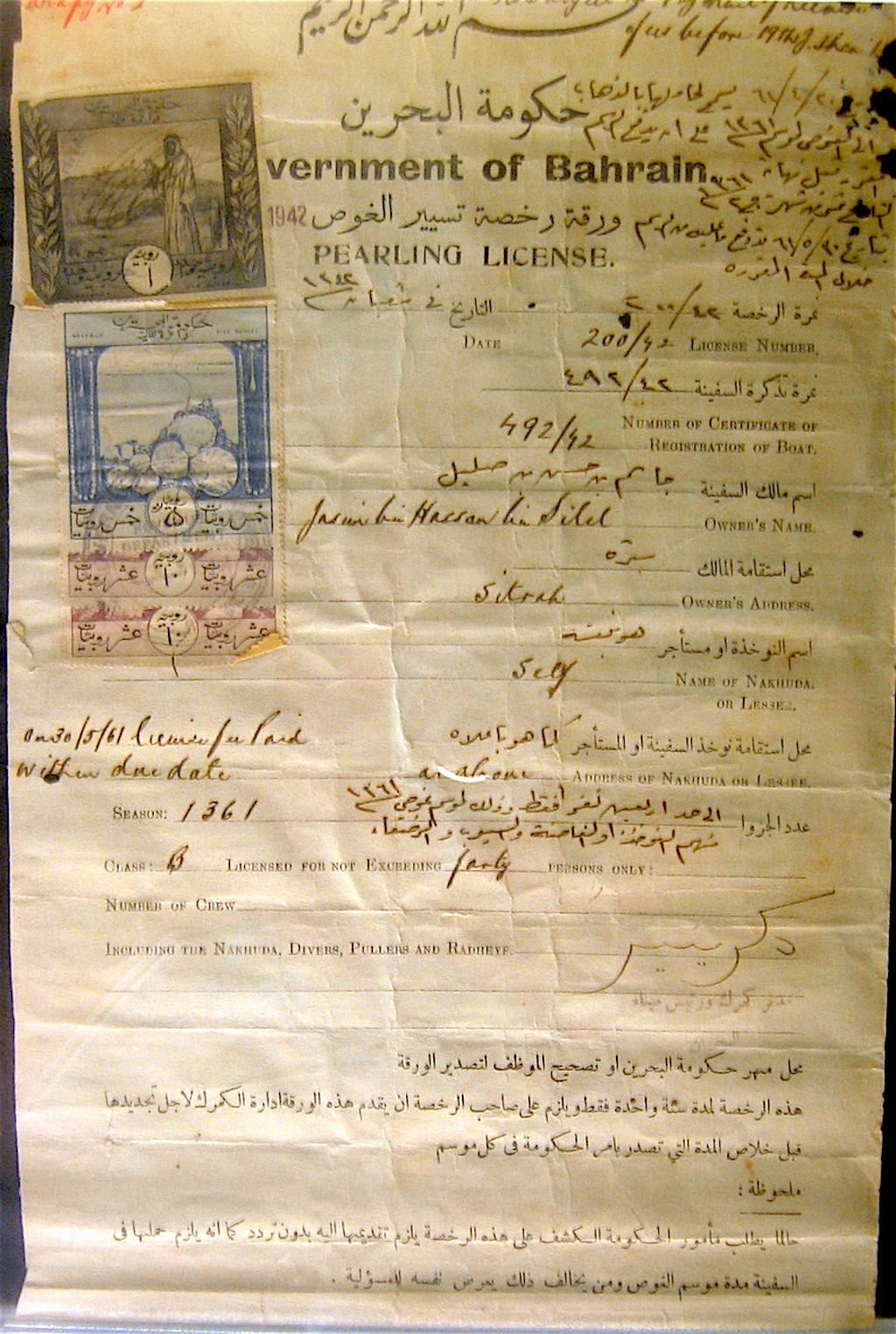
Bahraini pearling license in 1942.

In 1921 and 1922, during what Al-Hulaibi referred to as the Divers' Uprising, divers boycotted the tribal-biased salifa court and refused to pay debts to Nakhudas. The next year, salifa was suspended for investigation. It was found that some Nakhudas manipulated accounts to over-charge divers. The reforms began in 1924, (Note: Khuri stated that pearl diving reforms took place between 1921 and 1923, however other authors writing after Khuri stated that the year 1924 is the correct date.) when Nakhudas were required to keep a separate account book for each diver and a boat-licensing tax was introduced. (Note: One exception was made to the Al Bin Ali tribe by which they were exempted from paying taxes for up to ten boats. The basis of this was a document signed by Shaikh Isa and the Assistant Political Agent in 1900–4 which exempted them from all taxes.) The former change was aimed to protect divers' interests, while the latter provided large income to the state (~Rs. 50,000 in 1924). There were several other changes in favor of the divers such as preventing the Nakhudas from punishing divers on board the boat, preventing selling of pearls without the presence and consent of divers, and assigning a minimum wage for divers. Debts were no longer hereditary, but outstanding debts had to be paid.

Initially, the Nakhudas opposed these reforms and instigated divers against them. In time however, they reluctantly agreed to them. Although the reforms were in their favor, divers were not happy with the reforms, because they limited the pre- and post-season loans, which they needed to supply their families. (Note: Loans were limited to Rs. 200. The reason behind this was to prevent divers' debts from building up.) They protested annually during the beginning and end of the diving season. Merchants and pilots supported these protests. It was only after several years that the divers realized the reforms were in their benefit.

==== Land reforms ====
In 1924, Land Registration Office was opened to "register sales and transfer of property and to deal with cases of land disputes". In April 1925, a cadastral survey was conducted to register properties. There were two main goals, the first was to end the decades-long practice of "squeezing the indigenous Shiah population out of their [date-groves]" and the second was to tax all lands equally in order to support state budget. The Registration office was replaced by the Land Registry Department in March 1926, which shortly branched into a Survey Department.

The "feudal estate" system was abolished. Land was divided to six categories: private land, government land, Shia endowment, Sunni endowment, progeny land and heirs land. About half of land was private properties, and Shia endowments far outnumbered their Sunni counterpart (33.6% to 0.7% of overall land, respectively). A Shia endowments department was formed in 1927, which transferred the control of these lands from the traditional authority of Shia jurists to the government. Ownership of private lands was given on the basis of occupation (10 years or more) and the historical ruler-issued "gift declarations" documents. Other lands were referred to the courts. Difficulties soon aroused within the ruling family over distribution of former estates, but a deal in 1932 was reached that included prohibiting forced labor and tax collection, and established of a "family court" to deal with intra-Al Khalifa disputes. Unregistered and unclaimed lands were registered to the state. The Al Khalifa ended up owning much of the agricultural lands in northern parts of Bahrain.

Land renting was put under government supervision, with parties to it having to write out and submit to authorities the terms and conditions of contracts. With taxes and forced labor abolished, there was no need for wazirs and kikhdas and so these positions were abolished as well. A lighter state taxation system was introduced, it only contributed to a small percent of state budget, while the biggest part was through customs, especially those on pearl industry. The ruling family received much of the budget; in 1930 half of it was allocated to them either as allowances or salaries.

==== Arrival of Belgrave and departure of Daly ====
Since 1923, Daly had been pressuring British authorities to approve a position for a judicial adviser. In 1925, he got approval from London. Shaikh Hamad is reported to have asked Daly to find a suitable British officer to work as a financial adviser for him. Daly advertised for the matter in British newspapers. Charles Belgrave was appointed to the post after an interview with Daly. Belgrave arrived at Bahrain in July 1925. Daly received him and showed him over the country. Daly who had "substantially" ruled Bahrain left the country in September 1926, becoming Bahrain's longest-serving British Political Agent. Only few Bahrainis came to see him off. His position was filled by Major Barrett.

Shaikh Hamad retracted some of the important decision he undertook when Daly was the Political Agent. Most notably were the cases of Al Dawasir and Al Khawalid. In 1927, about one year after Daly had left Bahrain, Shaikh Hamad said he was "disgrace[d]" by the confiscation of Al Dawasir properties, which was done under his name. He had agreed to pay them Rs. 200,000 to 300,000 in compensation, but was convinced by the Political Agent and members of his family to only pay them a third of that amount. In January 1927, Ibrahim bin Khalid contacted Shaikh Hamad, asking to be allowed to return to Bahrain. The plan was to reconcile between Al Khawalid and the residents of Sitra. The latter group would then drop the case and no retrial would be ordered. Belgrave protested against this move, calling it "disingenuous". Shaikh Hamad however stated that the initial trial was illegal and that he sentenced Al Khawalid to death against his own will in order to appease Daly.

Barrett stated that the initial trial was fair and that evidence was strong (27 witnesses). He advised Shaikh Hamad to hold a retrial for them before the Sharia court. Shaikh Hamad however acted contrary to the Agent's advice; on 30 April 1928, 2 days after Ibrahim and his brother Salman had returned to Bahrain, he held a meeting that was attended by a Shia judge, the head of Sitra community (where the attacks occurred), Belgrave and children of the victims. The latter agreed to drop the charges after Shaikh Hamad had assured them that previous offenses would not be repeated. It was then proclaimed that Ibrahim and Salman were free to return to Bahrain. Also, they were given monthly allowances and their confiscated property was returned. The victims' families received blood-money and were compensated for properties stolen during the attack. The British Political Agent and Resident did not object. The latter expressed his hope that would help build trust between Al Khalifa and the Shia.

== Aftermath ==
By the end of the 1920s, the administration in Bahrain was described as "reasonably efficient and modern". The British involvement however, was very deep. Belgrave was in control of all offices and British officials involvement was described in November 1927 by Denys Bray, the Secretary of the Foreign Department of the Government of India as "more than desirable". "A British Financial Adviser, British Police Superintendent and British Customs Manamager, this is more British than Katal, which is a Border state", he added. He also stated that the British position in Bahrain could only be adequately covered by a treaty that would extinguish "the Shaikh's sovereignty to a degree less than that possessed by an Indian chief. (Note: One British official wrote that this situation should be remedied by educating Bahrainis to become efficient enough and replace the British officials. He summarized his motivation for this suggestion in follows: "In time the good works and the tyranny from which the British rescued Bahrain and especially the Shiah Baharnah will be forgotten, and only the privileged position of the British occupying the chief posts will be noticed".) A more optimistic description of the situation was made in 1929 by C. G. Prior, then the British Political Agent. He stated that the British officials were indispensable and that they have made enormous improvements to the administration. He also said:

The Baharnah have had security and justice for the first time for 150 years and have come to think of their rights. Divers' serfage has been much ameliorated and there is little or no opposition to Government activities and crimes of violence have almost ceased... Instead of resisting the reforms the public spirit now demands them.

The relationship between Baharnah and Al Khalifa was "improved dramatically". Baharnah co-operated with the administration and were optimistic about reforms. Despite these improved conditions of the Shia, Mahdi Al-Tajir stated that by 1929 some inequalities remained, especially with regards to "education, law and representation on various Government Councils". Schumacher gave an even darker evaluation of the situations. She stated that:

British reforms reaffirmed inequalities and reinforced the Sunni-ruler/Shi'i-ruled equation by institutionalising Al Khalifa power. The Al Khalifa no longer had to steal land because the methods devised for determining land ownership guaranteed that most of it belonged to them. "Fleecing the Baharna" could be done legally through the new judicial system, whose judges were the Al Khalifa and the British president... The institutions set up by the British and controlled by the Al khalifa did little more than to redirect Baharna complaints". (Note: She added further that "the development of a central bureaucratic structure in the country further entrenched the presumed sectarian antagonism by institutionalising access to economic and political power in terms of sectarian affiliation. Just as, in the earliest days of Al Khalifa rule, ally tribesmen were given pieces of agricultural land and exempted from taxes, so too in the later decades of the Al Khalifa administration were supporters rewarded with positions in the new government".)

Although many in Al Khalifa initially opposed the reforms, they gradually accepted them and cooperated with the new authority. They ended up taking many of the newly created offices such as Minister of Education, head of police and judges. Shaikh Isa however, remained opposed to the reforms and continued to view himself as ruler of Bahrain. For instance, in April 1924 when Lt-Col F. B. Prideaux succeeded Trevor as British Political Resident, Shaikh Isa sent him a congratulatory telegram as ruler of Bahrain. Several influential members of Al Khalifa also continued to oppose the reforms and therefore remained under the surveillance Belgrave until his departure in 1957, after which they began to regain their former influence. Belgrave presided over many positions, that Shaikh Hamad was widely seen as "little more than a puppet".

== Legacy ==
The call for reforms is seen as the first in a series of subsequent reform movements in the 1930s, 1950s, 1970s, 1990s and 2011. The reforms have empowered Baharnah to realize their political weight and express their demands vocally (as they did for instance in 1934), whereas in the past they did not take part in politics, despite their miserable conditions under the Al Khalifa. The reforms helped unite Shia and Sunni Bahrainis during the 1930s as the judiciary was then divided on the basis of nationality and both groups were thus categorized as "Bahraini".

Even after many decades, the opposition to the reforms did not die out completely; during the reign of Isa bin Salman Al Khalifa (1961–99), the grand grandson of Shaikh Isa, some government publications refused to acknowledge 1923 as the end of Shaikh Isa's reign, instead they extended it to 1932, the year of his death. A history book published by University of Bahrain in 2009 and taught to its students also extended Shaikh Isa's reign to 1932. The book described his reign briefly, but made no mention of his forced abdication.

== Analysis ==
Bahraini author Saeed al-Shehabi criticized the view of some Bahraini nationalists who opposed the reforms because of their opposition to the British. He argued that the oppression of Baharnah by Shaikh Isa's administration and the Sunni tribes required the abdication of Shaikh Isa. Al-Shehabi opposed appointing Shaikh Hamad as ruler, but viewed it as the lesser of two evils. He preferred if authority had been given to one of the people, but argued that the British would not have allowed this, because they required a weak ruler who needed them to keep the office. American political scientists Michael Herb had a similar analysis, describing Hamad as a "puppet" who was dependent on Britain due to lacking family support.

Both Al-Shehabi and Saudi author Al-Hassan argued that the British intervention had sought to defuse any possible Baharnah revolution against Al Khalifa. This view is supported by a letter sent by the British Political Residency to Ibn Saud on 15 June 1923, in which it is stated that British intervention would lead in the long term to stabilizing the Al Khalifa regime and maintaining Sunni dominance over the island. Bahraini historian, Mohammed Al Tajir (d. 1967) mentioned that the only cause of British intervention was to put Bahrain under its control without having to wage a war. He explained that following the defeat of the Ottomans and Germans in World War I, the scene was clear for the British to overpower Bahrain. Al Tajir also accused Daly of seeking to divide and conquer by inciting Shia against Sunnis and vice versa. He cited a particular incident in which Daly told a group of Baharnah who came to seek protection to revenge from their oppressors and offered to give them weapons if they did not have any.

Mai Al Khalifa, Bahrain's Minister of Culture argued that the British aim behind the reforms was to gain power and that they have deceived and used the Baharnah for this goal while privately warning Ibn Saud against their influence. Al Khalifa also wrote that members of Bahrain National Congress were motivated by their interests and traditional values. She cited their objection to the establishment of the airport, which undermined their traditional transportation trade as evidence. She also cited their opposition to the opening of cinemas for religious reasons. Al Khalifa was very critical of Daly, often describing him as the "de facto ruler" and accusing him of stirring sectarian tensions. She was also supportive of Shaikh Isa (her great-great-uncle) and described him as the legitimate ruler. She however, acknowledged the importance of modern institutions that were introduced by the reforms and laid the foundations of modern Bahrain.

In a jointly authored book, Sawsan Al Sha'er and Mohammed Jassim argued that the goal of British intervention in Bahrain was to fill any gap that could afford a foothold to other foreign powers and to turn Bahrain into their main base in the Persian Gulf. Also, they stated that Political Agents, aided by the prestige of the British Empire had ambitions to rule Bahrain; they argued that Daly had exaggerated the intensity of the situation in Bahrain in order to convince higher British authorities to intervene in its local affairs. They also analyzed the causes of Shaikh Isa's opposition to British interventions; they stated that he resented and was embarrassed from being treated differently from other Arab rulers who enjoyed a higher degree of independence and that his son, Shaikh Abdulla had played a great role in alienating his father from the British. They stated that Baharnah leaders represented the pro-British party Bray had suggested and that were tools in the hands of the British who had successfully used sectarian differences to divide and rule. They concluded that whatever Baharnah motivations were, their actions were a great mistake that had deepened mistrust between them and Al Khalifa and that its consequences remain to this day.

Mansoor al-Jamri rejected the aforementioned conclusion, calling the book "sick", "very poor, unrealistic, badmouthing, and raises hatred and sectarianism", because according to him, the book advocated the idea that Baharnah were agents for the British. He added that Baharnah were forced to seek British protection, because unlike other groups (e.g. Persians and Najdis) Baharnah were vulnerable to oppression by Shaikh Isa's regime as they had no one to protect them. The conclusion al-Jamri said one should reach is to read history carefully, understand it and try to live in peace with it. Nelida Fuccaro stated that the goal of reforms was "empowering large sections of the impoverished Arab Shi‘i population and at keeping the political activities of Iran among the local Persian communities in check while creating a suitable framework for the continuation of the rule of the al-Khalifah family". Hamza wrote that oil exploration was the reason behind the reforms. Abdulhadi Khalaf referred to Britain actions against opponents of the reforms as "highhanded colonial measures". He also wrote that the reforms led to "unfinished dual processes of nation- and state building".

Al-Rumaihi described the demands of Bahrain National Congress as "extremely progressive" and argued that they would have "sown the seeds of a more constitutional form of government" if accepted back then. He also described their demands as "moderate", because they were not insistent on the restoration of Shaikh Isa as ruler. He added that Baharnah did not cooperate with this movement due to the longstanding mistrust between the two communities and criticized British officers for favoring "reforms when imposed by themselves, but not when proposed by the indigenous Bahraini population". Mahdi Al-Tajir wrote that one of the important reasons behind Baharnah opposition to the Bahrain National Congress was its call for re-installment of Shaikh Isa, which Baharnah "had suffered greatly" during his reign. He added that "psychological and religious cleavages of the past" were a stumbling block to the unity between Baharnah and Sunnis.

Bahraini cultural critic Nader Kadhim wrote that the main difference between the Sunni-led Bahrain National Congress and Baharnah was their priorities; while the latter were very firm in demanding equality, the former was very firm in demanding national sovereignty. He also wrote that al-Zayani favored the reforms, yet opposed them, because he considered them a British interference in Bahraini affairs. He added that if the two groups had joined forces, then this would have led to major political and social changes, and would have disintegrated the conformity of Shia and opposition in its infancy (it has become a norm to see Shia as anti-government and Sunnis as pro-government). Kadhim criticized the control of the tribal powers over the new administration, blaming them for the failure to reach a general consensus within the state, because their control went against the neutrality required for others to enjoy the benefits of the state without discrimination.

Lebanese anthropologist Fuad Khuri mentioned that throughout the period of reforms, issues relating to government legitimacy, "public delegation, consent or any other form of representation" were not discussed, instead reforms were only focused on the administration. "In other words, the reforms laid down the foundations of 'modern' bureaucracy without establishing a 'modern' political system," he added. Humaidan agreed with Khuri that reforms ignored democratic demands, adding that although the reforms were enforced by the British, they saved "the system from severe structural crises threatening its stability". He added that the Bahrain National Congress demands did not gather much support due to being associated with the violent faction that had opposed reforms.

F. Gregory Gause argues that the reforms did not reduce the power base of Al Khalifa and its tribal allies, but forced them to change their methods while remaining dominant. Al-Jamri also stated that the reforms did not shift the status quo as the "[t]ribal elements made-up the core of the state". In his opinion, the reforms only succeeded in ending the "obvious parts of the feudal-tribal system", but failed in "amalgamating modern administration with tribal structure". Fred H. Lawson argued the reforms were no more than "modernization of autocracy".

A study by S.K. Datta and J.B. Nugent argued that the pearl diving reforms were "counter-productive" and "contribut[ed] to the demise of the pearling industry". The basis of this conclusion is that removal of hereditary debts raised the cost of "recruitment of labour" and "granting of loans", and that giving equal loans to divers regardless of their skill reduced the competition between them. Mahdi Al-Tajir stated that the aforementioned analysis was exaggerated, despite containing some "measure of truth" in it. He added that the real causes behind the demise of pearling were not the regulations against abuse, but were the Great Depression of the 1930s, introduction of Japanese cultured pearls and the discovery of oil in Bahrain. Littlefield gave the same 3 reasons to explain the demise of the pearl industry. Hussain Esmail wrote that while Daly was one of the worst Political Agents in Bahrain's history, the reforms he introduced into pearl diving were one of his few good deeds.

== Notes and references ==
=== Bibliography ===
English

- Khuri, Fuad Ishaq (1980). Tribe and state in Bahrain: The transformation of social and political authority in an Arab state. University of Chicago Press. ISBN 978-0-226-43473-5.
- Al-Tajir, Mahdi Abdalla (1987). Bahrain, 1920-1945: Britain, the Shaikh, and the Administration. Croom Helm. ISBN 978-0-7099-5122-3.
- Al-Rumaihi, Mohammed Ghanim (1975). Bahrain: A study on social and political change since the First World War. University of Kuwait. ASIN B0007AO482. LCCN 79110522.
- Fuccaro, Nelida (3 September 2009). Histories of City and State in the Persian Gulf: Manama Since 1800. Cambridge University Press. ISBN 978-0-521-51435-4.
- Radhi, Hassan Ali (1 January 2003). Judiciary and Arbitration in Bahrain: A Historical and Analytical Study. Brill Publishers. ISBN 978-90-411-2217-9.
- Herb, Michael (1999). All in the Family: Absolutism, Revolution, and Democracy in the Middle Eastern Monarchies. SUNY Press. ISBN 978-0-7914-4167-1.
- Louër, Laurence (2008). Transnational Shia Politics: Religious and Political Networks in the Gulf. London, United Kingdom: Hurst Publishers. ISBN 978-1-85065-911-2.
- Jarman, R. (30 November 1986). Bahrain Government Annual Reports 1924-1970. Cambridge Archive Editions. Vol. 3. Archive Editions Ltd. ISBN 978-1852070403.
- Nakash, Yitzhak (30 October 2011). Reaching for Power: The Shi'a in the Modern Arab World. Princeton University Press. ISBN 978-1-4008-4146-2.
- Farah, Talal Toufic (1985). Protection and politics in Bahrain, 1869-1915. American University of Beirut. ISBN 978-0-8156-6074-3.
- Rush, Alan de Lacy (1991). Bahrain: The Ruling Family of Al-Khalifah. Archive Editions. ISBN 978-1-85207-310-7.
- Holes, Clive (2001). Dialect, Culture, and Society in Eastern Arabia: Glossary. BRILL. ISBN 978-90-04-10763-2.
- Gause, F. Gregory (1994). Oil Monarchies: Domestic and Security Challenges in the Arab Gulf States. Council on Foreign Relations. ISBN 978-0-87609-151-7.
- Bidwell, Robin Leonard; Bourne, Kenneth; Watt, Donald Cameron; Great Britain. Foreign Office (1985). British documents on foreign affairs--reports and papers from the Foreign Office confidential print: From the First to the Second World War. Series B, Turkey, Iran, and the Middle East, 1918-1939. University Publications of America. ISBN 978-0-89093-603-0.
- Belgrave, Charles (1996) [First published 1960]. Personal Column. Librairie du Liban Publishers. ISBN 9780866850049.
- Marlowe, John Psued (1962). The Persian Gulf in the twentieth century. Praeger. OCLC 164687436.
- Busch, Briton Cooper (1967). Britain and the Persian Gulf, 1894-1914. University of California Press. LCCN 67024120. OCLC 626554.
- Lorimer, John Gordon (1915) [First published 1908]. Gazetteer of the Persian Gulf, 'Oman, and Central Arabia. Vol. 2. Calcutta, India: Superintendent Government Printing.
- Fuccaro, Nelida (January 2005). "Chapter 2: Mapping the transnational community". In Al-Rasheed, Madawi (ed.). Transnational Connections and the Arab Gulf. Transnationalism. Routledge.
- Al-Tajir, Mahdi Abdalla (5 September 2013) [First published 1982]. Language and Linguistic origins in Bahrain: The Baharnah dialect of Arabic. Routledge. ISBN 978-1-136-13626-9.
- Elsheshtawy, Yasser (27 May 2008). The Evolving Arab City: Tradition, Modernity and Urban Development. Routledge. ISBN 978-1-134-12821-1.
- Izzard, Molly (April 1979). The Gulf: Arabia's western approaches. John Murray. ISBN 978-0719536458.
- Matveev, Konstantin Petrovich (1997). Bahrain: The Drive for Democracy. Prittle Brook. ISBN 978-0-9521814-1-5.
- Khalaf, Abdulhadi (13–16 August 1998). Contentious politics in Bahrain: From ethnic to national and vice versa. The fourth Nordic conference on Middle Eastern Studies: The Middle East in globalizing world. Oslo, Norway. Archived from the original on July 27, 2014.
- al-Jamri, Mansoor (22 November 1997). Prospects of a Moderate Islamist Discourse: The Case of Bahrain. Middle East Studies Association Annual Meeting. San Francisco, United States.
- al-Jamri, Mansoor (6 December 1998). State and Civil Society in Bahrain. Middle East Studies Association Annual Meeting. Chicago, United States.
- Gengler, Justin J. (30 June 2013). "Royal Factionalism, the Khawalid, and the Securitization of 'the Shīʿa Problem' in Bahrain". Journal of Arabian Studies: Arabia, the Gulf, and the Red Sea. 3 (1): 53–79. doi:10.1080/21534764.2013.802944. S2CID 145223193. (subscription required)
- Field, Michael (March 2013). "Tree of Al-Khalifa". Arabian Charts. (subscription required)
- Qubain, Fahim I. (1955). "Social Classes and Tensions in Bahrain". Middle East Journal. 9 (3): 269–280. JSTOR 4322721. (subscription required)
- Abdo, Geneive (10 April 2013). "The New Sectarianism: The Arab Uprisings and the Rebirth of the Shi'a-Sunni Divide" (PDF). Saban Center for Middle East Policy. Washington, D.C., United States: Brookings Institution. Archived from the original (PDF) on 9 June 2013.
- al-Jamri, Mansoor (November 2010). "Shia and the State in Bahrain: Integration and Tension" (PDF). Alternative Politics (1). Archived from the original (PDF) on 27 September 2013.
- Fuccaro, Nelida (11 April 2007). "Understanding the urban history of Bahrain". Middle East Critique. 9 (17): 49–81. doi:10.1080/10669920008720168. S2CID 144244393. (subscription required)
- Kinninmont, Jane (28 February 2011). "Bahrain's Re-Reform Movement". Foreign Affairs.
- Onley, James (2005). "Britain's Informal Empire in the Gulf, 1820–1971". Journal of Social Affairs.
- Onley, James (March 2009). "The Raj Reconsidered: British India's Informal Empire and Spheres of Influence in Asia and Africa". Asian Affairs. 40 (1): 44–62. doi:10.1080/03068370802658666. S2CID 162217901.
- Onley, James (2004). "The Politics of Protection in the Gulf: The Arab Rulers and the British Resident in the Nineteenth Century". New Arabian Studies.
- Liebesny, Herbert J. (1956). "Administration and Legal Development in Arabia: The Persian Gulf Principalities". Middle East Journal. 10 (1): 33–42. JSTOR 4322771. (subscription required)
- al-Mdaires, Falah (2002). "Shicism and Political Protest in Bahrain". Digest of Middle East Studies. 11: 20–44. doi:10.1111/j.1949-3606.2002.tb00440.x. (subscription required)
- Humaidan, Ahmed (18 January 2011). "Britain, Reforms and the National Union Organisation" (PDF). Bahrain History. Archived from the original (PDF) on 4 October 2012.
- Bambery, Chris (5 October 2012). "Bahrain, British Imperialism". Bahrain Centre for Studies in London.
- Gengler, Justin J. (2011). Ethnic Conflict and Political Mobilization in Bahrain and the Arab Gulf (PDF) (Ph.D.). University of Michigan.
- Schumacher, Ilsa Amelia (June 1987). Ritual devotion among Shi'i in Bahrain (Ph.D.). University of London. (registration required)
- Al Qassim, Waheed (2007). An analysis of Bahrain's reform process, 1999-2005: Elite driven reform, developmental challenges, and strategic opportunities (Ph.D.). Durham University.
- Hashim, Saeed Khalil (March 1984). The influence of Iraq on the nationalist movements of Kuwait and Bahrain 1920-1961 (Ph.D.). University of Exeter. (registration required)
- Hamza, Manaf Yousuf (April 2003). Land registration in Bahrain : its past, present and future within an integrated GIS environment (Ph.D.). University of East London. (registration required)
- Littlefield, Richard E. (1964). Bahrain as a Persian Gulf State: With References to Its Relations with Great Britain and the Province of Al-Hasa (M.Sc. thesis). Beirut, Lebanon: American University of Beirut.
- Almahmood, Mahmood (9 May 2013). The rise and fall of Bahrain's merchants in the pre-oil era (PDF) (M.Sc. thesis). American University. Archived from the original (PDF) on 10 June 2015.
- Baumgartner, Andreas (October 2008). Bahrain - a showcase for political reform in the Middle East? (PDF) (M.Sc. thesis). University of Vienna.

Arabic

- al-Shehabi, Saeed (1996). البحرين 1920–1971: قراءة في الوثائق البريطانية [Bahrain 1920–1971: A read in the British records] (in Arabic) (first ed.). Beirut, Lebanon: Dār al-Kunūz al-Adabīyah.
- Al Tajir, Mohammed Ali (1994) [Written in early 1940s]. Bashmi, Ibrahim (ed.). عقد اللآل في تاريخ أوال [The string of pearls in the history of Awal] (in Arabic). Al Ayam Foundation for Press, Printing and Publishing.
- Al-Hassan, Hamza (2010). الشيعة في المملكة العربية السعودية: الجزء الثاني، العهد السعودي 1913-1991 [Shia in the Kingdom of Saudi Arabia: Part II, The Saudi Era 1913-1991] (in Arabic). Beirut, Lebanon: Dar Al Saqi. ISBN 9781855166035.
- Al Sha'er, Sawsan Ali; Jassim, Mohammed Abdulqader (2000). البحرين... قصة الصراع السياسي 1904–1956 [Bahrain... story of the political struggle 1904–1956] (in Arabic).
- Al Khalifa, Mai Mohammed (1998). سبزآباد ورجال الدولة البهية - قصة السيطرة البريطانية على الخليج العربي [Sabzabad and the glorious state - The story of British control over the Arabian Gulf] (in Arabic). المؤسسة العربية للدراسات والنشر والتوزيع.
- Khayri, Nasir bin Jawher bin Mubarak (2003) [Written in early 1920s]. al-Shuqair, Abdulrahman bin Abdulla (ed.). قلائد النحرين في تاريخ البحرين [Pendants of sacrifices in the history of Bahrain] (in Arabic). Manama, Bahrain: Al Ayam Foundation for Press, Printing and Publishing. ISBN 9789990102604.
- Abdulla, Mohammed Ahmed; Zain al-'Abdeen, Bashir (2009). تاريخ البحرين الحديث (1500–2002) [Modern History of Bahrain (1500–2002)] (in Arabic). Bahrain: Historical Studies Centre, University of Bahrain. ISBN 978-99901-06-75-6.
- Kadhim, Nader (2007). طبائع الاستملاك: قراءة في أمراض الحالة البحرينية [The Nature of Possessiveness: A Study in the Pathology of the Bahraini Condition] (in Arabic). Institute of Arab Research and Studies & Ministry of Information of Bahrain. ISBN 978-99901-90-56-4.
- Kadhim, Nader (April 2008) [First published March 2008]. استعمالات الذاكرة: في مجتمع تعددي مبتلى بالتاريخ [Uses of Memory: In a Multicultural Society Burdened by History] (in Arabic) (2nd ed.). Fakhrawi bookshop. ISBN 978-99901-536-2-0.
- al-Nabhani, Mohammad Khalifa (1999) [First published 1923]. التحفة النبهانية في تاريخ الجزيرة العربية [The Nabhani's Marvel in the History of Arabian Peninsula] (in Arabic). Beirut, Lebanon: Dar Ihya' Al Ulum Publishings.
- al-Murshid, Abbas (13 December 2009). في الرد على دراسة تقسيم البحرين طائفيا [In reply to Bahrain sectarian division study] (in Arabic). Al-Jareesh Years.
- Al-Hulaibi, Fadhel (28 March 2013). محطات مضيئة في تاريخ الحركة الوطنية البحرينية [Bright stations in the history of the National Movement of Bahrain] (in Arabic). Progressive Democratic Tribune.
- Al-Othman, Mohammed (14 April 2007). بيت "آل مهزع" وشيء عن المنامة والمحرق [The House of al-Mihza and few things about Manama and Muharraq] (in Arabic). Al-Wasat (Bahraini newspaper).
- al-Jamri, Mansoor (10 January 2002). قراءة معاصرة في تاريخ البحرين [Contemporary reading in the history of Bahrain]. Al-Wasat (in Arabic). Bani Jamra, Bahrain.
- Anonymous (5 April 2005). من تاريخ وزارة الداخلية [From the History of Ministry of Interior]. Al-Wasat (in Arabic).
- Esmail, Hussain (11 January 2003). قصص من ماضي البحرين: هدّة الغاصة [Stories from the history of Bahrain: the divers' uprising]. Al-Wasat (in Arabic). Barbar, Bahrain.
- Al-Bilad (8 May 2009). "مركز الدراسات التاريخية" يطلق "تاريخ البحرين الحديث 1500 – 2002" [The Center for Historical Studies lunches "Modern History of Bahrain 1500 - 2002"] (in Arabic).
