= Isa bin Ali Al Khalifa =

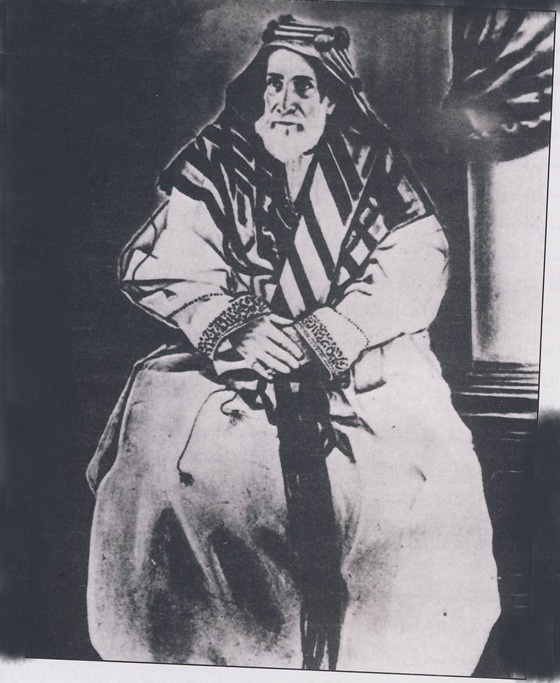
- Sheikh Isa in early 1900s (the first Hakim of Bahrain to be photographed)

Hakim of Bahrain
- Reign: 2 December 1869 – 9 December 1932
- Predecessor: Ali bin Khalifa Al Khalifa
- Successor: Hamad bin Isa Al Khalifa
- Born: 27 November 1848, 1 Muharram 1265 AH; Riffa Fort, Bahrain
- Died: 9 December 1932 (aged 84); Muharraq, Bahrain
- Burial: Al Muharraq Cemetery
- Issue: Sheikh Salman bin Isa; Hamad bin Isa, Hakim of Bahrain; Sheikh Rashid bin Isa; Sheikh Mohammed bin Isa; Sheikh Abdullah bin Isa; Sheikha Noora bint Isa; Sheikha Muneera bint Isa; Sheikha Moza bint Isa
- House: Khalifa
- Father: Ali bin Khalifa Al Khalifa
- Mother: Thajba bint Ahmad bin Salman Al Khalifa

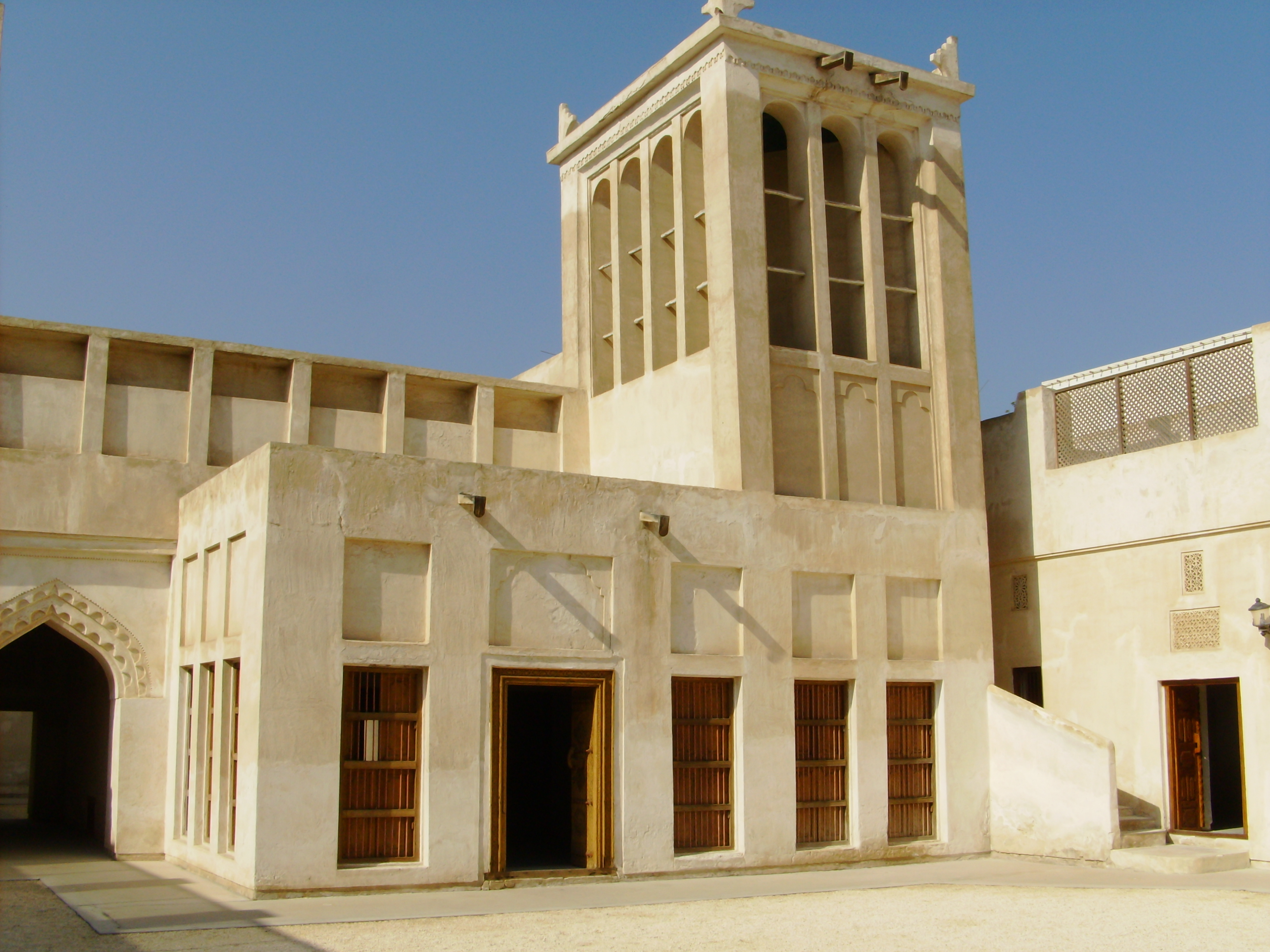
Isa bin Ali House, residence of the former ruler in Muharraq

Isa bin Ali Al Khalifa KCIE CSI (1848 – 9 December 1932) was the ruler of Bahrain from 1869 until his death. His title was Hakim of Bahrain. He is one of the longest reigning monarchs of the region, a reign lasting 63 years. He was forced by the British political advisor, Clive Kirkpatrick Daly, to abdicate in 1923, although this "abdication" was never recognised by Bahrainis who considered his successor and son Hamad only as a vice-ruler until Isa's death in 1932.

== Biography ==
Isa ibn Ali Al Khalifa was born on 27 November 1848, in Riffa Fort, Bahrain, the fourth-born son of Sheikh Ali bin Khalifa Al Khalifa with Sheikha Tajba bint Ahmad Al Khalifa, daughter of Sheikh Ahmad bin Salman Al Khalifa.

Sheikh Isa's father, Sheikh Ali, became the ruler of Bahrain in 1868 after his brother Muhammad bin Khalifa Al Khalifa was forced to abdicate by the British after an alleged violation of the 1861 treaty which prevented him from carrying out maritime depredations. In August 1869, a large force led by Nasir bin Mubarak invaded Bahrain and killed Isa's father, Sheikh Ali. Nasir's cousin, Mohammed bin Abdullah, usurped the throne after the murder and assumed the Sheikhdom. Sheikh Isa fled to Zubarah, to be treated by the Al Noaim tribe who remained loyal to his rule. In December 1869, a British force under the Political Resident Lewis Pelly with the will and desire of the people of Bahrain, Sheikh Isa arrived and deposed the usurper who was captured by the British and sent to prison in India where he died a captive in 1877. Sheikh Isa ruled from 2 December 1869.

On 22 December 1880, Isa concluded a protectorate treaty with the United Kingdom to abstain from making any treaties or engagements with any other foreign power or state without British consent. Isa became sole ruler on the death of his brother in October 1888, when his title was altered from Chief to Ruler of Bahrain (Hakim). The protectorate treaty was confirmed and extended on 13 March 1892, in which Isa also reiterating his desire to retain for himself the right to manage Bahrain's internal affairs. Under these treaties, the United Kingdom managed all of Bahrain's foreign policy and in this way Isa was not authorized to conclude treaties independently with other powers. Sheikh Isa successfully fought off with the assistance of his brother Sheikh Khalid bin Ali, a maritime force of the Al Binali tribe which attempted unsuccessfully in invading the Bahrain islands in 1895.

Isa was forced by the British political advisor, Clive Kirkpatrick Daly, to abdicate in 1923, although this "abdication" was never recognised by Bahrainis who considered his successor Hamad only as a viceruler until Isa's death in 1932. From 1926, at an old age, Isa was joined by a British consultant, Charles Belgrave, who helped him implement administrative reforms aimed at promoting social progress as laws for the regulation of pearl fishing, traditionally one of the main parts of the local economy.

Sheikh Isa died while praying the dawn prayers in his room in Muharraq on 9 December 1932 after a reign of 63 years, and was buried at Al Muharaq cemetery. His was the longest reign in Bahrain’s history, as well as one of the most long-lived rulers in the world. He was officially succeeded by his second-born son Hamad bin Isa Al Khalifa, his eldest son of eight having died in 1893.

== Family ==
Isa had four wives:

- (first) Sheikha Haya bint Muhammad Al Khalifa, daughter of Sheikh Muhammad bin Salman bin Ahmad Al Khalifa, the divorced wife of his younger brother, Sheikh Ahmad bin ‘Ali Al Khalifa.
- (second) Seikha Maryam bint Hamad al-Benali (fl 1951), daughter of Sheikh Hamad bin 'Ali al-Benali.
- (third) Sheikha Munira bint 'Abdu'l Razak Al Khalifa, daughter of Sheikh 'Abd'ul Razak Al Khalifa.
- (fourth) Sheikha Aisha bint Muhammad Al Khalifa (died at Muharraq, 26 December 1943), daughter of Sheikh Muhammad bin Khalifa Al Khalifa, Ruler of Bahrain, by his seventh wife, Aisha al-Jalhama.

Isa had five sons:

- Sheikh Salman bin Isa al-Khalifa al-Haj (1873–1893), born at Manama, son of Haya. Died while returning from the Hajj, near Riyadh, Arabia.
- Sheikh Hamad bin Isa al-Khalifa (1875–1942), Ruler of Bahrain, son of Haya.
- Sheikh Rashid bin Isa al-Khalifa (1877–1902), born at Manama in 1877, son of Haya. Died from consumption.
- Shaikh Muhammad bin Isa al-Khalifa al-Haj (1878 – 10 November, 1964), born at Manama, son of Maryam.
- Sheikh 'Abdu'llah bin Isa al-Khalifa (1883 – 23 April, 1966), born at Muharraq, son of Aisha.

and four daughters:

- Sheikha Noora bint Isa al-Khalifa. Married Sheikh Ibrahim bin Khalid al-Khalifa (1873–1933), eldest son of Sheikh Khalid bin 'Ali al-Khalifa.
- Sheikha … bint Isa al-Khalifa. Married (first) Sheikh 'Ali bin Ahmad al-Khalifa, son of Sheikh Ahmad bin 'Ali al-Khalifa, and (second) September 1917, Sheikh Salman bin Khalid al-Khalifa, a cousin.
- Sheikha Moza bint Isa al-Khalifa, wife of Sheikh Ali bin Ahmed Al Khalifa.
- Sheikha Munira bint Isa al-Khalifa, daughter of Munira. Married Sheikh Khalifa bin Ahmad al-Khalifa (1875–??), son of her paternal uncle, Sheikh Ahmad bin 'Ali al-Khalifa al-Haj.

== Honours ==
- Style of Excellency – 1909
- Personal 11-gun salute – 1909
- Companion of the Order of the Star of India (CSI) – 1914
- Knight Commander of the Order of the Indian Empire (KCIE) – 1919
- Style of Highness – 1930

== See also ==
- Al Khalifa
- History of Bahrain
- Bahrain administrative reforms of the 1920s
- List of longest reigning monarchs of all time

Regnal titles
Preceded by Muhammad bin Khalifa Al Khalifa	Hakim of Bahrain; 1869–1923	Succeeded by Hamad bin Isa Al Khalifa
