= Hamad bin Isa Al Khalifa (1872–1942) =

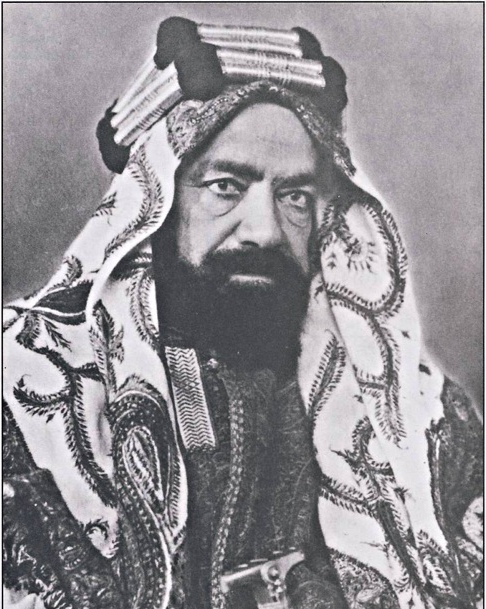
- Sheikh Hamad, 1930s

Hakim of Bahrain
- Reign: 9 December 1932 – 20 February 1942
- Inauguration: 9 February 1933
- Predecessor: Isa bin Ali Al Khalifa
- Successor: Salman bin Hamad Al Khalifa
- Born: 1874; Muharraq, Bahrain
- Died: 20 February 1942 (aged 70); Al Rumaitha, Bahrain
- Burial: 20 February 1942; Al Rifa'a Cemetery
- Spouse: Shaikha Aysha bint Ali Al Khalifa; Lulwa Al Jalahma; Shaikha Aysha bint Rashid Al Khalifa; Shaikha Thajba bint Salman bin Duaij Al Khalifa
- House: Khalifa
- Father: Isa bin Ali Al Khalifa
- Mother: Haya bint Muhammad bin Salman Al Khalifa
- Religion: Sunni Islam

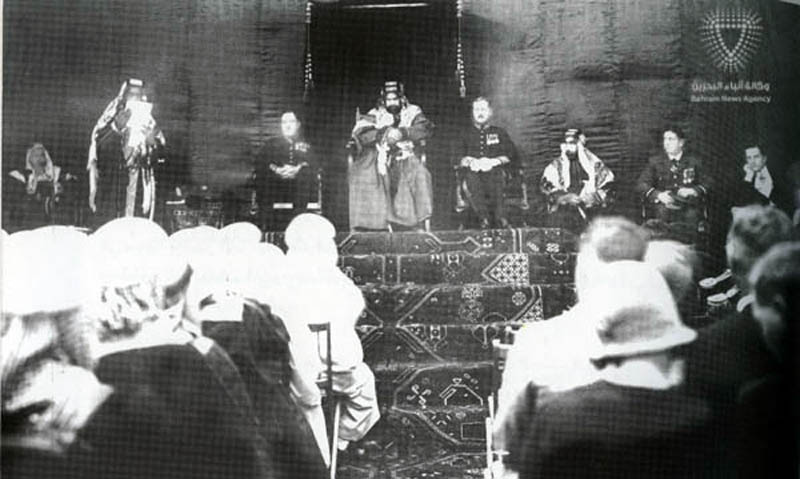
Inauguration of Hamad bin Isa Al Khalifa as the Hakim of Bahrain in February 1933

Hamad bin Isa Al Khalifa KCIE, CSI (6 February 1872 – 20 February 1942) was the Hakim (ruler) of Bahrain from the death of his father, Isa bin Ali, on 9 December 1932 until his own death in 1942.

== Biography ==
Hamad was born on 6 February 1872, the second-born of Sheikh Isa bin Ali Al Khalifa's eight sons (his elder brother predeceased him in 1893), and received a private education.

On 26 May 1923, Shaikh Hamad was officially proclaimed Deputy Ruler. On 9 December 1932 he succeeded his father on the throne of Bahrain and his appointment was made official on 9 February 1933.

He lived in the Al-Sakhir Palace from around 1925 until his death.

He died on 20 February 1942 in Al Rumaitha, Bahrain, and was buried in the Al Hunaynya Cemetery next to his ancestor Shaikh Salman bin Ahmed Al Khalifa.

== Political training and reign ==
=== Hamad and the British advisor ===
While the Persian Gulf Residency was in charge of the external representation of the Emirates in the Gulf, an advisor was assigned to assist the Sheikh in managing the affairs of his Emirate. In 1926, Charles Belgrave was appointed the government advisor due to the unrest prevailing since 1919 over the application in Bahrain of the civil and criminal laws of the British Raj. Faced with this violence, then Commissioner Sir Clive Kirkpatrick Daly had forced Sheikh Isa to abdicate in 1923. The Raj withdrew Major Daly from Bahrain in 1926 and invited Hamad to take over as vice-ruler and appoint an advisor. Thus, Belgrave helped establish municipal government. Starting as an economic advisor, he soon became a political, military, and judicial one as well, commanding the police, judiciary, health, customers, public works, and parks departments. Although Belgrave's many duties spread him quite thin, he did manage to produce improvements in education, surveying, and internal security, serving until 1957.

=== Hamad’s reign and the age of oil ===
During King Hamad's reign, the search for oil began under the aegis of the Bahrain Petroleum Company (Bapco), and in 1932 the first oil well on the western side of the Persian Gulf began production. He had already established the first customs office in Manama as crown prince in 1917, and in 1923 he built a port for 5,000 rupees and appointed British customers officer Claude de Grenier as Director. In 1941, a bridge was opened between Manama and Muharraq Island. Dealing with international conflicts in the region, Hamad developed electricity, water, health, and education in his territory during his reign.

== Family ==
Hamad married four times.

- (first) Shaikha Aisha bint Ali bin Mohamed Al Khalifa, a granddaughter of Bahrain's Ruler Shaikh Mohamed bin Khalifa (1843–1868).
- (second) Shaikha Lulwa bint Abdulla bin Sulayman Al Jalahma.
- (third) Shaikha Aysha bint Rashid bin Mohamed Al Khalifa (her father Shaikh Rashid died in 1947, she died in 1953).
- (fourth) Shaikha Thajba bint Salman bin Duaij Al Khalifa (her father was Shaikh Isa bin Ali's cousin and slain in Dhahran by the Al Murrah tribe in December 1900, her mother is Latifa bint Mubarak Al Fadhel).

From these unions Hamad had a total of ten children:

- Salman bin Hamad (1894–1961)
- Ali (1896–1997)
- Rashid (?–1916)
- Mubarak (1910–1977)
- Abdullah (1915 – 23 July 1973)
- Duaij (1917–April 1969)
- Ahmed (1918–1985)
- Khalifa (1912–April 1984)
- Ibrahim (1913–1972)

== See also ==
- Al Khalifa
- History of Bahrain
- Bahrain administrative reforms of the 1920s

Regnal titles
Preceded by Isa bin Ali Al Khalifa	Hakim of Bahrain; 1932–1942	Succeeded by Salman bin Hamad Al Khalifa
