= Mohammed bin Salman Al Khalifa =

Son of Salman bin Hamad Al Khalifa

Mohammed bin Salman Al Khalifa (Arabic: محمد بن سلمان آل خليفة; 1940 – 9 November 2009) was the youngest of three sons of the hakim of Bahrain, Salman bin Hamad Al Khalifa. His eldest brother, Isa bin Salman Al Khalifa, succeeded as hakim (later emir), and his other late brother, Khalifa bin Salman Al Khalifa, was the prime minister. Mohammed was uncle to the reigning king, Hamad bin Isa Al Khalifa.

Mohammed served as minister in charge of education and customs administration. He also served as the Chief of Police and Public Security from 1961 to 1966, and was the private owner of Umm as Sabaan island. He was an active sponsor of sporting events, and he raised camels, horses and falcons.

== Family ==
Mohammed was married to Sheikha Noora Al Khalifa and Shaikha bint Khalifa bin Ahmad al-Mubarak ِAl Bin Ali. He had 11 sons and six daughters. His sons are:

- Ahmad bin Mohammad Al Khalifa
- Hamad bin Mohammad Al Khalifa
- Khalid bin Mohammad Al Khalifa
- Khalifa bin Mohammad Al Khalifa
- Salman bin Mohammed Al Khalifa
- Abdullah bin Mohammad Al Khalifa
- Sultan bin Mohammad Al Khalifa
- Hashim bin Mohammad Al Khalifa
  - Mohammad bin Hashim Al Khalifa
  - Hamad bin Hashim Al Khalifa
- Nadir bin Mohammad Al Khalifa
- Ali bin Mohammad Al Khalifa
