= Salman bin Hamad Al Khalifa (born 1894) =

Ruler of Bahrain (1894–1961)

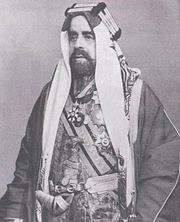
- Formal portrait, c. 1942–1961

Hakim of Bahrain
- Reign: 20 February 1942 – 2 November 1961
- Predecessor: Hamad bin Isa Al Khalifa
- Successor: Isa bin Salman Al Khalifa
- Born: 10 October 1894; Muharraq, Bahrain
- Died: 2 November 1961 (aged 67); Safra, Bahrain
- Burial: Honaynaiya Cemetery, Rifa'a
- Issue: Isa bin Salman, Hakim of Bahrain; Sheikh Khalifa bin Salman; Sheikh Mohammed bin Salman; Sheikha Fatima bint Salman; Sheikha Aysha bint Salman; Sheikha Noura bint Salman; Sheikha Thajba bint Salman; Sheikha Shaikha bint Salman; Sheikha Maryam bint Salman
- House: Khalifa
- Father: Hamad bin Isa, Hakim of Bahrain
- Mother: Shaikha Aysha bint Ali Al Khalifa

Salman bin Hamad Al Khalifa, KCMG, KCIE, KStJ (10 October 1894 – 2 November 1961) was the ruler of Bahrain from the death of his father Hamad bin Isa al-Khalifa on 20 February 1942 until his own death in 1961. His title was Hakim of Bahrain. He was succeeded by his son Isa bin Salman Al Khalifa in December 1961.

== Biography ==
=== Early life and education ===
Sheikh Salman bin Hamad was born in 1895 and was raised under his father's care. He studied the Quran and other religious subjects while his father, Hamad bin Isa al-Khalifa, brought him tutors in various other subjects.

He was approved as heir by his father and other nobles and members of the House of Al Khalifa. He represented his father on many official occasions during the latter's lifetime.

=== Health and education improvements ===
King Salman bin Hamad likely became interested in health issues when he familiarized himself with the many diseases to which those in the pearl hunting trade were vulnerable. Against resistance from the traditional elite, he promoted reforms to the pearl divers’ labor conditions, starting with the first specialist clinics to deal with their occupational health. Keen to invest more in health care, he pushed to boost funding for local hospitals. Most of his work was behind the scenes, but he did state in November 1951 for the third annual medical conference of the Gulf states that:

Although Bahrain's hospitals were burdened by care for the personnel of the British Royal Air Force and Royal Navy, direct contact with an RAF doctor and four nurses at the main hospital improved the standard of care.

Salman believed that better health was only, in the end, possible through better education. In addition, the youth needed to be educated to maximize jobs transfer in the petroleum industry to Bahraini citizens. Although Chief Advisor Sir Charles Belgrave was reluctant to endorse a welfare state, the introduction to the annual report of the surgeon-general in the last year of Salman's rule (after the King had suffered a severe heart attack) stated that "the most important reform ever of the Health Administration was the King’s offering free health care to citizens and visitors alike early this year."

=== Economy ===
Sheikh Salman was intensely interested in economic matters. He personally reviewed the annual budget, but went beyond mere auditing in raising concerns with skeptical advisers over the oil revenue quota system. At the time, the state's refineries were contractually allowed to refine foreign oil duty-free, which he saw as a threat to the nation's long-term fortunes. In addition, he noticed an obscure 1914 provision in land law that allowed airports and therefore the basis for an airline, long given a backseat to maritime transit. Gulf Air would be founded during his term.

=== Attitude toward the Arab-Israeli conflict ===
Sheikh Salman founded a committee to collect donations for Palestinians expected to be expelled in the wake of the 1947 passage of the United Nations Partition Plan for Palestine, ultimately raising 66,000 rupees in addition to other pledges and in-kind help. The Supreme Muslim Council stopped by Bahrain among other Arab countries on a tour to mobilize Arab support in 1948. A second round of donations spearheaded by Sheikh Abdullah bin Isa Al Khalifa collected 105,000 rupees for conversion into Iraqi dinars, which he sent to Syrian President of Syria Shukri al-Quwatli for distribution to Palestinian refugees there. In less than fifteen days, Sheikh Salman ordered another big drive among Bahraini merchants, collecting 77,000 rupees at a massive conference on 27 March 1948. Finally, in the wake of the displacement of tens of thousands of Palestinians after the 1948 Arab–Israeli War, Sheikh Salman directly donated 100,000 rupees to the UNRWA, the local United Nations relief organization.

=== Sanitation and public health ===
In early November 1948, the first medical regional medical conference was held with 27 doctors from Britain, the United States, Iran, Iraq, and Kuwait. A report was drafted by a committee of six doctors there on the health situation in the Gulf states for perusal by the local government officials.

On 11 December 1948, the first water meters began operating in the country after having been installed at a cost of 225 rupees per 100 feet from the main pipeline and delivering water at a cost of 3 paise per 100,000 gallons. Sheikh Salman personally pressed the button to begin water delivery at a ceremony with Peter Holloway of contractor Holloway Brothers (London).

=== Death ===
Sheikh Salman maintained a demanding schedule, awaking at 8:00 to go to his office in the Bab Al Bahrain. After sipping Arabic coffee, he greeted waiting citizens and discussed their petitions, then began his official schedule of interviews, meetings, daily surveys, and letters. He refused to yield to doctors’ advice to rest more in his old age, but acquiesced to his sons Isa and Khalifa's urging to convalesce in the Safra neighborhood where they could relay information in and orders out. He died on 2 November 1961, at the age of 67 after a reign of almost 20 years.

== Family ==
Salman married three times:

- (first) 1910, Shaikha Latifa bint Ibrahim al-Khalifa, daughter of Shaikh Ibrahim bin Khalid al-Khalifa, by his wife, Shaikha Noora bint Isa al-Khalifa.
- (second) at al-Jasra, October 1931, Shaikha Mouza bint Hamad al-Khalifa (died 2 May 2011), daughter of Shaikh Hamad bin Abdullah al-Khalifa, of al-Jasra.
- (third) Around 1922, Shaikha Nayla bint Khalifa bin Ahmed Al Khalifa (died 1972).

He had three sons and six daughters:

- Isa bin Salman Al Khalifa (1931–1999)
- Khalifa bin Salman Al Khalifa (1935–2020)
- Mohammed bin Salman Al Khalifa (1940–2009)
- Thajba bint Salman Al Khalifa (born 1945)
- Fatima bint Salman Al Khalifa (1923–1999) mother of Sabika
- Maryam bint Salman Al Khalifa (born 1949)
- Aisha bint Salman Al Khalifa (1937–2019)
- Sheikha bint Salman Al Khalifa (1947–2022)
- Nura bint Salman Al Khalifa (born 27 February 1942 - October 2023)

He died at Safra, Bahrain, on 2 November 1961 and is buried in Honaynaiya cemetery, Rifa’a.

== Honours ==
- Knight Commander of the Order of the Indian Empire (KCIE; 1943)
- Knight Commander of the Order of St Michael and St George (KCMG; 1952)
- Grand Cordon of the Order of the Two Rivers, 1st Class of the Kingdom of Iraq, 1952
- Queen Elizabeth II Coronation Medal, 2 June 1953
- Grand Cross of the Order of the Dannebrog of Denmark, 1957
- Knight of the Order of St John (KStJ; 1956)

== See also ==
- Al Khalifa
- History of Bahrain

Regnal titles
Preceded by Hamad bin Isa Al Khalifa	Hakim of Bahrain; 1942–1961	Succeeded by Isa bin Salman Al Khalifa
