= Torture in Bahrain =

Torture in Bahrain refers to the violation of Bahrain's obligations as a state party to the United Nations Convention against Torture and Other Cruel, Inhuman or Degrading Treatment or Punishment (Convention against Torture) and other international treaties and disregard for the prohibition of torture enshrined in Bahraini law.

Torture was routine practice in Bahrain between 1975 and 1999, during the period when the State Security Act 1974 was in force. Individuals have been tortured after being detained at demonstrations and public gatherings. On 17 December 2007 on Martyrs' Day, commemorating past victims of torture, the Special Security Forces began a wave of arrests targeting more than 60 persons, among them over ten activists. During February 2009, several key human rights defenders in Bahrain were arbitrarily arrested and detained.

The issue of immunity for past violations has also been a continuing concern. In 2001, Hamad bin Isa Al Khalifa pardoned all those involved in the political violence of the 1990s, freeing hundreds of prisoners. In 2002 Royal Decree 56 established the clarification that amnesty was also granted to all state security officers who may have committed human rights abuses prior to 2001. In 2005 the United Nations Committee against Torture, expressing concern over the failure to investigate allegations and a pattern of impunity for torturers, referred specifically to the Decree 56 amnesty. Nevertheless, the Decree has not been amended.

== The State Security Act era ==
Torture was particularly endemic in Bahrain between 1974 and 1999, when the State Security Act 1974 (Note: This led the government to dissolve the assembly in order to enact the State Security Laws. In essence this was the root cause of human rights violations within Bahrain during the last 20 or so years. US Department of State, Bahrain Country Report on Human Rights Practices for 2001 supra, p. 1; Foreign and Commonwealth Office, Foreign Policy: Regional Country Profiles – Bahrain, p. 2; Amnesty International report: "Bahrain Violations of Human Rights" 9 May 1991, p. 4.) was in force prior to the accession of King Hamad. The Act, formally scrapped in 2001, contained measures permitting the government to arrest and imprison individuals without trial for up to three years for crimes relating to state security. Other measures associated with the 1974 Act, such as the establishment of State Security Courts, added to the conditions conducive to the practice of torture.

Torture appears to have been most prevalent during the 1990s Uprising, between 1994 and 1997 when demands for the return of the liberal Constitution of 1973 and Parliamentary were made in two public petitions to the Emir. (Note: Hansard 3 June 1997, Motion concerning Bahrain: question posed by George Gallaway and responded to by Derek Fatchett, Minister of State, Foreign and Commonwealth Office, pp. 1, 3; HRW: ‘Routine Abuse, Routine Denial Civil Rights and the Political Crisis in Bahrain’, p. 29.) Individuals associated with the petitions were deemed to be acting against the regime and detained under the State Security Laws, subjected to torture and in some cases forced into exile. (Note: US Department of State, Bahrain Country Report on Human Rights Practices for 2001; Amnesty International report: "Bahrain Violations of Human Rights" p. 3; US Department of State, Bahrain Country Report on Human Rights Practices for 1996, p. 3.)

Bahrain's track record of gross violations of human rights and torture has been raised on numerous occasions in various UN fora. Bahrain was one of the countries subjected to the UNHCHR 1503 procedure (Note: From 1991 to 1993, 47th-49th session, see Office of the High Commissioner for Human Rights, States examined under the 1503 procedure Archived 26 September 2007 at the Wayback Machine by the Commission on Human Rights (as up to 2003).) and has been the subject of a resolution by the Sub-Commission on Prevention of Discrimination and Protection of Minorities (Note: Situation of human rights in Bahrain, Sub-commission resolution 1997/2, adopted at the 24th meeting, 21 August 1997, in which the Sub-Commission noted "the information concerning a serious deterioration of the human rights situation in Bahrain, including discrimination against the Shi’a population, extrajudicial killings, persistent use of torture in Bahraini prisons on a large scale as well as the abuse of women and children who are detained, and arbitrary detention without trial or access by detainees to legal advice" and expressed "its deep concern about the alleged gross and systematic violations of human rights in Bahrain.") and urgent appeals from the Special Rapporteur on Torture and the Working Group on Arbitrary Detention. (Note: See e.g. UN Doc. E/CN.4/1996/35, 9 January 1996, para.33; UN Doc. E/CN.4/1998/38, 24 December 1997, para.24 and Opinion No.15/1997 of the Working Group on Arbitrary Detention, UN Doc. E/CN.4/1998/44/Add.1, 3 November 1998.) The Special Rapporteur summed up the practice of torture during this period in his 1997 report to the UN Human Rights Commission:

Most persons arrested for political reasons in Bahrain were held incommunicado, a condition of detention conducive to torture. The Security and Intelligence Service (SIS) and the Criminal Investigation Department (CID) were alleged frequently to conduct interrogation of such detainees under torture. The practice of torture by these agencies was said to be undertaken with impunity, with no known cases of officials having been prosecuted for acts of torture or other ill-treatment. In cases heard before the State Security Court, defendants were reportedly convicted solely on the basis of uncorroborated confessions made to political or security officials or on the testimony of such officials that confessions had been made. Although defendants often alleged that their "confessions" had been extracted under torture, impartial investigations of such claims were reportedly never ordered by the court. In addition, medical examinations of defendants were rarely ordered by the court, unless the defendant displayed obvious signs of injury. Such outward displays of injury were said to be uncommon, since torture victims were usually brought to trial well after their injuries had healed.

In addition to its use as a means to extract a "confession", torture was also reportedly administered to force detainees to sign statements pledging to renounce their political affiliation, to desist from future anti-government activity, to coerce the victim into reporting on the activities of others, to inflict punishment and to instil fear in political opponents. The methods of torture reported include: falaqa (beatings on the soles of the feet); severe beatings, sometimes with hose-pipes; suspension of the limbs in contorted positions accompanied by blows to the body; enforced prolonged standing; sleep deprivation; preventing victims from relieving themselves; immersion in water to the point of near drowning; burnings with cigarettes; piercing the skin with a drill; sexual assault, including the insertion of objects into the penis or anus; threats of execution or of harm to family members; and placing detainees suffering from sickle cell anaemia (said to be prevalent in the country) in air-conditioned rooms in the winter, which can lead to injury to internal organs. (Note: Fifty-third session, Item 8(a) of the provisional agenda UN Doc. E/CN.4/1997/7, 10 January 1997, para 26; see also US Department of State, Bahrain Country Report on Human Rights Practices for 2001, p. 1; Amnesty International report: "Bahrain Violations of Human Rights" Summary, p. 2; and Report of the Working Group on Arbitrary Detention – Visit to Bahrain, para 90 according to which prisons are no longer overcrowded and conditions of detention are satisfactory. UN Doc.E/CN.4/2002/77/Add.2.)

== Repeal of the State Security Law ==
After the Emir Sheikh Hamad bin Isa Al Khalifa succeeded his father Sheikh Isa Bin Sulman Al Khalifa in 1999, the use of torture appeared to decline dramatically. Only isolated incidents were reported and conditions of detention improved. (Note: US Department of State, Bahrain Country Report on Human Rights Practices for 2001, and Working group on arbitrary detention, para 90.) This was attributed to the introduction of crucial reforms. (Note: The most significant change has been the repeal of the State Security Law. This has included the abolition in February 2001 of the State Security Court which held secret trials with few procedural guarantees. In addition to this, the Emir granted an amnesty to all political prisoners held under the State Security laws other than life-threatening offences pursuant to articles 333 and 336 of the Criminal Code. This resulted in the release of a large number of detainees and the return of many Bahrainis living in exile and the cancellation of international search warrants. For further information on reforms, see, REDRESS. Reparation for Torture: A Survey of Law and Practice in 30 Selected Countries (Bahrain Country Report), May 2003, available at: "Archived copy" (PDF). Archived from the original (PDF) on 19 August 2006..) In October 2001, the Working Group on Arbitrary Detention visited Bahrain for the first time. Although it confirmed the condemnatory decisions and opinions it had previously made in relation to the state security laws with further investigations, it congratulated Bahrain on "the decisive scale and scope of the reforms that have been undertaken and the accompanying acts of clemency" following the repeal of the State Security laws and the release of political prisoners. (Note: See Report of Working Group on Arbitrary Detention, in particular paras. 9 to 13.) It viewed the repeal of the state security laws as amounting to "a major political shift in favour of human rights". (Note: Report of Working Group on Arbitrary Detention, para. 18.) It also noted: "Not all the instruments currently in force are flawed, the problem lies rather in their practical application." (Note: Report of Working Group on Arbitrary Detention, para. 56.) Much depended on the willingness of the authorities to pursue the reform process and ensure that existing safeguards were effectively implemented in practice.

The royally-appointed Prime Minister, Shaikh Khalifah ibn Sulman al-Khalifah (uncle of the present King), head of government throughout the period when torture has been alleged to have taken place, continued in office until his death in 2020. Among individuals alleged to have committed, or overseen, torture are: Ian Henderson, Adel Flaifel, Khalid Al Wazzan, Abdulla Al Dowsari Sheikh Abdulaziz Ateyatallah Al-Khalifa, Alistair Bain McNutt. In March 2000, King Hamad awarded several of the accused torturers with the Order of Shaikh Isa bin Salman Al Khalifa medal.

== Decree 56 of 2002 ==
The state's obligation to provide an effective remedy and the need for torture survivors to receive compensation and other forms of reparation was stressed by the United Nations Working Group on Arbitrary Detention. (Note: Report of Working Group on Arbitrary Detention, para 28.) The views of civil society have also emphasised the need for effective and enforceable remedies for torture. (Note: Report of Working Group on Arbitrary Detention, para 24.)

No alleged perpetrator has been tried for torture or ill treatment despite the practice of torture in Bahrain during the 1980s and 1990s being well documented. (Note: US State Department Report 2001.) In one case in 2001, an individual who suffered torture while in police custody was reported to have been personally compensated by the Emir. In November 2002, 8 torture victims lodged complaints relating to their treatment with the Directorate of Public Prosecutions requesting effective investigation (Note: Open letter to the Ambassador of Bahrain dated 17 December 2002 from REDRESS, OMCT, APT FiACAT and IRCT.) and the prosecution of one of the alleged perpetrators, Adel Felaifel, who was already being investigated on relation to fraud and embezzlement charges. There have been numerous demonstrations and calls from the public for such a prosecution to be initiated. Nevertheless, no formal investigation of these cases has been reported and calls for the investigation and prosecution of such crimes has been met with stiff opposition from the Government.

Decree 56 of 2002, which purports to grant a blanket amnesty for any case (civil or criminal) lodged by persons accused of or convicted of "offences that endangered or pose a threat to state/national security" which fell within the jurisdiction of the State Security Court, effectively extends Decree 10/2001, the general amnesty of February 2001, to cover human rights violations committed by government and security officials as well as offences by political opponents of the government. (Note: Decree 56 provides that: "No lawsuit related to or result from crimes that were subject to general clemency will be heard in front of any judicial panel irrespective of the plaintiff’s person or position and the accused person, whether he was civilian, a civil employee, or a military officer who was directly involved in the crime or was a partner to the crime that occurred during the period the preceded the issuance of this decree.") It is direct contravention of the provision of Article 89 of the Penal Code that only allows amnesty laws which do "not affect third party rights", and contrary to the prohibition of torture by the National Charter, which provides that:

No person shall in any way be subjected to any kind of physical or moral torture, inhumane, humiliating indignant treatment...Law ensures punishment of those who commit an offence of torture, a physically or psychologically harmful act. (Note: Second – Protection of individual freedoms and equality of Chapter 1 Basic principles of society of the National Charter (para 2).)

Despite petitions to the King to repeal Decree, it remains in force.

== UN Committee against Torture's observations ==
At its 34th session in 2005, the UN Committee against Torture noted the failure of Bahrain to investigate allegations and a pattern of impunity for torturers, including the Decree 56 amnesty. In its concluding observations the Committee listed amongst its subjects of concern:

(f) The apparent failure to investigate promptly, impartially and fully the numerous

allegations of torture and ill-treatment and to prosecute alleged offenders, and in particular the pattern of impunity for torture and other ill-treatment committed by law enforcement personnel in the past;
(g) The blanket amnesty extended to all alleged perpetrators of torture or other crimes by Decree No. 56 of 2002 and the lack of redress available to victims of torture;
(h) The inadequate availability in practice of civil compensation and rehabilitation for

victims of torture prior to 2001.

The Committee recommended, among other things, that Bahrain:

(d) Consider steps to amend Decree No. 56 of 2002 to ensure that there is no impunity for officials who have perpetrated or acquiesced in torture or other cruel, inhuman or degrading treatment;
(e) Ensure that its legal system provides victims of past acts of torture with redress and an enforceable right to fair and adequate compensation.

== Revival of the use of torture after 2007 ==
A Human Rights Watch (HRW) report, "Torture Redux: The Revival of Physical Coercion during Interrogations in Bahrain", published in February 2010, concluded that although serious and systemic reports of torture and other ill-treatment in detention in Bahrain that were routine between 1975 and 1999 had become rare after 1999 (although serious abuse by security forces during arrests continued), reports of the use of torture and ill-treatment increased again after the end of 2007, coinciding with rising political tension and street demonstrations against discrimination against members of the majority Shi'a community. HRW found that government officials appeared to be using a "repertoire" of techniques to cause pain and elicit confessions from security suspects. These included "the use of electro-shock devices, suspension in painful positions, beating the soles of the feet (falaka), and beatings of the head, torso, and limbs", as well as threats to kill detainees or rape them or members of their families, in violation of Bahrain's obligations as a state party to the United Nations Convention Against Torture and Other Cruel, Inhuman or Degrading Treatment or Punishment (Convention Against Torture) and other international treaties and as the prohibition of torture in Bahraini law.

During opposition street protests in Shi'a neighbourhoods and villages around Manama in December 2007 a protester was allegedly asphyxiated by tear gas and confrontations, provoking further confrontations with security forces. Following an incident in the village of Jidhafs Bahraini human rights activists reported claims by detainees of severe beatings, electric shock, prolonged suspension in painful positions and other forms of abuse amounting to torture or other illegal treatment. These claims were officially denied.

Detainees arrested in March and April 2008 following clashes in and around the village of Karzakan that had resulted in the death of a National Security Agency officer in disputed circumstances also alleged torture and ill-treatment. Detainees arrested in December 2008 who were alleged by the authorities to have been trained in the use of explosives and sabotage techniques or to have been recruited by the opposition Haq Movement for Liberty and Democracy to encourage violent unrest also complained of being subjected to torture and ill-treatment. When they were brought to court medical examinations of a number of detainees found evidence of injuries consistent with the detainees' allegations.

In a letter to Bahrain's Interior Minister Shaikh Rashid bin Abdullah bin Ahmad Al Khalifa, Amnesty International called for an urgent and independent investigation into allegations that, soon after their arrest in December 2008, 13 individuals held incommunicado at the headquarters of the National Security Apparatus in Manama were tortured with electric shocks and beatings and by being suspended by the wrists for long periods. The detainees were reported to have been transferred to the "Dry Dock" Prison (the Ministry of Interior's Short-Term Detention Unit) only after they had made "confessions". Amnesty International called for any officials found responsible for torture or other serious abuses to be brought to justice.

On 11 April 2009, an informal royal "pardon" was granted to 178 detainees whose sentences or trials were suspended. HRW interviewed a number of the released detainees about their treatment in detention and under interrogation (some refused to speak to HRW — human rights and opposition activists claimed that former detainees had been warned against speaking to investigators or the media). Most claimed to have been subjected to torture and ill-treatment at the Ministry of Interior's General Directorate of Criminal Investigation (CID) headquarters in Adliya, in Manama, at the Ministry of Interior's "Dry Dock" Short-Term Detention Unit and possibly at the offices of the NSA.

The Ministry of the Interior and the National Security Agency both report to the Supreme Defense Council, headed by the prime minister and all of whose members are members of the royal family.

In a number of cases prosecutors had failed to record complaints, order medical examinations or investigate allegations, and sometimes returned detainees to the security officers allegedly responsible for the ill treatment.

The Ministry of the Interior and the Public Prosecution Office denied that torture had been used and asserted that the claims had been fabricated. Human Rights Watch found the accounts credible and the medical reports of government doctors and court documents corroborated the allegations. HRW noted that corroboration of torture and ill-treatment by government doctors marked a major improvement from the pre-1999 era of routine torture when few examinations were carried out and doctors were intimidated to prevent them corroborating abuse.

HRW wrote to the Ministry of Justice and the Ministry of the Interior asking detailed questions about government policies concerning torture and ill treatment but received no response. HRW also called on the United States, France, and the United Kingdom, countries with significant security links to Bahrain, to urge the government of Bahrain to take immediate and measurable steps to end the use of torture by its security forces. As France and the United Kingdom provide the NSA and the Ministry of Interior, respectively, with training and assistance they "risk being implicated in prohibited practices and violating their own legal obligations if they cooperate with law enforcement forces they know or should know are employing torture or other ill-treatment."

== Torture during Bahraini uprising ==
Torture during the Bahraini uprising has been described in many human rights reports as being widespread and systematic. 64% of detainees (1866 individuals) reported being tortured. At least five individuals died as a result. During the uprising, detainees were interrogated by three government agencies, the Ministry of Interior, the National Security Agency and the Bahrain Defence Force. According to the Bahrain Independent Commission of Inquiry (BICI) report, physical and psychological abuse was inflicted by the National Security Agency and the Ministry of Interior on a systematic basis and in many cases amounted to torture. The BICI report describes the systematic use of techniques similar to those used during the repression of the 1990s uprising as indicative of "a systemic problem, which can only be addressed on a systemic level."

== List of individuals killed under torture in Bahrain ==
The table below shows the names of some Bahrainis who have died under torture of regime security officers. The list has been compiled from reports documented by Amnesty International and Human Rights Watch.

Year of death	Name	Occupation
1976	Saeed Al-Uwainati	Journalist
1976	Mohammed Gholoom	Medical doctor
1980	Jamil Ali Mohsin Al-Ali	
1980	Karim Al-Habshi	
1981	Mohammed Hassan Madan	
1981	Sheikh Jamal Al-Asfoor	Cleric
1986	Radhi Mahdi Ibrahim	
1986	Dr Hashim Isma'il al-'Alawi	Pediatrician
1994	Haj Mirza Ali	
1995	Hamid Qasim	Student
1995	Nidal Habib Al-Nashabah	Student
1995	Hussain Qambar	
1995	Said Abd al-Rasul al-Eskafi	Student
1996	al-Sayyid 'Ali al-Sayyid Amin al-'Alawi	
1997	Bashir Abdallah Ahmad Fadhil	
1997	'Abd al-Zahra' Ibrahim 'Abdullah	
1997	Shaikh 'Ali Mirza al-Nakkas	Cleric
1998	Nuh Khalil Abdullah Al Nuh	
2011	Hasan Jasem Makki	
2011	Ali Isa Al-Saqer	
2011	Zakariya Rashid Hassan al-Ashiri	Journalist
2011	Kareem Fakhrawi	Businessman and Political activist
2011	Jaber Ebrahim Yousif Mohamed Alawiyat	
2011	Yousif Ahmed Muwali	

== See also ==
- Human rights in Bahrain
- Ian Henderson
- Adel Flaifel
- State Security Law of 1974
- 1990s Uprising in Bahrain
- History of Bahrain
