= Supreme Defence Council (Bahrain) =

The Supreme Defense Council (SDC) (Arabic:مجلس الدفاع الأعلى) is Bahrain's highest defense authority responsible for making highest level of decisions regarding defense and security. It consist of 14 members, all drawn from the Al Khalifa ruling family.

The council is headed by the King, who is also the Supreme Commander of Bahrain Defense Force (BDF) and includes: the Crown Prince (king's eldest son), the Prime Minister (king's uncle), the Royal Court Minister and ten senior officials from the Al Khalifa family such as the Commander-in-Chief of BDF, and the heads of certain government agencies, such as the Minister of Foreign Affairs, Minister of Interior, Minister of Defence and Director of the National Security Agency (NSA).

Meetings are usually held at Al-Sakhir Palace.

== History ==
The Supreme Defense Council was formed on 8 December 1973 and was headed by the former Prime Minister, Khalifa ibn Salman Al Khalifa, a position he held until his nephew, Hamad (the current king) succeeded his father Isa bin Salman Al Khalifa on 6 March 1999.

According to Al Bandar report issued by Salah Albandar in 2006 when he was working as a consultant for the government, the Supreme Council is the creator and supervisor of a secret plan that classifies Shia as a main threat to the royal family. The plan allegedly aims to marginalize Shia in all positions in Bahrain.

In November 2011, Khalifa bin Abdullah Al Khalifa, the king's cousin, and then the director of the country's National Security Agency (NSA), was appointed Secretary General of the Supreme Defense Council, after a governmental commission of inquiry report confirmed the use of torture by NSA which led to the death of a co-founder and board member of the independent Alwasat daily newspaper. This move was criticized by Ali Salman, the head of Al Wefaq, the main opposition party, who called it "a promotion for someone who should have been punished according to the recommendations of BICI".

== Members ==
The Council is headed by the king, who has the authority to appoint its members. The members are:

- Commander-in-chief of Bahrain Defense Force
- Deputy Commander-in-chief of Bahrain Defense Force.
- Director of the NSA.
- Ministers of:
1. Royal Court
2. Defense
3. National Guard
4. Interior
5. National Economy
6. Foreign Affairs
7. Council of Ministers Affairs
8. Information
9. Finance
