= Salman bin Ahmad Al Khalifa =

Co-ruler of Bahrain from 1795 to 1825

- Sheikh of Bahrain (joint ruler)

Joint ruler of Bahrain
- Reign: 1795 – 1825
- Predecessor: Ahmad bin Muhammad Al Khalifa
- Successor: Khalifa bin Salman
- Died: 1825 (some local accounts: c. 1821)
- Issue: Khalifa
- House: Al Khalifa
- Father: Ahmad bin Muhammad Al Khalifa

Salman bin Ahmad Al Khalifa (Arabic: سلمان بن أحمد آل خليفة; died 1825) was a Sheikh of the Al Khalifa who, together with his younger brother Abdullah, ruled Bahrain jointly after the death of their father Ahmad, the leader of the Utub conquest of the islands from the Persians in 1783. As the elder son he became the senior ruler in 1795, although in practice Abdullah, who lived on Muharraq, came to exercise the greater authority while Salman lived on the main island. Salman and Abdullah were held hostage by the Saudi forces at Diriyah around 1809–1810 and were released after Bahrain was recovered for the Al Khalifa. British records name "Salman-bin-Ahmad and 'Abdullah-bin-Ahmad" as the Shaikhs of Bahrain who in February 1820 joined the General Treaty of Peace with the British. Salman died in 1825, according to Bombay government records, though local accounts place his death about 1821. His descendants became the dominant branch of the family: his grandson Muhammad bin Khalifa displaced Abdullah in 1843, and in 1869 the British installed his great-grandson Isa bin Ali as ruler.

== Background ==
=== The conquest of Bahrain ===
Lorimer dates the modern history of Bahrain from 1783, when the Persians who held the islands were expelled by an Arab force led by the shaikhs of the Utub, with contingents from many tribes of the Arabian mainland. The Persian garrison in the fort at Manama capitulated on 28 July 1783 after a siege of about two months, and Bahrain became an Arab principality governed by shaikhs of the Al Khalifa section of the Utub.

=== Parents and siblings ===
Salman was the elder of the two adult sons of Ahmad bin Muhammad, who ruled Bahrain and Qatar for twelve years and died in the early summer of 1795 (AH 1209), leaving four sons: Salman and Abdullah, who were adults, and the minors Muhammad and Yusuf. (Lawson dates Ahmad's death to 1796.) Lorimer calls Salman the "elder brother" of Abdullah.

== Joint rule ==
=== Succession and division of authority ===
According to a doctoral thesis by a member of the ruling family, Salman, as eldest son, succeeded his father in the rulership of Bahrain and Qatar with Zubarah as his capital, assisted by Abdullah as junior co-ruler. In 1798 (AH 1212) the brothers and the Al Khalifa appear to have moved from Zubarah to Bahrain: Abdullah made the islet of Halat Bu Maher and later Muharraq his headquarters, while Salman first settled in the village of Jaou and then at Rifa'a, where he built a fort on the remains of an older one. Lawson instead records that Salman was based first at Zubarah and later at Manama. When the British Resident, Lieutenant McLeod, visited in January 1823 he found Salman retired at Rifa'a ash-Sharqi.

=== Conflict with Muscat and the Wahhabis ===
Lorimer's narrative speaks of "the Utub" and "the Shaikhs of Bahrain" collectively and rarely singles out Salman; the events below are the context in which the brothers ruled.

War with Muscat, 1799–1802

In 1799 Sayyid Sultan of Muscat declared war on the Utub of Bahrain, nominally over a due he claimed on ships passing Muscat, and captured three large Bahraini ships returning from India. In 1800 he invaded Bahrain, deported twenty-six leading families to Muscat and left a garrison in a fort at Arad on Muharraq. Some Utub chiefs took refuge at Zubarah and Kuwait. In 1801 the Utub besieged the Omani garrison in Arad and forced it to surrender and leave. When Sayyid Sultan returned in 1802 with help from Bushehr, the Utub had secured the support of the Wahhabis, and he abandoned the enterprise.

Wahhabi influence, 1803–1811

Under pressure from the Wahhabi emir the Utub were drawn into the wars of the Saudi–Wahhabi power for some years. In about 1810 the Wahhabis appointed an agent to oversee Bahrain, Hasa and Qatar; the local shaikhs kept their authority in local matters but paid tribute and Wahhabi teachers were stationed in the islands.

Captivity at Diriyah, c. 1809–1810

The thesis, drawing on Arabic chronicles and British records, gives a fuller account. Subsequently a Saudi force under Sulaiman bin Saif bin Touq approached Qatar; Salman and Abdullah chose not to confront it, and were taken hostage and sent to the Saudi imam Saud in Diriyah together with their cousin Abdullah bin Khalifa, while the other hostages were freed. Meanwhile Abdul Rahman bin Rashid Al Fadhil retook Bahrain from the Saudis in 1810, and the captives' young sons, led by Salman's son Khalifa, told a Saudi delegation that they now ruled and that their fathers were as good as dead, a ruse to persuade the Saudis that the hostages were worthless. Imam Saud then released Salman, Abdullah and Abdullah bin Khalifa on condition that, if they succeeded, they would remain his vassals; back in Bahrain, Salman and Abdullah freed the Saudi commander, Ibrahim Ibn Ufaisan, and the other Saudi captives and told them to inform Saud that they would not accept him as overlord. The sources disagree on the Saudi commander's name: the thesis and al-Nabhani give Ibrahim ibn Ufaisan, Lorimer names the Wahhabi agent in Bahrain as "Abdullah-bin-'Ufaisan", and Ibn Bishr names Fahd ibn Sulayman ibn Ufaisan as the garrison commander at the Manama fort whom the Al Khalifa sons captured with sixteen men and held as a hostage against their kin at Diriyah. Ibn Bishr also dates the arrival of Salman, his brother Abdullah and Abdullah bin Khalifa at Diriyah to AH 1225 (1810–11), and records that Saud detained the chiefs and sent the sons and subjects home. Al-Nabhani, whose chronology differs, places the loss of Bahrain to Ibn Ufaisan in AH 1224 and its recovery by Abd al-Rahman bin Rashid Al Fadil, a nephew of the Al Khalifa, in AH 1225.

The attack of 1816

In July 1816 a Muscat fleet, reinforced by ships from the Persian coast, attacked Bahrain. The invaders landed on Muharraq but were heavily defeated, losing two close relatives of Sayyid Saʿid, among them his younger brother Hamad. Local accounts reported in the thesis say that Salman had hidden a large cavalry force under his sons Khalifa and Ahmad behind the date gardens opposite Sitrah, and that Khalifa's part in the battle brought him great prominence.

=== Relations with Britain ===
Lorimer's account of the British dealings with Bahrain before 1820 concentrates on Abdullah, whom he calls "the Shaikh of the principality". In July 1816 Lieutenant Bruce, the British Resident at Bushehr, visited Bahrain and met Abdullah, who said he could hold his own against Muscat, at least with Wahhabi assistance. In 1817 Bruce reported that Bahrain, a principal market for plundered goods and a main source of supplies for the Qawasim, could hardly be regarded as other than a piratical settlement. In February 1819 a British squadron under Captain Loch visited the island to investigate a report that Indian women had been sold in its bazaar as slaves; the report was not substantiated, but Loch arranged an exchange of prisoners that freed seventeen Indian women held at Ras al-Khaimah, and persuaded the shaikh to sign an agreement against the sale of captured British property.

=== The treaties of 1820 ===
When Britain mounted its expedition against Ras al-Khaimah in 1819, its policy towards Bahrain was one of neutrality so long as the Utub refrained from piracy. In January 1820 the Al Khalifa, alarmed by the crippling of their Qasimi allies, sent an agent to Muscat and agreed to pay an annual tribute of 30,000 dollars to Sayyid Saʿid. On 17 January 1820 Loch obtained the surrender of about ten Qasimi vessels that had taken refuge in Bahrain.

A preliminary treaty of peace "binding Salman-bin-Ahmad and 'Abdullah-bin-Ahmad, Shaikhs of Bahrain" to prevent the sale of plundered goods and the supply of provisions to pirates was concluded at Sharjah on 5 February 1820 by their agent, Saiyid ʿAbdul Jalil. The shaikhs themselves signed the General Treaty of Peace in Bahrain on 23 February 1820. Lawson notes that the treaty, signed by both brothers, recognised the Al Khalifa as Bahrain's legitimate rulers.

=== Bruce's agreement and McLeod's visit ===
In 1822 the British Resident, Captain Bruce, concluded an agreement with the Persian governor of Shiraz that acknowledged Persian claims over Bahrain. The Bombay Government rejected it, stating that there was no proof of the Persian title, and removed Bruce from his post.

His successor, Lieutenant McLeod, landed at Manama on 27 January 1823 on a tour of the Arab coast and was hospitably received by the shaikhs. His chief purpose was to reassure them that Bruce's agreement was of no effect and that British policy had not changed; he also discussed a Bahraini vessel that had been seized and taken to Bombay on suspicion of piracy. McLeod found Abdullah, who lived on Muharraq with most of the Utub, in virtual charge of the state. Salman, "a very old man" who was represented in most matters by his son Khalifa, had retired to Rifa'a ash-Sharqi, where the Resident also met him. McLeod reported that the shaikhs' authority did not seem as absolute as might have been expected and was borne with reluctance by the inhabitants.

== Death and succession ==
=== Date of death ===
The Bombay government's records place Salman's death in 1825: the thesis cites a letter of the Governor in Council at Bombay dated 2 July 1825 and a report by the Resident, Lieutenant-Colonel Stannus, dated 10 March 1825, and a mid-19th-century compilation of Bombay records prints a genealogical table of the Al Khalifa showing him as "deceased 1825". Lorimer likewise states that he died in 1825, two years after McLeod's visit. Local Arabic accounts, however, place his death in AH 1236 (about 1821) and attribute it to a pandemic that swept Bahrain; the thesis follows the British sources, and so does this article. Since McLeod met Salman at Rifa'a in January 1823, a death in 1821 appears contradicted by Lorimer's own narrative.

=== Succession ===
On Salman's death his son Khalifa succeeded to a half share of the net revenue of the principality. Abdullah, although the consent of his nephew was in theory required for acts of government, kept the whole executive power in his own hands. Abdullah outlived both Salman and Khalifa and was sole ruler from 1834 to 1843.

== Family ==
Salman's eldest son and successor was Khalifa. The thesis names a second son, Ahmad, who with Khalifa served as junior co-ruler. The Bombay records also list a Muhammad bin Salman, described around the 1850s as the "uncle" of the then ruler, as Khalifa's brother. Salman's grandson Muhammad bin Khalifa became ruler of Bahrain in 1843.

== Legacy ==
Salman's line prevailed in the dynastic struggles that followed the deaths of the first generation. Lawson records that Salman's grandson Muhammad bin Khalifa ousted Abdullah in 1843, which began some twenty-five years of fighting between Salman's descendants at Manama and Abdullah's supporters, who allied with powerful tribes in Qatar and al-Hasa. In 1869 British forces ended the conflict and appointed Salman's great-grandson Isa bin Ali as ruler. The Bombay records show that the family of Salman's grandson Muhammad was known as "Al Sulman", to distinguish it from the rival "Al Abdoolla" branch.

== See also ==
- House of Khalifa
- Abdullah bin Ahmad Al Khalifa
- Khalifa bin Salman Al Khalifa (joint ruler)
- General Maritime Treaty of 1820
