= Khalifa bin Salman Al Khalifa (joint ruler) =

Joint ruler of Bahrain from 1825 to 1834

- Sheikh of Bahrain (joint ruler)

Joint ruler of Bahrain
- Reign: 1825 – 31 May 1834
- Predecessor: Salman bin Ahmad Al Khalifa
- Died: 31 May 1834
- Issue: Muhammad; Ali
- House: Al Khalifa
- Father: Salman bin Ahmad Al Khalifa

Khalifa bin Salman Al Khalifa (Arabic: خليفة بن سلمان آل خليفة; died 31 May 1834) was a Sheikh of the Al Khalifa who shared the rule of Bahrain with his uncle Abdullah from 1825 until his death. The son of Salman, he first appears in British records in 1823 as the representative of his aged father, and on Salman's death in 1825 he inherited a half share of the principality's net revenue, although Abdullah kept the executive power in his own hands. Lorimer's Gazetteer describes him as the "junior Shaikh of Bahrain" and records him commanding the defenders on the shore of Manama bay during the Omani invasion of 1828. Described in a doctoral thesis as Abdullah's nephew and "junior co-ruler", he had earlier helped his father's cause in the Saudi captivity crisis of 1810 and in the battle against the Omanis in 1816, and he died after a quarrel with some of Abdullah's sons. His sons Muhammad and Ali both later ruled Bahrain, and the line of rulers installed by the British in 1869 descends from him.

== Background ==
Khalifa was the son of Salman bin Ahmad, the elder of the two sons of Ahmad who shared the chiefship of Bahrain after the Utub conquest of the islands from the Persians in 1783. Salman and his brother Abdullah divided the practical business of government: Abdullah, who lived on Muharraq among most of the Utub, held the greater authority, while Salman, who lived on the main island, grew old and delegated. When the British Political Resident, Lieutenant McLeod, visited Bahrain in January 1823, he found Salman "a very old man" who was represented in most matters by his son Khalifa and had retired to Rifa'a ash-Sharqi.

=== Early role ===
In about 1809–1810 Salman and Abdullah were taken hostage by Saudi forces and sent to Diriyah. According to the thesis, the hostages' young sons, led by Khalifa bin Salman, then told a Saudi delegation that the captive shaikhs were as good as dead for them and that the sons were now the rulers, a ruse that helped persuade the Saudis to release the elder shaikhs. In the battle of 1816 against Sayyid Said of Muscat and Rahma bin Jabir, local accounts say Salman placed a hidden cavalry force under his sons Khalifa and Ahmad; Khalifa's part in the fighting gave him great prominence among the Bahrainis and the Utub.

== Joint rule ==
=== Succession (1825) ===
Lorimer places Salman's death in 1825, when Khalifa succeeded to a half share of the net revenue of the principality. Abdullah, although the consent of his nephew was in theory required for acts of government, retained the whole executive power. The succession was not entirely peaceful in diplomatic terms: Sayyid Said of Muscat took up the claim of Salman's sons to supreme power against their uncle Abdullah, and the Governor of Bombay felt obliged to address a strong personal remonstrance to him.

=== The Omani invasion of 1828 ===
In 1828 Said bin Sultan, the ruler of Muscat, led a large fleet against Bahrain for the third and last time, joined at Abu Dhabi by Sheikh Tahnun and a contingent of the Bani Yas. Abdullah organised the defence: the larger Bahraini ships were massed in Khor Fasht, the entrance to Khor al-Qalai'ah was blocked with sunken boats filled with stones, fortifications were repaired and many Arabs were recruited.

When the Omani fleet anchored off Sitrah on 31 October 1828, the shore opposite its anchorage was at first watched by a force under Khalifa bin Salman, "the junior Shaikh of Bahrain". After three days, while the Omanis were removing the obstructions at the mouth of Khor al-Qalai'ah, the defenders fell back on Hurah, an eastern suburb of Manama. The thesis presents this retreat as a planned tactic: Khalifa drew the Omanis towards the date groves, then signalled hidden cavalry to attack. On 9 November the Bahraini troops covering Manama attacked the Omani and Bani Yas force that had landed, and a cavalry charge from the date groves threw it into disorder; Said himself had to be carried off the field and the invasion force lost an estimated 500 men. Said sailed home on 21 November.

=== Later years ===
After the failure of the Omani attack the shaikhs of Bahrain fought a naval war with Muscat in 1829, a campaign Lorimer describes as led personally by Abdullah. In 1830–31 the Wahhabi amir Turki bin Abdullah demanded that the shaikhs acknowledge his supremacy and pay zakat, and Bahrain sent a "near relation" to negotiate at Riyadh; in 1833 Abdullah repudiated that allegiance and in 1834 blockaded the Wahhabi ports of Qatif and Uqair. Lorimer's narrative of these years attributes decisions to Abdullah and does not describe any independent initiative by Khalifa.

== Death ==
Khalifa died on 31 May 1834. According to the thesis, after the war with the Wahhabis over Qatif and Tarut he had an intense dispute with some of Abdullah's sons over the division of war booty, which upset him so much that he developed a severe fever and died; it adds that Lt A. B. Kemball blamed the "vicious and oppressive conduct" of one of Abdullah's sons. The date is confirmed in the Bombay Government's chronological table. Lorimer, who calls him Abdullah's "nephew and colleague", states that Abdullah soon afterwards became sole ruler of Bahrain. Lawson likewise records that Abdullah outlived both Salman and Khalifa and ruled alone from 1834 to 1843. Lorimer notes that, left to himself, Abdullah proved headstrong and indulgent towards his sons and relations, and that the internal affairs of the shaikhdom soon took on a serious aspect.

== Family and descendants ==
The Bombay Government's genealogical table of the Al Khalifa lists among Khalifa's sons Muhammad (later the ruler, whose mother was a sister of Mubarak bin Khalifa), Ali (whose mother was a sister of Isa bin Tarif), Ibrahim and Duaij, the last of whom was killed in the early part of the struggle for supremacy. The thesis names Muhammad as his eldest son and successor. Around the 1850s the same records describe Muhammad as the Chief of Bahrain and Ali as his brother, who "exercises a considerable share of the government"; the clan of Salman's descendants was called "Al Sulman" to distinguish it from the rival "Al Abdoolla" branch.

Khalifa's sons Muhammad and Ali were the principal figures of the next generation. In about 1840, when the Egyptians left Hasa, some of its inhabitants asked "Muhammad-bin-Khalifah-bin-Salman", the grand-nephew of Abdullah, to take over the government of Hasa; Abdullah's objections led to a violent quarrel, after which Muhammad left Bahrain for Qatar and set up an opposition to his grand-uncle. In 1843 Muhammad ousted Abdullah, beginning some twenty-five years of conflict between Salman's descendants and Abdullah's supporters; he remained ruler until he fled in September 1868.

When Muhammad fled to Qatar in September 1868 after British naval action, his brother Ali bin Khalifa, who had been associated with him in the administration, signed an agreement with the British Resident on 6 September 1868 and became sole ruler; Lorimer calls his rule "short and tragic", lasting less than a year. After Ali was killed in the invasion of 1869, the British installed Isa bin Ali, who came over from Qatar and was installed as ruler without interference. Lawson identifies Isa as a great-grandson of Salman, which makes him a grandson of Khalifa.

== Legacy ==
Khalifa never held undivided power, but his line prevailed: his sons Muhammad and Ali ruled in turn, and when the British ended the civil war in 1869 they installed his grandson Isa bin Ali, whose descendants rule Bahrain.

== See also ==
- House of Khalifa
- Salman bin Ahmad Al Khalifa
- Abdullah bin Ahmad Al Khalifa
- Muhammad bin Khalifa Al Khalifa
