= National Security Agency (Bahrain) =

Bahrain governmental agency

Bahrain Intelligence Agency (BIA1)
- جهاز الأمن الوطني

Agency overview
- Formed: 8 May 2002
- Preceding agency: General Directorate for State Security Investigations
- Jurisdiction: Government of Bahrain
- Headquarters: Diwan Fort, Manama; 26°13′22.47″N 50°34′33.8″E
- Agency executive: Talal bin Mohammed Al Khalifa, President of NSA

The National Security Agency (NSA) or Bahrain Intelligence Agency (BIA1) (Arabic: جهاز الأمن الوطني) is an investigative authority, and secret police agency, in Bahrain that is associated with but not formally part of the Ministry of the Interior. The NSA was formed after King Hamad issued Decree No. 14 of 2002 declaring it as the replacement of the General Directorate for State Security Investigations. The NSA was granted the power to make arrests by a 2008 royal decree, and lost this power in 2011, again by royal decree.

== History ==
Before 2002, the NSA was organized as the 'General Directorate for State Security Investigations' (Arabic: الإدارة العامة لمباحث أمن الدولة), also known as 'Security and Intelligence Service'. It was headed by Ian Henderson from 1966 to 1998. After Henderson retired in 1998, the position was taken by Khalid bin Mohammed Al Khalifa, a nephew of the then-ruler Isa bin Salman Al Khalifa.

Adel Flaifel served in the organization until 2002.

== Directors ==
The NSA director is appointed by the King, has cabinet rank, and is a member of the Supreme Defence Council along with the Minister of Interior. According to the BCHR and opposition, senior positions of the NSA are occupied by relatives of the King, the majority of the agency's employees are non-Bahraini citizens and, despite being a majority of Bahrain's population, Shi'ites make up only 4% of the NSA's employees.

The current president of the NSA is Talal bin Mohammed bin Khalifa Al Khalifa, who was appointed on 4 August 2016. Talal bin Mohammed is the son of Mohammed bin Khalifa Al Khalifa who served as the Interior Minister of Bahrain for 31 years (1973–2004), and is the grandson of Khalifa bin Hamad Al Khalifa, the former Director General of Police & Public Security (1937–1961). Talal's great grandfather was the ruler of Bahrain Hamad ibn Isa Al Khalifa (1872–1942). Talal is the brother of Fawaz bin Mohammed Al Khalifa, the current ambassador of Bahrain to the United Kingdom.

Prior to Talal bin Mohammed's appointment, the director of the NSA was Major-General Adel bin Khalifa bin Hamad Al Fadhel. Adel bin Khalifa was appointed on 28 November 2011 to fill a vacancy created when the former director, Khalifa bin Abdullah Al Khalifa, was promoted to the position of Secretary General of the Supreme Defense Council. Khalifa bin Abdullah is a cousin of King Hamad and a member of the Al Khalifa royal family of Bahrain. Khalifa bin Abdullah was appointed on 23 March 2008, prior to which he was serving as Bahrain's ambassador to London. He was previously the acting CEO of Bahrain Radio and Television Corporation and director of Press and Foreign Media Relations.

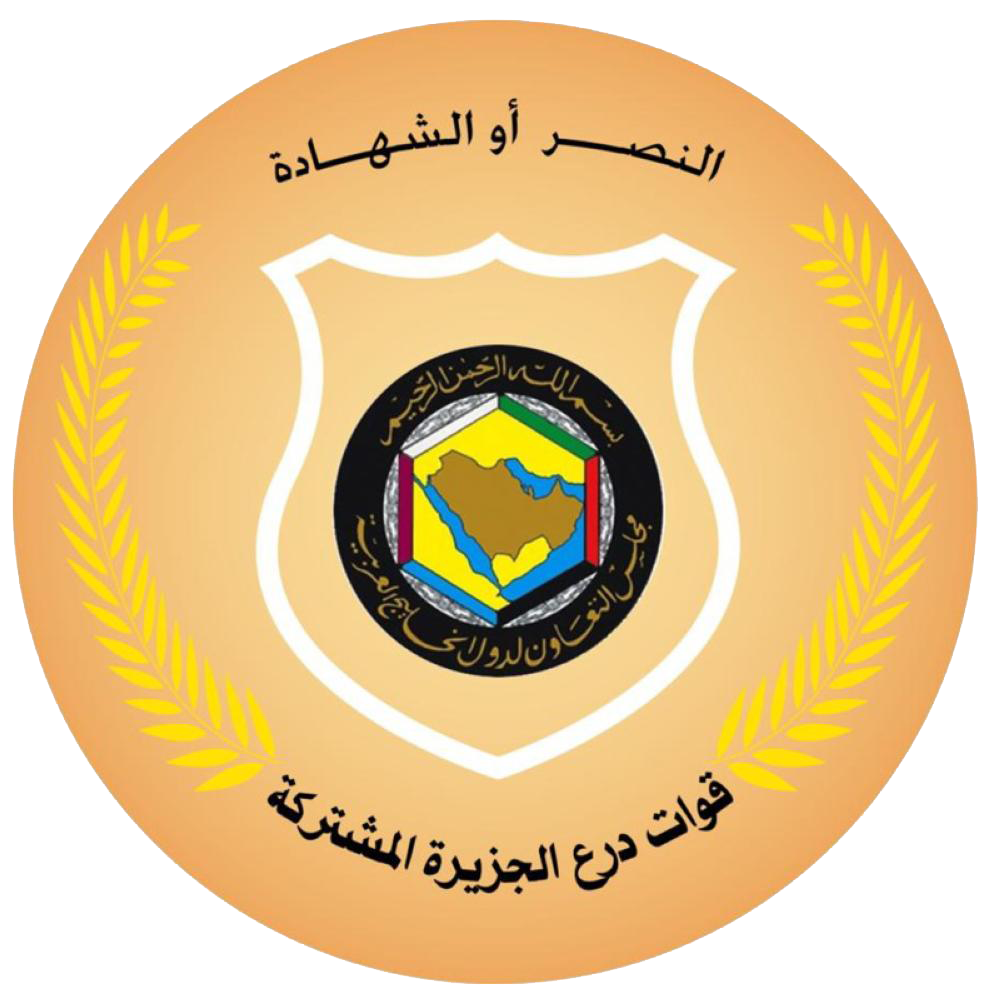

Prior to Khalifa bin Abdullah, the position of NSA director was occupied by another cousin of the King, Khalifa bin Ali bin Rashid Al Khalifa, who was appointed in September 2005, and is the current ambassador to London. The first director of the NSA was another cousin of the King, Abdul Aziz bin Atiyatallah Al Khalifa, who was appointed by the King in May 2002.

== Post- Arab Spring and Aftermath ==
After the attempted overthrow of the Bahraini Government and assistance from neighbouring GCC states to support the Bahraini Government (Peninsula Shield Force) during the Arab Spring, the NSA's role in defending the country from foreign perils become more imperative as Iranian efforts to export its revolution to Bahrain intensified since the establishment of the Islamic Republic of Iran and the toppling of the Shah, as Iran considered Bahrain as a part of Iranian Soveringty. Despite this, the NSA remains consistent in swaying Iranian attempts to incite serious violence in the country. Attempts of this includes a series of supporting its proxy groups in Bahrain as well as attempts to smuggle weaponry inside Bahrain, these litany of terrorist attacks extend as late as 2018, when Bahraini Officer Hisham Alhammadi was murdered in a blaze of gunfire and the affiliates were arrested at sea, Al-Ashtar Brigades claimed responsibility, precedently, in the Karranah Blast which killed a Police officer and injuring 7 others after a home made bomb was detonated in Karranah Village and the culprits were also arrested.

Furthermore, it has been speculated that after the Abraham Accords, Bahrain and Israel enhanced relations in many fields, including intelligence agencies, signing a security cooperation agreement and training Mossad agents in the Kingdom for both countries to receive mutual benefits on behalf of security.

During the 2026 Iran war, an NSA officer was sentenced to life imprisonment in June over the death of a detainee arrested for expressing support for Iran.

=== Bahrain NSA chiefs ===
#	Name	Picture	Took office	Left office
1	Ian Henderson		1966	1 February 1998
2	Khalid bin Mohammed Al Khalifa		1 February 1998	8 May 2002
3	Abdul Aziz bin Ateyatallah Al Khalifa		8 May 2002	26 September 2005
4	Khalifa bin Ali bin Rashid Al Khalifa		26 September 2005	23 March 2008
5	Khalifa bin Abdullah Al Khalifa		23 March 2008	28 November 2011
6	Adel bin Khalifa bin Hamad Al-Fadhel		28 November 2011	4 August 2016
7	Talal bin Mohammed Al Khalifa		4 August 2016	12 September 2017
8	Adel bin Khalifa bin Hamad Al-Fadhel		13 September 2017	Current
