= List of current monarchs of the Arabian Peninsula =

Arabian Peninsula states

This is a list of current monarchs of the Arabian Peninsula.

It includes the reigning houses of those states which are monarchies: Bahrain, Kuwait, Oman, Qatar, Saudi Arabia and each of the seven emirates which make up the United Arab Emirates.

The ruling families and their current head (and therefore ruler) are:

Monarchy	Title	Monarch	House	Notes
Bahrain	King	Hamad bin Isa Al Khalifa	Al Khalifa	
Kuwait	Emir	Mishal Al Sabah	Al Sabah	
Oman	Sultan	Haitham bin Tariq Al Said	Al Said	
Qatar	Emir	Tamim bin Hamad Al Thani	Al Thani	
Saudi Arabia	King	Salman bin Abdulaziz Al Saud	Al Saud	
United Arab Emirates
Abu Dhabi	Sheikh	Mohamed bin Zayed Al Nahyan	Al Nahyan	
Dubai	Sheikh	Mohammed bin Rashid Al Maktoum	Al Maktoum	
Ajman	Sheikh	Humaid bin Rashid Al Nuaimi III	Al Nuaimi	
Sharjah	Sheikh	Sultan bin Muhammad Al Qasimi	Al Qasimi	
Ras Al Khaimah	Sheikh	Saud bin Saqr Al Qasimi	Al Qasimi	
Umm Al Quwain	Sheikh	Saud bin Rashid Al Mualla	Al Mualla	
Fujairah	Sheikh	Hamad bin Mohammed Al Sharqi	Al Sharqi	

== See also ==
- List of Arabian Houses – royal families on the Arabian Peninsula in the 20th century
- Royal families of the United Arab Emirates
