= Public Security Forces =

Public Security Forces قوات الأمن العام Quwwāt al-ʾamn al-ʿām

Agency overview
- Formed: 1971
- Preceding agency: Bahrain Police

Jurisdictional structure
- Operations jurisdiction: Bahrain
- Constituting instrument: Decree Law No. 3 of the Year 1982 on the System of the Public Security Forces

Operational structure
- Headquarters: Diwan Fort, Manama
- 26°13′22.47″N 50°34′33.8″E
- Elected officer responsible: Rashid bin Abdullah Al Khalifa, Minister of Interior
- Agency executive: Tariq Al Hasan, Chief of Public Security

Website
- www.policemc.gov.bh/en/

The Public Security Forces (PSF; Arabic: قوات الأمن العام, romanized: Quwwāt al-ʾamn al-ʿām), formerly known as the Bahrain State Police, are the principal law enforcement arm of the Bahraini Ministry of Interior. They are commanded by Maj. Gen. Tarek Al Hasan and include all Ministry of Interior field units responsible for maintaining order and security in Bahrain.

== History ==
The Bahrain Police Directorate was first established in 1961 to address internal security, and was headed by Shaikh Mohammed ibn Salman Al Khalifa. At the time of Bahrain's independence from Britain in 1971, the Directorate was renamed to the Ministry of Interior, and the State Police were renamed as Public Security Forces.

== Departments ==
The following units and departments are among those that report directly to the PSF command:

- The police departments of four of the governorates of Bahrain (Manama, Muharraq, Shamaliyah and Junubiyah).
- The Special Forces Department.
- The Special Protections Department.
- The Counter Terrorism Centre.
- The General Directorate of Guards.
- The Traffic Police.
- The Operations Department.
- The Coast Guard.

== Role during 2011–present uprising ==
Members of the PSF were the law enforcement officers most often involved in crowd control, and thus in direct clashes with protesters, during the Bahraini uprising. According to a Bahrain Independent Commission of Inquiry (BICI) report issued in November 2011, they were equipped with "body armour, shields, batons, sound bombs, tear gas and shotguns." They undertook all operations to clear protesters from the Pearl Roundabout, including one that took place on Bloody Thursday which led to the death of four protesters. The PSF also carried out arrests, patrol missions and searches.

=== Human rights violations ===
According to the BICI report, PSF units involved in the Bahraini uprising used excessive force when dealing with protesters which led to many injuries, including loss of vision. The report stated:

An examination of the evidence presented to the Commission has revealed that PSF units involved in the events of February/March 2011 and subsequent events in many situations violated the principles of necessity and proportionality, which are the generally applicable legal principles in matters relating to the use of force by law enforcement officials. This is evident in both the choice of weapons that were used by these forces during confrontations with civilians and the manner in which these weapons were used. ... [T]he Commission concludes that while it has not found evidence establishing a purposeful practice of the use of lethal force by PSF units during the performance of their duties, the PSF have, on many occasions, used force and firearms in situations where this was unnecessary and in a manner that was disproportionate.

However, as of May 2011, the Government of Bahrain has not taken any action against those who used excessive force against the protesters.

In March 2021, Human Rights Watch and Bahrain Institute for Rights and Democracy claimed that the Bahraini security forces unnecessarily detained children aged between 11 and 17 over protest-related cases. The police threatened a 13-year-old with rape and electric shocks from a car battery. The police was also accused of beating children and terrorizing them into forced confessions, while barring their parents and lawyers from being present during the interrogations. There was also a video of police vehicles attempting to run down people.

== Chiefs of Public Security of Bahrain ==
| # | Name | Took office | Left office |
|---|---|---|---|
| 1 | Tariq Mubarak bin Dayna | - | 2011 |
| 2 | Tariq Hasan Al Hasan | 2011 | - |

== Helicopters ==
The Public Security Forces originally operated a pair of Westland Scouts as well as a pair of Hughes 269C helicopters. Later deliveries included a pair of Sikorsky S-76 helicopters as well as a McCulloch J-2 autogyro and an unknown number of Hughes 500D scout helicopters. Three Bell 412 utility transport helicopters now form the main lift of the force, and a single Bell 427 was acquired in 2001.

== Uniforms ==
The uniforms are Navy blue but in the past they were khaki/brown.
