= Driving license in Bahrain =

The driving license in Bahrain is a legal document that authorizes its holder to operate motor vehicles on public roads within the Kingdom of Bahrain. It is issued by the General Directorate of Traffic under the Ministry of Interior. The process of obtaining a driving license in Bahrain involves meeting the specific age requirement and passing a practical driving test.

== Eligibility and Requirements ==
To apply for a driving license in Bahrain, applicants must meet several requirements:

1. Age: Applicants must be at least 18 years old to apply for a private car license.
2. Vision Test: All applicants must undergo and pass a vision test to ensure they meet the minimum visual acuity required for driving.
3. Lessons: All applicants must complete 22 hours of driving lessons with an authorized driving instructor.
4. Practical Test: Applicants must complete a practical driving test, which includes demonstrating driving skills on a closed course and on public roads.

== Conversion of Foreign Licenses ==
Bahrain allows the conversion of foreign driving licenses from certain countries without requiring a driving test.
