= Hessa bint Salman Al Khalifa =

Bahraini consort (1933–2009)

- Born: c. 1933
- Died: 5 August 2009 (aged 75–76)
- Burial: 6 August 2009; Al Rifa'a Cemetery
- Spouse: Isa bin Salman Al Khalifa (m. 1949; died 1999)
- Issue: King Hamad bin Isa Al Khalifa; Rashid bin Isa Al Khalifa; Mohamed bin Isa Al Khalifa; Ali bin Isa Al Khalifa; Shaikha bint Isa Al Khalifa; Mariam bint Isa Al Khalifa; Abdulla bin Isa Al Khalifa; Mounira bint Isa Al Khalifa; Noura bint Isa Al Khalifa
- House: Khalifa
- Father: Salman bin Ebrahim Al Khalifa
- Mother: Muneera Al Noami
- Religion: Islam

Hessa bint Salman Al Khalifa (Arabic: حصة بنت سلمان آل خليفة; c. 1933 – 5 August 2009) was a member of the Bahraini royal family, and the mother of the current monarch of Bahrain Hamad bin Isa Al Khalifa.

== Marriage and children ==
Hessa bint Salman was the consort and widow of the former Emir of Bahrain, Isa bin Salman Al Khalifa, who reigned from 1961 until his death in 1999. They married on 8 May 1949. She was the mother of the current King of Bahrain, Hamad bin Isa Al Khalifa, the couple's eldest son.

== Activities ==
Hessa bint Salman was active in charitable causes during her life. The Gulf Daily News, a Bahraini newspaper, referred to her as a "pioneer" in the promotion of humanitarian causes within Bahrain and abroad. Some of Hessa bint Salman Al Khalifa's most noteworthy projects included the care of orphans, aid to women who were divorced or widowed, and the construction of new mosques in Bahrain.

== Death and funeral ==
Hessa bint Salman Al Khalifa died on 4 August 2009 at the Al-Sakhir Palace in Bahrain. Her funeral was held on 6 August 2009 at the Isa bin Salman Grand Mosque in Riffa, Bahrain. Her funeral was attended by a number of dignitaries including her son, Hamad ibn Isa Al Khalifah, Khalifah ibn Salman Al Khalifah, Salman bin Hamad bin Isa Al Khalifa and other male members of the Al Khalifa family. Other officials, diplomats, parliamentarians and government ministers were also present.

== Legacy ==
Hamad ibn Isa Al Khalifah announced that a new charity was to be established in his mother's name, to promote causes championed by her within Bahrain.

== Patronages ==
- Honorary President of the Children & Mothers Welfare Society.
- Honorary President of the International Ladies Association.
