= King of Bahrain =

Head of state

King of the Kingdom of Bahrain
- ملك مملكة البحرين; Malik Mamlakat al-Baḥrayn
- Royal Standard of Bahrain

Incumbent
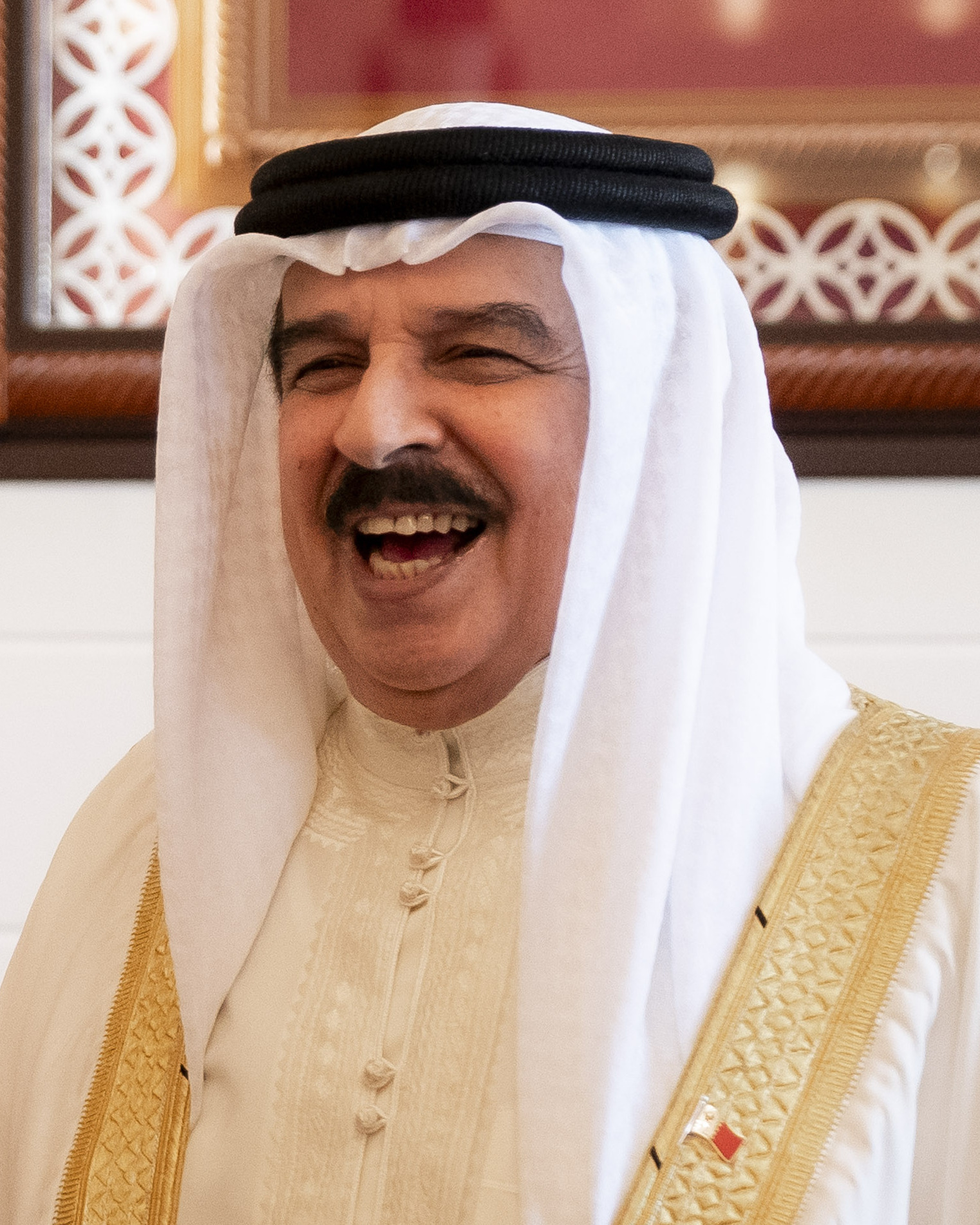
- Hamad bin Isa Al Khalifa since 6 March 1999 as Emir since 14 February 2002 as King

Details
- Style: His Majesty
- Heir apparent: Salman bin Hamad Al Khalifa
- First monarch: Ahmed bin Muhammad bin Khalifa (Hakim); Hamad bin Isa Al Khalifah (King)
- Formed: 1783 (Hakimmiyah); 16 August 1971 (Emirate); 14 February 2002 (Kingdom)
- Residence: Riffa Palace

The King of the Kingdom of Bahrain (Arabic: ملك مملكة البحرين Malik Mamlakat al-Baḥrayn) is the monarch and head of state of the Kingdom of Bahrain. The House of Khalifa has been the ruling family of the country since the 1783 Arab invasion that led to the end of Persian rule in Bahrain. Between 1783 and 1971, the Bahraini monarch held the title of hakim, and, from 1971 until 2002, the title of emir. On 14 February 2002, the emir of Bahrain, Hamad bin Isa Al Khalifa, declared Bahrain a kingdom and proclaimed himself the first king. The king enjoys wide-ranging powers, which include appointing the prime minister and the cabinet, holding supreme command over the Defence Force, chairing the Higher Judicial Council, appointing the parliament's upper house and dissolving its elected lower house.

== List of rulers ==
=== Hakims of Bahrain (1783–1971) ===
The Arabic title of the Hakim, as transliterated, was Hakim al-Bahrayn (English: Caretaker/Ruler of Bahrain). The Hakim also held the honorific title of sheikh.

Portrait	Name (Birth–Death)	Reign	Notes
	Sheikh; Ahmed bin Muhammad bin Khalifa	1783 – 18 July 1795	Leader of the 1783 Arab invasion
	Sheikh; Salman bin Ahmad Al Khalifa	1795–1825	As co-regent
	Sheikh; Abdullah bin Ahmad Al Khalifa	1795–1843	As co-regent
	Sheikh; Khalifa bin Sulman Al Khalifa	1825–1834	As co-regent with Abdullah bin Ahmad Al Khalifa
	Sheikh; Muhammad bin Khalifa Al Khalifa	1834–1842	First reign as co-regent with Abdullah bin Ahmad Al Khalifa
	Sheikh; Muhammad bin Khalifa Al Khalifa	1843–1868	Second reign
	Sheikh; Ali bin Khalifa Al Khalifa	1868–1869	
	Sheikh; Muhammad bin Khalifa Al Khalifa	1869	Third reign
	Sheikh; Muhammad bin Abdullah Al Khalifa	September – 1 December 1869	Deposed and exiled to India. Confined at Asirgarh Fort, but later removed to Chunar Fort, near Benares, where he died in 1877.
	Sheikh; Isa bin Ali Al Khalifa (1848–1932)	1 December 1869 – 26 May 1923	Abdicated
	Sheikh; Hamad bin Isa Al Khalifa (1872–1942)	27 May 1923 – 20 February 1942	
	Sheikh; Salman bin Hamad Al Khalifa (1894–1961)	20 February 1942 – 2 November 1961	
	Sheikh; Isa bin Salman Al Khalifa (1931–1999)	2 November 1961 – 16 August 1971	

=== Emirs of Bahrain (1971–2002) ===
The Arabic title of the Emir, as transliterated, was Amir dawlat al-Bahrayn (English: Chief of the State of Bahrain). The Emir also held the honorific title of sheikh.

Name	Lifespan	Reign start	Reign end	Notes	Family	Image
Sheikh; Isa bin Salman Al Khalifa: عيسى بن سلمان آل خليفة	3 June 1931 – 6 March 1999 (aged 67)	16 August 1971	6 March 1999	Son of Salman bin Hamad Al Khalifa and Mouza bint Hamad Al Khalifa	Khalifa	Isa bin Salman Al Khalifa of Bahrain
Sheikh; Hamad bin Isa Al Khalifa: حمد بن عيسى آل خليفة	28 January 1950 (age 76)	6 March 1999	14 February 2002 (title changed)	Son of Isa bin Salman Al Khalifa and Hessa bint Salman Al Khalifa	Khalifa	Hamad bin Isa Al Khalifa of Bahrain

=== King of Bahrain (2002–present) ===
The Arabic title of the King, as transliterated, is Malik al-Bahrayn (English: King of Bahrain). The King also holds the honorific title of sheikh.

Name	Lifespan	Reign start	Reign end	Notes	Family	Image
King; Hamad bin Isa Al Khalifa: حمد بن عيسى آل خليفة	28 January 1950 (age 76)	14 February 2002	Incumbent	Son of Isa bin Salman Al Khalifa and Hessa bint Salman Al Khalifa	Khalifa	Hamad bin Isa Al Khalifa of Bahrain

== See also ==
- House of Khalifa
- Succession to the Bahraini throne
- Prime Minister of Bahrain
