= Dheya bint Ebrahim Al Khalifa =

Bahraini royal

Sheikha Dheya bint Ebrahim Al Khalifa

Sheikha Dheya bint Ebrahim Al Khalifa Her Highness is a Member of the Royal Family of the Kingdom of Bahrain.

She is the President of the Riyada Group of Companies which includes, Riyada Investment (President), Riyada Development (President) and Sun Capital Investment where she currently resides as a member of the Board. She is the founder and partner of more than twenty joint ventures across the MENA region and Europe.

Styles of Sheikha Dheya
- Reference style: Her Highness
- Spoken style: Your Highness
- Alternative style: Sheikha
