= Ahmed bin Muhammad bin Khalifa =

Ruler of Bahrain from 1783 to 1795

Hakim of Bahrain
- Reign: 1783–1795
- Successor: Abdullah bin Ahmad Al Khalifa
- Born: Kuwait
- Died: 18 July 1795; Bahrain
- Burial: Diwan Castle, Bahrain
- House: Khalifa
- Father: Muhammad bin Khalifa bin Muhammad Al Khalifa
- Mother: A daughter of ‘Amr ibn Sunan Al Binali

Ahmed bin Muhammad bin Khalifa (Arabic: أحمد بن محمد بن خليفة) was the progenitor of the ruling Khalifa family of Bahrain and the first monarch or hakim of Bahrain. All of the Al Khalifa monarchs of Bahrain are his descendants. He is commonly referred to as Ahmed al-Fateh (Ahmed the Conqueror) for conquering Bahrain.

== Early life ==
Ahmed ibn Muhammed ibn Khalifa was born in Kuwait in the first half of the 18th century.

=== Siege of Zubarah 1783 ===
When Nasr Al-Madhkur – whom the Zands had appointed as Bahrain's governor – besieged Zubarah in 1783, he was defeated and driven away by an army under the command of Ahmed ibn Muhammad ibn Khalifa, who continued his victories and conquered Bahrain in 1783.

== Reign ==
Sheikh Ahmed, through his successful conquest of Bahrain in 1783, restored Bahrain's Arab independence and sovereignty. He was based in Al Zubarah on the Qatari Peninsula, an enclave and city state his father built after his departure from Kuwait. Sheikh Ahmed appointed a keeper, Ajaj, whose descendants still live in Bahrain, to Bahrain's Al Diwan Fort. He appointed a relation, Ali bin Faris to govern Bahrain on his behalf. As for his former opponent, Nasir ibn Madhkur, who had blockaded Al Zubarah the previous year, he allowed him to sail back to Bushire in Persia without any harm.

Sheikh Ahmed used to spend the winter in Zubarah, but the spring and summer seasons in Bahrain. The famous hunting ground where Sheikh Ahmed used to hunt was named "Jari Al Sheikh Ahmed", in his honor. Though the former hunting ground is currently an affluent and popular residential neighborhood in Bahrain's Southern Governorate, it still carries Sheikh Ahmed's name.

Sheikh Ahmed had proposed while in Qatar to build a canal to separate the Qatari peninsula from the mainland of the Arabian Peninsula in an attempt to prevent Wahhabi control of Bahrain and Qatar. At the time, the Wahhabi movement was slowly gaining momentum in Nejd or Central Arabia and Sheikh Ahmed was vigilant to protect his territories from foreign control.

== Death and burial ==
Sheikh Ahmed died during the summer of 1795, reportedly after a severe heart attack he had after finishing his afternoon meal which he had consumed after the afternoon prayers. He was buried in Manama next to a well known grave of a pious religious scholar.

== Children ==
He had five children: Abdullah, Salman, Mohamed and Yousif. His only known daughter, Amna bint Ahmed, was married to Rashid Al Fadhil, a distant relation of Shaikh Ahmed. Her son, Abdulrahman Al Fadhel, later played a crucial role in Bahrain's history by regaining Bahrain after it was briefly occupied by the Wahhabis in around 1809.

Regnal titles
Preceded by to Bushehr	Hakim of Bahrain; 1783–1795	Succeeded by Abdullah bin Ahmad Al Khalifa
