= List of royal families on the Arabian Peninsula in the 20th century =

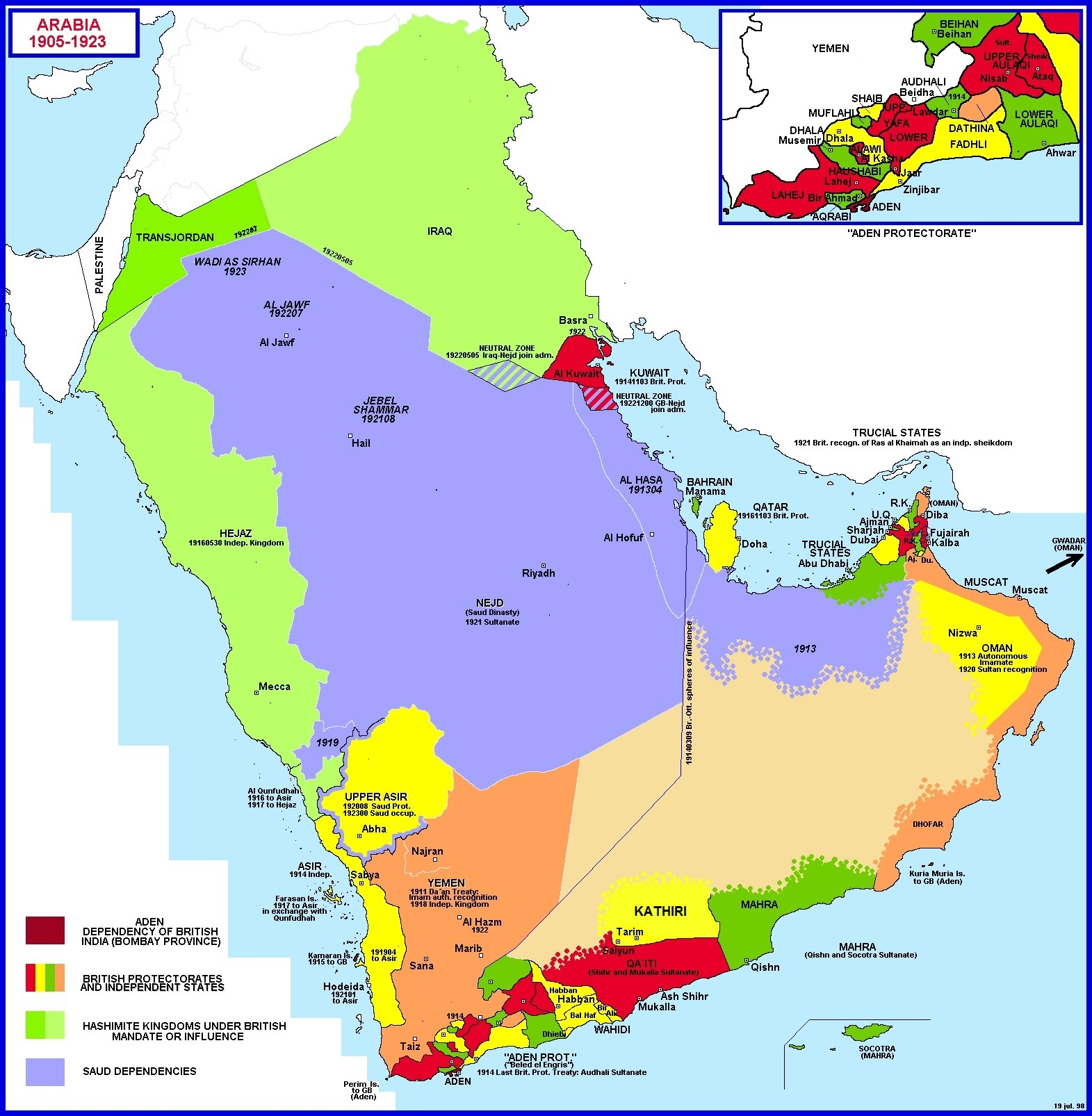
Map of the states of Arabia from 1905-1923

This is a list of royal families on the Arabian Peninsula (Note: 'The Arabian Peninsula currently includes the states of Saudi Arabia, Yemen, Oman, the United Arab Emirates, Qatar, Bahrain and Kuwait; under a strict delimitation, Jordan and Iraq are excluded from the peninsula'.) in the 20th century.

- Bahrain (independent since 1971): House of Khalifa (Al Khalifah).
- Hejaz (1916–1925): Hashemites (Al Hashim). (Note: The Hashemites would go on to reign in the Kingdom of Iraq (1932–1958), in the Emirate of Transjordan (1921–1946), and since 1946 in the current Kingdom of Jordan. Under a strict delimitation, Iraq and Jordan are excluded from the Arabian Peninsula.)
- Idrisid Emirate of Asir (1908–1934): Idrisid dynasty.
- Jabal Shammar (1836–1921): House of Rashīd (Rasheed, Rashidi): historical Arabian dynasty ruling Ḥa'il, northern Nejd.
- Kuwait (independent since 1961): House of Sabah (Al Sabah).
- Oman (independent since 1951): House of Busaid (Al Bu Said).
- Saudi Arabia (established 1932 : House of Saud (Al Saud).
- Qatar (independent since 1971): House of Thani (Al Thani), originally bedouin from Nejd.
- United Arab Emirates (independent since 1971 (Note: The seven sheikhdoms were known as the Trucial States under the British Raj's Persian Gulf Residency from 1820 to 1971. They became independent as the United Arab Emirates (UAE) in 1971.)) – royal families:

- Abu Dhabi: House of Nahyan (Al Nahyan).
- Ajman: House of Nuaimi (Al Nuaimi).
- Dubai: House of Maktoum (Al Maktoum).
- Fujairah: House of Sharqi (Al Sharqi).
- Ras Al Khaimah and Sharjah: House of Qasimi (Al Qasimi).
- Umm Al Quwain: House of Mualla (Al Mualla).

- Yemen:
  - Federation of South Arabia (1962–1967): see list. Abolished in 1967 and replaced by the People's Democratic Republic of Yemen (South Yemen; Aden).
  - Mutawakkilite Kingdom of Yemen (1918–1970): House of Rass (al-Rassi), abolished in 1970 after being defeated by the Yemen Arab Republic (North Yemen, Sanaa) in the North Yemen Civil War (1962–1970).

== See also ==
- List of current monarchs of the Arabian Peninsula
- Tribes of Arabia

== Bibliography ==
- Nyrop, Richard F. (1977). Area Handbook for the Persian Gulf States. Washington, D.C.: U.S. Government Printing Office. p. 448. "These three royal families – Al Sabah of Kuwait, Al Saud of Saudi Arabia, and Al Khalifah of Bahrain – consider themselves the most important lineages on the Arabian Peninsula."
- Riphenburg, Carol J. (1998). "Changing Gender Relations and the Development Process in Oman". In Haddad, Yvonne Yazbeck; Esposito, John L. (eds.). Islam, Gender, & Social Change. Oxford: Oxford University Press. p. 259. ISBN 9780195113570.
