= Mohamad bin Khalifa Al Khalifa =

Mohammed bin Khalifa Al Khalifa

Minister of Interior
- In office 15 December 1973 – 21 May 2004
- Monarchs: Isa bin Salman Al Khalifa; Hamad bin Isa Al Khalifa
- Preceded by: Position established
- Succeeded by: Rashid bin Abdullah Al Khalifa

Personal details
- Born: 1937 (age 88–89)

Sheikh Mohamad bin Khalifa bin Hamad Al Khalifa is a senior member of the Bahraini ruling family.

He was born in 1937. He has a degree from Royal Military Academy Sandhurst. He became a police inspector in 1959, and director of immigration and passports in 1966. He was later appointed as director in public security department. He was appointed as Minister of Interior in December 1973, and served in that position until May 2004. He was removed from that position due to violent clashes Shia protesters. Instead, he was appointed as the vice chairman of the Ruling Family Council by King Hamad bin Isa Al Khalifa.

He is a son of Khalifa bin Hamad bin Isa Al Khalifa, who was a son of Hamad bin Isa Al Khalifa (Amir of Bahrain from 1932 to 1942).
