= Rashid bin Abdullah Al Khalifa =

Prince of Bahrain

Rashid bin Abdullah Al Khalifa راشد بن عبدالله آل خليفة
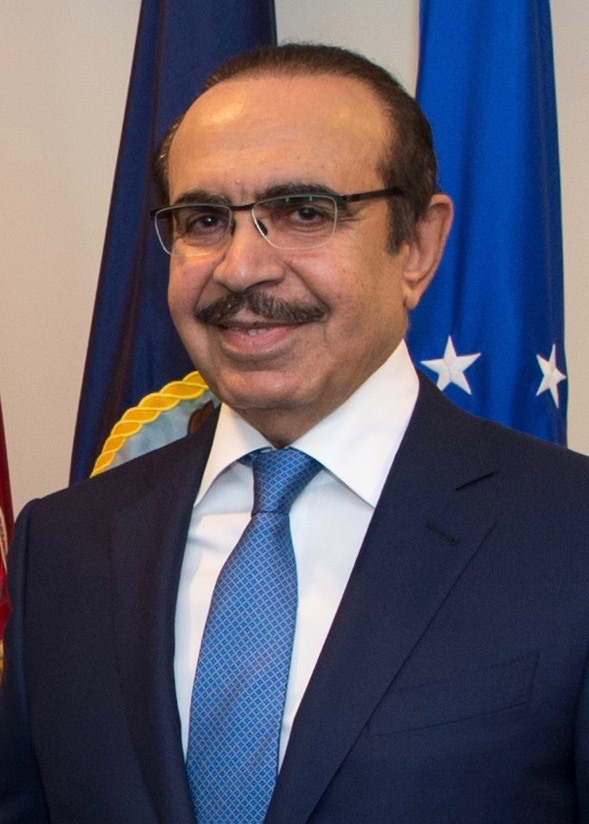

Minister of Interior
- In office: May 2004 – present
- Predecessor: Mohammed bin Khalifa bin Hamad Al Khalifa
- Monarch: King Hamad
- Born: 1954 (age 71–72); Muharraq
Names
- Rashid bin Abdullah bin Ahmed Al Khalifa
- House: House of Khalifa
- Father: Abdullah bin Ahmed Al Khalifa

Styles of Sheikh Rashid bin Abdullah Al Khalifa
- Reference style: His Excellency
- Spoken style: Your Excellency
- Alternative style: Sheikh

Rashid bin Abdullah bin Ahmed Al Khalifa (Arabic: راشد بن عبدالله بن أحمد آل خليفة; born 1954) is a member of the Bahraini royal family and since 2004 has been the minister of interior of Bahrain.

== Family ==
Rashid is the only son of Abdullah bin Ahmed Al Khalifa, son of Ahmad bin Muhammad Al Khalifa with Saeda, son of Muhammad bin Isa Al Khalifa Al Haj, son of Isa ibn Ali Al Khalifa ruler of Bahrain.

His son, Abdullah bin Rashid bin Abdullah Al Khalifa, was appointed Bahrain's ambassador to the United States in April 2017. He replaced another member of the royal family, Abdullah bin Mohammad bin Rashed Al Khalifa, who in 2013 replaced Houda Nonoo, who had served in the post since 2008.

== Career ==
Khalifa served as chief of staff of the Bahrain Defence Force from October 2001 to May 2004 with the rank of major general.

Khalifa was appointed by King Hamad as interior minister in May 2004. Khalifa replaced Mohammed bin Khalifa bin Hamad Al Khalifa in the post, who had been in office since 1974, and was dismissed following the clashes between Shia protesters and security forces in Manama. Mohammed was appointed deputy head of the ruling family council. Rashid was promoted to the rank of lieutenant general following his appointment as interior minister.
