= Abdullah bin Ahmad Al Khalifa =

Bahraini monarch (1769–1849) (r. 1821–1843)

Hakim of Bahrain
- Reign: 1821–1843
- Predecessor: Ahmad Al Khalifa
- Successor: Muhammad bin Khalifa Al Khalifa
- Born: 1769
- Died: 1849 (aged 79–80); Muscat, Muscat and Oman
- House: Khalifa
- Father: Ahmad Al Khalifa

Abdullah bin Ahmad Al Khalifa (1769–1849) was the ruler of Bahrain between 1821 and 1843. He was the fifth monarch of the Khalifa dynasty.

== Early life and reign ==
Abdullah Al Khalifa was born in 1769. He was the son of Ahmad Al Khalifa, the ruler of Bahrain.

Abdullah and his elder brother, Salman bin Ahmad Al Khalifa, began to rule the country together in 1796 when their father, Ahmad, died in Manama. In 1802 Bahrain was invaded by the ruler of Muscat. The ruler of Diriyah, Abdulaziz bin Muhammad, recaptured it and appointed a governor, Abdullah bin Ufaysan, there. Then Abdullah and Salman together with their families were sent to Diriyah where they were all detained. Due to the Ottoman attacks Abdulaziz bin Muhammad did not manage to consolidate his power in Bahrain and had to reduce his forces which allowed the Al Khalifa to reestablish their rule. His governor, Abdullah bin Ufaysan, was detained by the Al Khalifa. In 1814 Abdullah signed a treaty with the East India Company, on behalf of Britain. The agreement provided Abdullah with the opportunity to enjoy the British assistance against the threats from the Qajar rulers of Iran. In turn, Abdullah had to obey all the demands of the British. It was the first significant British interference in Bahrain.

In 1820 two more treaties were made with the British. The first one which was signed on 5 February prohibited the sale of goods seized by pirates and the supply of goods to them. In addition, the Indian prisoners were released as part of the treaty. On 23 February 1820 Abdullah and Salman signed a second treaty with the British authorities which did not entitle them to British protection from the attacks of neighbouring states, particularly of the Emirate of Najd. On the contrary, this second treaty obliged them to follow a non-aggressive policy towards the other rulers of the Gulf.

The joint rulership of Abdullah and Salman continued until 1821 when the latter died. Salman's son, Khalifa, succeeded his father as co-ruler, but Abdullah was the principal ruler. Since the treaty with the British did not provide protection Abdullah made an agreement with the ruler of the Emirate of Najd, Turki bin Abdullah Al Saud, and he recognised the supremacy of the Emirate and agreed to pay them zakat. In turn, Turki bin Abdullah provided Bahrain protection against any attack from others. Khalifa bin Salman, the co-ruler, died shortly after his accession making Abdullah the sole ruler. The agreement with the Emirate of Najd lasted until 1833.

Abdullah Al Khalifa signed a treaty with Egypt in 1839 when the Egyptian forces led by Khurshid Pasha occupied Al Hasa. The treaty demanded him to recognise the supremacy of the Egyptians and pay zakat to them which had been paid to the Emirate of Najd. Another requirement of the treaty was that a Turkish agent was to reside in Bahrain to implement the orders of Muhammad Ali Pasha, leader of the Egyptians.

In 1842 Abdullah defeated his great-nephew Muhammad bin Khalifa, son of Khalifa bin Salman, at al Nasfah battle who then requested help from Abdullah bin Thunayan Al Saud, the Emir of Najd, following his defeat and was granted asylum, but not military assistance. However, in 1843 Abdullah lost the fort of Dammam to Faisal bin Turki, successor of Abdullah bin Thunayan, as a result of disorder in his lands.

== Later years and death ==
In 1843 Abdullah was forced by the British government to abdicate due to the agreement with Egypt in 1839 and the challenges by Muhammad bin Khalifa. His removal was also a result of the intra-family struggle which caused a civil war in 1842. His successor was Muhammad bin Khalifa Al Khalifa, his grand nephew.

Abdullah Al Khalifa and his sons settled in Dammam island where one of his sons, Mubarak, was serving as the governor, and lived there for a while until the ruler of the Emirate of Najd, Faisal bin Turki, made an agreement with Muhammad bin Khalifa Al Khalifa not to assist them. Abdullah died in 1849 in Muscat, and his descendants have been living in exile since then.

== See also ==
- Battle of Al Huwaila
- Battle of Khakeekera

Regnal titles
Preceded by Ahmed bin Muhammad bin Khalifa	Hakim of Bahrain; 1796–1843	Succeeded by Muhammad bin Khalifa Al Khalifa
