= Special Security Force Command =

Paramilitary law enforcement agency in Bahrain

Special Security Forces Command
- قيادة قوة الأمن الخاصة

Agency overview
- Formed: 1930; 96 years ago
- Jurisdiction: Government of Bahrain
- Headquarters: Diwan Fort, Manama; 26°13′22.47″N 50°34′33.8″E
- Motto: Special Security Forces, Always Forward!
- Agency executive: Major General Waleed Al-Shamsi, Commander of Special Security Forces
- Parent department: Ministry of Interior
- Website: http://www.interior.gov.bh/default_en.aspx

The Special Security Force Command (SSFC; Arabic: قيادة قوة الأمن الخاصة) is a paramilitary law enforcement body in Bahrain under the command of the Ministry of the Interior. The SSFC is more commonly referred to as the "Special Security Forces", the "Special Forces", "Bahrain Special Security Forces (BSSF) or as the "riot police" (Arabic: الشغب).

== Accusations ==
The Special Security Forces have been accused of human rights abuses while trying to suppress pro-democratic activity in Bahrain. The SSFC has been at the frontline of the Bahrain government's crackdown on pro-democracy protesters during the 2011 Bahraini uprising in the Arab Spring.

In November 2007, Bahrain signed a cooperation agreement with France under which French police officers working in the Compagnies Républicaines de Sécurité have provided training to Bahrain's SSFC. A SSFC company was deployed to Afghanistan to provide base security at the United States's Camp Leatherneck.
