= Ministry of Interior (Bahrain) =

Government ministry of Bahrain

- وزارة الداخلية
- Ministry Insignia

- Ministry Flag

Agency overview
- Formed: 1971
- Preceding agency: Bahrain Police Directorate
- Jurisdiction: Government of Bahrain
- Headquarters: Diwan Fort, Manama or named as ("al-gal'aa"); 26°13′22.47″N 50°34′33.8″E
- Minister responsible: Rashid bin Abdullah Al Khalifa, Minister of Interior
- Child agency: Public Security Forces
- Website: www.interior.gov.bh

The Ministry of the Interior is responsible for law enforcement and public safety in Bahrain. The headquarters of the ministry is the Diwan Fort (also known as Manama Fort) in Manama, colloquially referred to as "al-gal'aa".

The current Interior Minister is Lieutenant General Rashid bin Abdullah Al Khalifa, who has been in office since 2004. He is a member of the Al Khalifa royal family and a cousin of King Hamad. Apart from the Bahrain Defence Force, which reports to the Minister of Defence, the public security forces and the Coast Guard report to the Minister of Interior.

== Directorates ==
- Public Security Directorate
  - Capital Governorate Police Directorate
  - Muharraq Governorate Police Directorate
  - Northern Governorate Police Directorate
  - Central Governorate Police Directorate
  - Southern Governorate Police Directorate
  - Airport Police Directorate
  - King Fahad Causeway Police Directorate
  - Criminal Investigation Directorate
- General Directorate of Civil Defence
- General Directorate of Guards (Incl. GTS - 'Guards Training School' [Security regulatory authority])
- General Directorate of Nationality, Passports, and Residency
- Coast Guard Command
- Cyber Crime Directorate
- Geographic Security Systems Directorate
- Royal Academy of Police
- General Directorate of Traffic (which serves a similar function to the Spanish counterpart with the same name, run, like the Bahraini General Directorate of Traffic, by that country's Interior Ministry)
- Customs Affairs Directorate
- Financial Intelligence Directorate
- Public Relations Directorate
  - Police Media Center

== Interior Ministers of Bahrain ==
#	Name	Took office	Left office
1	Mohammed bin Khalifa Al Khalifa	15 December 1973	21 May 2004
2	Rashid bin Abdullah Al Khalifa	21 May 2004	Present

== See also ==
- National Security Agency (Bahrain)
- Public Security Forces
- Special Security Force Command
