= House of Khalifa =

Ruling family of Bahrain

House of Khalifa آل خليفة
- Royal house

- Parent house: Ishmaelites; Qedarites tribe; Adnanites; Qays; Banu Sulaym; Anizah; Bani Utbah
- Country: Bahrain
- Founded: 1766; 260 years ago (Note: The year the family settled in Zubarah. The first ruler from the family took over in 1783.)
- Founder: Khalifa bin Mohammed
- Current head: Hamad bin Isa Al Khalifa
- Titles: King of Bahrain; Emir of Bahrain; Hakim; Sheikh; Crown Prince of Bahrain; Prime Minister of Bahrain
- Connected families: House of Sabah

The House of Khalifa (Arabic: آل خليفة, romanized: Āl Khalīfah) is the ruling family of the Kingdom of Bahrain. They follow the Maliki school of Sunni Islam and belong to the Anizah tribe. Some members of this tribe joined the Utub alliance which migrated from Najd in central Arabia to Kuwait, then ruled all of Qatar, more specifically Al Zubarah, which they built and ruled over before conquering Bahrain in 1783. The Khalifa family repressed the indigenous Baharna population in Bahrain.

The family currently heads an authoritarian regime where political and civil freedoms are substantially curtailed. The current head of the family is King Hamad bin Isa Al Khalifa, who became the Emir of Bahrain in 1999 and proclaimed himself King of Bahrain in 2002, in fact becoming a constitutional monarch.

As of 2025, roughly half of the serving cabinet ministers of Bahrain were members of the Al Khalifa royal family, while the country's Prime Minister, Salman bin Hamad Al Khalifa, is also from the Al Khalifa family and is the son of the current King.

== History ==
Bahrain fell under the control of Ahmed bin Muhammad bin Khalifa in 1783, following the defeat of Nasr Al-Madhkur who ruled the archipelago as a dependency of Persia (see Bani Utbah invasion of Bahrain). Ahmed ruled Bahrain as hakim until 1796, but was based in Zubarah (in modern-day Qatar) and spent summers in Bahrain. Ahmed was the first hakim of Bahrain and the progenitor of the ruling Al Khalifa family of Bahrain. All of the Al Khalifa rulers of Bahrain are his descendants.

Ahmed had four children. Following his death in 1796, two of his sons, Salman and Abdulla, moved to Bahrain, and co-ruled it as feudal estates and imposed taxes on the indigenous Baharnah population. Salman settled in Bahrain Island and Abdulla in Muharraq Island, each ruling independently. The Al Khalifa soon became split into two branches, Al-Abdulla and Al-Salman that engaged in open conflict between 1842 and 1846. (Note: Inter-Al Khalifa conflicts within Bahrain began in 1828 and lasted until 1869.) The Al-Salman branch was victorious and enjoyed complete rule of Bahrain.

In 1861, the Al Khalifa family entered into an agreement with Britain whereby Bahrain would become a British protectorate. In exchange, the Al Khalifa family were recognized by the British as the ruling tribe of Bahrain.

Until 1869, Bahrain was under threat of occupation by various external powers including the Wahhabis, Omanis, Ottomans, Egyptians and Persians, yet the Al Khalifa managed to keep it under their control. The Al-Abdulla branch continued to be a rival until 1895. Today, Abdulla ibn Ahmad Al Khalifa's descendants live in Qatar, while Salman ibn Ahmad Al Khalifa's descendants live in Bahrain.

== List of Al Khalifa rulers of Bahrain ==
Since 1783, the Al Khalifa have been rulers of Bahrain.

=== Hakims of Bahrain (1783–1971) ===
The Arabic title of the Hakim, as transliterated, was Hakim al-Bahrayn (English: Caretaker/Ruler of Bahrain). The Hakim also held the honorific title of sheikh.

Portrait	Name (Birth–Death)	Reign	Notes
	Sheikh; Ahmed bin Muhammad bin Khalifa	1783 – 18 July 1795	Leader of the 1783 Arab invasion
	Sheikh; Salman bin Ahmad Al Khalifa	1795 – 1825	As co-regent
	Sheikh; Abdullah bin Ahmad Al Khalifa	1795 – 1843	As co-regent
	Sheikh; Khalifa bin Sulman Al Khalifa	1825 – 1834	As co-regent with Abdullah bin Ahmad Al Khalifa
	Sheikh; Muhammad bin Khalifa Al Khalifa	1834 – 1842	First reign as co-regent with Abdullah bin Ahmad Al Khalifa
	Sheikh; Muhammad bin Khalifa Al Khalifa	1843 – 1868	Second reign
	Sheikh; Ali bin Khalifa Al Khalifa	1868 – 1869	
	Sheikh; Muhammad bin Khalifa Al Khalifa	1869	Third reign
	Sheikh; Muhammad bin Abdullah Al Khalifa	September – 1 December 1869	Deposed and exiled to India. Confined at Asirgarh Fort, but later removed to Chunar Fort, near Benares, where he died in 1877.
	Sheikh; Isa bin Ali Al Khalifa (1848–1932)	1 December 1869 – 26 May 1923	Abdicated
	Sheikh; Hamad bin Isa Al Khalifa (1872–1942)	27 May 1923 – 20 February 1942	
	Sheikh; Salman bin Hamad Al Khalifa (1894–1961)	20 February 1942 – 2 November 1961	
	Sheikh; Isa bin Salman Al Khalifa (1931–1999)	2 November 1961 – 16 August 1971	

=== Emirs of Bahrain (1971–2002) ===
The Arabic title of the Emir, as transliterated, was Amir dawlat al-Bahrayn (English: Chief of the State of Bahrain). The Emir also held the honorific title of sheikh.

Name	Lifespan	Reign start	Reign end	Notes	Family	Image
Sheikh; Isa bin Salman Al Khalifa: عيسى بن سلمان آل خليفة	3 June 1931 – 6 March 1999 (aged 67)	16 August 1971	6 March 1999	Son of Salman bin Hamad Al Khalifa and Mouza bint Hamad Al Khalifa	Khalifa	Isa bin Salman Al Khalifa of Bahrain
Sheikh; Hamad bin Isa Al Khalifa: حمد بن عيسى آل خليفة	28 January 1950 (age 76)	6 March 1999	14 February 2002 (title changed)	Son of Isa bin Salman Al Khalifa and Hessa bint Salman Al Khalifa	Khalifa	Hamad bin Isa Al Khalifa of Bahrain

=== King of Bahrain (2002–present) ===
The Arabic title of the King, as transliterated, is Malik al-Bahrayn (English: King of Bahrain). The King also holds the honorific title of sheikh.

Name	Lifespan	Reign start	Reign end	Notes	Family	Image
King; Hamad bin Isa Al Khalifa: حمد بن عيسى آل خليفة	28 January 1950 (age 76)	14 February 2002	Incumbent	Son of Isa bin Salman Al Khalifa and Hessa bint Salman Al Khalifa	Khalifa	Hamad bin Isa Al Khalifa of Bahrain

== Family tree ==
House of Khalifa

Ahmad bin Muhammad^{(1)} r. 1783–1795
Salman ibn Ahmad^{(2)} r. 1796–1821	Abdullah ibn Ahmad^{(3)} r. 1796–1843
Khalifa bin Salman^{(4)} r. 1825–1834	Muhammad bin Abdullah^{(7)} r. 1869
Muhammad bin Khalifa^{(5)} r. 1834–1842, 1843–1868, 1869	Ali bin Khalifa^{(6)} r. 1868–1869
Isa bin Ali^{(8)} r. 1869–1932
Hamad bin Isa^{(9)} r. 1932–1942
Salman bin Hamad^{(10)} r. 1942–1961
Isa bin Salman^{(11)} r. 1961–1999
Hamad bin Isa^{(12)} r. 1999–present

== Ruling Family Council ==
Decisions pertaining to the Al Khalifa family, as well as disputes between family members are arbitrated by the Ruling Family Council (Arabic: مجلس العائلة الحاكمة). The council attends to internal family disputes particularly those related to appropriation of land, sale of real estate, and other properties. Members of the ruling family are not allowed to refer these or other disputes to ordinary law courts.

Relations between the political leadership and the rest of the "rank and file" members of the Al Khalifa ruling family have been formally managed by the council since 1932. However, on the eve of the 1973 parliamentary elections, the then Emir Isa bin Salman Al Khalifa issued a decree restructuring the Ruling Family Council to become a formal organ of the state, and giving the administrative head of the council the rank of Minister.

The Ruling Family Council is chaired by King Hamad, its deputy chairman is Mohammed bin Khalifa bin Hamad Al Khalifa, and the director general is Ibrahim bin Khalid bin Mohammed Al Khalifa.

The King appoints the members of the board of the Ruling Family Council as recognized representatives of various kingship lines and factional alliances within the Al Khalifa family.

== Cabinet ministers ==
As of 2024, 4 out of 25 serving cabinet ministers of Bahrain were members of the Al Khalifa royal family.

- Prince Salman bin Hamad Al Khalifa, Prime Minister, The Crown Prince, and Deputy Supreme Commander
- Shaikh Khalid bin Abdullah Al Khalifa, Deputy Prime Minister
- Shaikh Rashid bin Abdulla Al Khalifa, Minister of Interior
- Shaikh Salman bin Khalifa Al Khalifa, Minister of Finance and National Economy

== Notable people ==
- Sheikha Dheya bint Ebrahim Al Khalifa, royal family member and President of the Riyada Group of Companies

== Controversies ==
The King of Bahrain, Sheikh Hamad bin Isa Al Khalifa was responsible for attacks on protesters during the Arab Spring. The king and the government were condemned both locally and overseas. They later enlisted the help of nearby Saudi Arabia and the United Arab Emirates.

Bahrain Police and protesters clash violently on 13 March 2011.

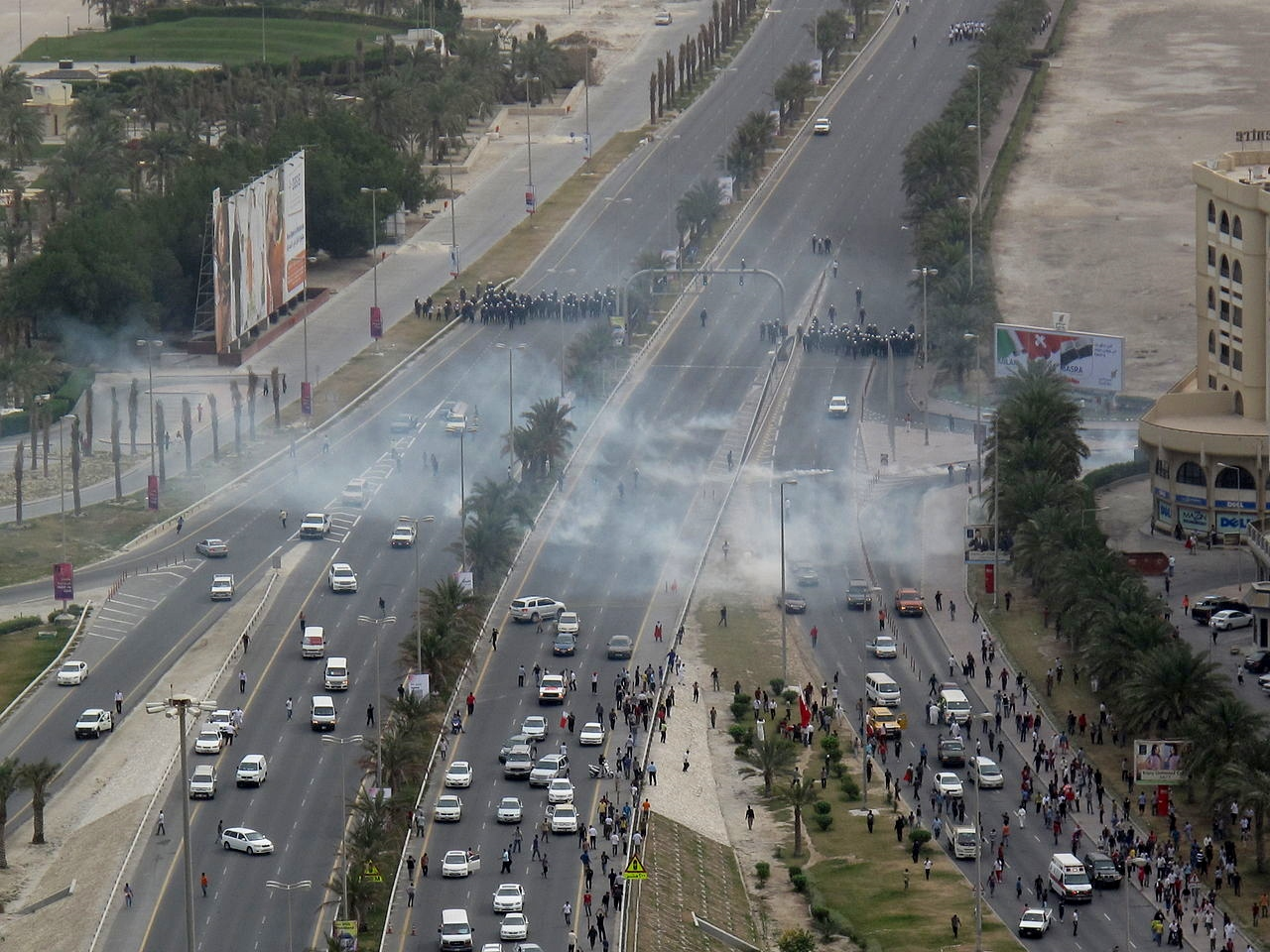

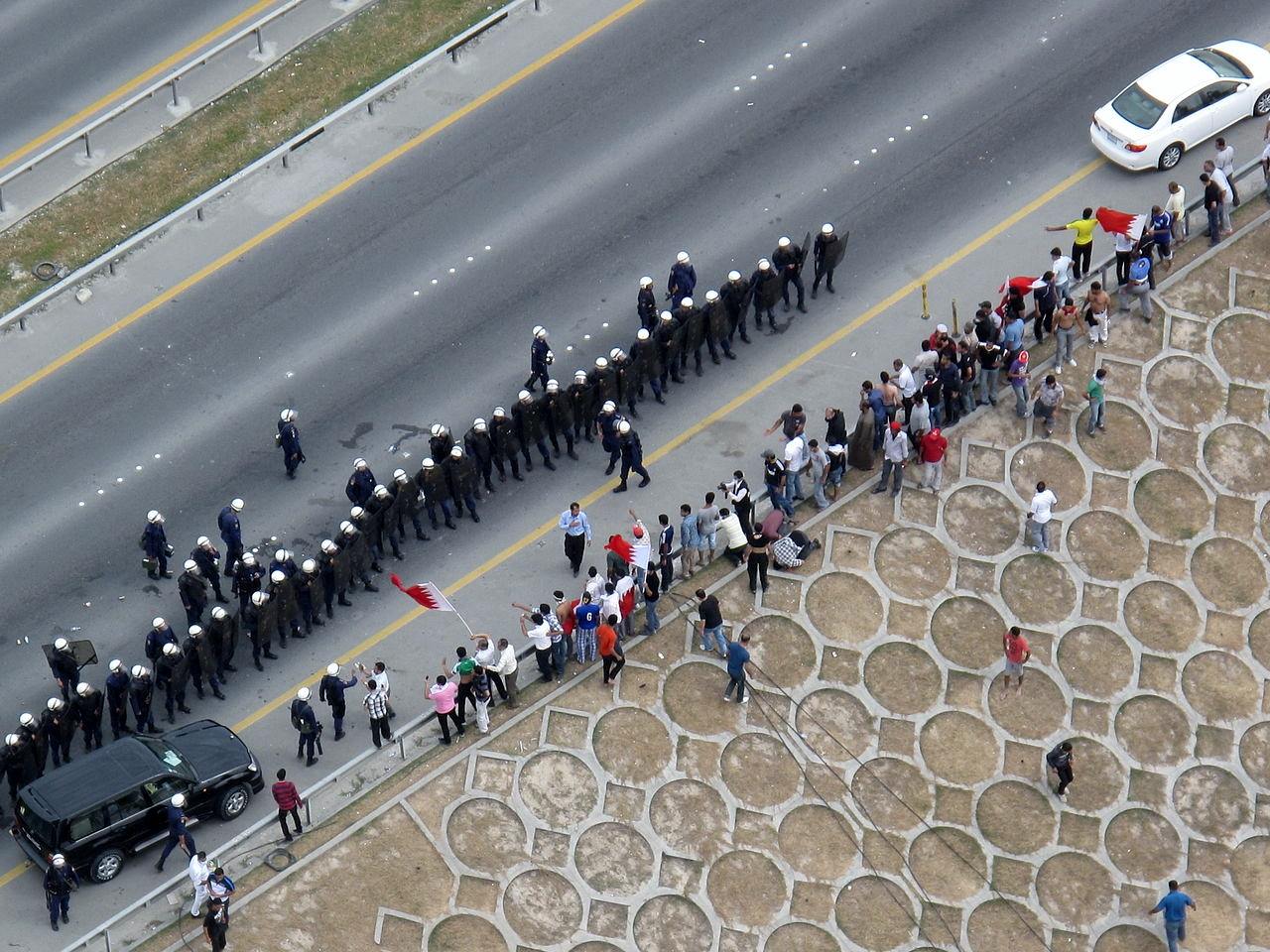

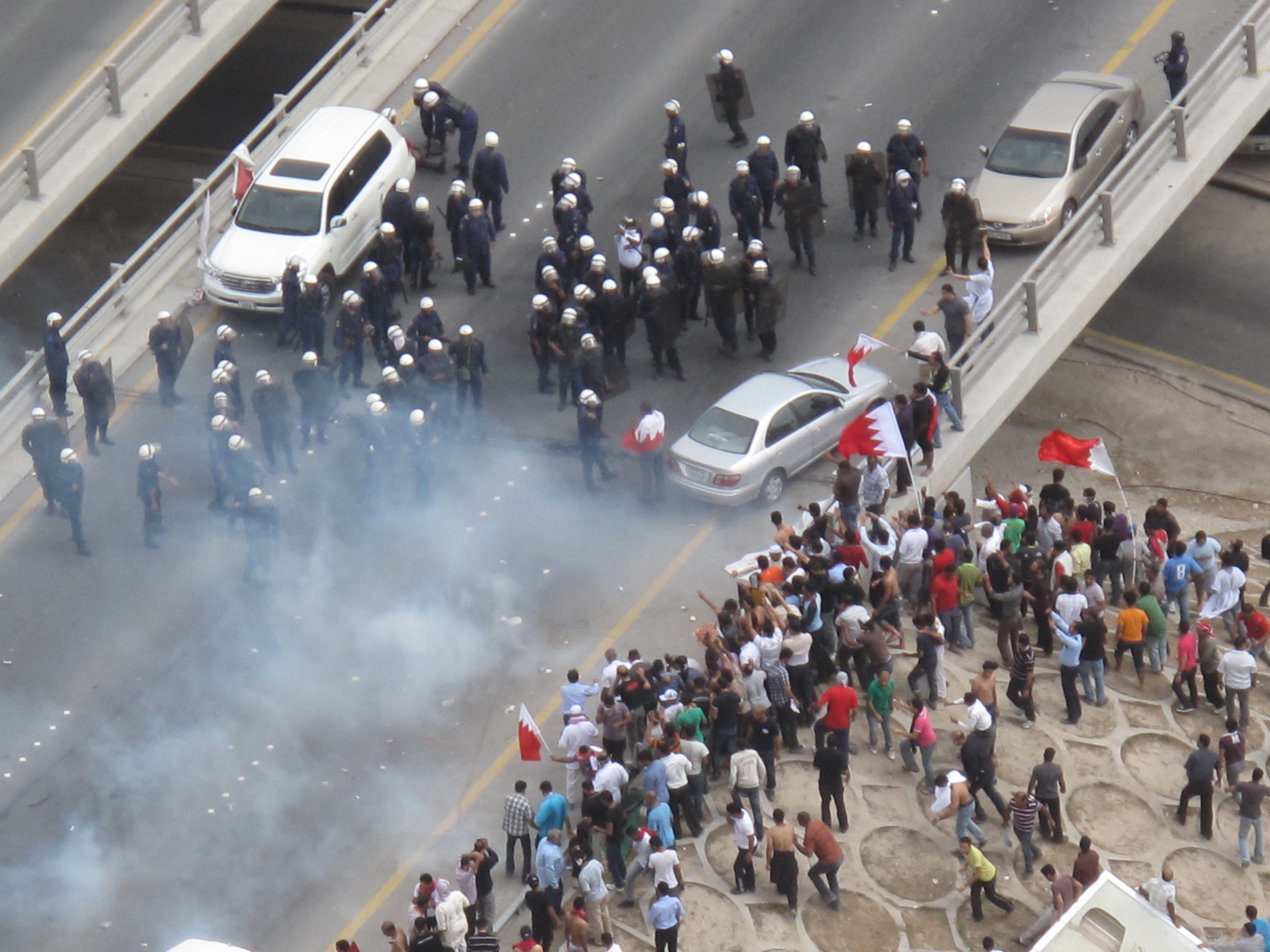

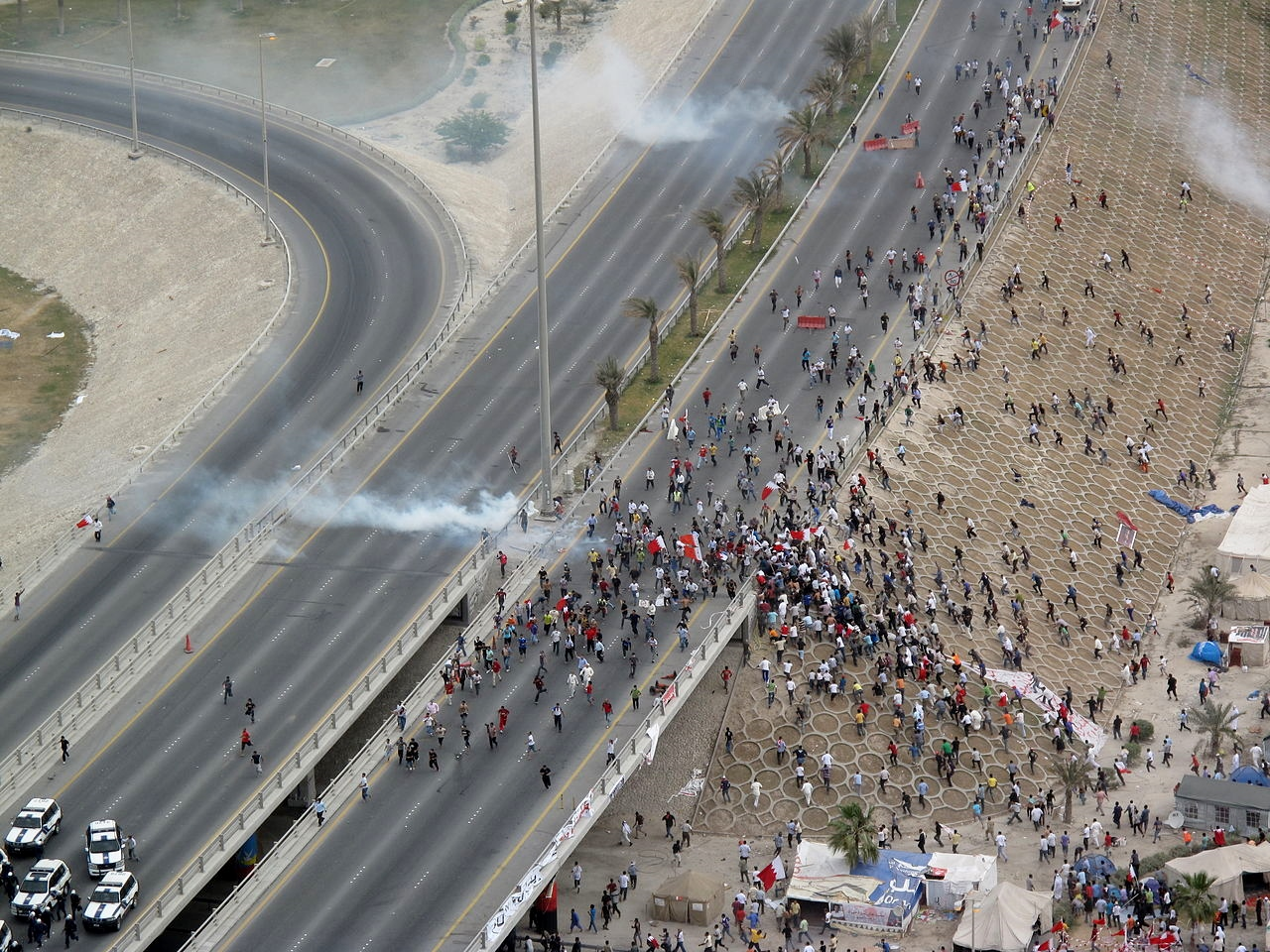

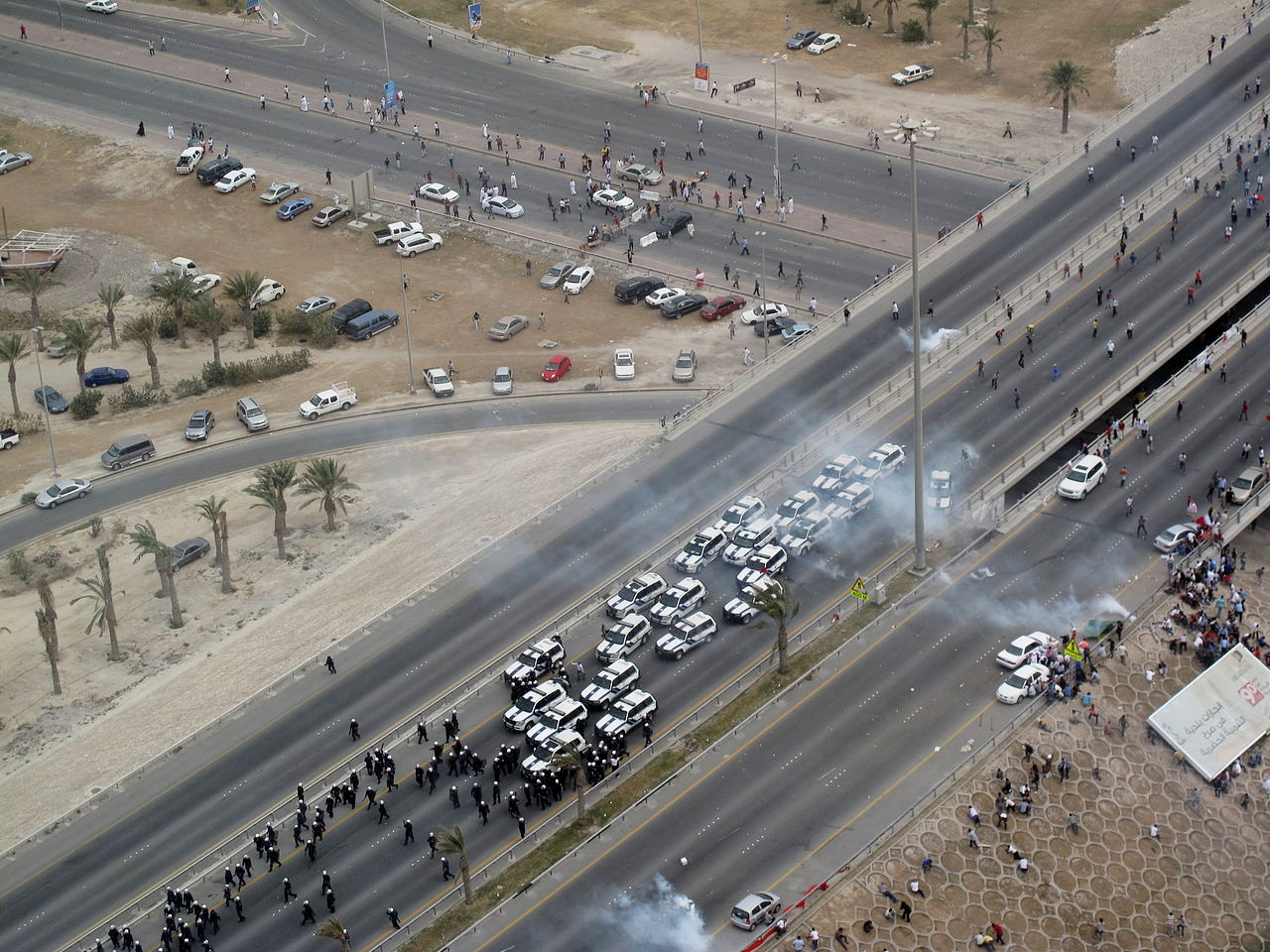

== See also ==
- List of Arabian royal houses
