= Isa bin Salman Al Khalifa =

Hakim/Emir of Bahrain from 1961 to 1999

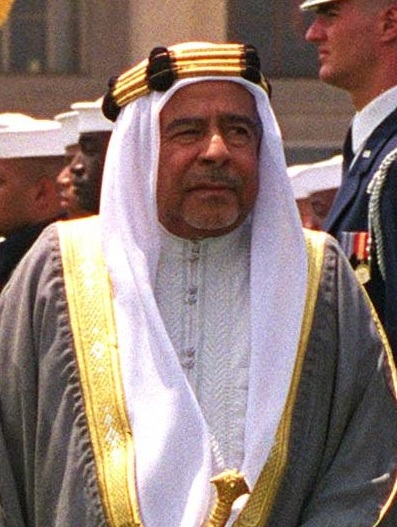
- Isa bin Salman in 1998

Emir of Bahrain
- Reign: 16 August 1971 – 6 March 1999
- Predecessor: Position established Himself (as Hakim)
- Successor: Hamad bin Isa Al Khalifa
- Prime Minister: Khalifa bin Salman Al Khalifa

Hakim of Bahrain
- Reign: 2 November 1961 – 16 August 1971
- Coronation: 16 December 1961
- Predecessor: Salman bin Hamad Al Khalifa
- Successor: Position abolished Himself (as Emir)
- Prime Minister: Khalifa bin Salman Al Khalifa
- Born: 3 June 1933; Jasra, Bahrain (Note: Bahrain was under the Persian Gulf Residency as a British protectorate state at the time of Hamad's birth.)
- Died: 6 March 1999 (aged 65); Manama, Bahrain (Note: Bahrain was officially known as the State of Bahrain at the time of Hamad's death.)
- Burial: Al Rifa'a Cemetery
- Spouse: Hessa bint Salman Al Khalifa (m. 1949)
- Issue: Hamad; Sheikh Rashid; Sheikh Mohammed; Sheikh Abdullah; Sheikh Ali; Sheikha Muneera; Sheikha Maryam; Sheikha Shaikha; Sheikha Noora
- House: Khalifa
- Father: Salman bin Hamad Al Khalifa
- Mother: Moza bint Hamad Al Khalifa
- Religion: Sunni Islam

Isa bin Salman bin Hamad Al Khalifa (Arabic: عيسى بن سلمان آل خليفة; 3 June 1933 – 6 March 1999) was the ruler of Bahrain from 1961 until his death in 1999. A member of the House of Khalifa, he ruled as Hakim until 1971 and for the remainder of his reign as Emir.

Born in Jasra, Bahrain, he ascended the throne upon the death of his father, Salman bin Hamad Al Khalifa.

== Early life and reign ==
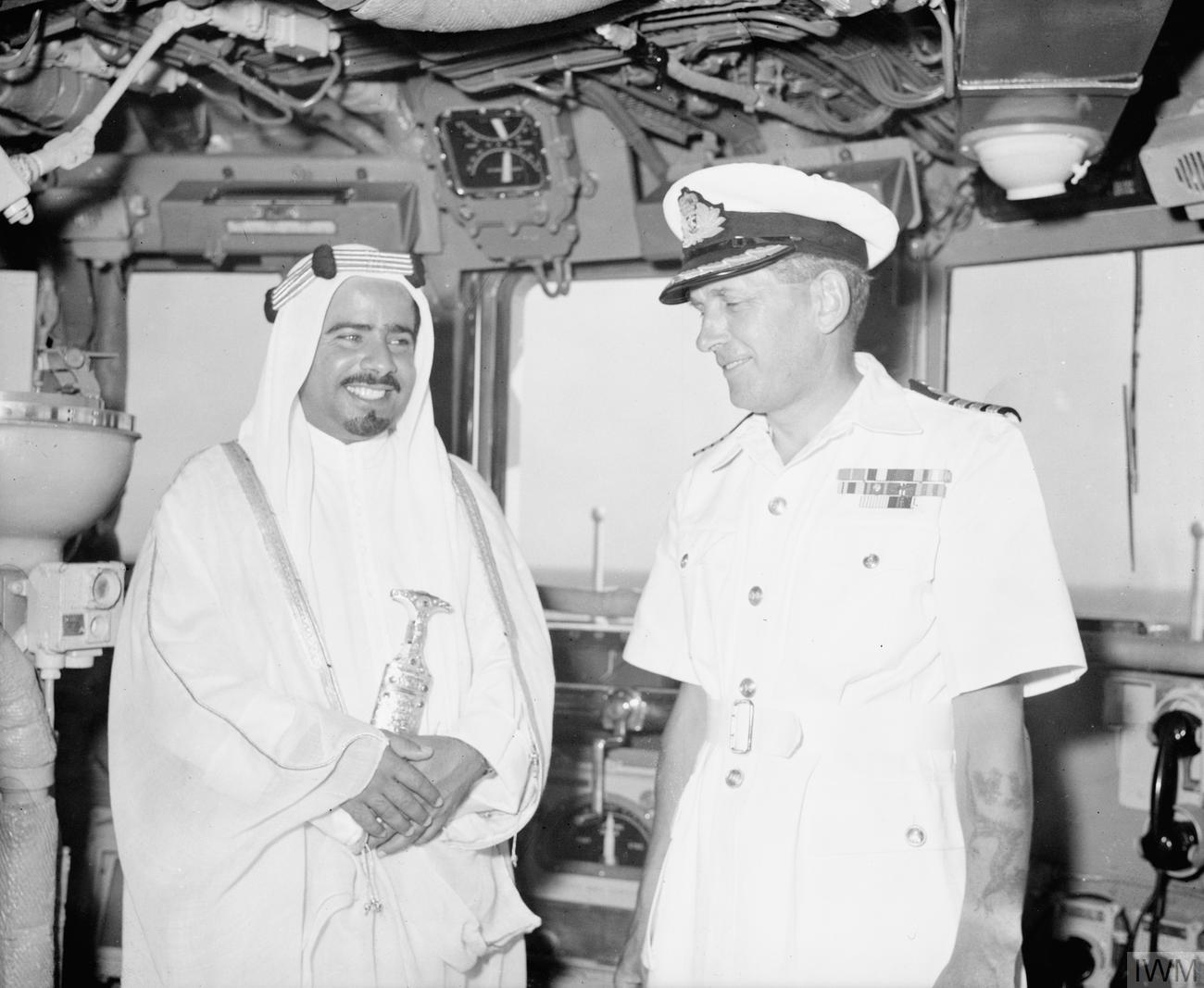
Isa bin Salman Al Khalifa aboard HMS Centaur with Admiral Sir Horace Law (1959)

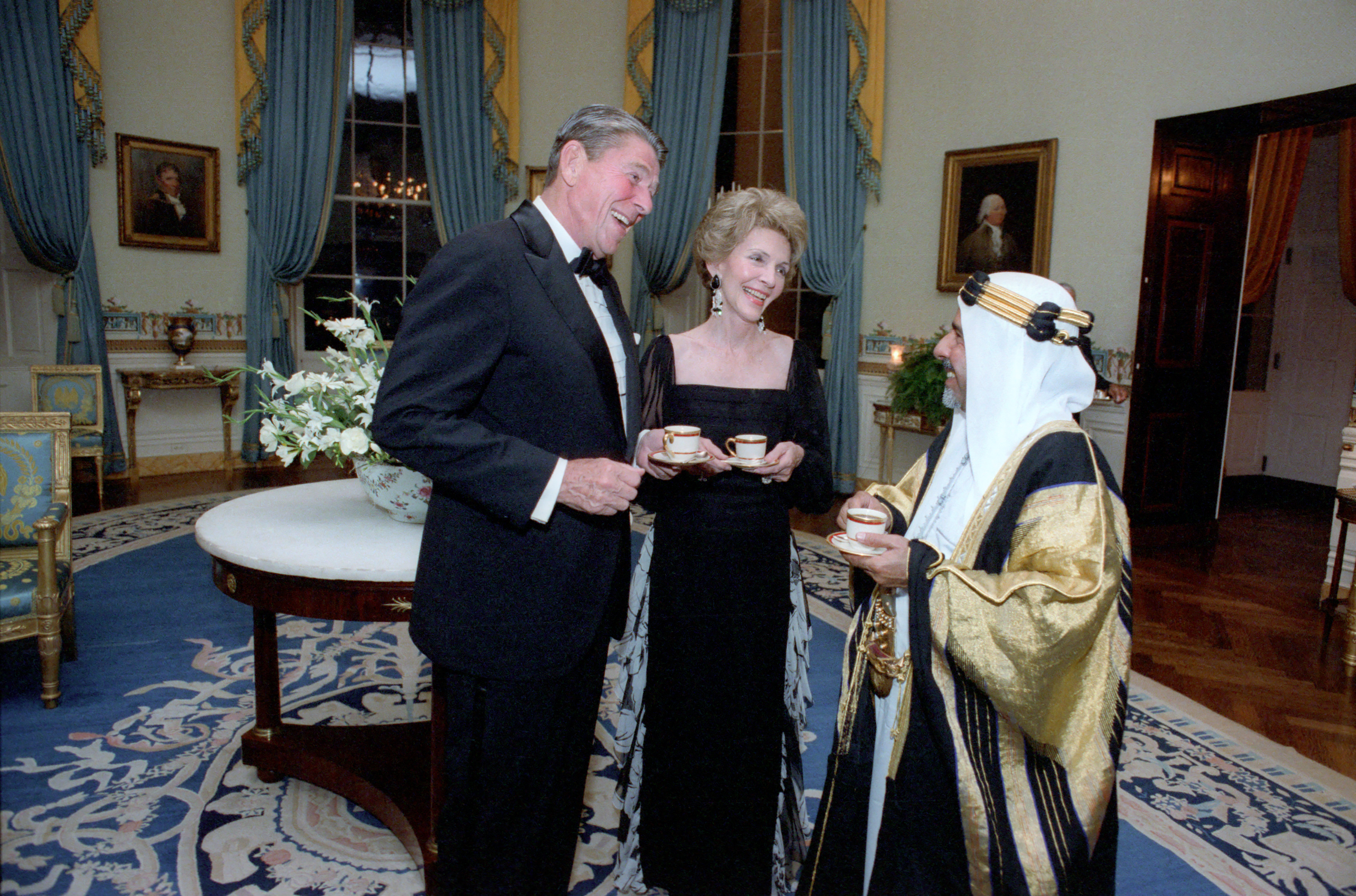
Ronald and Nancy Reagan with Isa bin Salman Al Khalifa before the state dinner, 1983

Isa was born in Jasra to Salman bin Hamad Al Khalifa and Mouza bint Hamad Al Khalifa (1917-2011), the daughter of Hamad ibn Abdullah Al Khalifa, and succeeded his father as emir upon his death in November 1961. He was installed on 16 December.

Isa visited Ayetollah Mohsin Al Hakim in Najaf in 1968 to indicate his keenness to reinforce relationships with the Shia.

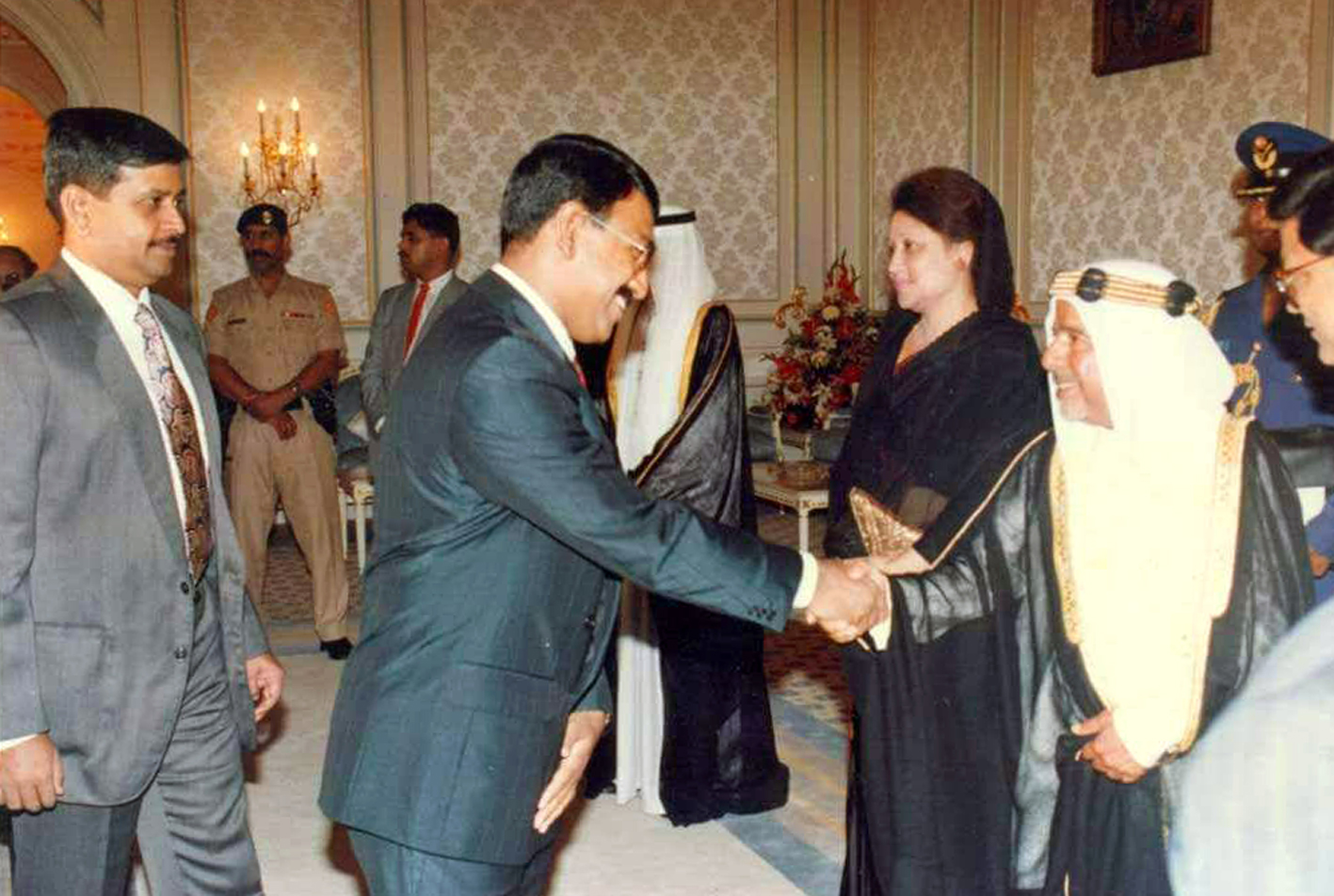
Mohammad Mosaddak Ali with Emir of Bahrain Isa bin Salman Al Khalifa at the Kings Palace in Bahrain in 1994

During his reign, Bahrain gained independence from the United Kingdom in 1971. While the government initially considered joining the United Arab Emirates, Isa had his country withdraw (along with Qatar) over his dissatisfaction with the proposed constitution. He then attempted to introduce a moderate form of parliamentary democracy, and men (though not women) were given the vote in parliamentary elections in 1973. In August 1975, however, he dissolved Parliament because it refused to pass the government-sponsored State Security Law of 1974. The parliamentary system was never restored in his lifetime despite occasional protests from the leftist and Islamist camps, which reached their peak in 1994 (see: History of Bahrain).

During his reign there was an arrangement between him and his brother, Sheikh Khalifa bin Salman, whereby the Emir was assigned a diplomatic and ceremonial role, while Khalifa controlled the government and economy as Prime Minister.

Isa was one of the founders of the Dar Al Maal Al Islami Trust which was initiated by Saudi royal Mohammed bin Faisal Al Saud, King Faisal's son, in 1981.

== Marriage and children ==
Isa bin Salman Al Khalifa had one wife, his cousin Sheikha Hessa bint Salman Al Khalifa (1933–2009), daughter of Salman bin Ibrahim Al Khalifa. They married on 8 May 1949. They had five sons and four daughters:

- Hamad bin Isa (1950–), current king
- Rashed bin Isa (–17 December 2011)
- Mohammed bin Isa, Commander of the National Guard (1997–2008)
- Abdullah bin Isa, Vice President of the Higher Committee for the Horseback riding club
- Ali bin Isa, Minister of the Royal Court Affairs (1955–)
- Munira bint Isa
- Maryam bint Isa
- Shaikha bint Isa
- Noura bint Isa

== Legacy and death ==
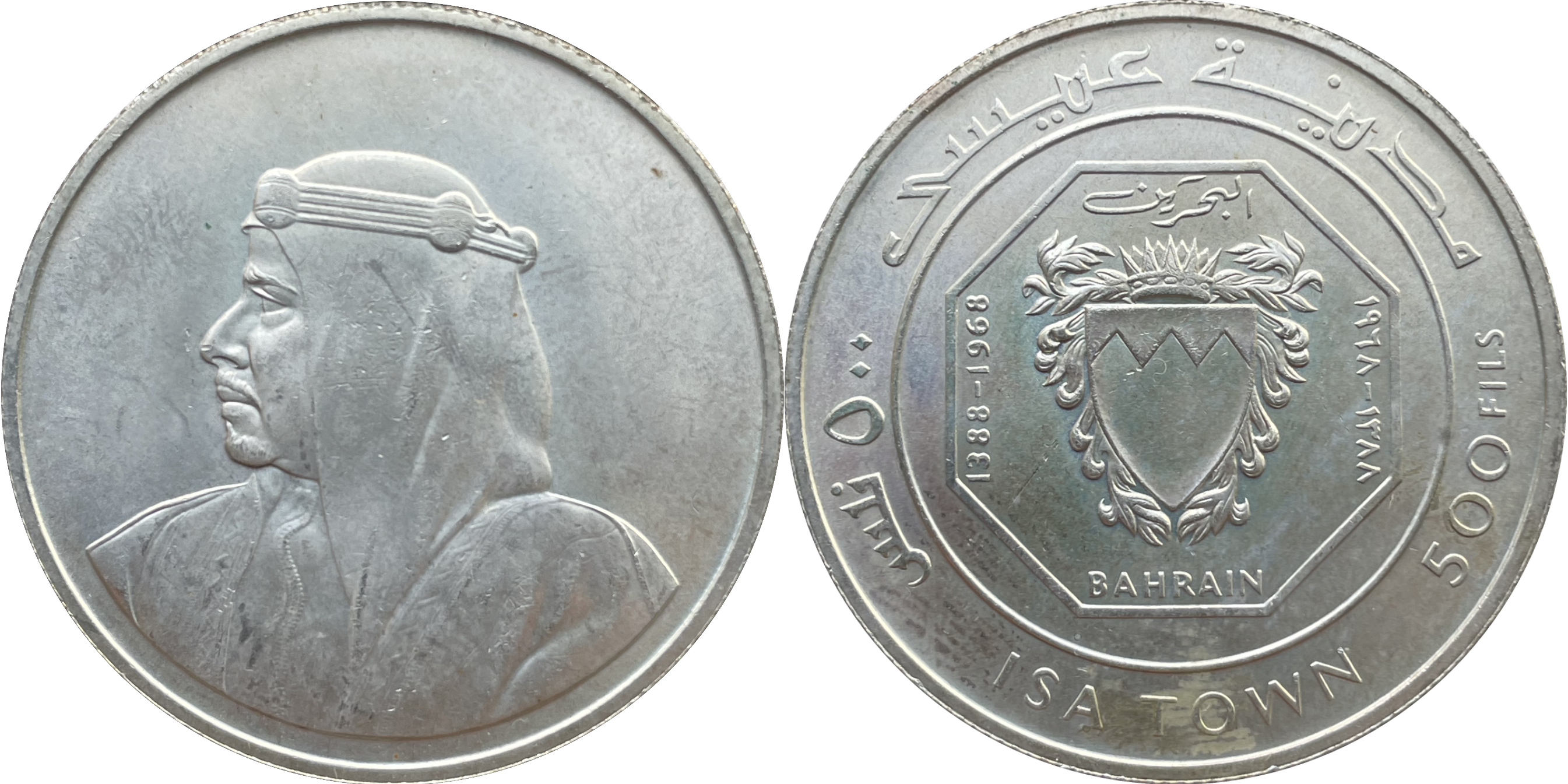
Silver coin: 500 Fils of Bahrain, with portrait of Isa bin Salman on the front

During his 38 years as Emir, the economic transformation of Bahrain into a modern nation and a key financial centre in the Persian Gulf area took place. Nevertheless, critics note that he also dissolved Parliament, taking on absolute power.

Isa bin Salman Al Khalifa died of a heart attack on 6 March 1999 at the Government House in Manama, shortly after a meeting with the United States defense secretary William Cohen. He was 65. The last function he attended was the funeral of King Hussein of Jordan, which took place less than a month before his death.

US President Bill Clinton expressed "deep sadness", as did Graham at the news of the emir's death calling him "a good friend of peace". UN Secretary-General Kofi Annan also expressed "great sadness", and described the emir as "a force for stability" in the region. He was buried at the Al-Rifa'a cemetery.

He was succeeded by his eldest son, Hamad bin Isa Al Khalifa.

== Foreign honours ==
- Spain: Grand Collar of the Order of Isabella the Catholic (4 December 1981)
- Egypt: Grand Collar of the Order of the Nile
- France: Grand Cross of the National Order of the Legion of Honor
- Germany: Grand Cross of the Order of Merit of the Federal Republic of Germany
- Iran: Grand Collar of the Order of Pahlavi
- Kingdom of Iraq:
  - Order of the Two Rivers 1st Class (x/5/1968, 2nd Class 3 April 1952)
  - King Faisal II Installation Medal (2 May 1953)
- Jordan:
  - Grand Cordon with Collar of the Order of al-Hussein bin Ali
  - Grand Cordon of the Supreme Order of the Renaissance
- Kuwait: Collar of the Order of Mubarak the Great of Kuwait
- Lebanon: Grand Cordon of the Order of the Cedar (2nd Class, 1958)
- Morocco: Collar of the Order of Muhammad
- Oman: Civil Order of Oman, 1st Class
- Qatar: Collar of the Order of the Independence of the State
- South Africa: Grand Cross of the Order of Good Hope (1995)
- Syria: Grand Cross of the Order of Umayyad
- Tunisia: Grand Cross of the Order of the Independence
- UAE: Order of Al-Nahayyan 1st Class
- Empire of Iran: Commemorative Medal of the 2500th Anniversary of the founding of the Persian Empire (14 October 1971).
- United Kingdom:
  - Honorary Knight Commander (KCMG, 14 July 1964) and Honorary Knight Grand Cross (GCMG, 15 February 1979) of the Order of St Michael and St George
  - Honorary Knight Grand Cross of the Order of the Bath (GCB, 10 April 1984)
  - Queen Elizabeth II Coronation Medal (2 June 1953)

== Titles ==
- 1933–1942: Sheikh Isa bin Salman Al Khalifa
- 1942–1961: His Excellency Sheikh Isa bin Salman Al Khalifa
- 1961–1964: His Highness Sheikh Isa II bin Salman Al Khalifa, Hakim of Bahrain
- 1964–1971: His Highness Sheikh Sir Isa II bin Salman Al Khalifa, Hakim of Bahrain, KCMG
- 1971–1999: His Highness Sheikh Isa II bin Salman Al Khalifa, Emir of Bahrain

== See also ==
- 1990s uprising in Bahrain
- Al Khalifa

== Notes ==
Regnal titles
Preceded by Salman bin Hamad Al Khalifa	Emir of Bahrain; 1961–1999	Succeeded by Hamad bin Isa Al Khalifa
