= Hakim (title) =

Arabic titles

Ḥakīm and Ḥākim are two Arabic titles derived from the same triliteral root Ḥ-K-M "appoint, choose, judge".

== Ḥakīm (حكيم) ==
This title is one of the 99 Names of God in Islam.

Ḥakīm (alternative transcription Hakeem) indicates a "wise man" or "physician", or in general, a practitioner of herbal medicine, especially of Unani and Islamic medicine, like Hakim Ajmal Khan, Hakim Said, Hakim Syed Zillur Rahman, etc.

Ḥakīm or Hakeem (Hindi: हकीम, Urdu: حکیم, Punjabi: Gurmukhi: ਹਕੀਮ, Shahmukhi: حکیم) is also used for practitioner of the Islamic medicine, those versed in indigenous system of medicines.

Ḥakīm was also used more generally during the Islamic Golden Age to refer to polymath scholars who were knowledgeable in religion, medicine, the sciences, and Islamic philosophy.

Some examples of Ḥakīm are:

- Avicenna
- Omar Khayyam

=== Uses ===
- In old Abyssinia or Ethiopia, Hakim usually meant a learned person, usually a physician. Hence a Hakim-Bejt was a doctor's house or hospital.
- In Bangladesh, India and Pakistan, Hakim or Hakeem denotes a Muslim herbal medicine practitioner, specially of Unani medicine.
- In Turkey, hekim denotes a physician, while hakim can be used for a very wise person or philosopher. (See also the use of the homonymous word hakim for a judge, mentioned below.)

== Ḥākim (حاكم) ==
Ḥākim (alternative transcription Hakem) means a ruler, governor or judge. As with many titles, it also occurs as a part of the names of many individuals.

=== In Arab countries ===
- In Lebanon, the full title of the Emirs under Ottoman (and a while Egyptian) sovereignty was al-Amir al-Hakim (الأمير الحكيم), 1516–1842
- In three future Persian Gulf emirates, the first monarchic style was hakim:
  - Since 1783 when the conquering al-Khalifah lineage settles on Bahrain to 16 August 1971, its style was Hakim al-Bahrayn (حكيم البحرين, 'Ruler of Bahrain'), then Amir Dawlat al-Bahrayn (أمير دولة البحرين, 'Emir of the State of Bahrain'); since 14 February 2002, they have been styled Malik al-Bahrayn (ملك البحرين, 'King of Bahrain').
  - In Kuwait, since its 1752 founding, the ruling Al Sabah dynasty's style was Hakim al-Kuwayt (حكيم الكويت, 'Ruler of Kuwait'), from 1871 also Kaymakam (قایمقام): district administrator, while recognizing the sovereignty of the Ottoman Empire (as kazan [district] of Baghdad and from 1875 Basra Vilayet (ولایت, seats of the governors, styled Wali, in Iraq) until 3 November 1914, then under British protectorate) until independence on 19 June 1961. Since then the style has officially been Amir ad-Dawlat al-Kuwayt (أمير الدولة الكويت, 'Emir of the State of Kuwait');
  - Since on Muhammad ibn Thani's 12 September 1868 treaty with the British, effectively establishing Qatar (previously considered to be a dependency of Bahrain) as an independent State (limited to Doha and Wakrah, only later expanded to the entire peninsula), his al-Thani dynasty's style was Hakim Qatar (حكيم قطر, 'Ruler of Qatar'). From 1871, they were also styked Kaymakam, Ottoman district administrator, as with Kuwait above, until 3 November 1916, thereafter under British protectorate. Since independence from Britain on 3 September 1971, the style has been Amir Dawlat Qatar (أمير دولة قطر, 'Emir of the State of Qatar').
- In Libya, Hakim was the 1946 – 12 February 1950 style of the "ruler" of the former sultanate of Fezzan (فزان) during the UN administration (in practice by France, with its own concurrent military governor); the only incumbent, Ahmad Sayf an-Nasr (born c. 1876, died 1954), stayed on as regional wali (governor; in French Chef du territoire 'head of the territory') in the united Libyan kingdom until 24 December 1951, with a French Resident at his side, and then, without such French shadow, as first royal governor (until 1954).
- In Yemen until 1902 (changed to Sultan) the rulers of the Quaiti State of Shir and Mukalla, ash-Shihr Wa´l Mukalla, as before the 10 November 1881 merger with the Naqib of Mukalla's state it has been the princely style of ash-Shihr since independence from the Ottomans in 1866.

=== Elsewhere ===
- In the Makran region of Sistan and Baluchestan Province in Iran, hakom refers to sardars and khans in the traditional Baluchi government.
- In Indonesia, Malaysia and Turkey, hakim denotes a judge.
- In Nepal, a Bada Hakim was in charge of a district of the realm.
- In the Emirate of Bukhara, hakem was the title of a governor.
- In Nigeria, the Sokoto Caliphate is ceremonially governed by hakimai (sing. "hakimi"), chiefs that are answerable to the Sultan of Sokoto and the Emirs of the realm.
- In Uzbekistan, the term hokim is used to describe a governor or mayor of a region.
- In Kazakhstan, the term äkim is used to describe local-level mayors or governors of regions within the country.

=== Furthermore ===
As with many titles, the word also occurs in many personal names, without any noble or political significance.

== See also ==
- Sharif
