= 2027 in Bahrain =

- Decades: 2000s; 2010s; 2020s
- See also: Other events of 2027; Timeline of Bahraini history

Events in the year 2027 in Bahrain.

== Events ==
=== Predicted or scheduled ===
- Next Bahraini general election

== Holidays ==
- 1 January - New Year's Day
- 10–12 March – Eid al-Fitr
- 1 May - Labour Day
- 16 May - Arafat Day
- 16–19 May – Eid al-Adha
- 6 June – Muharram
- 15–16 June – Ashura
- 15 August – The Prophet's Birthday
- 16–17 December – National Day
