= 2026 in Bahrain =

- Decades: 2000s; 2010s; 2020s
- See also: Other events of 2026; Timeline of Bahraini history

Events in the year 2026 in Bahrain.

== Incumbents ==
Photo	Post	Name
	King of Bahrain	Hamad bin Isa Al Khalifa
	Prime Minister of Bahrain	Salman bin Hamad Al Khalifa

== Events ==
=== January ===
- 2 January – Bahrain assumes a two-year non-permanent seat at the United Nations Security Council.
- 8 January – Political activist Ibrahim Sharif is sentenced to six months' imprisonment for criticizing Arab states and calling for more support for Palestine in an interview.

=== February ===
- 28 February –
  - In retaliation for the 2026 Israeli–United States strikes on Iran, Iran launches ballistic missiles at a United States Navy facility in Bahrain, targeting the headquarters of the U.S. Fifth Fleet.
  - Iranian drones strike residential areas of Manama, including a direct hit on a 20-storey tower block.

=== March ===
- 1 March – An Iranian drone strikes the Crowne Plaza Hotel in Manama, which houses US embassy personnel. No casualties are reported.
- 5 March – The Bahrain Defence Force reports that 74 Iranian missiles and 117 hostile drones haven been intercepted and destroyed in the last hours.
- 6 March – Iran carries out a drone attack on the Financial Harbour Towers commercial complex in Manama housing the Israeli embassy.
- 8 March –
  - An Iranian drone damages a desalination plant. Falling missile debris injures three people and damages a university building in Manama.
  - An explosion near Manama causes a fire near a petroleum refinery and injures at least 32 Bahraini citizens, four of them seriously. An analysis by academic researchers examined by Reuters finds that an American-operated Patriot missile was likely involved in the blast after it downed an Iranian drone mid-air.
- 12 March – An Iranian strike hits fuel storage tanks at a facility in Muharraq Governorate.
- 28 March – The smelter facility of Aluminium Bahrain in Askar, Southern Governorate, is targeted by Iranian attacks.
- 29 March – Bahrain imposes a nighttime maritime curfew from 6:00 pm to 4:00 am to restrict sea traffic and strengthen coastal security following reported attacks attributed to Iran.

=== April ===
- 2 April – Iran conducts strikes on Amazon Web Services servers in Bahrain.
- 5 April – The state-owned energy company Bapco Energies reports an Iranian drone attack on one of its storage facilities, causing an oil tank to catch fire.

=== June ===
- 2 June – An officer of the National Security Agency is sentenced to life imprisonment over the death of a detainee arrested for expressing support for Iran during the ongoing war.
- 11 June – One person is injured in Iranian drone attacks on Hamad Town and Manama.
- 27 July – The Supreme Court of the United Kingdom rejects Bahrain's attempt to use state immunity to block a spyware lawsuit brought by two dissidents.

=== July ===
- 24 July – The United States imposes a 12.5% tariff on Bahrain, citing the presence of alleged forced labour in the supply chain.

=== November ===
- 8 November – The Gulf Cooperation Council (GCC) countries strike an agreement to advance the Gulf Railway, connecting their respective transportation networks.
- 10 November – During a meeting in Bahrain, the GCC authorizes the establishment of a headquarters for its Unified Military Command in Kuwait.
- 16 November – Bahrain sentences 64 Shias to life imprisonment and five others to 15 years for running a militant group connected to Iran's Quds Force.

== Holidays ==
- 1 January - New Year's Day
- 19–20 March – Eid al-Fitr
- 1 May - Labour Day
- 26–27 May – Eid al-Adha
- 16 June – Islamic New Year
- 25–26 June – Ashura
- 25 August – The Prophet's Birthday
- 16–17 December – National Day

== Deaths ==
- 17 November – Nabeel Rajab, 62, human rights activist.
