= 2012 in Bahrain =

- Decades: 1990s; 2000s; 2010s; 2020s
- See also: Other events of 2012; Timeline of Bahraini history

The following lists events that happened during 2012 in Bahrain.

== Incumbents ==
- Monarch: Hamad ibn Isa Al Khalifa
- Prime Minister: Khalifa bin Salman Al Khalifa

== Events ==
=== January ===
- January 1 - A funeral of a Bahraini youth killed the previous day (December 31) in a protest turns into another protest with police forced to use tear gas.
- January 15 - Opposition leaders and activists say reforms proposed by King Hamad bin Isa Al Khalifa are "cosmetic" and will do little to stop the uprising.
- January 27 - Amnesty International calls for an investigation into the fatal tear gassing of residential areas by Bahraini security forces.

=== March ===
- March 31 - Ahmed Ismail Hassan, a journalist and videographer, was shot and killed by security forces.

=== April ===
- April 10 - Seven policemen were injured after protesters threw a pipe bomb with gasoline.
- April 22 - Sebastian Vettel won the 2012 Bahrain Grand Prix during protests.

=== November ===
- November 5 - Five bombs exploded in Manama, killing two people.
