= United Nations Security Council Resolution 278 =

UN Security Council Resolution 278
- Date: May 11 1970
- Meeting no.: 1,536
- Code: S/RES/278 (Document)
- Subject: The Question of Bahrain
- Voting summary: 15 voted for; None voted against; None abstained
- Result: Adopted

Security Council composition
- Permanent members: China; France; Soviet Union; United Kingdom; United States
- Non-permanent members: Burundi; Colombia; Finland; Nepal; Poland; Spain; Syria; Zambia

United Nations Security Council Resolution 278, adopted unanimously on May 11, 1970, after statements from representatives of Iran and the United Kingdom, the Council endorsed the report of the Personal Representative of the Secretary-General and welcomed its conclusion, particularly the finding that "the overwhelming majority of the people of Bahrain wish to gain recognition of their identity in a full independent and sovereign State free to decide for itself its relations with other States".

After World War II, Bahrain became the centre for British administration of the lower Persian Gulf. In 1968, when the British Government announced its decision to end the treaty relationships with the Persian Gulf sheikdoms, Bahrain joined with Qatar and the seven Trucial States (which now form the United Arab Emirates) under British protection in an effort to form a union of Arab emirates. By mid-1971, however, the nine sheikhdoms still had not agreed on the terms of union. Accordingly, Bahrain sought independence as a separate entity declaring independence on August 15, 1971, and becoming formally independent as the State of Bahrain on December 16, 1971.

== See also ==
- History of Bahrain
- List of United Nations Security Council Resolutions 201 to 300 (1965–1971)
