= 2019 in Bahrain =

- Decades: 1990s; 2000s; 2010s; 2020s
- See also: Other events of 2019; Timeline of Bahraini history

Events in the year 2019 in Bahrain.

== Incumbents ==
- Monarch: Hamad ibn Isa Al Khalifa
- Prime Minister: Khalifa bin Salman Al Khalifa

== Events ==
- 4 February – 25-year-old Australian footballer and refugee from Bahrain, Hakeem al-Araibi, is ordered to defend an extradition order back to Bahrain in a Bangkok court, after being detained upon arrival in Thailand for his honeymoon with his wife in November 2018. International community is treating it as a human rights issue; a campaign to free al-Araibi and return him to Australia is growing.
- 14 March – USS Devastator is damaged by fire while at a Bahrain dock.
- 28 June – More than 200 demonstrators break into the courtyard of Bahrain's embassy in Baghdad and take down the kingdom's flag to protest a U.S.-led meeting in Bahrain on the Israeli–Palestinian peace process.
- 26 September – The Major Criminal Court in Bahrain sentences four people to jail terms for setting up a terror group with the aim of launching attacks on police, and related crimes. Two are fugitives tried in absentia.
