= 2021 in Bahrain =

- Decades: 2000s; 2010s; 2020s
- See also: Other events of 2021; Timeline of Bahraini history

Events in the year 2021 in Bahrain.

== Incumbents ==
- Monarch: Hamad bin Isa Al Khalifa
- Prime Minister: Salman bin Hamad bin Isa Al Khalifa

== Events ==
Ongoing — COVID-19 pandemic in Bahrain

== Deaths ==
- 19 February – Faisal Abdulaziz, footballer (born 1968).
