= 2018 in Bahrain =

- Decades: 1990s; 2000s; 2010s; 2020s
- See also: Other events of 2018; Timeline of Bahraini history

Events in the year 2018 in Bahrain.

== Incumbents ==
- Monarch: Hamad ibn Isa Al Khalifa
- Prime Minister: Khalifa bin Salman Al Khalifa

== Events ==
Layout of the Bahrain International Circuit, venue for the 2018 Bahrain FIA Formula 2 round and the 2018 Bahrain Grand Prix

- 7 – 8 April – 2018 Bahrain FIA Formula 2 round.
- 8 April – 2018 Bahrain Grand Prix.

== Deaths ==
- 10 June – Hala bint D'aij Al Khalifa, royal.
