= 2014 in Bahrain =

- Decades: 1990s; 2000s; 2010s; 2020s
- See also: Other events of 2014; Timeline of Bahraini history

The following lists events that happened during 2014 in Bahrain.

== Incumbents ==
- Monarch: Hamad ibn Isa Al Khalifa
- Prime Minister: Khalifa bin Salman Al Khalifa

== Events ==
=== November ===
- November 22 - Voters in Bahrain go to the polls for the first parliamentary elections since the unsuccessful Pearl Revolution.

=== December ===
- December 20 - A bomb detonates in Bani Jamra, injuring 3 police officers.
