= 2022 in Bahrain =

- Decades: 2000s; 2010s; 2020s
- See also: Other events of 2022; Timeline of Bahraini history

Events in the year 2022 in Bahrain.

== Incumbents ==
Photo	Post	Name
	King of Bahrain	Hamad bin Isa Al Khalifa
	Prime Minister of Bahrain	Salman bin Hamad bin Isa Al Khalifa

== Events ==
Ongoing – COVID-19 pandemic in Bahrain

- 1 January – Bahrain authorizes the emergency use of Pfizer's anti-viral oral drug Paxlovid for adults over the age of 18 years.
- 12 February – Bahraini authorities confirm that an Israeli military officer will be stationed inside the country as part of an upcoming international coalition consisting of 34 countries. This is the first time an Israeli officer has been sent to a military post in the Arab World.
- 1 March – Bahrain issues an emergency approval for the vaccine candidate developed by Valneva, becoming the first country to approve the usage of the vaccine candidate.
- 28 March – The foreign ministers of Israel, Egypt, Morocco, Bahrain and the United Arab Emirates, as well as the United States Secretary of State, meet in Sde Boker, Israel, and agree to hold regular meetings about regional security and commit to further expanding economic and diplomatic cooperation.
