= 2020 in Bahrain =

- Decades: 2000s; 2010s; 2020s
- See also: Other events of 2020; Timeline of Bahraini history

Events in the year 2020 in Bahrain.

== Incumbents ==
- Monarch: Hamad ibn Isa Al Khalifa
- Prime Minister: Khalifa bin Salman Al Khalifa

== Events ==
- 21 February – The country confirmed its first COVID-19 case, a school bus driver who came from Iran via Dubai.
- 12 March – Hundreds of prisoners were ordered released in a bid to slow the spread of COVID-19.

== Deaths ==
- 11 November – Khalifa bin Salman Al Khalifa, former Prime Minister of Bahrain (b. 1935)
