= 2023 in Bahrain =

- Decades: 2000s; 2010s; 2020s
- See also: Other events of 2023; Timeline of Bahraini history

Events in the year 2023 in Bahrain.

== Incumbents ==
Photo	Post	Name
	King of Bahrain	Hamad bin Isa Al Khalifa
	Prime Minister of Bahrain	Salman bin Hamad bin Isa Al Khalifa

== Events ==
- 18 July – The National Initiative for Agricultural Development (NIAD) has completed the second phase of the "Forever Green" afforestation campaign, launched by Princess Sabika bint Ibrahim Al Khalifa, to address climate challenges and achieve zero neutrality by 2060. The campaign planted over 50,814 trees and shrubs in various projects.
- 2 August – Bahrain Beat Korea in the Opening Game of the 2023 IHF Men’s Youth World Championship.
- 25 August – Massive protests going on in Manama in solidarity with political prisoners who are on hunger strike.
- 30 August – Sherine Hussain of Bahrain sets a world sub-junior record with a remarkable deadlift of 156.5 kilograms.
- 2 September – 19-year-old Lujane Yacoub wins Miss Universe Bahrain 2023.
- 4 September – Israel establishes a new permanent embassy in Manama, however, it remains in an undisclosed location, primarily due to concerns about how Bahraini locals might react.
- 5 September
  - Trial begins for 36 year old Bahraini businessman accused of intentionally setting fire to his father's property and running away to UAE.
  - The Labour Market Regulatory Authority (LMRA) begins inspections in Manama and Northern Governorates, uncovering violations of labor and residency laws at shops and work sites.
- 6 September – The Agreement for the 'Reciprocal Promotion' and 'Protection of Investment' between Bahrain and Japan, signed in Manama on June 23, 2022, comes into effect today.
- 16 December – Bahrain National Day: The celebrations will be held 3 days later due to the Kingdom's mourning because of the Death of Emir of Kuwait, Nawaf Al-Ahmad.

=== Sports ===
- 19 September 2022 – 8 March 2023: 2022–23 Bahraini King's Cup
- 2022–23 Bahraini FA Cup
- 2022–23 Bahraini Premier League
- 2022–23 Bahraini Second Division
