= 2015 in Bahrain =

- Decades: 1990s; 2000s; 2010s; 2020s
- See also: Other events of 2015; Timeline of Bahraini history

The following lists events that happened during 2015 in Bahrain.

== Incumbents ==
- Monarch: Hamad ibn Isa Al Khalifa
- Prime Minister: Khalifa bin Salman Al Khalifa

== Events ==
=== January ===
- January 17 - The Bahraini government clashes with the protesters.
