= Independence Day (Bahrain) =

Public holiday in Bahrain commemorating independence from Britain (15 August 1971)

- Observed by: Bahrainis
- Significance: National
- Celebrations: Fireworks, concerts, parades
- Date: 15 August

Bahrain Independence Day occurred on 15 August 1971, when the country declared independence from the British following a United Nations survey of the Bahraini population. The British announced the withdrawal of their troops east of Suez in the early 1960s.

Bahrain declared its independence on 15 August 1971, marked by the signing of a friendship treaty with the British that terminated previous agreements between the two sides.

Although 15 August is the actual date on which Bahrain gained its independence from the British, the kingdom does not celebrate or mark that date. Instead, the state annually celebrates 16 December as National Day, to coincide with the day that late emir (ruler) Isa bin Salman Al Khalifa ascension to the throne. As such, 16 December is a national holiday and is usually celebrated with firework displays. The celebration is usually held at the Bahrain International Circuit.
