= 2013 in Bahrain =

- Decades: 1990s; 2000s; 2010s; 2020s
- See also: Other events of 2013; Timeline of Bahraini history

The following lists events that happened during 2013 in Bahrain.

== Incumbents ==
- Monarch: Hamad ibn Isa Al Khalifa
- Prime Minister: Khalifa bin Salman Al Khalifa

== Events ==
=== January ===
- January 11 - A fire sweeps through a complex containing housing for foreign workers in Manama leaving 13 foreign nationals dead.

=== February ===
- February 14 - Bahraini uprising (2011–present)
  - A 16-year-old is shot dead at close range in Al-Daih, a village west of Manama.
  - A police officer is also killed after rioters threw firebombs at his patrol in Sehla, a village west of Manama.
  - Amnesty International calls on the Bahraini regime to release prisoners of conscience it is holding in captivity.

=== August ===
- August 14 - Bahrain police fire tear gas to disperse protesters in response by activist for pro-democracy demonstrations.

=== October ===
- October 23 - A teenager in Bahrain dies following an explosion in the village of Bani Jamra, east of the capital Manama.
