= 1970 Bahraini independence survey =

Poll on Bahrain's sovereignty following its independence from Britain

An independence survey was held in the Persian Gulf island nation of Bahrain during 1970. The survey, sometimes referred to as a referendum, took the form of a United Nations poll on whether islanders preferred independence or Iranian control. The report of the Personal Representative of the Secretary-General on the consultation stated that "the overwhelming majority of the people of Bahrain wish to gain recognition of their identity in a full independent and sovereign State free to decide for itself its relations with other States".

As a result, the United Nations Security Council unanimously passed Resolution 278 on 11 May 1970, whilst in the same month Iran renounced its claim to the island. The country subsequently became independent from the United Kingdom in August 1971.

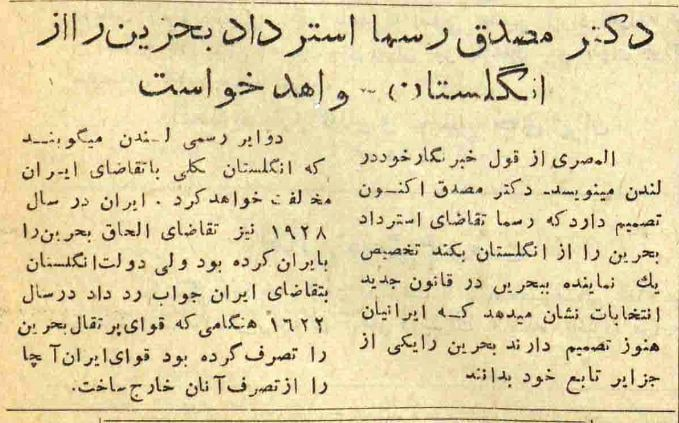
Mohammad Mosaddegh's request for the restitution of Bahrain from Britain

== United Nations involvement ==
In 1969 both the British and Iranian governments agreed to approach the United Nations Secretariat to resolve the dispute of Bahrain's sovereignty. Despite British claims that UN involvement was their initiative, evidence suggests that the Shah's desire to end territorial disputes with the British prior to their withdrawal from the Persian Gulf in 1971, was the main reason for this. In a speech in New Delhi in 1969 the Shah commented:

I want to say that if the people of Bahrain do not wish to join our country we shall never resort to force, because it is against the policy of our government to use force for capturing this part of territory... Our policy and philosophy is to oppose occupation of other territories by force.

— Mohammad Reza Pahlavi, Shah of Iran

In early 1970 the Iranian government asked the UN secretary-general to assess the will of the Bahraini people with regards to their sovereignty. UN Secretary-General U Thant accepted the task on 20 March 1970 and designated Signor Vittorio Winspeare Guicciardi, the director-general of the UN Geneva office, as his personal envoy in Bahrain during the mission. Both British and Iranian governments stated they would accept the results of the survey provided it was approved by the United Nations Security Council. The UN mission started on 30 March 1970 and lasted two weeks, resulting in the publication of UN Document Number 9772. Paragraph 57 of Signor Guicciardi's report on Bahrain stated "the results of the investigation have convinced me that the overwhelming majority of the people of Bahrain are in favour of their territory being officially recognised as an independent country of complete sovereignty, with the freedom of determining their relation with other nations". The report was distributed amongst the Security Council and the United Nations Security Council unanimously passed Resolution 278 on 11 May 1970.

The UN report and resolution were debated and accepted in both the lower and upper houses of the Iranian parliament by 14 May 1970, renouncing their claim to Bahrain. The British revoked its special agreements with Bahrain in August 1971, allowing Bahrain to subsequently declare independence. On 29 August 1971 Bahrain and Iran established diplomatic ties.
