= 2024 in Bahrain =

- Decades: 2000s; 2010s; 2020s
- See also: Other events of 2024; Timeline of Bahraini history

Events in the year 2024 in Bahrain.

== Incumbents ==
Photo	Post	Name
	King of Bahrain	Hamad bin Isa Al Khalifa
	Prime Minister of Bahrain	Salman bin Hamad bin Isa Al Khalifa

== Events ==
- 11–25 January – 2024 Asian Men's Handball Championship
- 12 June – Several people are injured and 25 shops are destroyed in a fire in Manama Souq.
- 4 September – King Hamad bin Isa Al Khalifa issues pardons to 457 prisoners on the occasion of the 25th anniversary of his accession as monarch.

== Holidays ==
- 1 January - New Year's Day
- 10–12 April – Eid al-Fitr
- 1 May - Labour Day
- 16–18 June – Eid al-Adha
- 7 July – Islamic New Year
- 16–17 July – Ashura
- 15 September – The Prophet's Birthday
- 16–17 December - National day

== Deaths ==
- 3 February – Abdullah Al-Saadawi, 76, actor, director, and playwright.
