= 2025 in Bahrain =

- Decades: 2000s; 2010s; 2020s
- See also: Other events of 2025; Timeline of Bahraini history

Events in the year 2025 in Bahrain.

== Incumbents ==
Photo	Post	Name
	King of Bahrain	Hamad bin Isa Al Khalifa
	Prime Minister of Bahrain	Salman bin Hamad bin Isa Al Khalifa

== Events ==
- March 14 – Hong Kong wins against Bahrain by 2 wickets in the Malaysia T20I Tri-Series cricket tournament
- March 17 – Bahrain wins over Hong Kong in the Malaysia T20I Tri-Series cricket tournament by 8 wickets
- 13 April – 2025 Bahrain Grand Prix and Bahrain Grand Prix
- 3 June – Bahrain is elected to a rotating seat at the United Nations Security Council for the second time.
- 17–24 June – 2025 AVC Men's Volleyball Nations Cup in Manama.
- 1 September – Clashes break out between pro-Palestine demonstrators and police in Manama following the appointment of Shmuel Revel as the new Israeli ambassador of Bahrain.
- 22–31 October – 2025 Asian Youth Games

== Holidays ==
- 1 January – New Year's Day
- 30 March –1 April – Eid al-Fitr
- 1 May – Labour Day
- 6–8 June – Eid al-Adha
- 26 June – Islamic New Year
- 5–6 July – Ashura
- 4 September – The Prophet's Birthday
- 16–17 December – National day

== Deaths ==
- 20 December – Henry Moore, 102, British-born Anglican clergyman, bishop of Cyprus and the Gulf (1981–1986)
