= Abdullah Al-Saadawi =

Bahraini actor, director, and playwright (1948–2024)

Abdullah al-Saadawi
- Born: 1948
- Died: February 3, 2024 (aged 75–76)
- Occupations: actor, director, and playwright
- Awards: Directing Award

Abdullah al-Saadawi (Arabic: عبد الله السعداوي; 1948 – 3 February 2024) was a Bahraini actor, director, and playwright.

Al-Saadawi won the Directing Award at the Cairo International Festival for Contemporary and Experimental Theatre for his production of the play الكمامة (“The Gag”). He was a founding member of several regional theatre companies, including Al-Sawari Theatre in Bahrain, the Al-Sadd Theatre in Qatar, and the Sharjah National Theatre in Sharjah, United Arab Emirates.

Al-Saadawi's debut in theatre came in the mid-1960s, when his play, الحمار ومصقلة الإعدام (“The Donkey and the Executioner”), was directed by Jamal al-Saqr with some edits by the latter as مؤلف ضاع في نفسه (“A Writer Lost in Himself”). Soon afterwards, he helped the People's Union Theatre produce its first play in his native Muharraq, a production of “Antigone”.

Al-Saadawi died on 3 February 2024, at the age of 76.

== Career ==
Theater career and filmography
Title	Type	Role in production	Theatre company	Year
مؤلف ضاع في نفسه (A Writer Lost in Himself)	Play	Writer		1964
انتيجون (Antigone)	Play	Actor	People's Union Theatre	1970
بيت ألاشباح (Ghost House)	Play	Actor	Al-Sadd Theatre	1973
خلود (Immortality)	Play	Actor	Al-Sadd Theatre	1974
علتنا فينا (Our Illness is Within Us)	Play	Actor	Al-Sadd Theatre	1974
الفريج (Al Freej)	Play	Actor	Sharjah National Theatre	1975
المشنقة (The Gallows)	Play	Director	Sharjah National Theatre	1978
خبز خبزت إكلة (Bread, I Baked a Meal)	Play	Director	Karzakan Sports Club	1986
سكوريال (Scorial)	Play	Director	Al-Sawari Theatre	1993
الكمامة (The Mask)	Play	Director	Al-Sawari Theatre	1994
الرهائن (Hostages)	Play	Director	Al-Sawari Theatre	1995
ليلة عرس رشدان (Rashdan's Wedding Night)	Play	Actor	Awal Theatre	1997
الكلمة الطيبة (The Good Word)	TV series	Actor	Bahrain TV	1997
الطفل البريء (The Innocent Child)	Play	Director	Al-Sawari Theatre	1999
مواطن طيب (Good Citizen)	Play	Director	Bahrain TV	2003
ابني المتعصب (My Fanatical Son)	Play	Director	Al-Sawari Theatre	2003
الشجرة التي سرقت اوراقها (The Tree Whose Leaves Were Stolen)	Film	Director		2004
غبار (Dust)	Film	Director		2008
أين الطريق (Where is the road?)	TV series	Actor	Qatar Television	2008
سماء ثانية (A Second Sky)	TV series	Actor	Sabah Pictures	2011
