= History of Bahrain =

Bahrain, an archipelago in the Persian Gulf, has been a pivotal center of trade, culture, and power for millennia, most notably as the heart of the ancient Dilmun civilization, a hub of commerce and diplomacy in the Bronze Age. Its strategic location attracted a succession of influential powers, including the Persians, Sumerians, Assyrians, Babylonians, Portuguese, the Arabs, and the British, each leaving a distinct mark on its cultural and political landscape. In 1932, Bahrain became the first location in the Persian Gulf outside Iran to discover oil, ushering in a transformative era of economic growth and global significance.

== Dilmun Civilization ==
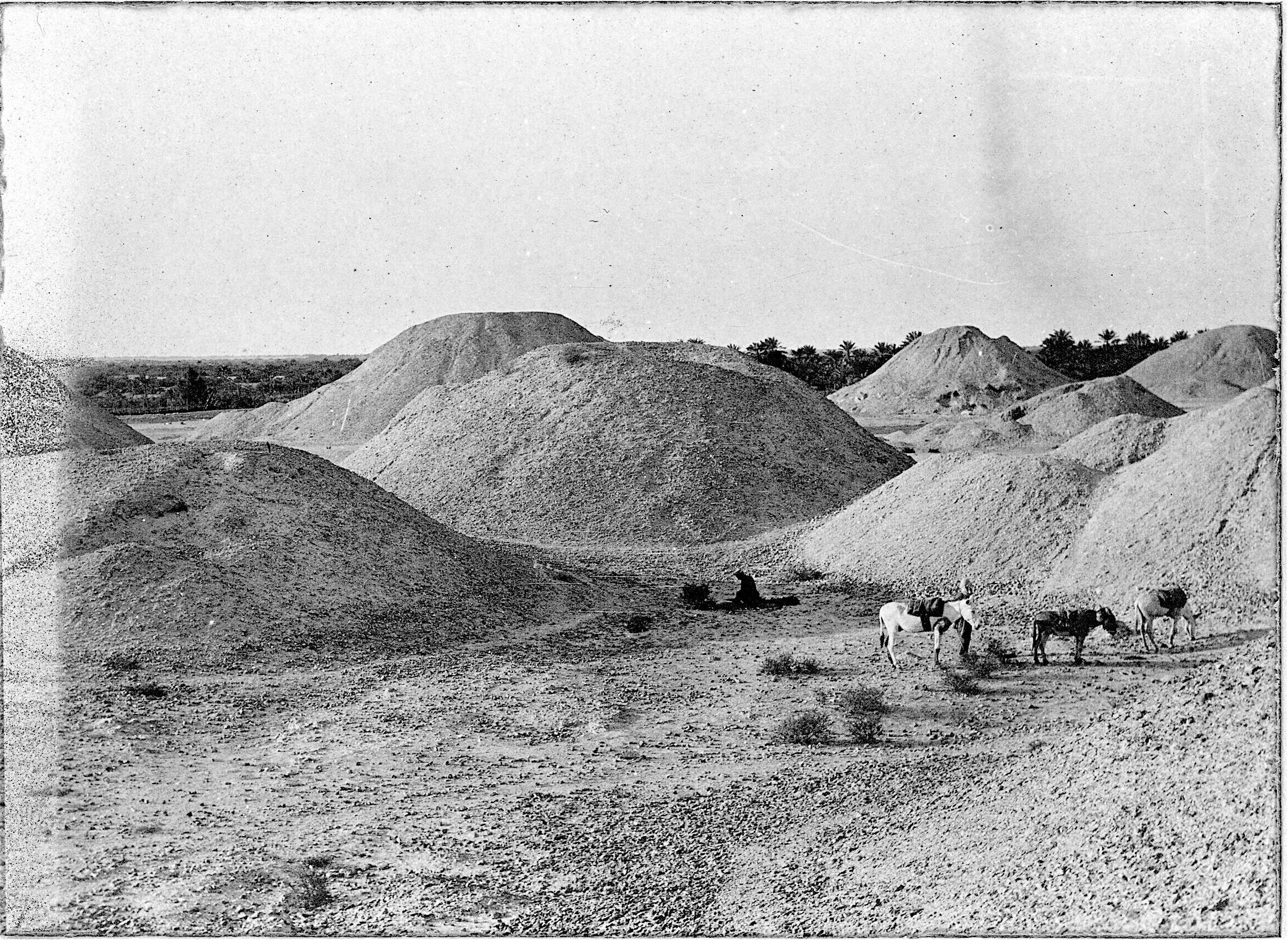
Dilmun burial mounds in 1918.

Bahrain was a central site of the ancient Dilmun civilization. Dilmun appears first in Sumerian cuneiform clay tablets dated to the end of fourth millennium BC, found in the temple of goddess Inanna, in the city of Uruk. The adjective Dilmun is used to describe a type of axe and one specific official; in addition, there are lists of rations of wool issued to people connected with Dilmun.

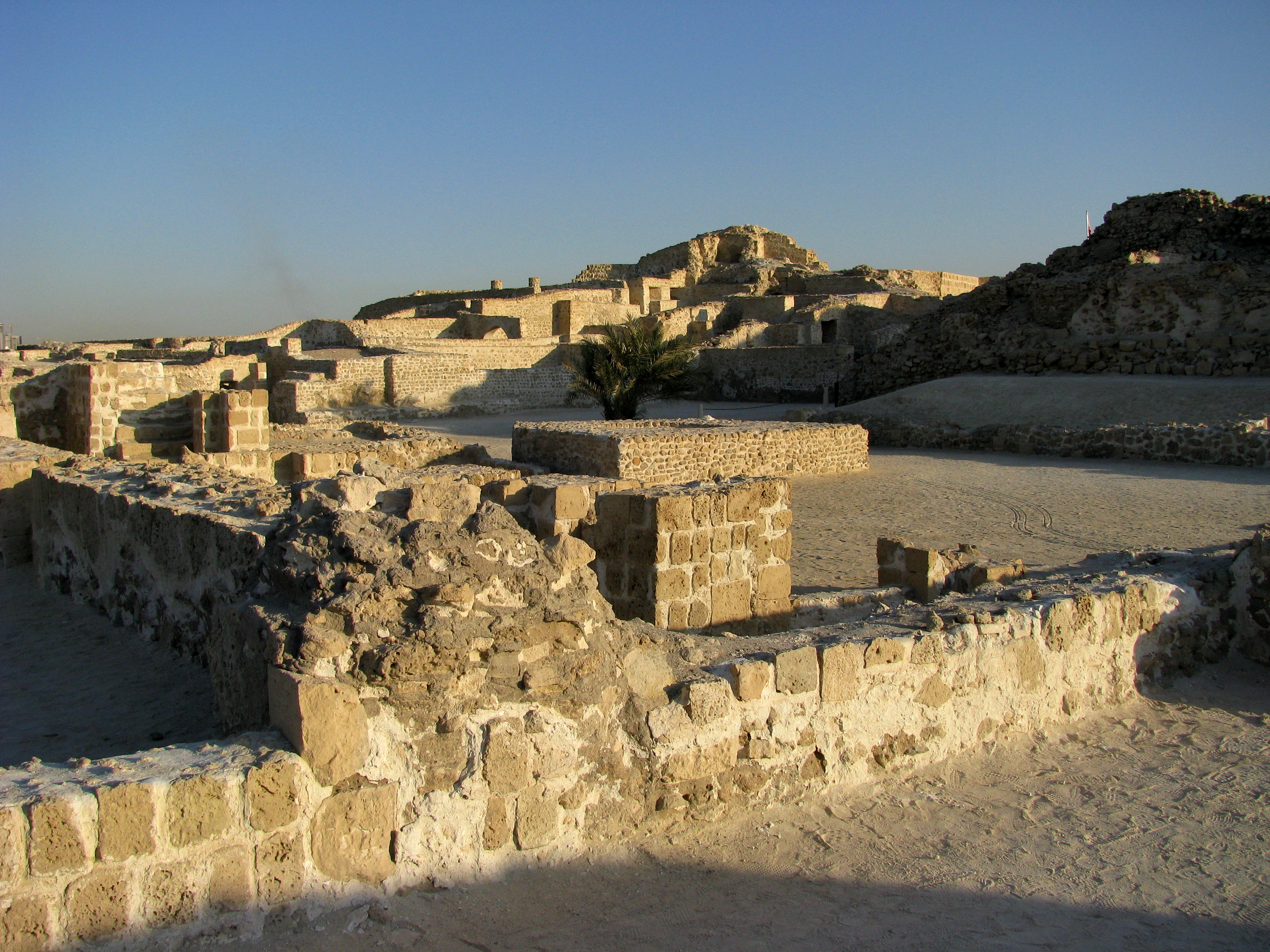
The Bahrain Fort, location of Dilmun artifacts.

Dilmun was mentioned in two letters dated to the reign of Burna-Buriash II (c. 1370 BC) recovered from Nippur, during the Kassite dynasty of Babylon. These letters were from a provincial official, Ilī-ippašra, in Dilmun to his friend Enlil-kidinni in Mesopotamia. The names referred to are Akkadian. These letters and other documents, hint at an administrative relationship between Dilmun and Babylon at that time. Following the collapse of the Kassite dynasty, Mesopotamian documents make no mention of Dilmun with the exception of Assyrian inscriptions dated to 1250 BC which proclaimed the Assyrian king to be king of Dilmun and Meluhha. Assyrian inscriptions recorded tribute from Dilmun. There are other Assyrian inscriptions during the first millennium BC indicating Assyrian sovereignty over Dilmun. Dilmun was also later on controlled by the Kassite dynasty in Mesopotamia.

One of the early sites discovered in Bahrain indicate that Sennacherib, king of Assyria (707–681 BC), attacked northeast Persian Gulf and captured Bahrain. The most recent reference to Dilmun came during the Neo-Babylonian dynasty. Neo-Babylonian administrative records, dated 567 BC, stated that Dilmun was controlled by the king of Babylon. The name of Dilmun fell from use after the collapse of Neo-Babylon in 538 BC.

There is both literary and archaeological evidence of extensive trade between Ancient Mesopotamia and the Indus Valley civilization (probably correctly identified with the land called Meluhha in Akkadian). Impressions of clay seals from the Indus Valley city of Harappa were evidently used to seal bundles of merchandise, as clay seal impressions with cord or sack marks on the reverse side testify. A number of these Indus Valley seals have turned up at Ur and other Mesopotamian sites.

Location of the Dilmun burial mounds in Bahrain.

The "Persian Gulf" types of circular, stamped (rather than rolled) seals known from Dilmun, that appear at Lothal in Gujarat, India, and Failaka, as well as in Mesopotamia, are convincing corroboration of the long-distance sea trade. What the commerce consisted of is less known: timber and precious woods, ivory, lapis lazuli, gold, and luxury goods such as carnelian and glazed stone beads, pearls from the Persian Gulf, shell and bone inlays, were among the goods sent to Mesopotamia in exchange for silver, tin, woolen textiles, olive oil and grains. Copper ingots from Oman and bitumen which occurred naturally in Mesopotamia may have been exchanged for cotton textiles and domestic fowl, major products of the Indus region that are not native to Mesopotamia. Instances of all of these trade goods have been found. The importance of this trade is shown by the fact that the weights and measures used at Dilmun were in fact identical to those used by the Indus, and were not those used in Southern Mesopotamia.

"the ships of Dilmun, from the foreign land, brought him wood as a tribute".

Mesopotamian trade documents, lists of goods, and official inscriptions mentioning Meluhha supplement Harappan seals and archaeological finds. Literary references to Meluhhan trade date from the Akkadian, the Third Dynasty of Ur, and Isin-Larsa Periods (c. 2350–1800 BC), but the trade probably started in the Early Dynastic Period (c. 2600 BC). Some Meluhhan vessels may have sailed directly to Mesopotamian ports, but by the Isin-Larsa Period, Dilmun monopolized the trade. The Bahrain National Museum assesses that its "Golden Age" lasted ca. 2200–1600 BC. Discoveries of ruins under the Persian Gulf maybe of Dilmun.]

In the Mesopotamian epic poem Epic of Gilgamesh, Gilgamesh had to pass through Mount Mashu to reach Dilmun, Mount Mashu is usually identified with the whole of the parallel Lebanon and Anti-Lebanon ranges, with the narrow gap between these mountains constituting the tunnel.

Dilmun, sometimes described as "the place where the sun rises" and "the Land of the Living", is the scene of some versions of the Eridu Genesis, and the place where the deified Sumerian hero of the flood, Utnapishtim (Ziusudra), was taken by the gods to live forever. Thorkild Jacobsen's translation of the Eridu Genesis calls it "Mount Dilmun" which he locates as a "faraway, half-mythical place".

Dilmun is also described in the epic story of Enki and Ninhursag as the site at which the Creation occurred. The promise of Enki to Ninhursag, the Earth Mother:

For Dilmun, the land of my lady's heart, I will create long waterways, rivers and canals,
whereby water will flow to quench the thirst of all beings and bring abundance to all that lives.

Ninlil, the Sumerian goddess of air and south wind had her home in Dilmun. It is also featured in the Epic of Gilgamesh.

However, in the early epic Enmerkar and the Lord of Aratta, the main events, which center on Enmerkar's construction of the ziggurats in Uruk and Eridu, are described as taking place in a world "before Dilmun had yet been settled".

== Iranian Empires ==
From the 6th century BC to the 3rd century BC Bahrain was a pivotal part of the Persian Empire of the Achaemenids, an Iranian dynasty. The Achaemenid navy set up bases along the Karun River as well as in Bahrain, Oman, and Yemen. Beyond maintaining peace along the Karun, the Persian fleet facilitated trade with India through the Persian Gulf.

From the 3rd century BC to the arrival of Islam in the 7th century AD, Bahrain was controlled by two other Iranian dynasties, the Parthians and the Sassanids. By about 130 BC, the Parthian dynasty brought the Persian Gulf under their control and extended their influence as far as Oman; since they needed to control the Persian Gulf trade route, the Parthians established garrisons along the southern coast of the Persian Gulf. Objects related to the Parthian period have been uncovered in Shahkhoura.

The Sasanian Empire at its greatest extent c. 620, under Khosrow II

In the 3rd century AD, the Sassanids succeeded the Parthians and held the area until the arrival of Islam four centuries later. Ardashir, the first ruler of the Iranian Sassanid dynasty marched to Oman and Bahrain and defeated Sanatruq (or Satiran), probably the Parthian governor of Bahrain. He appointed his son Shapur I as governor of Bahrain. Shapur constructed a new city there and named it Batan Ardashir after his father. At this time, Bahrain incorporated the southern Sassanid province covering the Persian Gulf's southern shore plus the archipelago of Bahrain. The southern province of the Sassanids was subdivided into three districts; Haggar (now al-Hafuf province, Saudi Arabia), Batan Ardashir (now al-Qatif province, Saudi Arabia), and Mishmahig (now Bahrain Island).

== Tylos ==
Bahrain was referred to by the ancient Greeks as Tylos, the centre of pearl trading, when the Greek admiral, Nearchus, first visited there. Nearchus was serving under Alexander the Great, who overthrew the ruling tribe of Al Hamar.

Nearchus is believed to have been the first of Alexander's commanders to visit Bahrain, and he found a verdant land that was part of a wide trading network. He recorded: "That in the island of Tylos, situated in the Persian Gulf, are large plantations of cotton tree, from which are manufactured clothes called sindones, with very different degrees of value, some being costly, others less expensive. The use of these is not confined to India, but extends to Arabia." The Greek historian, Theophrastus, states that many of the islands were covered in these cotton trees and that Tylos was famous for exporting walking canes engraved with emblems that were customarily carried in Babylon.

It is not known whether Bahrain was part of the Seleucid Empire, although the archaeological site at Qalat Al Bahrain has been proposed as a Seleucid base in the Persian Gulf. Alexander had planned to settle the eastern shores of the Persian Gulf with Greek colonists, and although it is not clear that this happened on the scale he envisaged, Tylos was very much part of the Hellenised world: the language of the upper classes was Greek (although Aramaic was in everyday use). Local coinage shows a seated Zeus, who may have been worshiped there as a syncretised form of the Arabian sun-god Shams. Tylos was also the site of Greek athletics contests.

Strabo, the Greek historian, geographer and philosopher mentioned that the Phoenicians came from Eastern Arabia where they have similar gods, cemeteries and temples. This theory was accepted by the 19th-century German classicist Arnold Heeren who said that: "In the Greek geographers, for instance, we read of two islands, named Tyrus or Tylos, and Arad, Bahrain, which boasted that they were the mother country of the Phoenicians, and exhibited relics of Phoenician temples". The people of Tyre, Lebanon in particular have long maintained Persian Gulf origins, and the similarity in the words "Tylos" and "Tyre" has been commented upon. Later classicist theories were proposed prior to modern archaeological excavations which revealed no disruption of Phoenician societies between 3200 B.C. and 1200 B.C.

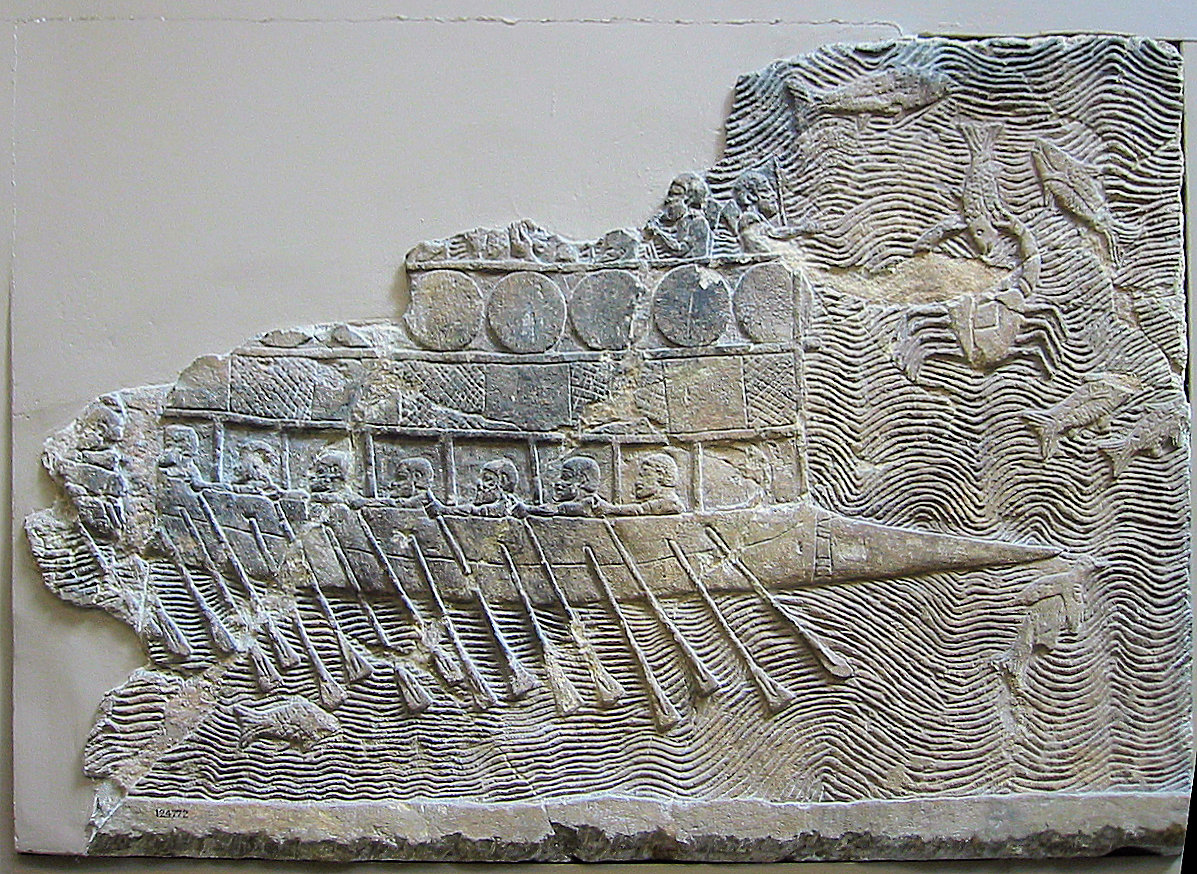
Phoenicians man their ships in service to Assyrian king Sennacherib, during his war against the Chaldeans in the Persian Gulf, ca. 700 BC

Herodotus's account (written c. 440 BC) refers to the Phoenicians originating from Eastern Arabia. (History, I:1).

According to the Persians best informed in history, the Phoenicians began the quarrel. These people, who had formerly dwelt on the shores of the Erythraean Sea (the eastern part of the Arabia peninsula), having migrated to the Mediterranean and settled in the parts which they now inhabit, began at once, they say, to adventure on long voyages, freighting their vessels with the wares of Egypt and Assyria...

— Herodotus

The name Tylos is thought to be a Hellenisation of the Semitic, Tilmun (from Dilmun). The term Tylos was commonly used for the islands until Ptolemy's Geographia when the inhabitants are referred to as 'Thilouanoi'. Some place names in Bahrain go back to the Tylos era, for instance, the residential suburb of Arad in Muharraq, is believed to originate from "Arados", the ancient Greek name for Muharraq island.

With the waning of Seleucid Greek power, Tylos was incorporated into Characene or Mesenian, the state founded in what today is Southern Iraq by Hyspaosines in 127BC. A building inscriptions found in Bahrain indicate that Hyspoasines occupied the islands, (and it also mentions his wife, Thalassia).

== Nestorian Christianity ==
From the 4th (Sasanian Empire) to the 8th century (Islamic Caliphate) the Bahraini population adopted Nestorian Christianity, also known as the "Eastern Church". Temple ruins related to that period were found in Samahij (originally referred to as "Meshmahij").

== Islamic Caliphate ==
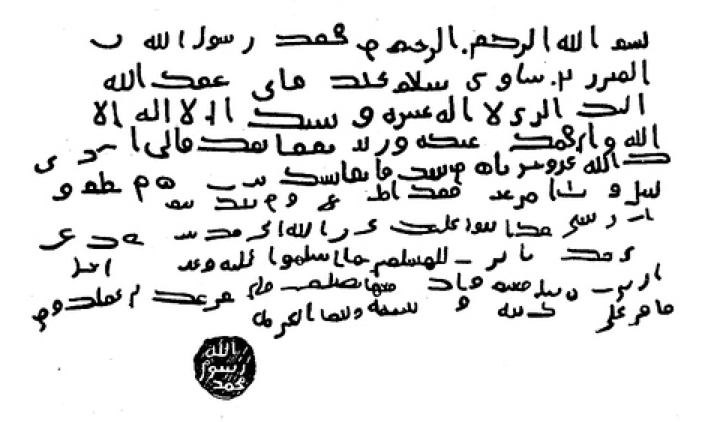
Facsimile of the letter written by Muhammed to the ruler of Bahrain.

Prior to Islam, researchers claim that Bahrain was inhabited by partially-Christianized Arabs, Aramaic-speaking agriculturalists, Persian Zoroastrians, and a small amount of Jews. According to archeological finds, Bahrain was indeed a centre of Nestorian Christianity. The Bahraini population is said to have spoken Syriac and Persian (likely Middle "Pahlavi" Persian) at the time.

Islamic narrations claim that Bahrain was majorly a Zoroastrian population, before the Arab conquest, and that Mohammed took the Jizya from them.

From the time when Islam emerged in the 7th century until the early 16th century, the name Bahrain referred to the wider historical region of Bahrain stretching from Basrah to the Strait of Hormuz along the Persian Gulf coast. This was Iqlīm al-Baḥrayn, i.e. the province of Bahrain, and the Arab inhabitants of the province were descendants of the Arab tribe Bani Abd al-Qais.

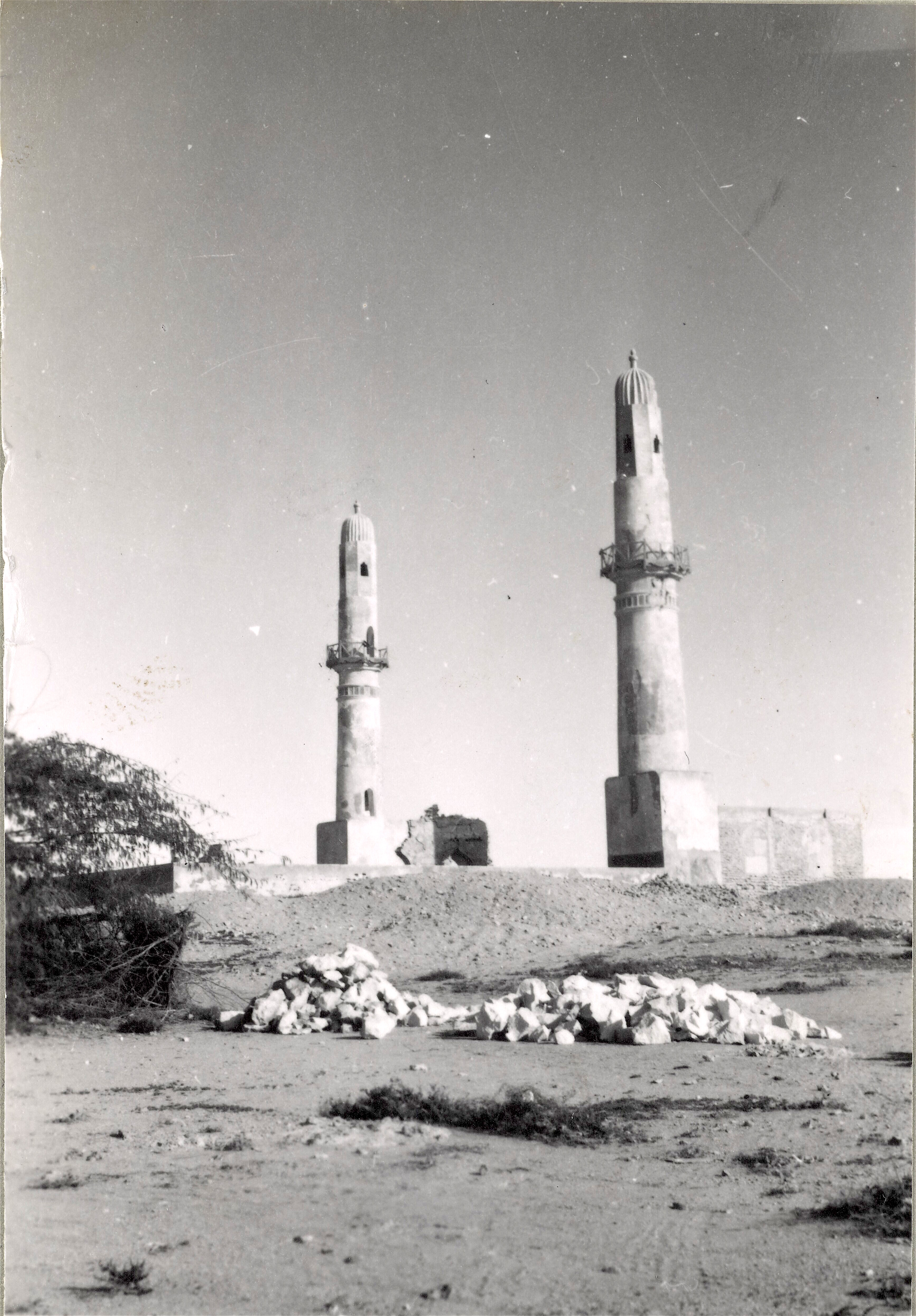
The Khamis Mosque in 1956.

Bahrain embraced Islam in 629 (the seventh year of hijra); Mohammed ruled Bahrain through one of his representatives, Al-Ala'a Al-Hadhrami. During the time of Umar I the famous companion of the Prophet, Abu Hurayrah, was the governor of Bahrain. Umar I also appointed Uthman bin Abi Al Aas as governor of the area. Al Khamis Mosque, founded in 692, was one of the earliest mosques built in Bahrain, in the era of Umayyad caliph Umar II.

The expansion of Islam did not affect Bahrain's reliance on trade, and its prosperity continued to be dependent on markets in Mesopotamia. After Baghdad emerged as the seat of the caliph in 750 and the main centre of Islamic civilization, Bahrain greatly benefited from the city's increased demand for foreign goods especially from China and South Asia. Bahrain became a hub for intellectuals for hundreds of years stretching from the early days of Islam in the 6th century to the 18th century. Philosophers of Bahrain were highly esteemed, such as the 13th century mystic, Sheikh Maitham Al Bahrani (died in 1299).

== The Qarmatian Republic ==
Around the year 900, Abu Sa'id al-Hasan al-Jannabi led the Qarmatian revolution, a rebellion by a messianic Ismaili sect originating in Kufa in present-day Iraq. Al-Jannabi took over the city of Hajr, Bahrain's capital at that time, and al-Hasa, which he made the capital of his republic. Once in control of the state he sought to create a utopian society.

The Qarmatians' goal was to build a society based on reason and equality. The state was governed by a council of six with a chief who was a first among equals. All property within the community was distributed evenly among all initiates. The Qarmatians were organized as an esoteric society but not as a secret one; their activities were public and openly propagated, but new members had to undergo an initiation ceremony involving seven stages. The Qarmatian world view was one where every phenomenon repeated itself in cycles, where every incident was replayed over and over again.

Even before taking over Bahrain, the Qarmatians had instigated what some scholars have termed a 'century of terrorism' in Kufa. From Bahrain they launched raids along the pilgrim routes crossing Arabia: in 906 they ambushed the pilgrim caravan returning from Mecca and massacred 20,000 pilgrims. Under Abu Tahir al-Jannabi they came close to capturing Baghdad in 923, and sacked Mecca in 930. In the assault on Islam's holiest sites, the Qarmatians desecrated the Well of Zamzam with corpses of Hajj pilgrims, and took the Black Stone from Mecca to al-Hasa. According to historian al-Juwayni, the stone was returned 22 years later in 951 under mysterious circumstances. Wrapped in a sack, it was thrown into the Great Mosque of Kufa in Iraq, accompanied by a note saying "By command we took it, and by command we have brought it back." The theft and removal of the Black Stone caused it to break into seven pieces.

The sack of Mecca followed millenarian excitement among the Qarmatians (and in Persia) over the conjunction of Saturn and Jupiter in 928. Bahrain became the seat of the Qarmatian Mahdi-Caliph from Isfahan who abolished Sharīa law. The new Mahdi also changed the qibla of prayer from Mecca to that of fire, a specifically Zoroastrian practice. Some scholars take the view that "they may not have been Isamailis at all at the outset, and their conduct and customs gave plausibility to the belief that they were not merely heretics but bitter enemies of Islam."

For much of the 10th century the Qarmatians were the most powerful force in the Persian Gulf and Middle East, controlling the coast of Oman, and collecting tribute from the Abbasid caliph in Baghdad and from the rival Ismaili Fatimid caliph in Cairo, whom they did not recognize. The land they ruled over was extremely wealthy with a huge slave-based economy according to academic Yitzhak Nakash:

The Qarmatian state had vast fruit and grain estates both on the islands and in Hasa and Qatif. Nasiri Khusru, who visited Hasa in 1051, recounted that these estates were cultivated by some thirty thousand Ethiopian slaves. He mentions that the people of Hasa were exempt from taxes. Those impoverished or in debt could obtain a loan until they put their affairs in order. No interest was taken on loans, and token lead money was used for all local transactions. The Qarmatian state had a powerful and long-lasting legacy. This is evidenced by a coin known as Tawila, minted around 920 by one of the Qarmatian rulers, and which was still in circulation in Hasa early in the 20th century

The Qarmatians were defeated in battle in 976 by the Abbasids, which encouraged them to look inward to build their utilitarian society. Around 1058, a revolt on the island of Bahrain led by two Shi'a members of the Abd al-Qays tribe, Abul-Bahlul al-'Awwam and Abu'l-Walid Muslim, precipitated the waning of Qarmatian power and eventually the ascendancy to power of the Uyunids, an Arab dynasty belonging to the Abdul Qays tribe.

== Uyunid dynasty ==
In 1076–1077, Sheikh Abdullah bin Ali Al Uyuni seized the country from the Qarmatians in Bahrain and Al-Hasa with the military assistance of Great Seljuq Empire and founded the Uyunid dynasty and established the Uyunid Emirate. The Uyunid dynasty, ruled Bahrain for 163 years, from the 11th to the 13th centuries. Their sect is disputed; some sources mention they were Shia, others Sunni. They were the remnants of Bani Abdul Qays tribe. The state of Al-Hasa was the first capital of the Uyunid Emirate. Then Al-Fadhl, son of Abdullah, transfers his capital to Qatif, then to Awal (today's state of Bahrain). In his reign, the state extended to Kuwait. Then in 513 H. the Capital went back to Qatif. Then in 531 H. Mohammed son of Al Fadhl 1 is assassinated there for the state was divided into two, one in Al-Hasa and the other in Al-Qatif.

Under Muhammad b. Ahmad b. Abu'l-Hussin b. Abu Sinan, the Uyunid's territory stretched from Najd to the Syrian desert. Due to the influence of the Uyunid kingdom, Caliph al-Nasir li-Din Allah gave Muhammad b. Ahmad authority to protect the pilgrimage route to Mecca. Muhammad was later murdered by a family member, instigated by his cousin, Gharir b. Shukr b. Ali. In the years 587 – 605 H. Mohammed bin Abi Al-hussain unites Qatif and Al-Hasa. The country was ruled by the Uyunid dynasty for 163 years. In 1253 C. Conflicts inside the Uyunid family gave the chance to the Bedouin Usfurids of Banu Uqayl to establish their state and destroy the Uyunid State. Thereby gaining control over eastern Arabia, including the islands of Bahrain. The famous poet Ali bin al Mugrab Al Uyuni is a descendant of the Uyunids.

== Usfurid, and Jabrid dynasties ==
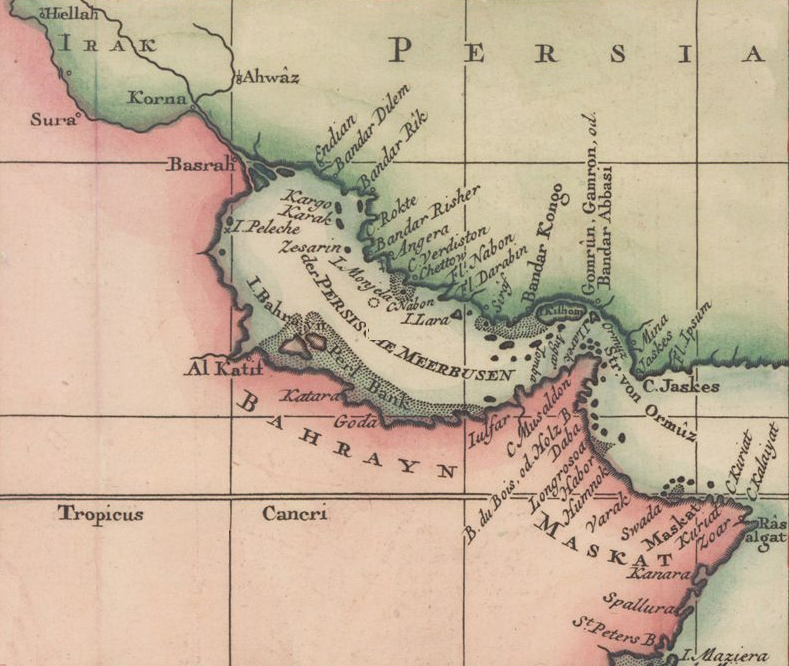
The historical region of Bahrain on a 1745 Bellin map

In 1253, the Bahrani dynasty of the Usfurids of Banu Uqayl – named after its founder, Usfur ibn Rashid – gained control over eastern Arabia, including the islands of Bahrain. The late Middle Ages were a time of chronic instability with local disputes allowing various Persian-based Arab Kingdoms based in Qais, Qishm and Hormuz to involve themselves in Bahrain's affairs. In 1330, the islands became tributary to the rulers of Hormuz.

According to historian Juan Cole it was under Shia rule that Twelver Shi'ism became established in Bahrain, as Shia Bahrainis gradually moved away from the radical, egalitarian Ismaili Qarmatian sect to the more quietist Twelver or Imami branch, a process which the Sunni rulers encouraged. But even in the 14th century, the North African traveller Ibn Battuta visiting Qatif around 1331, found it inhabited by Arabs whom he described as "extremist Shi'is" (rafidiyya ghulat), which Cole presumes is how a 14th-century Sunni would describe Ismailis. Ibn Battuta also noted the great wealth of the area thanks to the pearling industry.

Until the late Middle Ages, "Bahrain" referred to the larger historical region of Bahrain. Ibn Battuta's 14th-century account contains an early use of the term "Bahrain" to refer solely to the Awal islands. However, the exact date at which the term "Bahrain" began to refer solely to the Awal archipelago is unknown.

In the mid-15th century, another branch of the Banu Uqayl, led by Zamil ibn Jabir, wrested control of Bahrain, founding the dynasty of the Bedouin Jabrids. Based in al-Ahsa, the Jabrids ruled most of eastern Arabia and followed the Shia Twelver rite, which they actively promoted within their domain.

== Portuguese rule ==
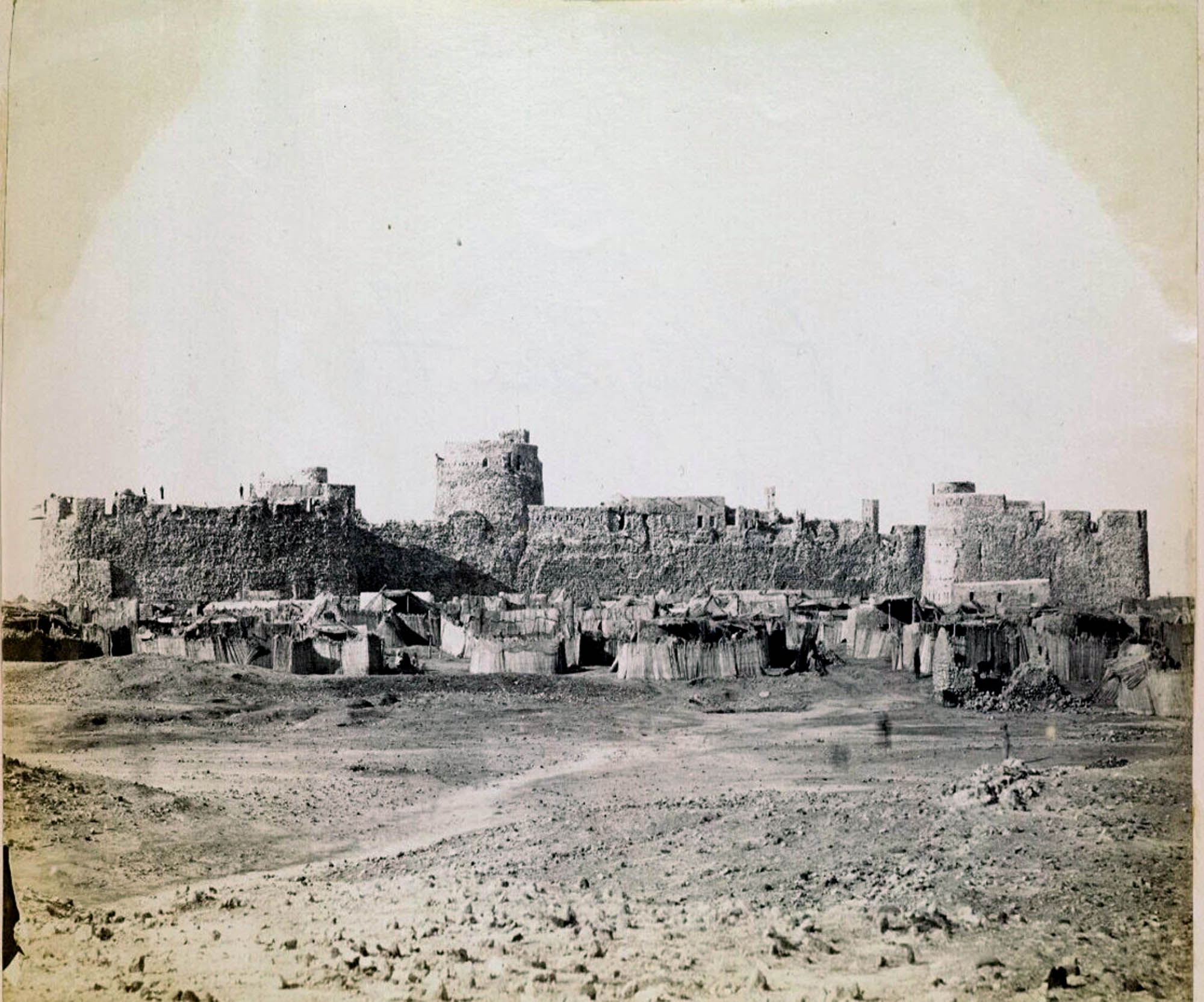
The Portuguese Fort in 1870.

The Arab navigator, Ahmad Bin Majid, visited Bahrain in 1489 prior to the Portuguese' arrival in the region and gave an account of the country: "In Awal (Bahrain) there are 360 villages and fresh water can be found in a number of places. A most wonderful al-Qasasir, where a man can dive into the salt sea with a skin and can fill it with fresh water while he is submerged in the salt water. Around Bahrain are pearl fisheries and a number of islands all of which have pearl fisheries and connected with this trade are 1,000 ships" (Majid, Arab Navigation in the Indian Ocean before the Coming of the Portuguese. Trans. G.R. Tibbetts. The Royal Asisatic Society of Great Britain and Ireland, 1981.)

Portuguese expansion into the Indian Ocean in the early 16th century followed Vasco da Gama's voyages of exploration in which the Portuguese battled the Ottomans up the coast of the Persian Gulf. The Portuguese, drawn in by the lucrative trade routes of the Gulf, sought control of the strategic Ormus region before setting its sights on Bahrain. Portuguese ships first entered the Gulf in 1485, the first reputed Portuguese traveller to visit Bahrain was Duarte Barbosa. After the Kingdom of Hormuz fell in 1507, Hormuz' political control of Bahrain was lost after the island fell to the princes of Al-Hasa. A combined Portuguese-Hormuz force led by António Correia conquered Bahrain in 1521, only to briefly lose it to the princes of Al-Hasa the same year. In response, the Portuguese sent another expedition to Bahrain and the Arabian coast and subdued the Al-Hasa attempts to regain power – making Bahrain the first country in the Middle East to be fully colonised by a European power.

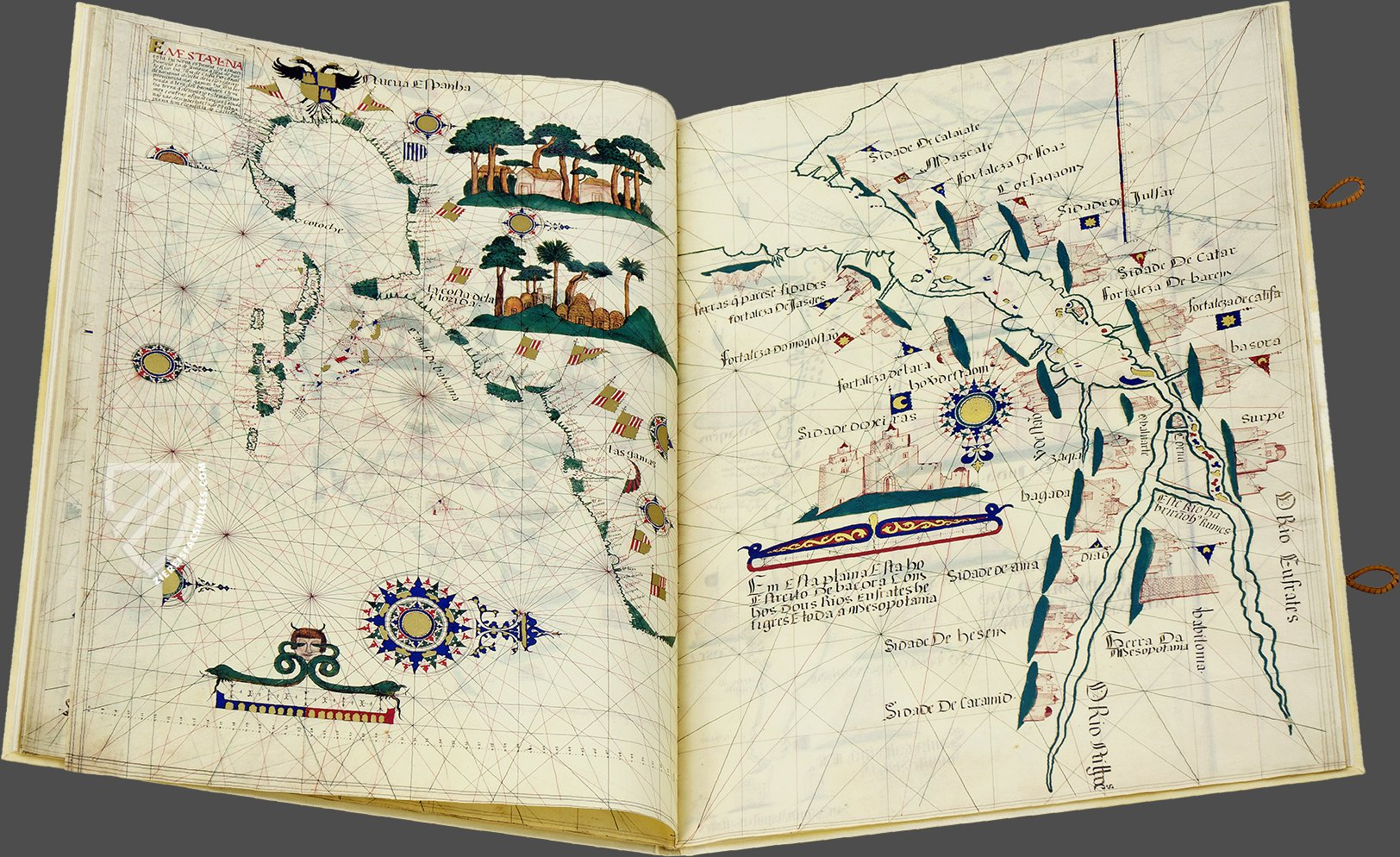
Sidade de Baren depicted in Lázaro Luís' 1563 map of Arabia

The Portuguese later consolidated their position of the island by reconstructing the Qal'at al Bahrain fortress, which was to serve as the base for the Portuguese garrison. It is believed that the Portuguese ruled the islands via indirect rule, with some force, against the inhabitants for eighty years, despite incurring several revolts and protests (one of which resulted in temporary independence in 1534). Such a revolt was the rebellion of 1529 saw the deployment of a 400-man Portuguese force sent to subdue the island.

Except for a brief period in 1559 when the governor of the Ottoman province of Al-Hasa tried to occupy the islands but were repelled, the Portuguese remained in control until they were driven out of the island in 1602, when a popular uprising led by Rukn ed-Din took control of the Bahrain Fort. The uprising was sparked by the governor's order of the execution of the island's richest traders. Portuguese attempts to retake Bahrain were thwarted due to aid from the prince of Shiraz. The uprising coincided with regional disputes between the Portuguese and rival European powers. The power vacuum that resulted was almost immediately filled by the Persian ruler, Shah Abbas I, who deployed a Persian garrison to the Bahrain Fort and subsumed it within the Safavid Empire.

== Persian Safavid hegemony and Omani invasion ==
Under Persian Safavid rule (1602–1717), Bahrain fell under the administrative jurisdiction of the Beglarbegi of Kuhgilu centered at Behbahan in southern Iran. In fact, the Safavids ruled Bahrain from a distance, seeking to control the islands not by force, but through ideology and the manipulation of local rivalries. Safavid rule was a period of intellectual flowering among the Shia theological elite, with Bahrain's seminaries producing such theorists as Sheikh Yusuf Al Bahrani. The Safavid's used the clergy to buttress their rule, hoping that by firmly implanting Imami Shi'ism they could secure the islands of Bahrain, with their centrality to trade routes and pearl wealth.

However, the Safavids' strategy was in many ways too successful: the power and influence of the religious class meant that they had a great deal of autonomy, and it was the subsequent tension between Safavid state and the clergy that drove Bahrain's theological vitality. Part of this flourishing was borne of the Bahraini clerics' adherence to conservative Akhbari Shi'ism, while the Safavids encouraged the more state-centric, Usulism. Attempts by the Persians to reign in the Bahraini ulema were often counterproductive, and ended up strengthening the clerics against their local land-owning Bahraini rivals who challenged the clerics' control over the lucrative pearl trade. Cleric-landowner conflict was usually contained within very limited parameters given that the senior ulema were usually the sons of the land-owning class.

=== Omani invasion and subsequent instability ===
An Afghan invasion of Iran at the beginning of the 18th century resulted in the near collapse of the Safavid state. In the resultant power vacuum, Oman invaded Bahrain in 1717, ending over a hundred years of Persian hegemony. The Omani invasion began a period of political instability and a quick succession of outside rulers took power with consequent destruction. According to a contemporary account by theologian, Sheikh Yusuf Al Bahrani, in an unsuccessful attempt by the Persians and their Bedouin allies to take back Bahrain from the Kharijite Omanis, much of the country was burnt to the ground. Bahrain was eventually sold back to the Persians by the Omanis, but the weakness of the Safavid empire saw Huwala tribes seize control.

In 1730, the new Shah of Persia, Nader Shah, sought to re-assert Persian sovereignty in Bahrain. He ordered Latif Khan, the admiral of the Persian navy in the Persian Gulf, to prepare an invasion fleet in Bushehr. The Persians invaded in March or early April 1736 when the ruler of Bahrain, Shaikh Jubayr, was away on hajj. The invasion brought the island back under central rule and to challenge Oman in the Persian Gulf. He sought help from the British and Dutch, and he eventually recaptured Bahrain in 1736. In 1753, Bahrain was occupied by the Arabs of Abu Shahr of the Bushire-based Al Madhkur family, who ruled Bahrain in the name of Persia and paid allegiance to Karim Khan Zand. During the Qajar era, Persian control over Bahrain waned.

The years of almost constant warfare and instability in the period led to a demographic collapse – German geographer Carsten Niebuhr found in 1763 that Bahrain's 360 towns and villages had, through warfare and economic distress, been reduced to only 60. The influence of Iran was further undermined at the end of the 18th century when the ideological power struggle between the Akhbari-Usuli strands culminated in victory for the Usulis in Bahrain.

== Invasion and British Protectorate (1783–1971) ==
=== The Bahrain invasions ===
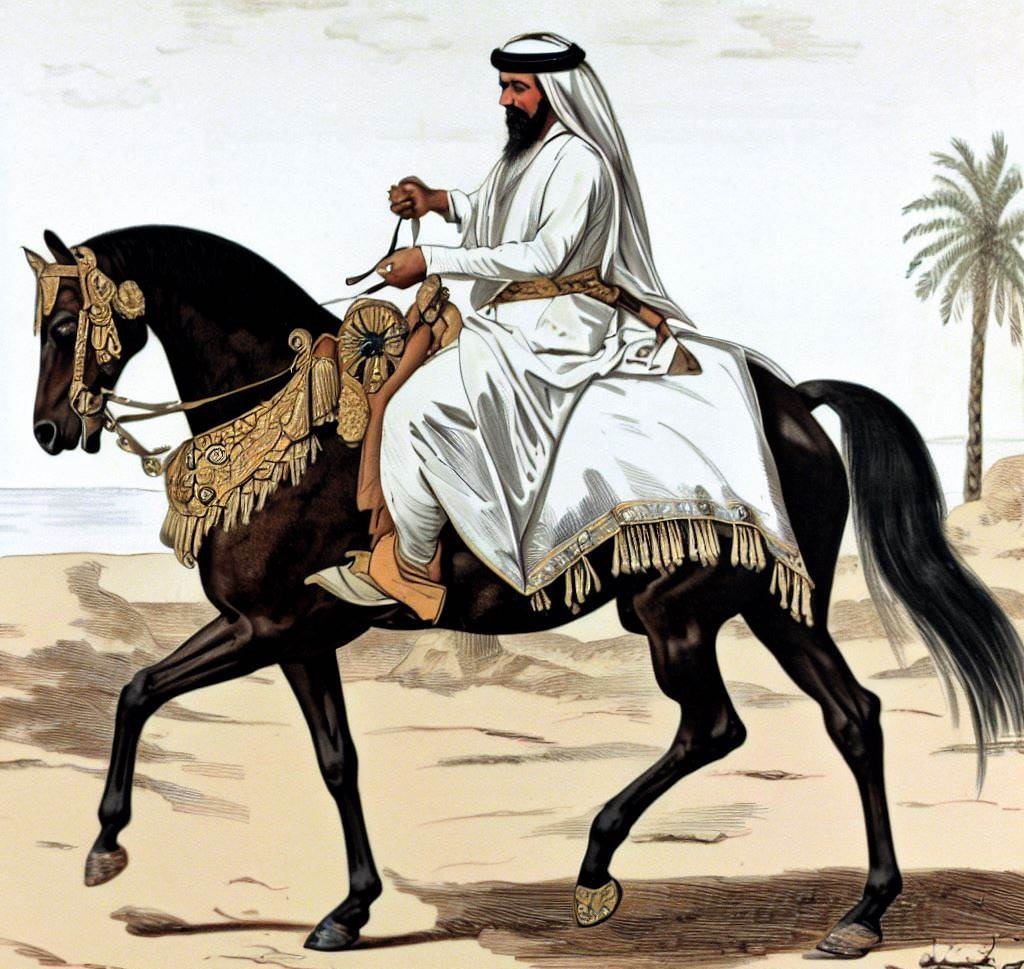
Artistic depiction of Nasr Al-Madhkur in Bushehr

In 1782, war broke out between the army of Sheikh Nasr Al-Madhkur, the ruler of Bahrain and Bushehr and the Zubarah-based Bani Utbah clan, though hostilities arose since 1777 after the Persians saw the Zubarah base as a threat. The prosperity of Zubarah, which is in modern Qatar, had brought it to the attention of the two main powers at the time, Persia and Oman, which were presumably sympathetic to Sheikh Nasr's ambitions. At the same time, Bahrain offered great potential wealth because of the extensive pearls found in its waters.

Nasr enlisted the aid of the rulers of Bandar Rig, Bandar Ganaveh and Dashtestan and amassed an army of 2,000 soldiers to be commanded by his nephew, Mohammed. The Persians launched an assault of Zubarah's fort but were forced to break the siege after suffering stiff resistance from the Al Khalifa defenders and facing imminent naval reinforcements from Bani Utbah men in Kuwait. In retaliation to the assault, the Bani Utbah clan launched an invasion of Bahrain Island in 1783. Historians disagree on who attacked first; some historians believe that the incoming naval reinforcements from Kuwait intercepted a message from Nasr Al-Madhkur to his representative in Bahrain stating that the Persians had lost the battle. Upon learning this, the fleet switched course and invaded Bahrain, capturing the Bahrain fort and surrounding the Persian garrison. With a large coalition of tribesmen from the Bani Utbah and interior Arabia, the invasion of Bahrain was completed on 28 July 1783 Other historians believe that the Kuwaitis invaded Bahrain because they were closer to it than to Zubarah and as such, would deliver a tactical defeat to the Persians and would later handover possession to the Bani Utbah clan. The most probable version, as put forward by Historian J. G. Lorimer, was that the invasion was led by Ahmed Al Fateh in 1783 and that he defeated Nasr Al-Madhkur in battle on the outskirts of Manama and plundered the town.Historians dispute the date of the invasion, some stating it occurred in 1782 while others say it was 1783. Ahmed al-Fateh ruled Bahrain and Zubarah, visiting the former in the summer and the latter in the winter, until his death in 1796.

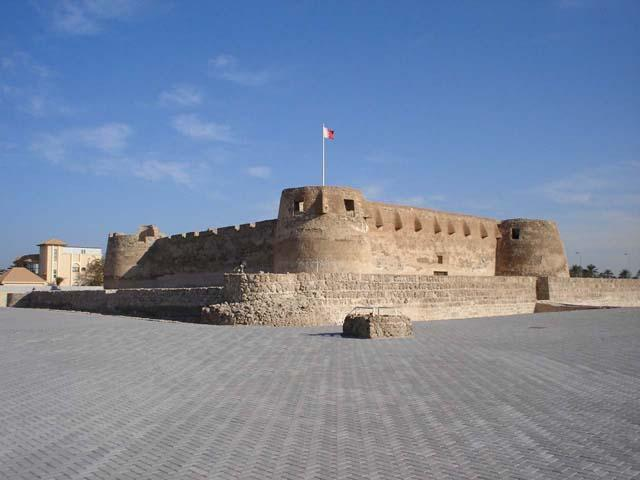
A view of Arad Fort

In 1797, fourteen years after gaining the power of the Bani Utbah, the Al Khalifa family moved to Bahrain and settled in Jaww, later moving to Riffa. They were originally from Kuwait, having left in 1766. Al-Sabah family traditions relate that the ancestors of their family and those of the Al-Khalifa family came to Kuwait after their expulsion from the Iraqi Umm Qasr town upon Khor Zubair by the Turks, an earlier base from which they preyed on the caravans of Basra and pirated ships in the Shatt al-Arab waterway. The first ruler of the Al Khalifa was Shaikh Ahmed Al-Fateh.

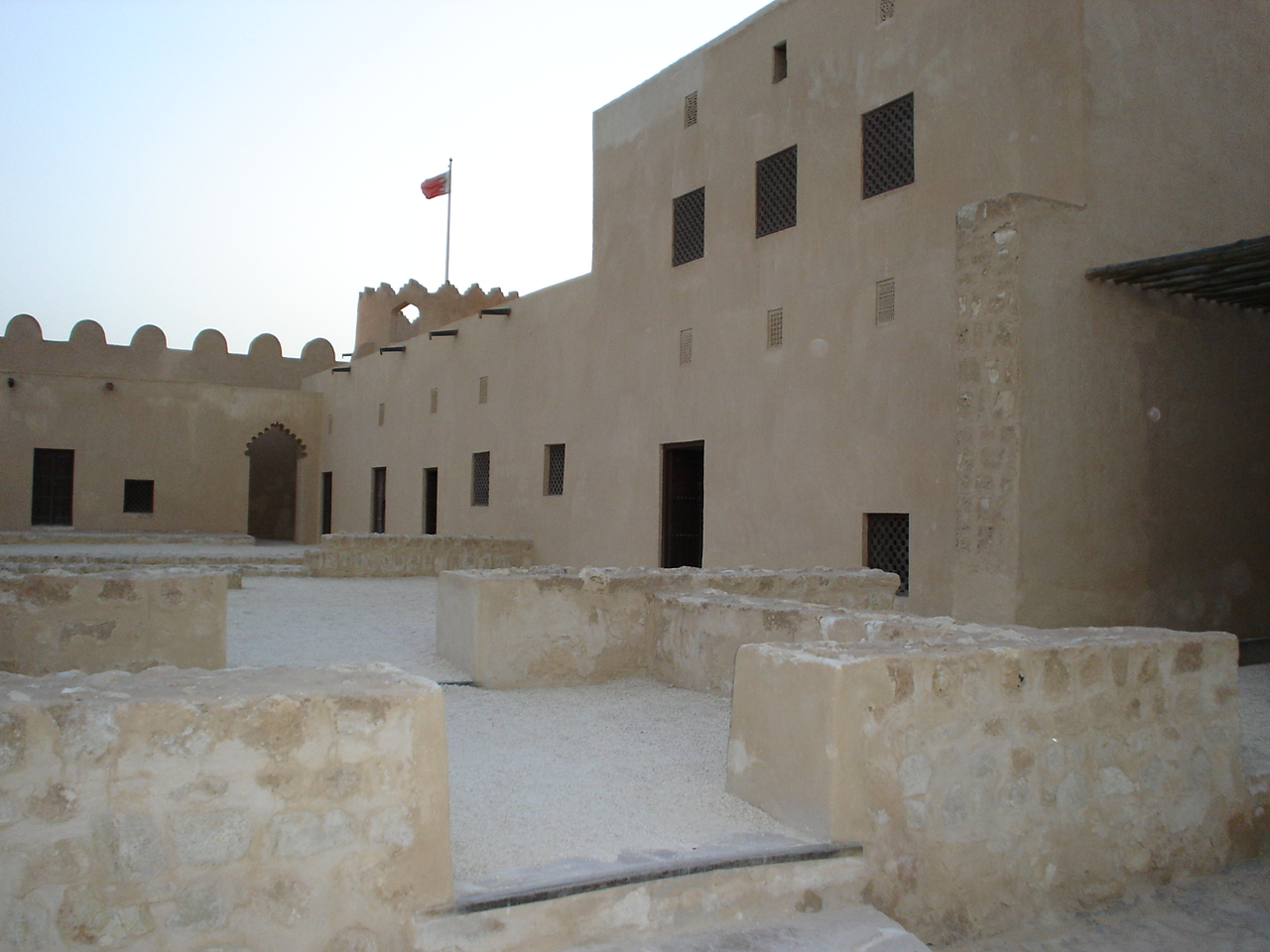
Inside Riffa Fort

Persian attempts to reconquer the island in 1783 and in 1785 failed; the 1783 expedition was a joint Persian-Qawasim invasion force that never left Bushehr. The 1785 invasion fleet, composed of forces from Bushehr, Rig and Shiraz was called off after the death of the ruler of Shiraz, Ali Murad Khan. Due to internal difficulties, the Persians could not attempt another invasion. In 1799, Bahrain came under threat from the expansionist policies of Sayyid Sultan, the Sultan of Oman, when he invaded the island under the pretext that Bahrain did not pay owed taxes. The Bani Utbah solicited the aid of Bushire to expel the Omanis on the condition that Bahrain would become a tributary state of Persia. In 1800, Sayyid Sultan invaded Bahrain again in retaliation and deployed a garrison at Arad Fort, in Muharraq island and had appointed his twelve-year-old son Salim, as Governor of the island. The Bani Utbah laid siege to Arad Fort later that year, ejecting Salim from power. In 1802, the Sayyid Sultan once again sailed with a fleet to Bahrain, however, the Al Khalifa enlisted the aid of Wahhabis from the mainland which forced the Omanis to abort their invasion.

=== Treaties with Britain ===
In 1820, the Al Khalifa tribe regained power in Bahrain and entered a treaty relationship with Great Britain, by then the dominant military power in the Persian Gulf. This treaty recognised the Al Khalifa as the rulers ("Al-Hakim" in Arabic) of Bahrain. It was the first of several treaties including the 1861 Perpetual Truce of Peace and Friendship, which was further revised in 1892 and 1951.

This treaty was similar to those entered into by the British Government with the other Persian Gulf principalities. It specified that the ruler could not dispose of any of his territory except to the United Kingdom and could not enter into relationships with any foreign government without British consent. In return the British promised to protect Bahrain from all aggression by sea and to lend support in case of land attack. More importantly, the British promised to support the rule of the Al Khalifa in Bahrain, securing its unstable position as rulers of the country. According to School of Oriental and African Studies academic, Nelida Fuccaro, this treaty relationship with Britain was one aspect of an evolving polity:

From this perspective state building under the Al Khalifa shayks should not be considered exclusively as the result of Britain's informal empire in the Persian Gulf. In fact, it was a long process of strategic negotiation with different sections of the local population in order to establish a pre-eminence of their particularly artistic Sunni/Bedouin tradition of family rule.

After the Egyptian ruler, Mohammad Ali Pasha took the Arabian Peninsula from the Wahhabis on behalf of the Ottoman Empire in 1830, the Egyptian army demanded yearly tributes from Sheikh Abdul Al Khalifa. He had earlier sought Persian and British protection from the Egyptians. The Sheikh agreed to the terms of the Egyptians.

In April 1843 Muhammad bin Khalifa Al Khalifa defeated Abdullah bin Ahmad Al Khalifa becoming the ruler. Among his first steps taken as ruler was to appoint his brother, Ali bin Khalifa, as chief of Al Bidda, Qatar that year, thereby delegating all mainland affairs and solidifying Qatar's status as a Bahraini suzerainty.

During his reign Muhammad paid an annual tribute to Faisal bin Turki, successor of Abdullah bin Thunayan as the Emir of Najd. After eliminating his rival Abdullah bin Thunayan, Faisal bin Turki consolidated his power by subduing opposition tribes in Najd and taking control of key economic centres such as Al-Ahsa and Saihat. However, Faisal's ambitions extended beyond these territories. In 1847, he attempted to intervene in Bahrain, exploiting internal conflicts within the ruling family. Although unsuccessful in capturing Bahrain, he settled for a peace agreement that included a tribute payment. Faisal's inability to seize Bahrain was, in part, due to the firm stance of the British government against Saudi expansion in the Persian Gulf. The British, who had substantial interests in the region, closely monitored Faisal's movements. Their support for Muhammad bin Khalifa and their strategic positions in the Gulf influenced the broader regional dynamics.

However, in 1850, Muhammad began not to pay the tribute, and next year he attempted to get support from the Ottomans, but his attempt was not fruitful. In May 1851, Faisal launched his third attempt to capture Bahrain, ordering his forces to proceed towards Al Bidda, Qatar, which was intended to be used as a staging area for an invasion of Bahrain, preparing for a confrontation with Muhammad bin Khalifa. In response, Ali bin Khalifa, the Bahraini representative in Qatar, called on all men of fighting age to defend Al Bidda, as well as sending for help from Saeed bin Tahnun Al Nahyan of Abu Dhabi. This culminated in the Battle of Mesaimeer, taking place from 2–4 June 1851. Although the resistance was initially successful in repelling the invasion, Ali bin Khalifa's forces later retreated to their ships. Shortly after the fighting had taken place, Mohammed bin Thani, an influential tribal leader in Al Bidda, pursued a separate peace agreement with Faisal and agreed to his governance, a move seen as a betrayal by the Bahrainis. Upon receiving news of this, Muhammad bin Khalifa ordered a naval blockade of Al Bidda in June 1851. He also sent Hamad bin Mohammed Al Khalifa to inform British political resident Samuel Hennell of his concerns of a joint Wahhabi-Qatari invasion of Bahrain and requested protection, stating that he was willing to be a British subject in exchange for such protection. The British originally rejected this proposition.

Upon further analysis of the situation, Justin Sheil, a high-ranking British diplomat in Persia, concluded that Faisal bin Turki's control of the Qatari Peninsula would be detrimental to British interests as it would provide the Ottoman Empire with an opportunity to incorporate Bahrain under its aegis in the event of a joint Qatari-Wahhabi invasion of the island. Thus, on 1 July, Hennel directed multiple British warships to be sent to protect Manama Harbor in Bahrain. He then separately wrote letters to Faisal bin Turki and Mohammed bin Thani, warning them against launching a naval invasion of the Bahraini coast. The conflict pacified when, facing pressure from multiple sides and fearing further erosion of Bahraini influence, Muhammad bin Khalifa agreed to a peace settlement. This agreement, brokered by Saeed bin Tahnun of Abu Dhabi on 25 July 1851, required Bahrain to pay an annual sum of 4,000 German krones to Faisal bin Turki as zakat. In return, Faisal agreed to restore the fort of Al Bidda to Bahraini control and to cease interference in Qatar.

The Al Khalifa administration functioned through a hierarchical system of patronage, where tribal allies received preferential treatment. In exchange for their loyalty and defense when needed, these tribes were granted autonomy and tax-free access to Bahrain's valuable pearl banks. By 1860, the Al Khalifa sought protection from the British, the dominant power in the Persian Gulf, establishing a protector-protégé relationship with them.

The Government of Al Khalifa once again sought the protection of a larger power when the British tried to overpower Bahrain. Sheikh Mohammad bin Khalifa Al Khalifa wrote letters to both the Persian Prince-Governor of Fars and to the Ottoman Wali of Baghdad, to place Bahrain in the protection of each respective state. Both sides sent wakils (a person who is an authorised representative), who offered the Sheikh their conditions, of which the Ottoman terms were more beneficial and was accepted in March 1860. In another letter to the Iranian Foreign Minister, Sheikh Mohammad demanded that the Government of Iran provide direct guidance and protection from British pressure.

Like other Gulf Arab sheikhdoms, Bahrain developed as a center for pearl diving and commerce, ruled by a Sunni Arab sheikhly family of Bedouin origin. Despite waves of migration that brought a diverse mix of merchants, financiers, craftsmen, and laborers from across the Persian Gulf and Indian Ocean, the Shi'i Baharna remained the majority population. Since the mid-19th century, a small Shi'i community known as the 'Ajam (non-Arabs) from Iran has also been present in Bahrain. Although the Baharna and 'Ajam share the same religious faith, they have historically spoken different languages, worshiped at separate sites, lived in distinct neighborhoods, and intermarried infrequently.

Bahrain's Sunni population historically consisted of three main groups. The first was the Al Khalifa family and their tribal allies. The second group, known as Najdis, were merchants who left the Arabian interior to pursue business opportunities on the coast. Their Sunni faith and Arab ancestry helped them form close ties with the ruling family. The third group, the Hawala – likely referring to the Sunni Achomi/laristani people of Bahrain which are often conflated with the actual Huwala Arabs, as they are claimed to have been merchant families who claimed Arab heritage and depicted their migration to the Gulf as a return to their ancestral lands after living in southern Iran, and have been Initially referred to as 'Ajam' due to their strong cultural and linguistic ties to Iran, many Hawala emphasized their Sunni faith and Arab identity over time to integrate with the dominant Sunni community. Unlike the tribesmen, who saw commerce as an unsuitable occupation, the Hawala were deeply involved in long-distance trade, multilingual, better educated, and more open to external ideas. This group played a key role in introducing anti-colonial nationalism to Bahrain during the rise of Gamal Abdel Nasser.

Later on, under pressure from Colonel Sir Lewis Pelly, Sheikh Mohammad requested military assistance from Iran, but the Government of Iran at that time provided no aid to protect Bahrain from British aggression. As a result, the Government of British India eventually overpowered Bahrain. Colonel Pelly signed an agreement with Sheikh Mohammad in May 1861 and later with his brother Sheikh Ali that placed Bahrain under British rule and protection.

In 1868, following the Qatari–Bahraini War, British representatives signed another agreement with the Al Khalifa rulers, making Bahrain part of the British protectorate territories in the Persian Gulf. It specified that the ruler could not dispose of any of his territory except to the United Kingdom and could not enter into relationships with any foreign government without British consent. In return the British promised to protect Bahrain from all aggression by sea and to lend support in case of land attack. More importantly the British promised to support the rule of the Al Khalifa in Bahrain, securing its unstable position as rulers of the country. Other agreements in 1880 and 1892 sealed the protectorate status of Bahrain to the British.

=== Economic prosperity ===
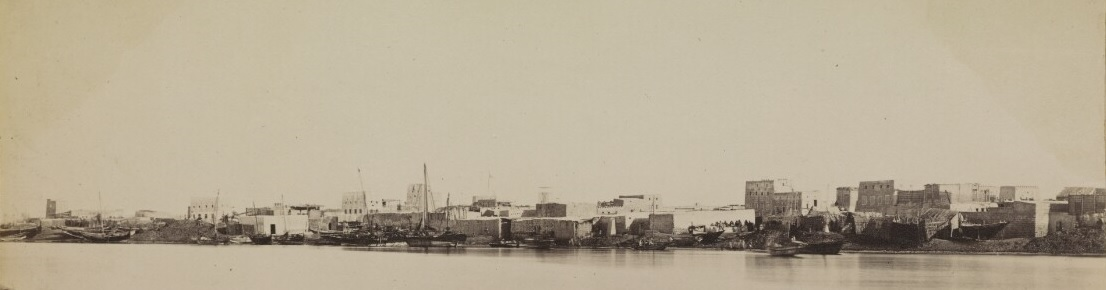
Manama harbour, circa 1870.

Peace and trade brought a new prosperity. Bahrain was no longer dependent upon pearling, and by the mid-19th century, it became the pre-eminent trading centre in the Persian Gulf, overtaking rivals Basra, Kuwait, and finally in the 1870s, Muscat. At the same time, Bahrain's socio-economic development began to diverge from the rest of the Persian Gulf: it transformed itself from a tribal trading centre into a modern state. This process was spurred by the attraction of large numbers of Persian, Huwala, and Indian merchant families who set up businesses on the island, making it the nexus of a vast web of trade routes across the Persian Gulf, Persia and the Indian sub-continent. A contemporary account of Manama in 1862 found:

Mixed with the indigenous population [of Manamah] are numerous strangers and settlers, some of whom have been established here for many generations back, attracted from other lands by the profits of either commerce or the pearl fishery, and still retaining more or less the physiognomy and garb of their native countries. Thus the gay-coloured dress of the southern Persian, the saffron-stained vest of Oman, the white robe of Nejed, and the striped gown of Bagdad, are often to be seen mingling with the light garments of Bahreyn, its blue and red turban, its white silk-fringed cloth worn Banian fashion round the waist, and its frock-like overall; while a small but unmistakable colony of Indians, merchants by profession, and mainly from Guzerat, Cutch, and their vicinity, keep up here all their peculiarities of costume and manner, and live among the motley crowd, 'among them, but not of them'.

Map of Manama in 1926.

Palgrave's description of Manama's coffee houses in the mid-19th century portrays them as cosmopolitan venues in contrast to what he describes as the 'closely knit and bigoted universe of central Arabia'. Palgrave describes a people with an open – even urbane – outlook: "Of religious controversy I have never heard one word. In short, instead of Zelators and fanatics, camel-drivers and Bedouins, we have at Bahrain [Manama] something like 'men of the world, who know the world like men' a great relief to the mind; certainly it was so to mine."

The great trading families that emerged during this period have been compared to the Borgias and Medicis and their great wealth – long before the oil wealth for which the region would later be renowned – gave them extensive power, and among the most prominent were the Persian Al Safar family, who held the position of Native Agents of Britain in the 19th century. The Al Safar enjoyed an 'exceptionally close' relationship with the Al Khalifa clan from 1869, although the al-Khalifa never intermarried with them – it has been speculated that this could be related to political reasons (to limit the Safars' influence with the ruling family) and possibly for religious reasons (because the Safars were Shia).

As a result of Bahrain's trade with India, the cultural influence of the subcontinent grew dramatically, with styles of dress, cuisine, and education showing a marked Indian influence. According to Exeter University's James Onley "In these and countless other ways, eastern Arabia's ports and people were as much a part of the Indian Ocean world as they were a part of the Arab world."

=== Early 20th century reforms ===
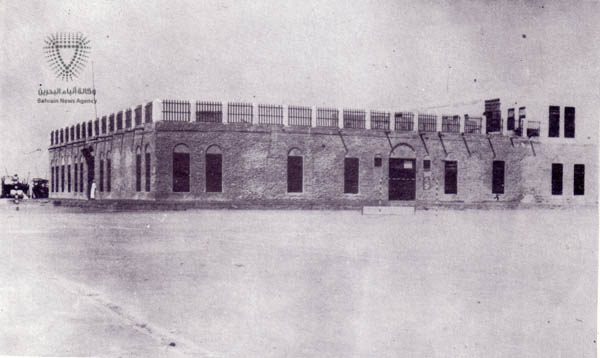
Al-Hidaya Al-Khalifia Boys school.

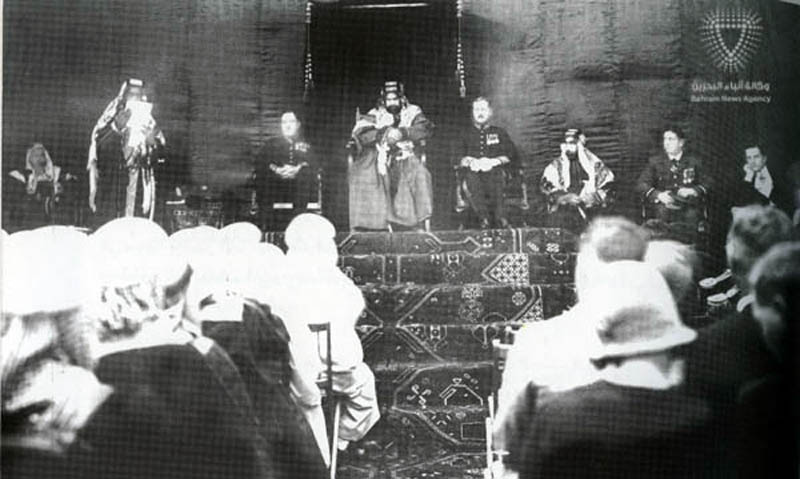
Coronation of Hamad bin Isa Al Khalifa as the Hakim of Bahrain in 1933.

Unrest amongst the people of Bahrain began when Britain officially established complete dominance over the territory in 1892. The first revolt and widespread uprising took place in March 1895 against Sheikh Issa bin Ali, then ruler of Bahrain. Sheikh Issa was the first of the Al Khalifa to rule without Iranian relations. Sir Arnold Wilson, Britain's representative in the Persian Gulf and author of The Persian Gulf, arrived in Bahrain from Mascat at this time. The uprising developed further with some protesters killed by British forces.

Bahrain underwent a period of major social reform between 1926 and 1957, under the de facto rule of Charles Belgrave, the British advisor to Shaikh Hamad ibn Isa Al-Khalifa (1872-1942). The country's first modern school was established in 1919, with the opening of the Al-Hiddaya Boys School, while the Persian Gulf's first girls school opened in 1928. The American Mission Hospital, established by the Dutch Reform Church, began work in 1903. Other reforms include the abolition of slavery, while the pearl diving industry developed at a rapid pace.

These reforms were often vigorously opposed by powerful groups within Bahrain including sections within the ruling family and merchants. In order to counter conservatives, the British removed the Ruler, Isa ibn Ali Al Khalifa in 1923 and replaced him with his son. Some Sunni families left Bahrain to mainland Arabia, whilst clerical opponents of social reforms were exiled to Saudi Arabia and Iran. The heads of some merchant and notable families were likewise exiled. Britain's interest in Bahrain's development was motivated by concerns over the ambitions of the Saudi-Wahabi and the Iranians.

== Discovery of oil ==
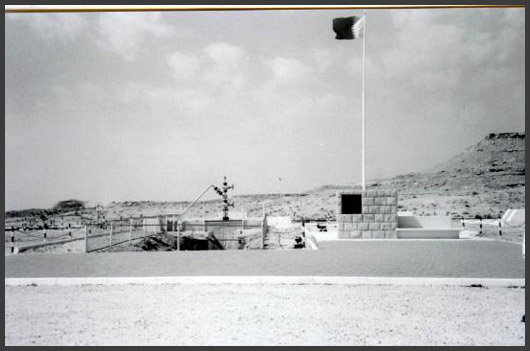
First Oil Well, Bahrain.

The discovery of oil in 1932 by the Bahrain Petroleum Company brought rapid modernisation to Bahrain. Relations with the United Kingdom became closer, as evidenced by the British Royal Navy moving its entire Middle Eastern command from Bushehr in Iran to Bahrain in 1935. British influence continued to grow as the country developed, culminating with the appointment of Charles Belgrave as advisor. He went on to establish a modern education system in Bahrain. The oil company was however 100% American capital, no British firm was willing to take the risk of exploration at the time.

Bahrain participated in the Second World War as part of the British Empire, specifically the British Indian Empire as a Gulf Residency on the Allied side, joining on 10 September 1939. On 19 October 1940, four Italian SM.82s bombers bombed Bahrain alongside Dhahran oilfields in Saudi Arabia, targeting Allied-operated oil refineries. Although minimal damage was caused in both locations, the attack forced the Allies to upgrade Bahrain's defences which further stretched Allied military resources. After World War II, increasing anti-British sentiment spread throughout the Arab World and led to riots in Bahrain. The riots focused on the Jewish community, which included distinguished writers, singers, accountants, engineers and middle managers working for the oil company, textile merchants with business all over the peninsula, and free professionals.

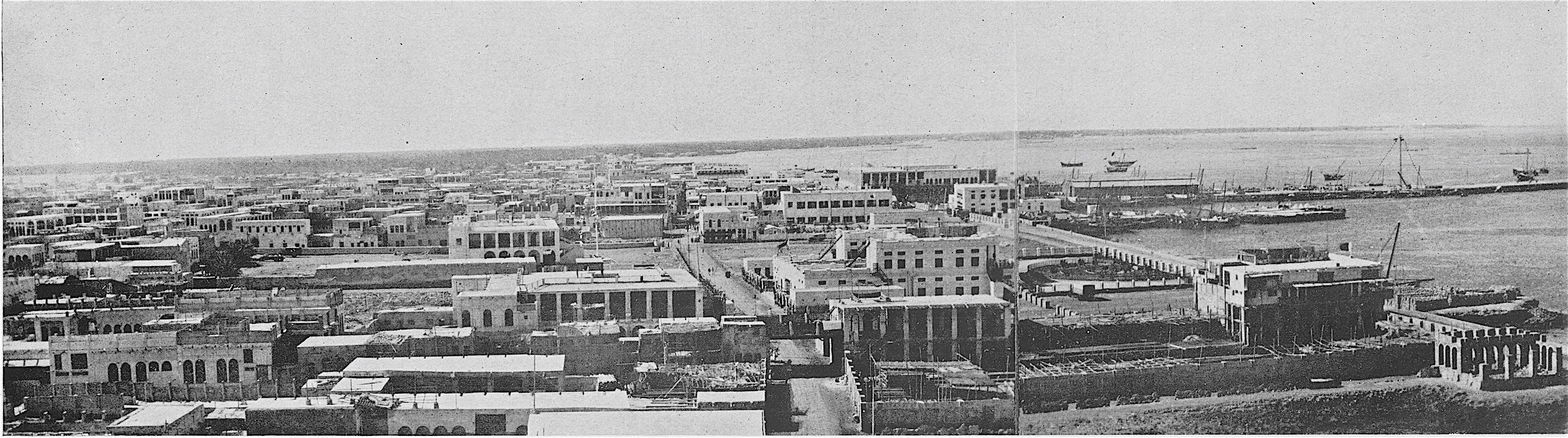
Manama in 1945.

=== The leftist movement ===
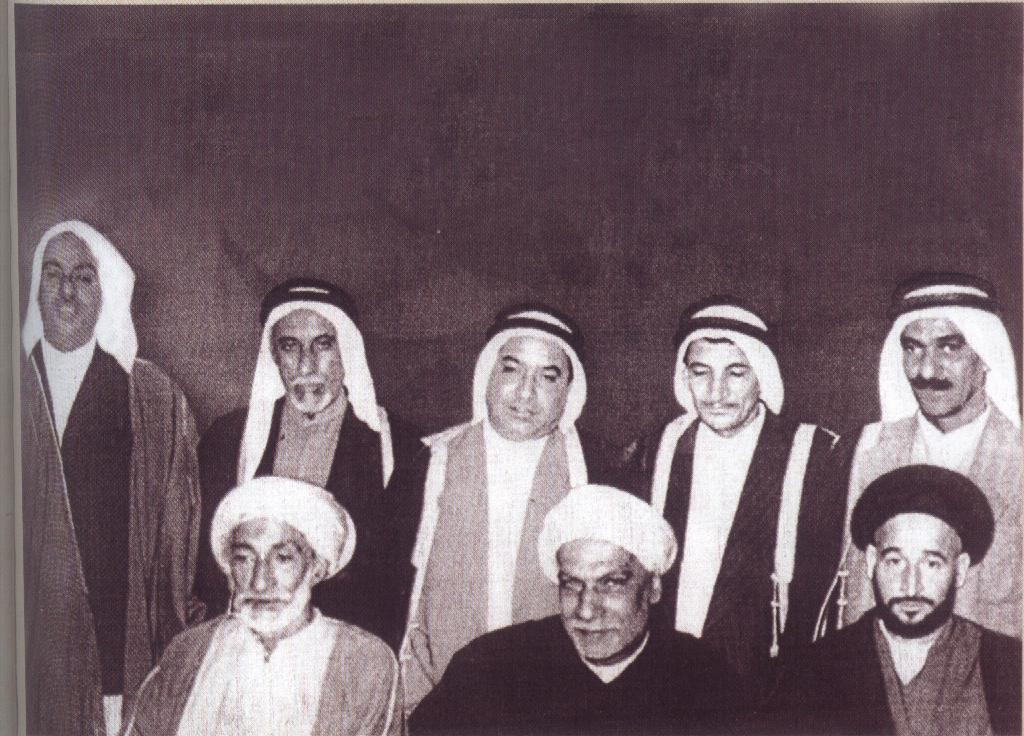
The National Union Committee members in 1954

The National Union Committee (NUC), a leftist nationalist movement associated with the labour unions, was formed in 1954 calling for the end of British interference and political reforms. Work sites were plagued with frequent strikes and occasional riots (including several fatalities) during this period. Following riots in support of Egypt defending itself against the tripartite invasion during 1956 Suez Crisis, the British decided to put an end to the NUC challenge to their presence in Bahrain. The NUC and its offshoots were declared illegal. Its leaders were arrested, tried and imprisoned. Some fled the country while others were forcibly deported.

Strikes and riots continued during the 1960s, now under the leadership of underground cells of the NUC, namely the communist National Liberation Front and the Popular Front for the Liberation of Bahrain, the Bahraini section of the Arab Nationalist Movement.

In March 1965, an uprising broke out, called the March Intifada, against the British presence in Bahrain. The spark of the riots was the laying off of hundreds of Bahraini workers at the Bahrain Petroleum Company. Several people died in the sometimes violent clashes between protesters and police.

== Independent Bahrain ==
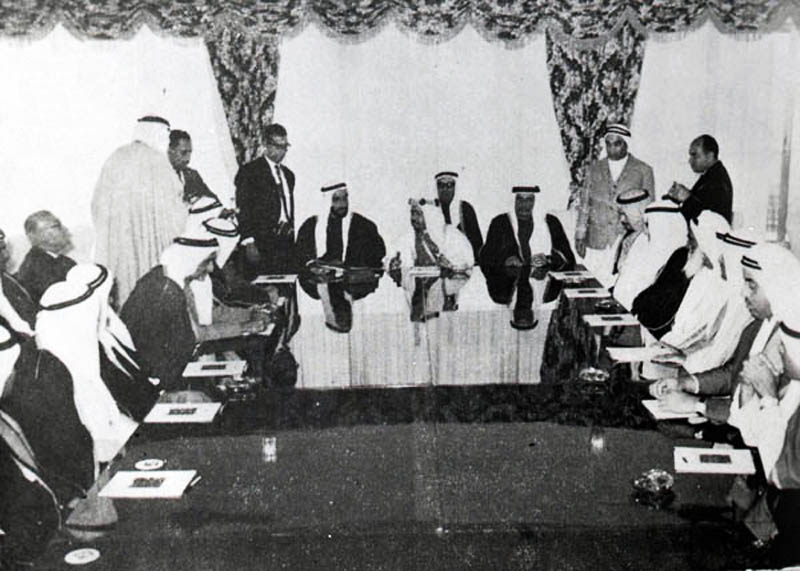
The emir Isa bin Salman Al Khalifa heads the opening session of the first conference on the formation of a union of the Gulf emirates in February 1968.

After World War II, Bahrain became the centre for British administration of the lower Persian Gulf.

In 1968, when the British Government announced its decision to end the treaty relationships with the Persian Gulf sheikdoms, Bahrain joined with Qatar and the seven Trucial States (which now form the United Arab Emirates) under British protection in an effort to form a union of Arab emirates. By mid-1971, however, the nine sheikhdoms still had not agreed on the terms of union. Accordingly, Bahrain sought independence as a separate entity.

In 1969, both the British and Iranian governments agreed to approach the United Nations Secretariat to resolve the dispute of Bahrain's sovereignty. In early 1970, the Iranian government asked the UN secretary-general to assess the will of the Bahraini people with regards to their sovereignty. The survey (sometimes referred to as a "referendum") took the form of a United Nations poll on whether islanders preferred independence or Iranian control. The report of the Personal Representative of the Secretary-General on the consultation stated that "the overwhelming majority of the people of Bahrain wish to gain recognition of their identity in a full independent and sovereign State free to decide for itself its relations with other States."

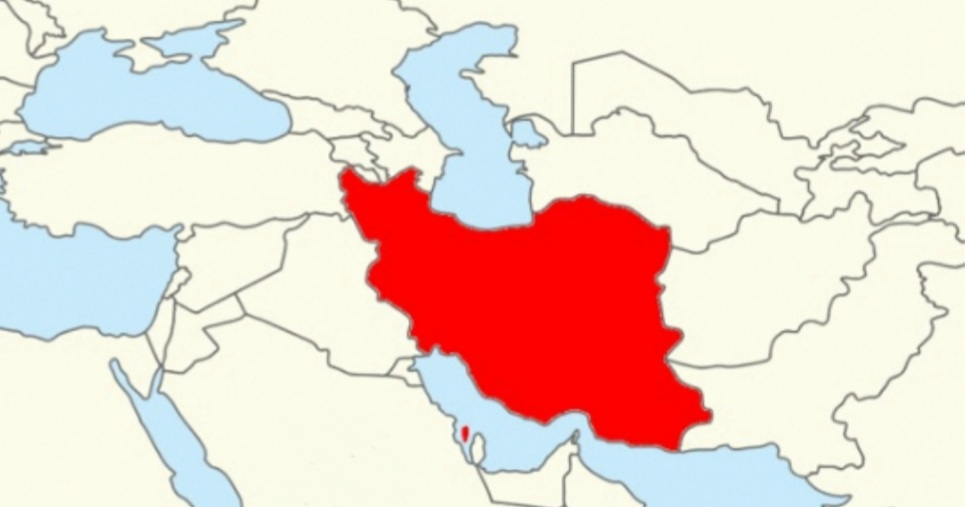
Bahrain province before Independence, was simultaneously part of Iran, a British protectorate whilst at the same time it was ruled "locally" by the Al-Khalifa tribe.

At 12:50 p.m. on 26 March 1970, London Radio announced that both Britain and Iran had submitted a request to the Secretary-General of the United Nations to send a representative from the international organization to survey the opinion of the people of Bahrain as to whether they wish to remain under British Protectorate or to have Independence or be part of Iran. Musa Al-Ansari (one of the Ajam of Bahrain) recounts that he voted on the promise for the country to be an independent democratic country that respects minorities, "I went to vote as a Bahraini, but I do not want to lose my identity as a Persian."

As a result, the United Nations Security Council unanimously passed Resolution 278 on 11 May 1970, while in the same month Iran renounced its claim to the island. The country subsequently became independent from the United Kingdom, declaring independence on 15 August 1971, and becoming formally independent as the State of Bahrain on 16 December 1971.

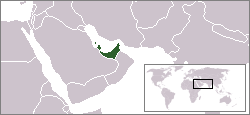
The proposed federation of Arab emirates

At independence, the permanent Royal Navy presence in Bahrain ended and the United States Navy moved onto the 10 acres (40,000 m^{2}) previously occupied by British operations. The installation later grew into Naval Support Activity Bahrain, headquarters for the United States Fifth Fleet.

The emirate emerged just as the price of oil skyrocketed after the 1973 Yom Kippur War; while Bahrain's own reserves were being depleted the high oil price meant there was massive capitalisation in the Kingdom's neighbours. The Kingdom was able to exploit the situation thanks to another war in the Levant in 1975: the Lebanese Civil War. Beirut had long been the financial centre of the Arab world, but the outbreak of hostilities in the country had an immediate impact on the banking industry. Bahrain offered a new location at the centre of the booming Persian Gulf with a large educated indigenous workforce and sound fiscal regulations. Realizing the opportunity to become a financial centre resulted in growth in other industries in the country.

This bolstered the development of the middle class and gave Bahrain a very different class structure from its tribal dominated neighbours. Although there had long been a large Indian presence in Bahrain, it was at this time that mass migration to the Kingdom began to take off with subsequent consequences for the Kingdom's demographics. Large numbers of immigrants from Third World countries such as the Philippines, Pakistan, Egypt, and Iran were attracted by better salaries than at home.

=== The constitutional experiment ===
Based on its new 1973 constitution, Bahraini men elected its first National Assembly in 1973 (although Article 43 of the 1973 Constitution states that the Assembly is to be elected by "universal suffrage", the conditional clause "in accordance with the provisions of the electoral law" allowed the regime to prevent women from participating). Although the Assembly and then-Emir Isa ibn Salman al-Khalifa quarrelled over a number of issues (foreign policy; the U.S. naval presence, and the budget), the biggest clash came over the State Security Law (SSL). The Assembly refused to ratify the government-sponsored law, which allowed, among other things, the arrest and detention of people for up to three years, (renewable) without a trial.

The legislative stalemate over this act created a public crisis, and on 25 August 1975, the emir dissolved the Assembly. The emir then ratified the State Security Law by decree, and suspended those articles in the constitution dealing with the legislative powers of the Assembly. In that same year, the emir established the State Security Court, whose judgments were not subject to appeal.

=== Iranian Revolution and social and political change ===
The tide of political Islam that swept the Middle East in the 1970s, culminating in the Iranian revolution in 1979 was to have profound implications for Bahrain's social and political development.

There were a number of factors that had caused Bahrain to be more liberal than its neighbours, but these were challenged by the rise of Islamic religious fundamentalism. Bahrain's pluralist traditions were to a large extent a result of the complex confessional and demographic makeup of the country, which required Shi'as, Sunnis, ethnic Huwalas, and Ajams, as well as a plethora of minority faiths, to live and work together. This tolerance had been buttressed by the prominence of Arab nationalism and Marxism as the main modes of dissent, both of which were socially progressive and downplayed religious affiliations. The country's traditional dependence on trade further encouraged openness. It was the political earthquake represented by the Shah's fall that changed the dynamics of Bahrain's politics.

Sectarian conflicts increased following the Islamic revolution of Iran, Dr. Ali Akbar Bushehri recounts that the "Khomeini Revolution" created a rift between the Ajams of Bahrain. Majority of Bahraini Iranians were opposed to the Revolution, but they started supporting it over time.

In 1981, the Islamic Front for the Liberation of Bahrain (an alleged Iranian front organisation), attempted a coup d'état. Their goal was the assassination of Bahrain's leadership and installing an Islamist theocracy with a cleric as supreme leader. The attempted coup and the outbreak of the Iran–Iraq War led to the formation of the Gulf Cooperation Council, which Bahrain joined with Kuwait, Oman, Qatar, Saudi Arabia, and the United Arab Emirates. The sense of regional uncertainty was further heightened when Saddam Hussein's Iraq invaded Kuwait, triggering the 1991 Persian Gulf War.

=== 1990s ===
The 1990s saw growing criticism of the lack of democratic reforms. The unrest resulted in approximately forty deaths and ended after Hamad ibn Isa Al Khalifa became the Emir in 1999. The emir appointed a 30-member Consultative Council for a four-year term in December 1992. Demonstrations followed the arrest of Shia cleric, Sheikh Ali Salman, on 5 December 1994 after he called for the restoration of the National Assembly and criticised the ruling family. A group of youths clashed with police after throwing stones at female runners during an international marathon for running bare-legged. In January 1995, Sheikh Ali Salman was deported and sought asylum in Britain. A cabinet reshuffle in June 1995, brought five Shia ministers into the government. Shia cleric, Sheikh Abdul Amir al-Jamri, arrested in April 1995, was released five months later. After bomb explosions in Manama's business quarter, Al-Jamri was arrested again on 18 January 1996. A Sunni lawyer and poet, Ahmad al-Shamlan, was also detained on 8 February, but released in April. In June 1996, the government claimed it had uncovered another Iranian-backed coup plot by a group called "Hezbollah-Bahrain". Bahrain recalled its ambassador to Iran and downgraded its representation to chargé d'affaires level. In September 1996 the Consultative Council was increased from 30 to 40 members.

The political impasse continued over the next few years during which time the regime dealt with its opponents using severe repression. Bomb attacks and police brutality marked this period in which over forty people were killed in violence between the two sides. Although the violence was never entirely stopped by the security measures, it was contained and continued as low-level intermittent disturbances.

In December 1998 Bahrain provided military facilities for "Operation Desert Fox", the US and UK bombing campaign against Iraq.

The emir, Sheikh Isa, died in March 1999, and was succeeded by his eldest son, Hamad bin Isa Al Khalifa. Sheikh al-Jamri was sentenced to 10 years' imprisonment in July 1999, but then pardoned by the new Emir. For the first time, non-Muslims (a Christian and a Jewish businessman) and four women were appointed to the Consultative Council in September 2000.

=== 2000s ===
In 2001 Bahrainis strongly backed proposals put by the emir – now the king – to turn the country into a constitutional monarchy with an elected parliament and an independent judiciary. A referendum on 14–15 February 2001 massively supported the National Action Charter. The emir gave women the right to vote, and released all political prisoners. As part of the adoption of the National Action Charter on 14 February 2002, Bahrain changed its formal name from the State (dawla) of Bahrain to the Kingdom of Bahrain.

Local elections were held in May 2002. For the first time women could vote and stand as candidates, but failed to win a seat. Parliamentary elections – the first such in nearly 30 years – were held in October 2002 for a 40-member parliament, the Council of Deputies, which included a dozen Shia MPs. Authorities said the turnout was more than 50% despite a call by critics for a boycott.

In May 2003 thousands of victims of alleged torture petitioned the king to cancel a law which prevents them from suing suspected torturers. Nada Haffadh was made health minister in April 2004 – the first woman to head a government ministry. The following month, protests in Manama against fighting in the Iraqi holy cities of Najaf and Karbala saw the king sack his interior minister after police tried to prevent the protest. In March–June 2005, thousands of protest marchers demanded a fully elected parliament. In the general election of November 2006, the Shia opposition won 40% of the seats. A Shia Muslim, Jawad Al-Arrayedh, was named as a deputy prime minister.

A Jewish woman, Houda Nonoo, was appointed Bahrain's ambassador to the US in 2008 May. She is believed to be the Arab world's first Jewish ambassador.

Authorities arrested several people who allegedly planned to detonate homemade bombs during Bahrain's national celebrations in December 2008. In April 2009, the King pardoned more than 170 prisoners charged with endangering national security, including 35 Shias being tried on charges of trying to overthrow the state. However, in September 2010, in the run up to the elections, 20 Shia opposition leaders were arrested and accused of plotting to overthrow monarchy by promoting violent protests and sabotage. In the October parliamentary elections, the main Shia opposition group, Al Wefaq, could make only slender gains.

The country participated in military action against the Taliban in October 2001 by deploying a frigate in the Arabian Sea for rescue and humanitarian operations. As a result, in November of that year, US president George W. Bush's administration designated Bahrain as a "major non-NATO ally". Bahrain opposed the invasion of Iraq and had offered Saddam Hussein asylum in the days prior to the invasion. Relations improved with neighbouring Qatar after the border dispute over the Hawar Islands was resolved by the International Court of Justice in The Hague in 2001. Bahrain negotiated a free trade agreement with the United States in 2004, although Saudi Arabia criticized the move, saying it hindered regional economic integration.

Qatar and Bahrain have made plans to build the Qatar-Bahrain Friendship Bridge to link the countries across the Persian Gulf, which would be the longest fixed-link bridge in the world if completed.

==== Bahraini uprising (2011) ====
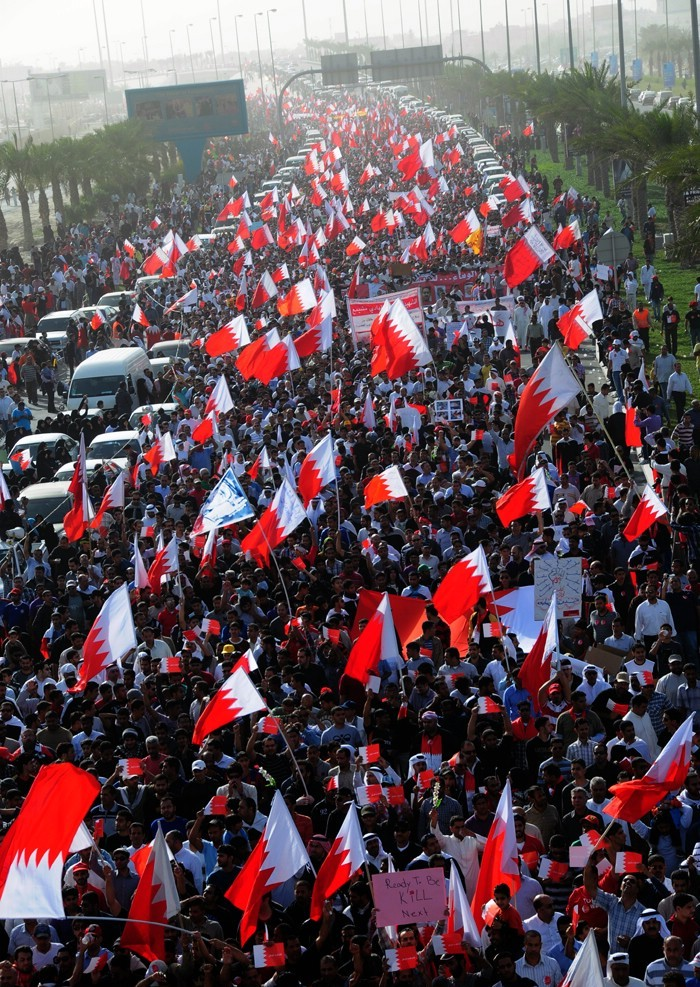
Over 100,000 of Bahrainis taking part in the "March of Loyalty to Martyrs", honoring political dissidents killed by security forces, on 22 February.

The protests in Bahrain started on 14 February, and were initially aimed at achieving greater political freedom and respect for human rights; they were not intended to directly threaten the monarchy. Lingering frustration among the Shiite majority with being ruled by the Sunni government was a major root cause, but the protests in Tunisia and Egypt are cited as the inspiration for the demonstrations. The protests were largely peaceful until a pre-dawn raid by police on 17 February to clear protestors from Pearl Roundabout in Manama, in which police killed four protesters. Following the raid, some protesters began to expand their aims to a call for the end of the monarchy. On 18 February army forces opened fire on protesters when they tried to reenter the roundabout, fatally wounding one. The following day protesters reoccupied Pearl Roundabout after the government ordered troops and police to withdraw. Subsequent days saw large demonstrations; on 21 February a pro-government Gathering of National Unity drew tens of thousands, whilst on 22 February the number of protestors at the Pearl Roundabout peaked at over 150,000 after more than 100,000 protesters marched there. On 14 March, Saudi-led GCC forces were requested by the government and entered the country, which the opposition called an "occupation".

King Hamad bin Isa Al Khalifa declared a three-month state of emergency on 15 March and asked the military to reassert its control as clashes spread across the country. On 16 March, armed soldiers and riot police cleared the protesters' camp in the Pearl Roundabout, in which 3 policemen and 3 protesters were reportedly killed. Later, on 18 March, the government tore down Pearl Roundabout monument. After the lifting of emergency law on 1 June, several large rallies were staged by the opposition parties. Smaller-scale protests and clashes outside of the capital have continued to occur almost daily. On 9 March 2012 over 100,000 protested in what the opposition called "the biggest march in our history".

The police response has been described as a "brutal" crackdown on "peaceful and unarmed" protestors, including doctors and bloggers. The police carried out midnight house raids in Shia neighbourhoods, beatings at checkpoints, and denial of medical care in a "campaign of intimidation". More than 2,929 people have been arrested, and at least five people died from torture while in police custody. On 23 November 2011 the Bahrain Independent Commission of Inquiry released its report on its investigation of the events, finding that the government had systematically tortured prisoners and committed other human rights violations. It also rejected the government's claims that the protests were instigated by Iran. Although the report found that systematic torture had stopped, the Bahraini government has refused entry to several international human rights groups and news organizations, and delayed a visit by a UN inspector. More than 120 people had died since the start of the uprising.

=== 2020s and contemporary developments ===
From 2020 onward, Bahrain, like much of the world, was significantly affected by the COVID-19 pandemic, recording its first confirmed case in February 2020, and implementing public health measures alongside economic stimulus efforts to mitigate the pandemic's health and economic impacts. In September 2020, Bahrain, alongside the United Arab Emirates, became the third and fourth Arab states to normalise diplomatic relations with Israel under the U.S.-brokered Abraham Accords – establishing formal ties and cooperation frameworks, which were later resumed at ambassadorial level after a temporary withdrawal of envoys in 2023. Throughout the decade the country has pursued economic diversification under Bahrain Economic Vision 2030, aiming to strengthen non-oil sectors while attracting foreign direct investment and hosting high-level investment forums resulting in multibillion-dollar agreements and partnerships across technology, infrastructure and services. Despite these efforts, Bahrain has faced ongoing fiscal pressures, including elevated public debt and budget deficits that have challenged financial stability and prompted sovereign bond issuances to international markets.

Bahrain has also deepened bilateral cooperation with regional and global partners, including Qatar. In April 2023, Bahrain and Qatar agreed to restore diplomatic relations following meetings of a bilateral follow-up committee hosted by the Gulf Cooperation Council in Riyadh, ending a rupture that had lasted since the 2017 Gulf diplomatic crisis. The agreement provided for the resumption of official contacts and the normalization of bilateral relations within the GCC framework. In the period that followed, the two states exchanged ambassadors and resumed dialogue on practical areas of cooperation, including trade, transportation, and long-standing infrastructure proposals such as the Qatar–Bahrain "Friendship Bridge".

In March 2025, Bahrain's National Space Science Agency (NSSA) successfully placed "Al Munther", the first satellite designed and built in the country, into orbit on a SpaceX Falcon 9 rocket as part of the Transporter-13 mission. The nano-satellite, equipped with AI-based image processing capabilities, was deployed into low Earth orbit and is intended to support environmental monitoring and other applications. The launch marked the first time a Bahraini-developed satellite entered space.

== See also ==
- Bahrain National Museum
- History of the Jews in Bahrain
- History of the Middle East
- Murair
