= Economy of the Middle East =

Economy of Middle East

Statistics
- Population: 371 million
- GDP: $5.5 trillion (nominal; 2025 est); $13.8 trillion (PPP; 2025 est)
- GDP growth: 3.2% (2023 est.)
- GDP per capita: $19,860 (nominal; 2023 est); $32,000 (PPP; 2024 est)
- Inflation (CPI): ▲11.3% (2023 est.)
- Unemployment: ▲10.6% (2021)

Public finance
- Government debt: 35% of GDP (2023 est.)
- Most numbers are from the International Monetary Fund. IMF Middle East Datasets All values, unless otherwise stated, are in US dollars.

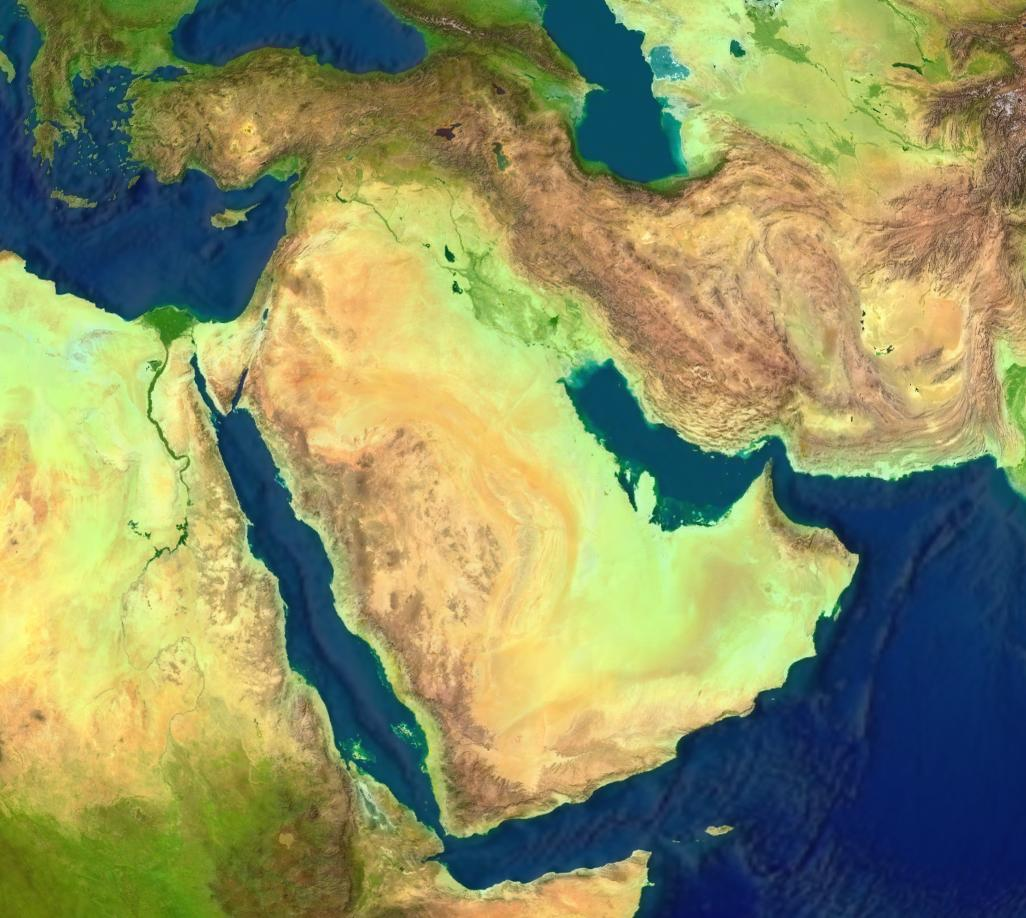
Satellite image of the Middle East

The economy of the Middle East is highly diverse, encompassing a range of economic systems and levels of development. Some countries are wealthy hydrocarbon exporters, while others have centrally planned economies, emerging market structures, or more liberalized, service-oriented markets. Beyond oil and gas, the region’s economies vary in terms of industrialization agriculture, tourism, finance, and technology sectors.

Many Middle Eastern nations have undertaken efforts to diversify their economic bases in recent decades, investing in infrastructure, education, renewable energy, and knowledge-based industries. While natural resources continue to play a significant role in some states, others increasingly rely on trade, services, and industrial production as drivers of growth The economic landscape is thus shaped by both historical resource endowments and contemporary policies aimed at reducing dependency on any single sector.

== Overview ==
Venezuela and Middle Eastern countries have the largest proven crude oil reserves.

Middle East economic integration as a means to sustain peace.

Since early 2026, the region's economies have been hit by war involving Iran and the closure of the Strait of Hormuz, announced by Iran's Revolutionary Guard on 28 February 2026. The route carried about 20 million barrels of oil daily and 110 billion cubic meters of liquefied natural gas. In October 2026, the International Monetary Fund forecast that the Middle East and North Africa economy would shrink by 2% in 2026 and grow by 7% in 2027.Gulf exporters whose shipments pass through the strait were expected to contract the most, including Iraq, Bahrain, Kuwait, and Qatar.

IMF Growth Projections, October 2026 (real GDP, % change)
Country	2025	2026	2027
Saudi Arabia	4.6	-3.3	7.9
Iran	-0.9	-7.6	3.6
United Arab Emirates	6.2	-3.9	7.7
Iraq	-0.4	-16.0	19.0
Qatar	1.8	-15.5	18.8
Kuwait	2.7	-16.7	17.1
Oman	2.4	4.1	2.2
Bahrain	3.5	-11.3	13.9
Jordan	2.8	2.7	3.1
Yemen	-0.5	-1.5	0.0
West Bank and Gaza	4.3	-	-
Middle East and North Africa	3.3	-2.0	7.0
Egypt	4.4	5.1	4.7
Israel	3.5	4.5	4.4
Lebanon	4.0	-	-
Syria	-	-	-

Country	GDP Per Capita (PPP) (Thousands of US$) 2024	GDP (PPP) (Billions of US$) 2024	GDP Nominal (Billions of US$) 2024
Bahrain	$62.75	$95.97	$44.994
Egypt	$17.79	$1,899	$438.348
Iran	$20.69	$1,855	$464
Iraq	$12.05	$508	$254.070
Israel	$53.37	$552	$530
Jordan	$13.44	$132.092	$50.609
Kuwait	$53.76	$256	$159.687
Lebanon	$11.79 (2022; latest)	$78.910	$21.780
Oman	$40.02	$200.947	$108.282
Palestine	$6.82	$ N/A	N/A
Qatar	$118.15	$328.134	$235.500
Saudi Arabia	$71.37	$2,354	$1,106
Syria	$6.37 (2010; latest)	$102.5	$77.460
Turkey	$43.62	$3,832	$1,323
United Arab Emirates (UAE)	$92.954	$952	$527.796
Yemen	$2.1	$69	$28.134

== By country and territory ==
=== Bahrain ===
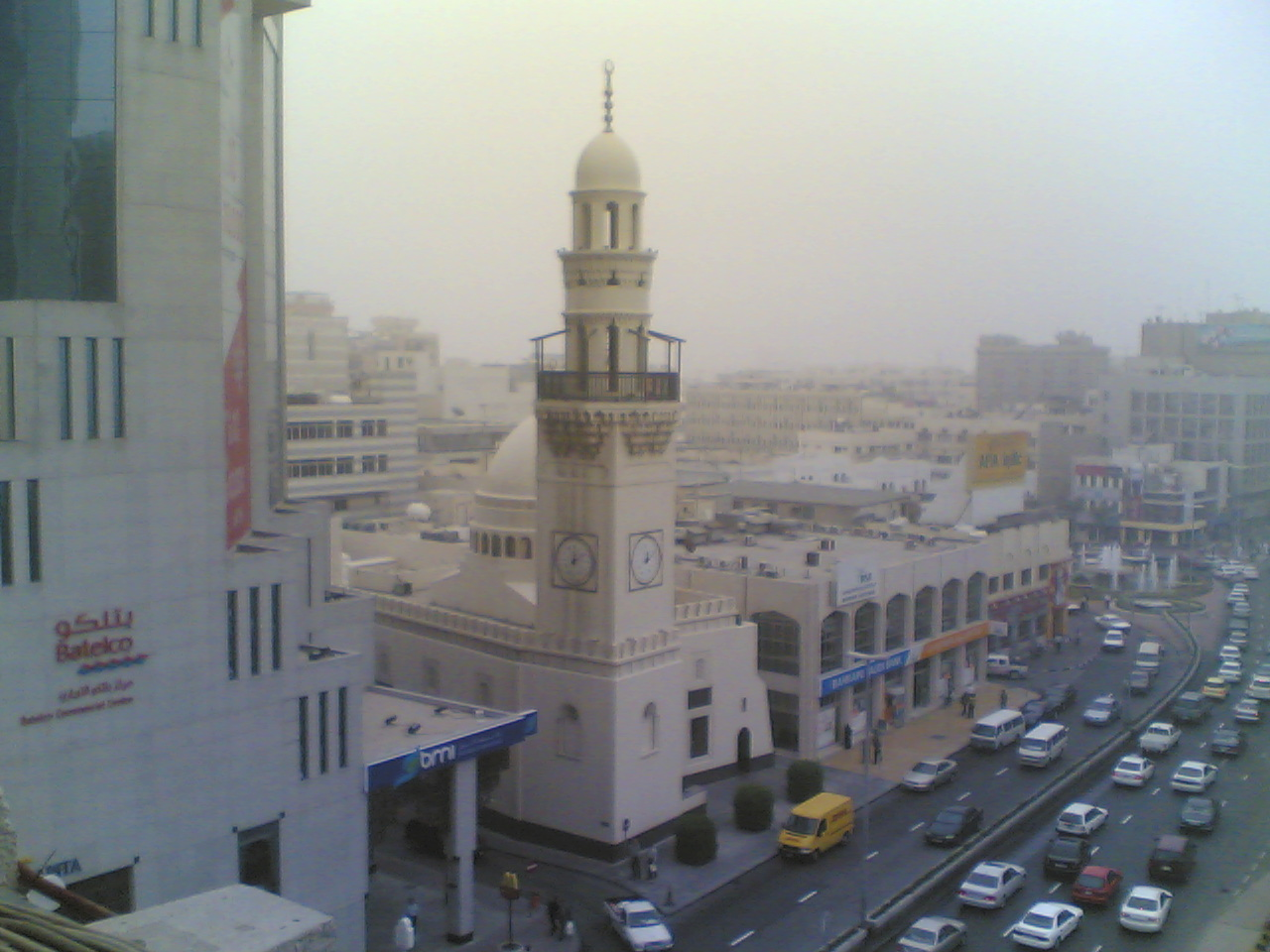
Central Manama

In 2018 Bahrain has a per capita GDP of US$50,700. Bahrain has the Persian Gulf's first "post-oil" economy. Since the late 20th century, Bahrain has heavily invested in the banking and tourism sectors. The country's capital, Manama, is home to many large financial institutions. Bahrain has a high Human Development Index (ranked 48th in the world) and was recognised by the World Bank as a high income economy. Bahrain has expanded its industrial capacity to include aluminum production and signed a Free Trade Agreement with the United States in an effort to expand its export base. Bahrain has also positioned itself as a strong player in Islamic banking in an effort to expand beyond resource exports and into a greater role in the international service industry.

=== Egypt ===
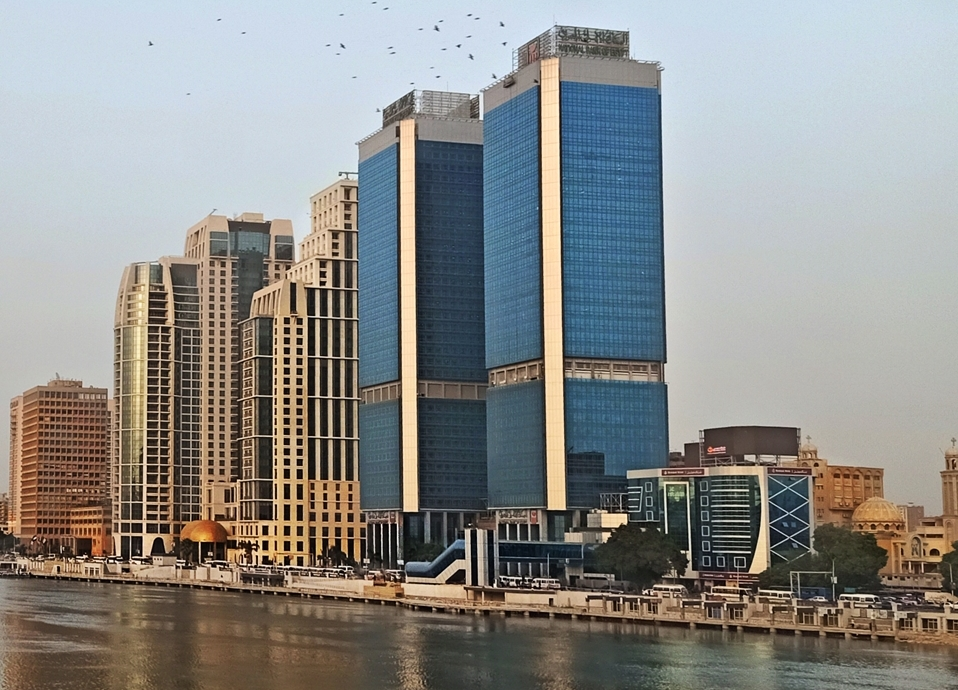
Cairo

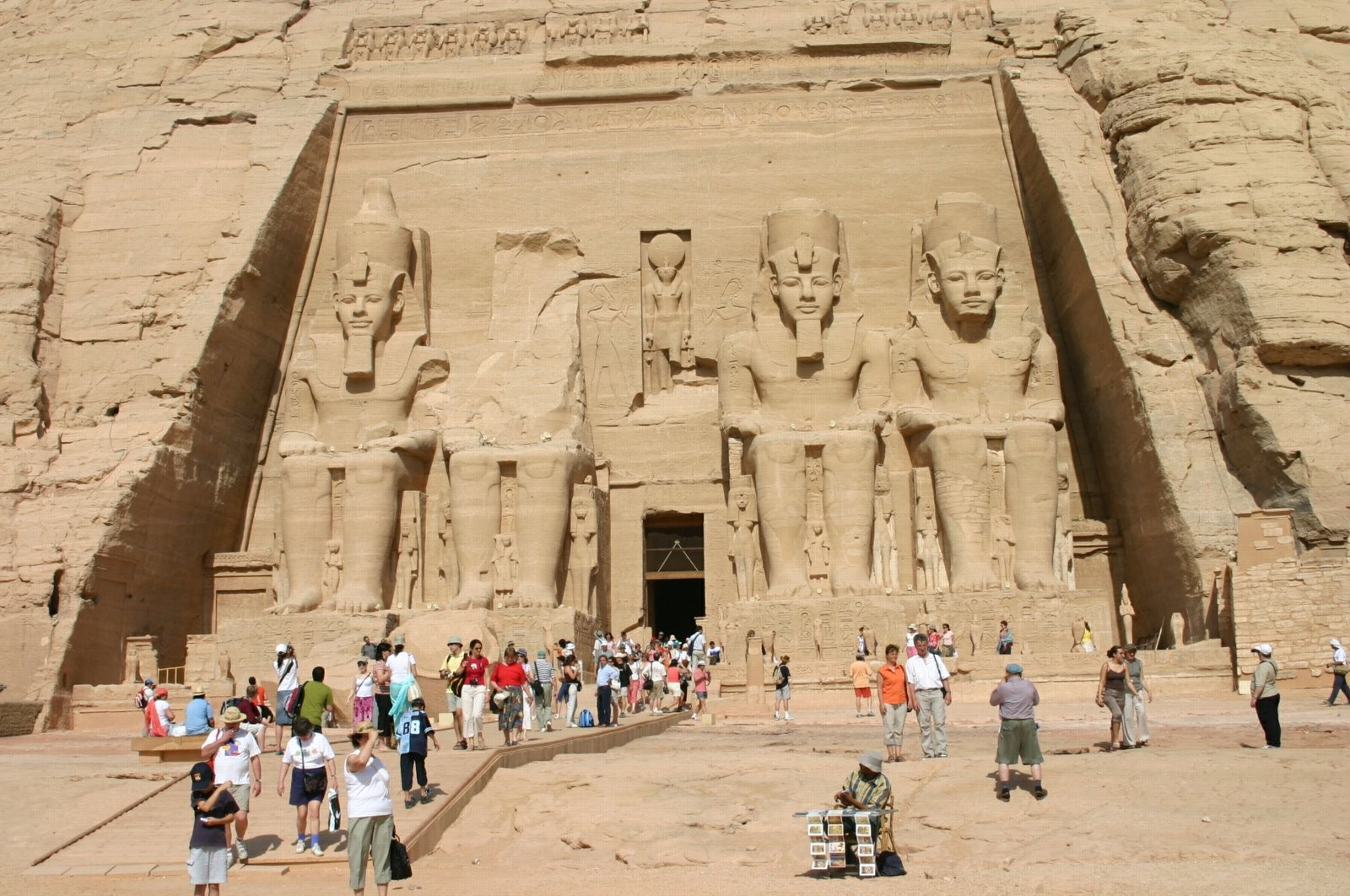
Tourist visiting the ancient Egyptian temple Abu Simbel.

Egypt derives a great deal of its foreign exchange from tourism. Consequently, most of its labor force is devoted to the service sector. Agriculture is also a large part of the Egyptian economy. The Nile River provides Egypt with some of the most fertile land in the Middle East. It produces food for consumption and export as well as cotton for domestic and foreign textile production. Egypt's other great resource is the Suez Canal. Roughly 7.5% of global sea trade transits the canal providing Egypt revenues in excess of $3 billion annually. Egypt's industrial base dates to the 1960s, when the nation undertook import substitution industrialization policies. The inefficiencies of the state-run program have led the government to begin a privatization program and as a result Egypt enjoyed substantial GDP growth in the first decade of the 21st century. It has also taken advantage of Qualifying Industrial Zone to expand trade relations with the United States. Despite these developments Egypt remains a developing country with a per capita GDP of $5,500. The Egyptian Commodities Exchange is the first electronic exchange in the MENA (Middle East and North Africa) region, abolishing a monopoly and allowing small farmers to trade at reasonable market prices.

=== Iran ===
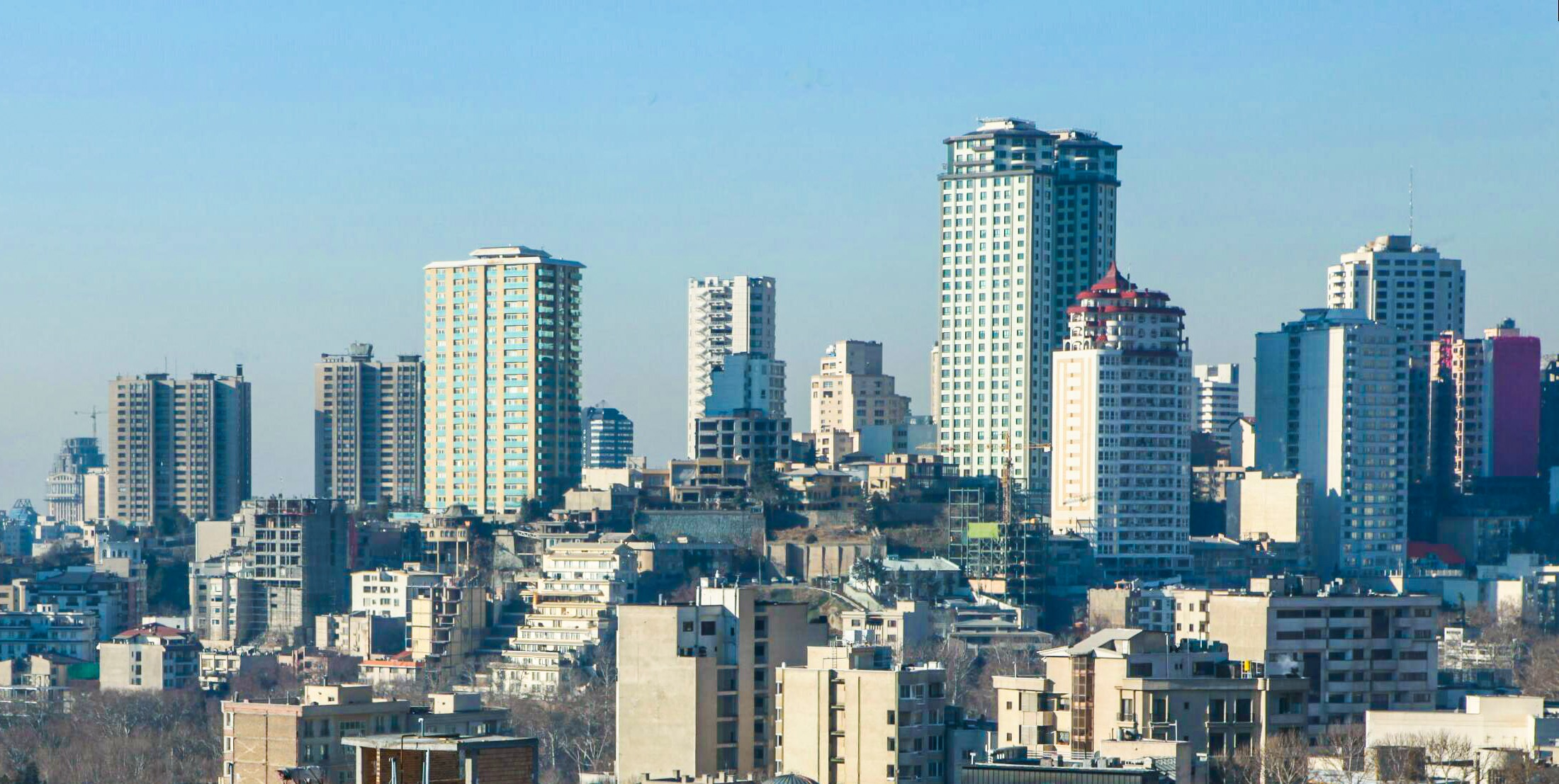
Tehran

Iran has one of the largest economies in the Middle East. It is the world's 18th largest by PPP. Iran's major industries are largely state-owned. The nature of the Iranian state-owned enterprises has led to a degree of inefficiency. Iran ranks 69th out of 139 in Global Competitiveness Report. Iran has been able to subsidize inefficient industry with its large oil revenues, and maintain respectable growth rates. The nature of the state-driven economy has led to significant brain drain in recent years as educated Iranians seek opportunities abroad. Consequently, Iran has begun a privatization effort in order to stimulate trade in accordance with its ongoing five-year plan, and has also undertaken an ambitious economic reform plan.

An advantage that Iran's capital market has in comparison with other regional markets is that there are 40 industries directly involved in it. Industries, including the automotive, telecommunications, agriculture, petrochemical, mining, steel, iron, copper, banking and insurance, financial intermediation and others trade shares at the Tehran Stock Exchange, which makes Iran unique in the Middle East. The N-11 speculates Iran has a high potential to become one of the world's largest growing economies in the 21st century.

In 2018 Gottfried Leibbrandt, chief executive of SWIFT, said in Belgium that some banks in Iran would be disconnected from this financial messaging service. On 13 November 2018 International Monetary Fund released a report and predicted that Iran's inflation rate would go as high as 40% by the end the year.

According to the Statistical Center of Iran, Iran's annual inflation rate stood at 42.4% during the month December 21, 2021 to January 20, 2022. Prices continued to rise for housing & utilities (28.5% vs 27.9 in January); transport (36.1% vs 35.3%); communication (3.8% vs 2.3%); and tobacco (35.0% vs 33.3%).

=== Iraq ===
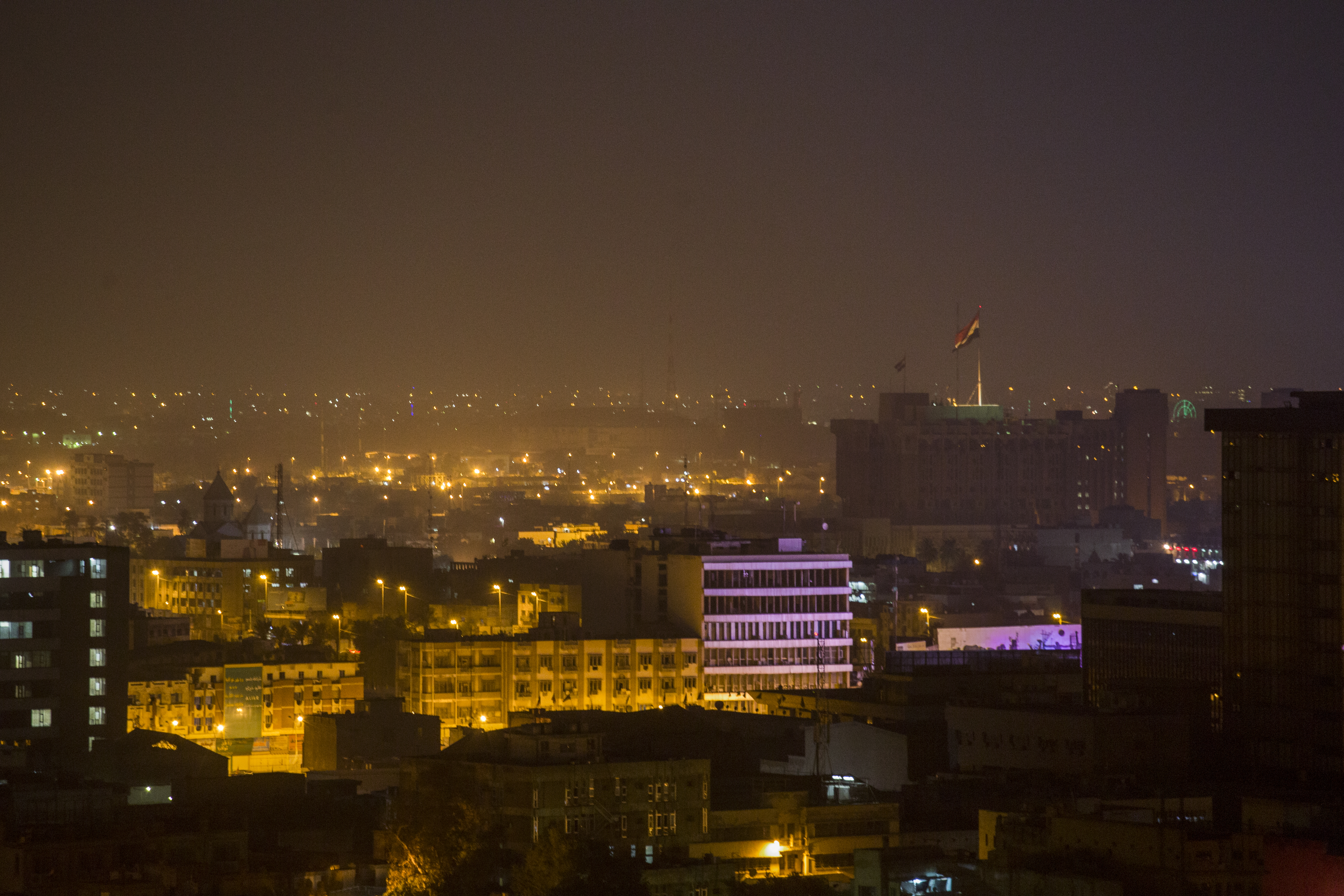
Al-Rusafa district of Baghdad at night

Iraq was one of the highly developed countries during the early years of regime of Saddam Hussein. Nearly 30 years of fighting, against Iran in the 1980s and the United States since 1991, has had a detrimental impact on economic growth. Oil production remains Iraq's chief economic activity. The lack of development in other sectors has resulted in 18–30% unemployment and a depressed per capita GDP of $4,632. Foreign aid for reconstruction has helped to bolster the nation's infrastructure.

Despite country's instability, Kurdish and Shi'ite populated regions of Iraq have experience great economic development. Specially in religious tourism in Karbala and Najaf.

=== Israel ===
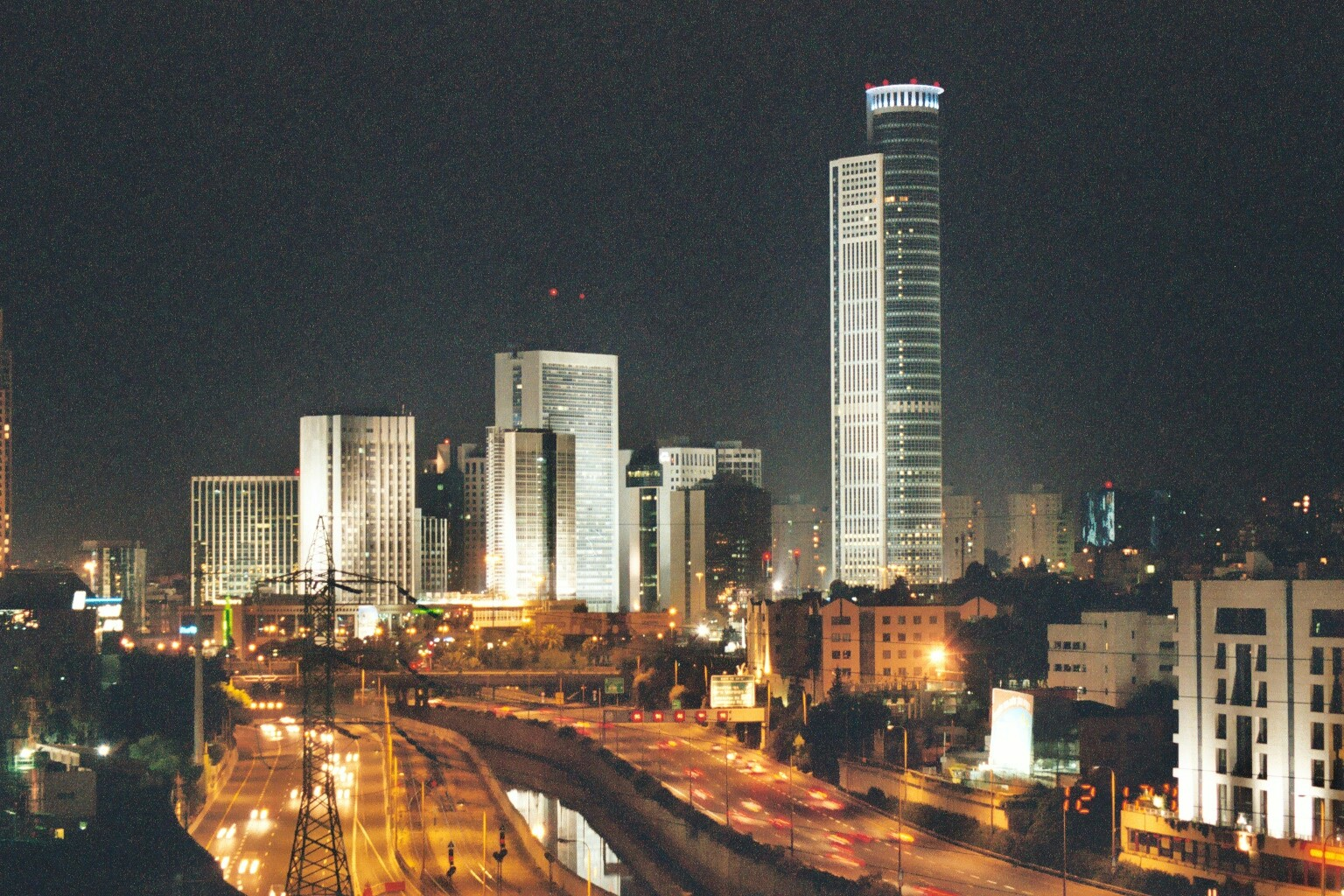
Diamond Exchange District at night

The economy of Israel is a developed free-market economy. Israel's economy allows a mature welfare state with modern infrastructure and a high-technology sector competitively on par with Silicon Valley. It ranks among the top countries in number of startups, and the fourth-largest number of NASDAQ-listed companies after the U.S., China, and Canada. American companies, such as Intel, Microsoft, and Apple, built their first overseas research and development facilities in Israel. More than 400 high-tech multi-national corporations, such as IBM, Google, Hewlett-Packard, Cisco Systems, Facebook and Motorola have opened R&D centers throughout the country. As of 2025, the IMF estimated Israel has the 25th largest economy in the world by nominal GDP, and one of the biggest economies in the Middle East.

The country's major economic sectors are high-technology and industrial manufacturing. The Israeli diamond industry is one of the world's centers for diamond cutting and polishing, amounting to 21% of all exports in 2017. As the country is relatively poor in natural resources, it consequently depends on imports of petroleum, raw materials, wheat, motor vehicles, uncut diamonds and production inputs. Nonetheless, the country's nearly total reliance on energy imports may change in the future as recent discoveries of natural gas reserves off its coast and the Israeli solar energy industry have taken a leading role in Israel's energy sector.

Israel's quality higher education and the establishment of a highly educated populace is largely responsible for the country's high technology boom and rapid economic development by regional standards. The country has developed a robust educational infrastructure and an effective business startup incubation system for promoting development of new technology. These developments have allowed the country to create a high concentration of high-tech companies across the country's regions. These companies are financially backed by a strong venture capital industry. Its central high technology hub, the "Silicon Wadi", is considered by some to be second in importance only to its Californian counterpart. Numerous Israeli companies have been acquired by global multinational corporations due to their technological innovation and personnel.

In its early decades, the Israeli economy was largely state-controlled and shaped by social democratic ideas. In the 1970s and 1980s, the economy underwent a series of free-market reforms and was gradually liberalized. In the past three decades, the economy has grown considerably, though GDP per capita has increased faster than wages. Israel is the most developed and advanced country in West Asia, possessing the 17th largest foreign-exchange reserves in the world and the highest average wealth per adult in the Middle East (10th worldwide by financial assets per capita). Israel is the 9th largest arm exporter in the world and has the highest number of billionaires in the Middle East, ranked 18th in the world. In recent years, Israel has had among the highest GDP growth rates within the developed world along with Ireland. The Economist ranked Israel as the 4th most successful economy among developed countries for 2022. The IMF estimated Israel's GDP at US$564 billion and its GDP per capita at US$58,270 in 2023 (13th highest in the world), a figure comparable to other highly developed countries. Israel was invited to join the OECD in 2010. Israel has also signed free trade agreements with the European Union, the United States, the European Free Trade Association, Turkey, Mexico, Canada, Ukraine, Jordan, and Egypt. In 2007, Israel became the first non-Latin-American country to sign a free trade agreement with the Mercosur trade bloc.

Since 2020, the inflation rate has grown relatively quickly in the span of 2 1/2 years, then having a slight drop in 2023. Due to the global trade tensions, and the appreciation of the shekel have slowed the export recovery that started around the second half of 2024 with an increase, then instability going into the second half of 2024. 28% of Israeli merchandise exports that shipped to the US, have a tariff of below 7% on average, while services that make up most of Israel’s exports to the United States, remain outside of the new US tariffs. The exchange rates appreciation since October 2024 is also reducing the import price inflation. The import of goods is also facilitated by the initial rule of “what's good for Europe is also good for Israel” according to the OECD report, where goods that meet the EU standards across the wide range of categories are also deemed compliant with the Israeli standards.

=== Jordan ===
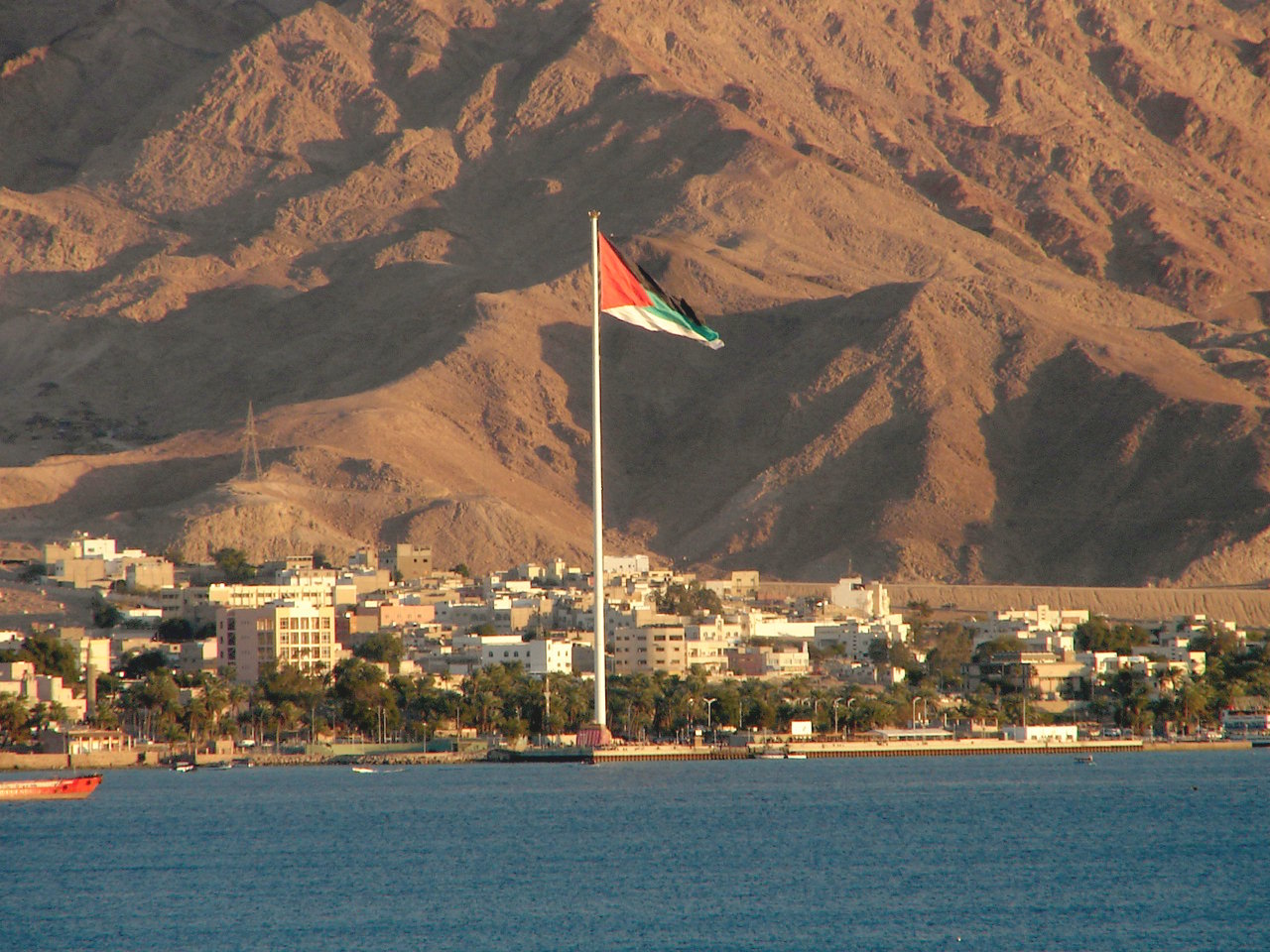
View of Aqaba

Jordan operates a mixed economy and derives it income from private enterprises and state-run public sectors. Among those sectors include tourism, financial services, and remittances received from expatriates.

As of 2026, Jordan scores a 59.4 in economic freedom and has an employment rate of 54.2% as of 2024.

Significant progress in Jordan's export industry came after an agreement with the U.S. to introduce Qualifying Industrial Zones, starting with Irbid in 1997. Further agreements with Israel managed to introduce more of these zones: the Al-Kerak Industrial Estate, the Ad-Dulayi Industrial Park, and the Al-Tajamouat Industrial City in 1999; the Mushatta International Complex and the Al Qastal Industrial Zone in 2000; and the expansion of the Al Tajamouat Industrial Park in 2003. Jordan also became the first Arab state to sign an FTA agreement with the U.S., following the U.S.-Jordan Free Trade Agreement (FTA).

=== Kuwait ===
Headquarters of Kuwait Petroleum Corporation (KPC) in Kuwait City

The Kuwaiti currency is the highest-valued currency unit in the world. In 2010 Kuwait had the second-most-free economy in the Middle East according to the Index of Economic Freedom. 57% of Kuwait's GDP comes from non-oil industry (mostly business services, manufacturing, retail trade, financial institutions, construction, transport and real estate). Petroleum accounts for 43% of GDP, 87% of export revenues, and 75% of government income. Kuwait also exports chemical fertilizers. The per capita GDP is $51,912. As part of a diversification plan the Kuwaiti government has invested its revenues and maintains a sizable sovereign wealth fund. In 2008 these investments accounted for more than half of Kuwait's GDP. 60% of Kuwait's work force are non-Kuwaitis.

=== Lebanon ===
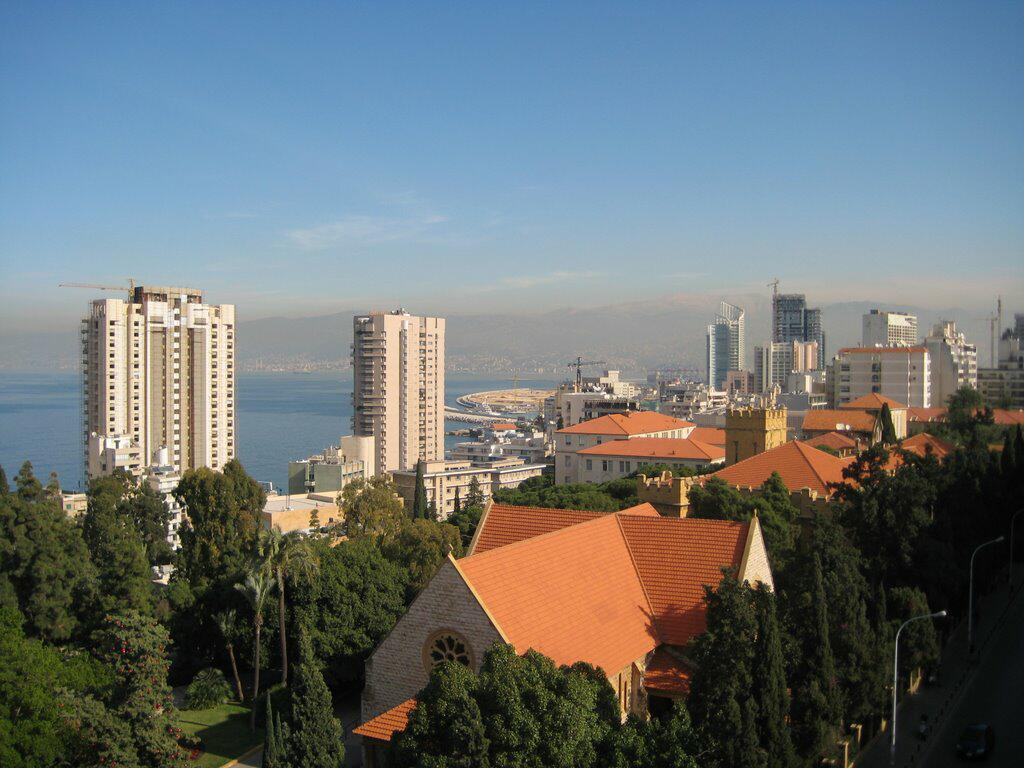
Beirut is known for its nightlife, religious and hospitalization tourism, and serves as a financial center.

The GDP per capita of Lebanon was $16,000 in 2012 US dollars. At that time Lebanon had the highest in GDP per capita after 6 Gulf Cooperation Council (GCC) state members and Israel, as per the CIA World Factbook. However, the economy of Lebanon had been severely inhibited by internal sectarian conflict and conflict with Israel. The government incurred significant debt attempting to rebuild the national infrastructure following the Lebanese Civil War. Through foreign assistance the nation had made strides to rebuild, but remained largely underdeveloped. Its trade deficit was nearly $8 billion and its external debt $31.6 billion. Lebanon's economy is being rebuilt, especially by the remarkable growth of its industry (including cement) and services sector which presents more than 70% of the country's economy. Beirut is regaining its place as a financial center of the Middle East with foreign investment returning in all sectors, encouraged by steady growth.

=== Oman ===
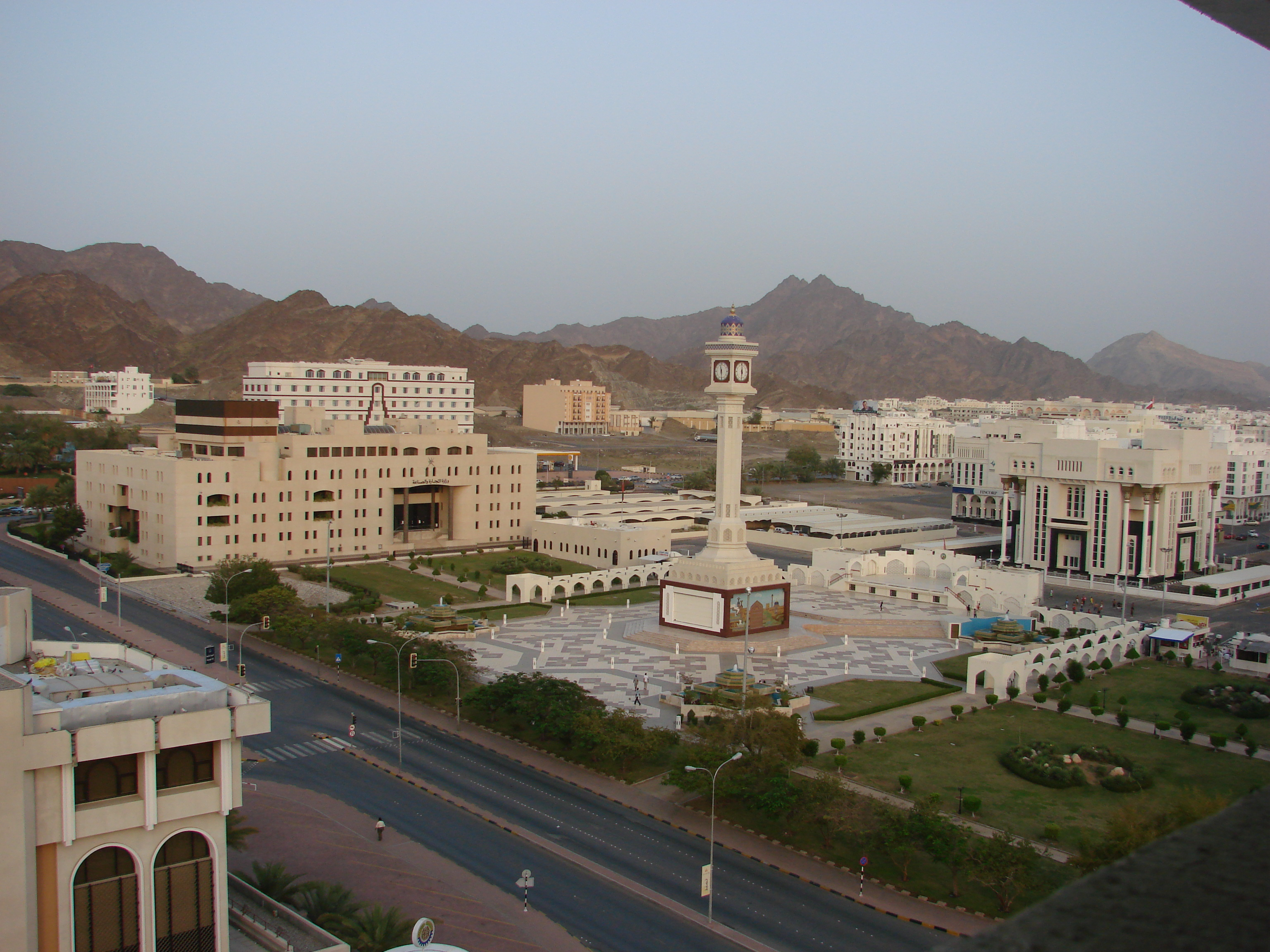
The Central Business District (CBD), in Muttrah.

Oman has several different industries including crude oil production and refining, natural and liquefied natural gas (LNG) production, construction, cement, copper, steel, chemicals and optic fiber. Oman also has substantial trade and budget surpluses. 55% of Oman's government revenues come from non-oil industries. Petroleum accounts for 64% of total export earnings, 45% of government revenues and 50% of GDP. By 2020 Oman hopes to reduce oil revenue to just 9% of its income. Along with that plan the country hopes to move away from rentier economics, employ its citizens in the labor market and reduce reliance on expatriate labor. To take its first steps in economic independence it has signed a Free Trade Agreement with the United States and is seeking to do the same with the European Union, China, and Japan. It is currently maneuvering itself into the re-export and heavy-manufacturing markets.

=== Palestine ===
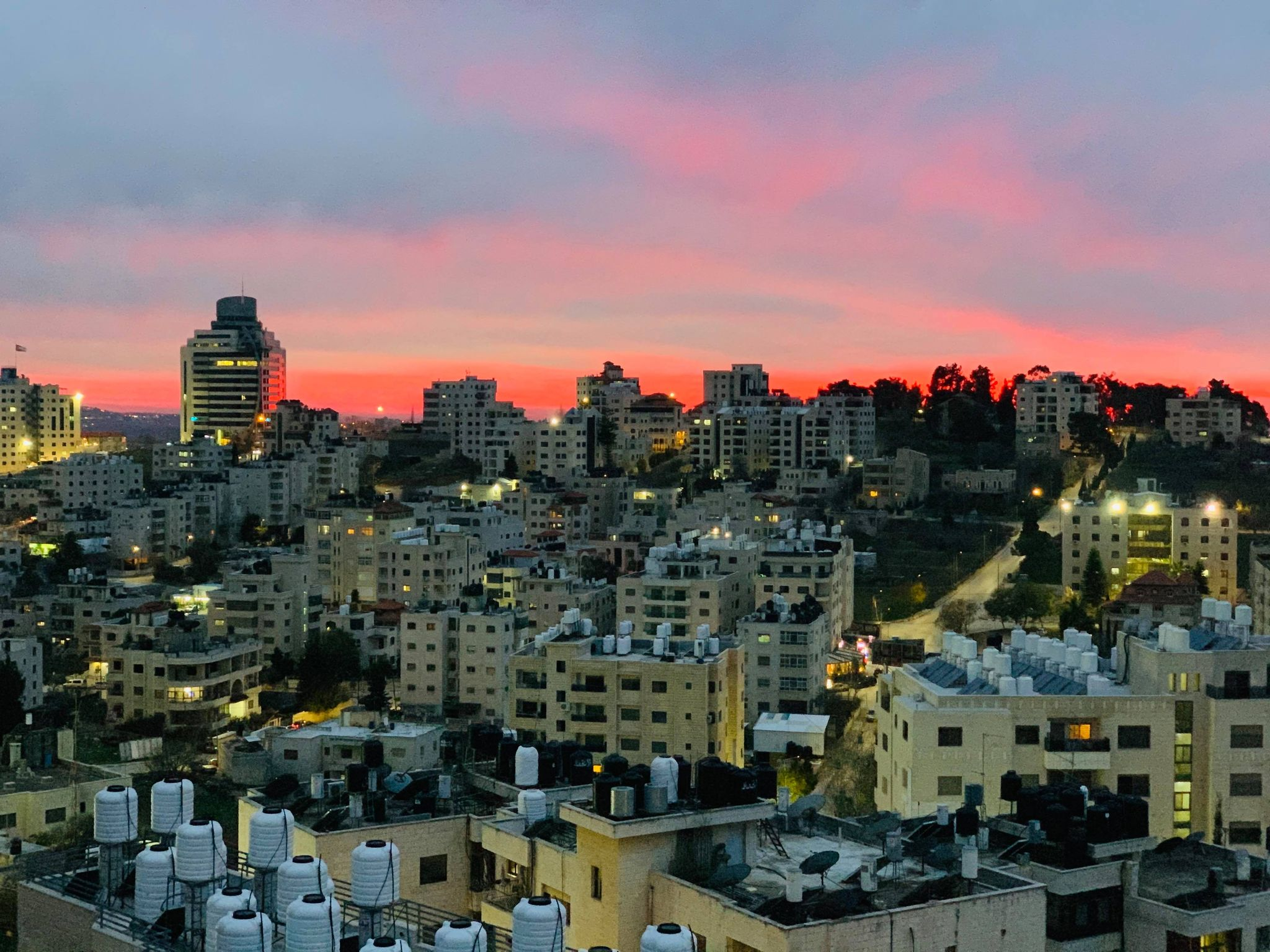
A photo showing sunset moments from downtown Ramallah

Since 1970s, Palestine had a favorable growth rate. The growth was higher than even Arab countries. For 30 years, Israel opened its market for Palestinian labor force. Many joint industrial parks were developed in borders of Israel and Palestine. Airports used to be in Gaza and Jerusalem which further supported economic development. At that time, even in disputed places of Jerusalem, many Palestinian companies had headquarters in the city.

Production has dropped since the beginning of the Second Intifada in 2000. The Gaza Strip has been blockaded by Israel and Egypt since June 2007 after Hamas took control of Gaza in the course of a conflict with rival Palestinian group Fatah. In May 2010, the UN Office for the Coordination of Humanitarian Affairs stated that the formal economy in Gaza has collapsed since the imposition of the blockade. The West Bank has fared significantly better since the split in the Palestinian power structure, and Fatah took power in the West Bank. The official GDP per capita of the West Bank was more than double that of the Gaza Strip in 2015. Palestine remains almost entirely dependent on foreign aid. Collectively, Palestine had a per capita GDP of $4,300 in 2014.

Since 2010, Palestinian reform have seen economic boom in West Bank and quite in Gaza Strip. The recent years saw a large-scale development of shopping malls, luxury hotels, technology parks and industrial zones. Though 2000 intifada had destroyed Gaza and Jerusalem economy. But it fueled the growth of Ramallah into a financial and technical hub of the country.

Massive oil and gas reserves have been founded in Palestinian territories. In 2000, natural gas reserves founded on the coast of Gaza Strip. Former Palestinian president Yasser Arafat lauded these reserves as a gift from God. This oil and gas reserves can fuel economic growth of Palestine.

=== Qatar ===
Qatar currently enjoys the region's highest per capita GDP at $128,000. It has derived its wealth using its natural gas reserves. With the revenues from its hydrocarbon industries Qatar has established a rentier economy. Qatar has also established the largest per capita sovereign wealth fund in the world. With a population under one million, the government has not found it necessary to diversify its economy.

=== Saudi Arabia ===
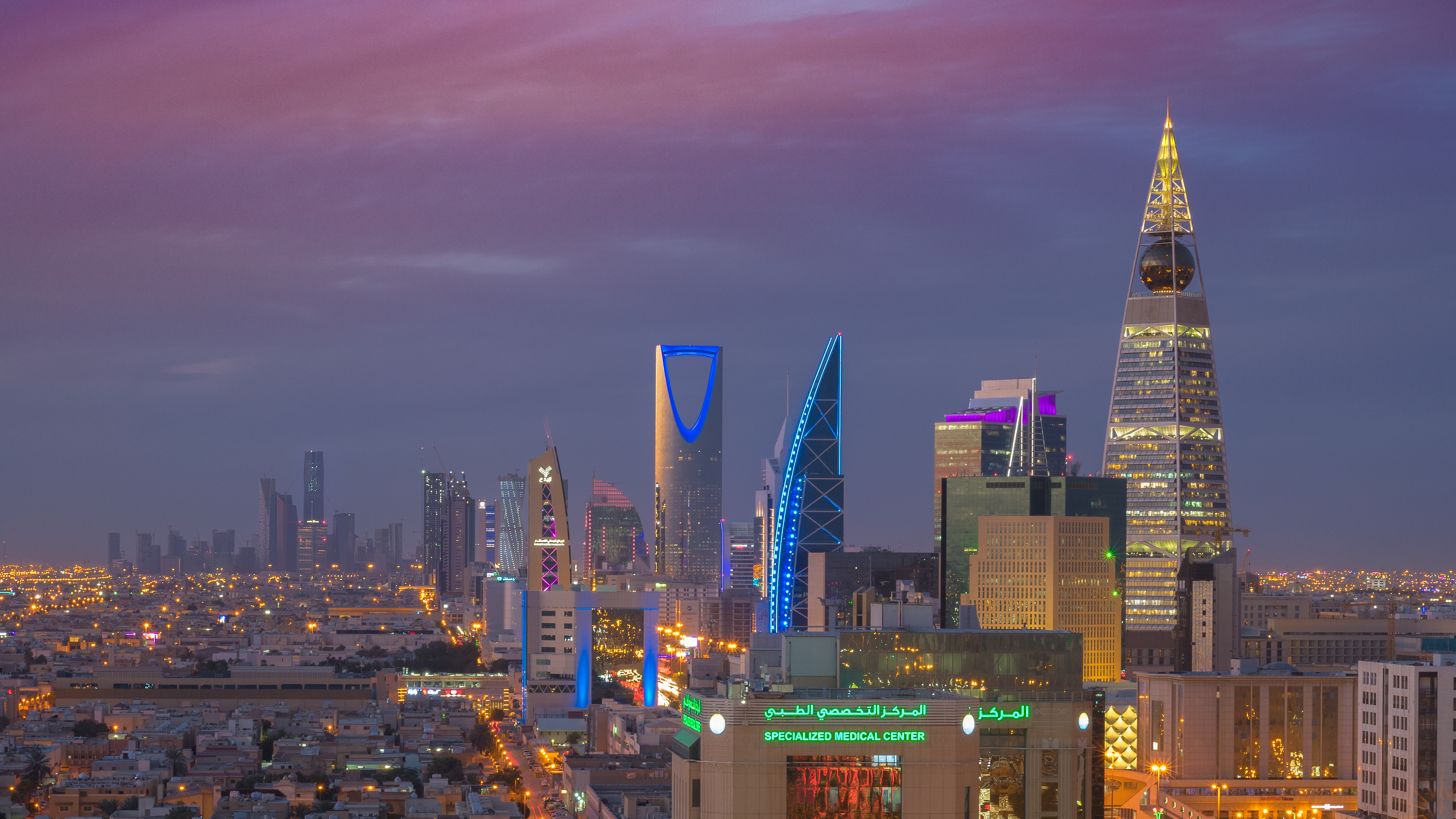
Riyadh, the financial center of Saudi Arabia

The economy of Saudi Arabia is one of the top twenty economies in the world and is one of the largest economies in the Arab world and the Middle East. Saudi Arabia is part of the G20 group of countries.

With a total worth of $34.4 trillion, Saudi Arabia has the second most valuable natural resources in the world. The country has the second-largest proven petroleum reserves, and is the largest exporter of petroleum in the world. It also has the fifth-largest proven natural gas reserves and is considered an "Energy Superpower".

The economy of Saudi Arabia is heavily dependent on oil, and is a member of OPEC. In 2016 the Saudi Government launched its Saudi Vision 2030 to reduce the country's dependency on oil and diversify its economic resources. In the first quarter of 2019, Saudi Arabia's budget has accomplished its first surplus since 2014. This surplus that is accounted for $10.40 billion has been achieved due to the increase of the oil and non-oil revenues.

=== Syria ===
Stemming from a 1960s nationalization effort most of the Syrian economy is run by the government. However, an inefficient public sector, significant domestic subsidies, and considerable intervention investment in Lebanon have led to significant problems of inflation and external debt. Consequently, the Syrian government has undertaken modest privatization reform in preparation for the opening of the Damascus Stock Exchange in 2009. Modest oil production and an agriculture sector lead Syria's production while most of its employment is in the service sector. Its per capita GDP stands at $4,900.

=== Turkey ===
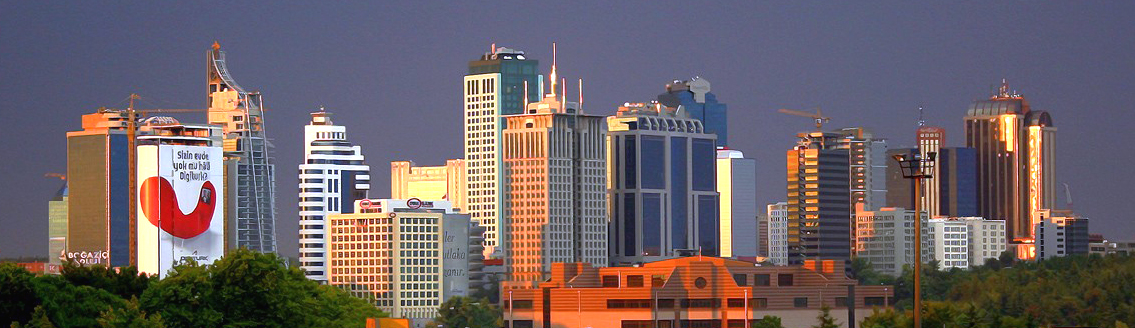
Maslak financial district, Şişli, Istanbul

Turkey is the largest economy in the Middle East followed by Saudi Arabia, Israel and the UAE. Turkey has the world's 12th largest GDP-PPP and 17th largest Nominal GDP. The country is a founding member of the OECD (1961) and the G-20 major economies (1999). Turkey has been part of the EU Customs Union since 31 December 1995.

Turkey is often classified as a newly industrialized country by economists and political scientists; while Merrill Lynch, the World Bank and The Economist magazine describe Turkey as an emerging market economy.

Turkey is restructuring its economy in an attempt to gain full European Union membership. It began this policy in the early 1970s, abandoning its previous import substitution industrialization policy. As privatization has taken hold in Turkey it has brought with it significant foreign direct investment. Additionally, the Baku–Tbilisi–Ceyhan pipeline has brought revenue to Turkey and enabled it to share in some of the regional hydrocarbon wealth. Turkey's economy is currently led by its automobile, agricultural, construction and textile sectors. It has a per capita GDP of $15,666, supplemented by some 1.2 million Turks working abroad.

Turkey's economy has been considered a regional success story in the past. As per the Turkish Statistical Institute, a government agency committed to producing official statistical data on the country, the country's inflation rate increased by 14.03% in November 2020. The statistics showed a 1.5 points increase as per the expected level; a 15-month high. As of December 2020 stats, the figures show a 2.3% increase in monthly consumer prices and a significant price rise in basic necessities such as food, beverages, and transportation. Meanwhile, the fall of the Turkish lira has been reported for years. Since the start of 2020, it has lost more than 30% of its value as compared to the US dollar and 30% against the euro.

=== United Arab Emirates ===
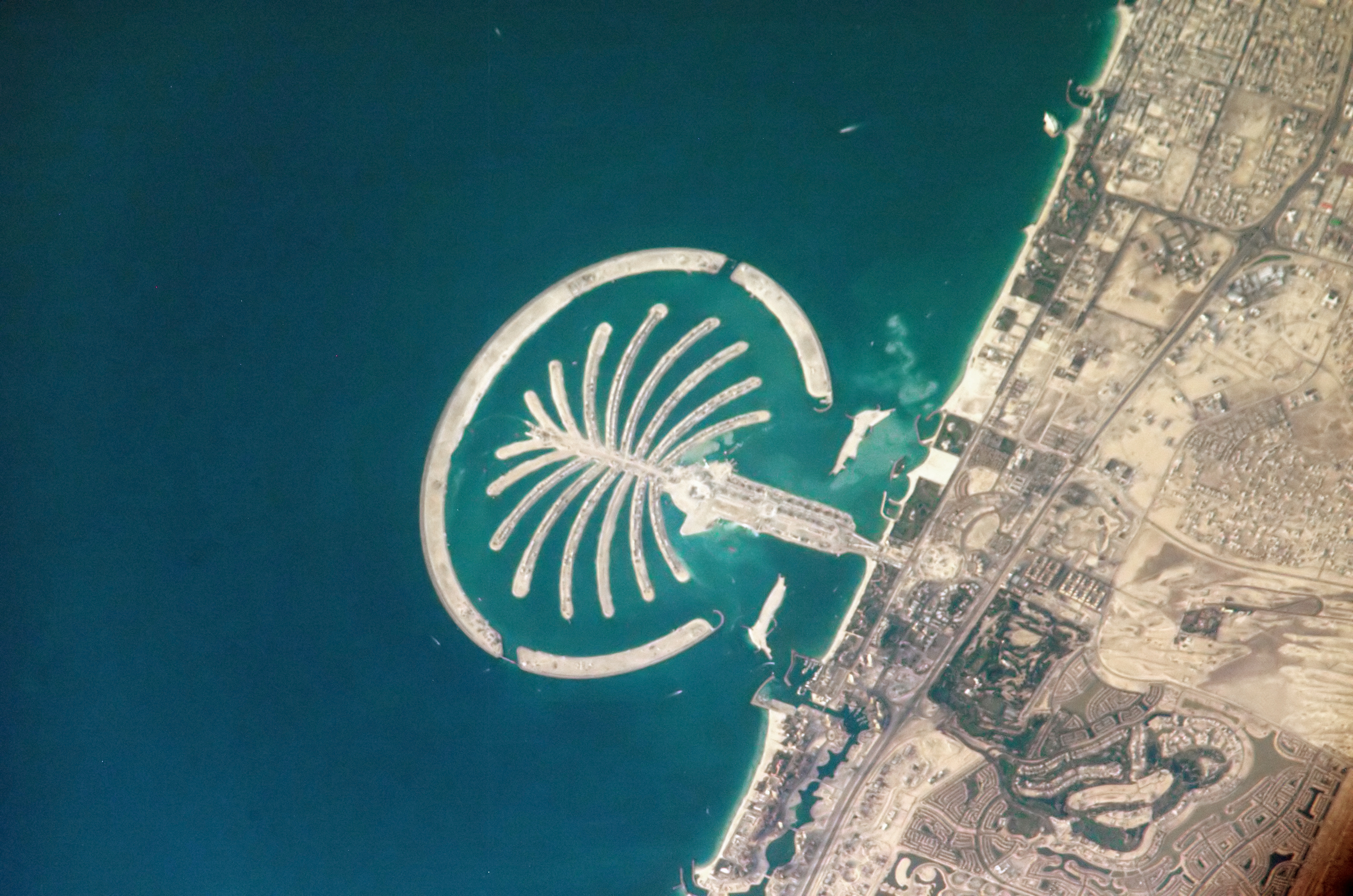
The Palm Jumeirah seen from the International Space Station.

The economy of the United Arab Emirates (UAE) is the second largest in the Arab world (after Saudi Arabia), with a gross domestic product (GDP) of $377 billion (AED1.38 trillion) in 2012. The United Arab Emirates has been successfully diversifying the economy. 71% of UAE's total GDP comes from non-oil sectors. Oil accounts for only 2% of Dubai's GDP. The UAE is also making an effort to attract foreign direct investment by offering 100% foreign ownership and no taxes. Tourism is one of the main sources of revenue in the UAE.

A rating agency, Moody's Investors Service revised its rating of eight UAE banks from stable to negative amidst the coronavirus outbreak. The eight banks included Emirates NBD, Abu Dhabi Commercial Bank, Dubai Islamic Bank, Mashreq Bank, HSBC Bank Middle East, Abu Dhabi Islamic Bank, National Bank of Ras al-Khaimah and National Bank of Fujairah.

The UAE cabinet introduced a UBO law in early 2021 after global pressure for financial transparency in the corporate sector increased. The pressure was sourced from the investigations carried out by the International Consortium of Investigative Journalists like the 2016 Panama Papers pushing to pass the Ultimate Beneficial Ownership or UBO registries. Following Dubai's increasing role in being a safe haven for the investment of illicit funds and provision of financial secrecy to people behind it – as disclosed under other ICIJ probes such as FinCEN Files and Luanda Leaks – has led to the introduction of the beneficial ownership law in the UAE. According to ICIJ, companies not abiding by the law and failing to report beneficial ownership information will have to bear administrative penalties and fines worth approximately 100,000 UAE dirhams, starting July 1, 2021. However, considering the lack of a centralized register to track all financial activities, loopholes, and exemptions in the UBO law itself, advocates believe that it isn't enough as a standalone to control money laundering in UAE.

=== Yemen ===
Yemen has suffered from chronic economic mismanagement. With 85% unemployment, the nation relies heavily on expatriate remittances. The reliance on foreign labor markets proved disastrous following the 1991 Persian Gulf War when Saudi Arabia and Kuwait expelled Yemeni workers and curtailed aid to the country in response to its support of Iraq. Most of Yemen's GDP comes from its limited oil production. The bulk of its labor is involved in agriculture where its primary cash crop is khat. On 3 November 2018 a British MP from Labor Party blamed Iran backed rebels in Yemen for the disastrous humanitarian crisis in that country. Graham Jones, chairman of the Commons Committees on Arms Exports Controls (CAEC) has questioned the British Government ‘s arm sales.

== Job index ==
The Middle East Job Index Survey conducted by Bayt.com in February 2015 stated that: Overall, the Job Index had decreased by one point since the last wave of August 2014. In the UAE, the Job Index had decreased by four points since August 2014.

Three-fifths of working respondents in the MENA stated that they would be hiring in the following 3 months. Plans to hire in those 3 months were higher in the Gulf Cooperation Council (GCC) countries (Saudi Arabia, United Arab Emirates, Bahrain, Kuwait, Oman and Qatar), with 37% 'definitely' hiring, compared to 30% in the Levant and 29% in North Africa.

7 in 10 working respondents stated that they would be hiring in a year's time. The plans for hiring in a year's time showed more positive results amongst the GCC countries, with 37% 'definitely' hiring after 12 months, compared to 30% in Levant and North Africa. 65% of those who planned to hire in the following 3 months indicated that they would be hiring for up to 10 positions. Over three-fifths (64%) of working respondents stated that their companies have hired new employees in the previous 6 months.

The trend continued from past waves with most employers planning to hire people for junior or mid-level executive positions. Accountants (17%) and sales managers (16%) were the top job roles companies expected to be hiring in the 3 months following the survey. Post-graduate degrees in business management were the most sought-after qualification in the MENA. This was followed by degrees in engineering and commerce. Good communication skills in Arabic and English were the top attribute companies sought in a respondent, followed by 'being a team player'. In terms of experience, managerial skills were the most sought, followed by experience in sales and marketing, and computer skills.

Overall, two-fifths believed that their country of residence was more attractive as a job market in comparison to other MENA countries. When compared to the Levant region (16%) and North Africa (19%), significantly more respondents in the GCC (40%) thought that their country of residence is a more attractive job market. Almost half of working respondents rated their own industry as being more attractive as a potential employer in comparison to other industries. Overall, banking and finance were first in terms of the industry which respondents considered to be attracting/retaining talent in their country of residence.

== Economic reform ==
Following the oil boom of the 1970s, Middle Eastern economies have implemented several reform policies aimed at sustaining economic growth and increasing participation at the macroeconomic level. The implementation of these economic reforms became more urgent in the region as oil price volatility threatened the economic stability of major oil-exporting countries. While each country follows its own economic agenda, many face similar challenges and target issues which affect the region as a whole. The policies are especially concerned with attracting foreign investment in an integrated global economy.

Countries within the Middle East have also begun implementing policies to promote integration between Middle Eastern countries. These are hoped to help the region reach its full economic potential and to sustain the stability of countries that have accomplished higher rates of growth and development.

=== Background ===
Following the OPEC embargo of October 1973, the market price of oil per barrel rose from $3 to $12 per barrel in reaction to the 5% production cut and reduction of supply by OPEC countries. The OPEC embargo was directed at the United States and other countries (the Netherlands, Portugal and South Africa), in retaliation for their financial aid and support of Israel during the Yom-Kippur War. The embargo was also prompted by the decision of President Richard Nixon to take the United States off the gold standard, hurting oil-producing countries which collected revenue in US dollars. While the OPEC embargo exacerbated the deep recession and inflation in the United States, the economies of the Middle East witnessed rapid expansion and growth in GDP as well as an increase in the Middle East's share of global world trade from 3.6% in 1972 to 8% in 1979. In addition to experiencing economic growth, the Middle East also made improvements in development indicators such as infant mortality and life expectancy, and a decrease in unemployment across most sectors.

Following the oil boom and the OPEC embargo of the 1970s, the Middle East became a heavily integrated region in terms of economic growth and employment. The increase in the export of oil by the major oil-exporting countries in the Middle East led to a mass influx of foreign workers from Arab and Asian countries. Towards the end of the 1980s the growth began to stop as the price of oil fell in an increasingly competitive global market. As a result, countries such as Morocco, Tunisia and Jordan began to implement economic reforms during the mid-1980s. Soon after, most countries within the region had implemented some form of economic stabilisation policy. During the 1990s the Gulf Cooperation Council (GCC) countries (Saudi Arabia, United Arab Emirates, Bahrain, Kuwait, Oman and Qatar) were becoming increasingly vulnerable to oil-price volatility.

=== Religious issues ===
For many Middle Eastern countries religion is heavily integrated into economic policy and has proved to be a major obstacle to effective economic reform. Religious instability in the region deters foreign investment and global economic integration. Political transparency has also proven to be a deterrence to economic development. Since the quality of institutions and governance are important factors in stimulating growth, economic reform in the Middle East may not be complete if religious reform is not suggested or implemented simultaneously. The political instability and continuous regional conflict (such as the Palestine–Israel conflict) prevents the region from achieving its highest potential as it consistently faces humanitarian crises that affect development indicators such as life expectancy and infant mortality rate.

=== Integration into the global economy ===
Another common issue that the region has addressed in economic and policy reforms is the integration of the Middle East into the global economy. Reports of economic reform in the Middle East in the early 2000s called for massive reforms to improve the Middle East's global financial integration as it stood below most developed regions. Such reports also called for a reform of the trade sector and agreements that had prevented most trade (other than oil exports). Noting trade openness as "a significant contributor to higher productivity per capita income growth", several countries in the Middle East have accomplished the common goal of trade reform and openness.

The integration of the Middle East into the global economy is greatly hindered by regional conflicts and global sanctions. In 2023, China brokered a major deal between Saudi Arabia and Iran to relax tensions between the two major powers and secure economic growth. After the Gaza war erupted in 2023, the region saw renewed economic difficulties. In March 2025, after Israel re-engaged the bombardment of the Gaza strip in failed negotiations between the US, Hamas and Israel plus even harsher sanctions against Iran, the stock indices of all major trading centres including Israel lost considerable value. Most Gulf States and Saudi Arabia have called for the creation of a Palestinian state to secure the prosperity and integration of Arab populations in the Gaza strip and the West Bank.

== Reforms in new age of the Middle East ==
=== Subsidy Reform ===
==== History of price subsidies in the Middle East ====
A common issue within Middle Eastern economies is the use of subsidies, of which energy subsidies account for the most. These price subsidies were first introduced over a thirty-year period beginning in 1940, and many of them began simply as price stabilisers. However over time they transformed into price subsidies. While meant to be implemented as a "social protection" or welfare tool, the subsidies were not adequately targeted nor were they cost-effective, defeating their primary purpose. They were not reaching the people who needed more government assistance, but instead benefitted a large portion of richer citizens. Subsidies had been embraced, often being the only social protection program in place, and several Middle Eastern nations came to see them as natural rights of citizens. This made their removal difficult, and pressure for their removal during the 1990s was lower because they accounted for a relatively small portion of GDP.

==== Pressure for reform ====
Following the 1990s, the pressure to reform price subsidies began to build as the price of oil steadily rose in the 2000s. It became apparent that price subsidies were preventing governing bodies from implementing needed social programs. Price subsidy reform became more tangible following the 2008 financial crisis, under which the prices of commodities rose, invariably raising the subsidies on these commodities.

==== Reform ====
Beginning in 2010, six countries in the Middle East (Iran, Yemen, Jordan, Tunisia, Morocco and Egypt) made significant reforms to their price subsidies system. Iran was the first country in the region to do so, and began by implementing major price increases on all fuel products, electricity, water and transport. This was offset by the implementation of monthly cash transfers of 445,000 rials per person. In terms of non-subsidised commodities, the prices of such goods also rose, with increases in price averaging around 30% and peaking at 100%. The cash transfers provided to citizens were found to be excessive and were disproportionately benefiting the richer citizens of the country. Due to the adverse effects of the subsidy reform, some portions of the reform were repealed in March 2012 under the newly amended Targeted Subsidies Reform Act.

Another country in the region that implemented subsidy reforms was the Republic of Yemen, which did so with the help of the International Monetary Fund and the World Bank in 2005–2010. During this period, prices periodically increased several times. In 2011 and 2012, increases in the price of gasoline, diesel and kerosene continued, drawing little public attention. However, the decision to remove all subsidies in 2014 increased prices by almost 90% for some products, drew public outcry and led to the reverse of some of these reforms within the year.

Other countries have taken different approaches, varying from extreme to gradual reforms. The effectiveness is dependent on many different factors such as the political climate during the time of the reform or whether or not the public receives precautionary warnings and advice in regards to coping with the removal of subsidies from goods and services. The reduction of subsidies in the Middle East is an ongoing challenge, but has developed significantly though there are often setbacks as they remain susceptible to changes in regime, political conditions, and socioeconomic factors.

=== Economic diversification ===
Middle Eastern countries have increasingly attempted to diversify their economies, particularly the oil-exporting countries. The countries of the Gulf Cooperation Council have addressed this issue and have taken a strong stance in the implementation of reforms. In order to decrease resource dependency within the Gulf states, reforms and policy proposals for the future have been implemented and follow a plan of economic development, signalling the move from natural resources to a globally-integrated diversified economy hoped to attract foreign investment. Examples of such plans to diversify include Saudi Arabia's Vision 2030 and the United Arab Emirates' Economic Vision 2030, each of which outline the country's goals to reach the desired level of economic growth and development by 2030.

==== Saudi Arabia Vision 2030 ====
Saudi Arabia's economic vision for the year 2030 outlines various goals that the kingdom hopes to achieve. One is the expansion of small and medium-sized enterprises (SME) to account for 35% of GDP, nearly double its current 20%. The plan outlines an allocation of 20% of funding to SMEs. The plan also mentions continued privatisation of "state-owned assets".

==== Abu Dhabi Economic Vision 2030 ====
Abu Dhabi (capital of the United Arab Emirates) has set goals for achieving an increasingly global and diversified economy by 2030, funded with the city's acquired oil wealth. Focusing on GDP by sector, the plan emphasises the link between economic diversification and economic sustainability. The Emirate is also concerned in developing the private sector within the city and states that at publication in 2008, that the ratio of small privately owned businesses to large businesses was on-par with developed countries.

=== Value added tax in the GCC ===
As of January 2016, Saudi Arabia and the United Arab Emirates announced the plan to implement value-added tax (VAT) in the GCC as a response to the decrease in oil prices beginning in 2014. VAT is expected to be effective in the GCC in January 2018, however some countries may implement this tax later into the year. The UAE, KSA and Bahrain have now implemented VAT leaving three GCC countries (Oman, Kuwait, and Qatar) to still implement VAT.

==== Implications ====
Though each member of the GCC will establish a separate national implementation of VAT, the implications of VAT on the economy are similar. First, the requirements for businesses operating under VAT appear universal across the region: all businesses that exceed the VAT threshold must register, filing periodic VAT returns with tax officials, and record keeping of all business transactions. Similar considerations are to be taken by businesses and governmental bodies. VAT may not apply to all financial services (such as services involving Islamic banking or insurance). Considerations of VAT on the oil and gas industry must also be made. The retail sector may also be adversely affected; retailers must be aware of the correct way to classify sales and implement retail loyalty schemes.

== History ==
=== Around 1800 ===
Textile production was the most-important industry, complemented by food-processing, furniture and some specialized industries. Industrial production was mostly concentrated in the cities. With exception of Istanbul, the cities themselves were all situated next to a substantial area of cultivatable land with soil quality. Most industries, with fixed price and guild systems, were not conducive to innovation, even if a certain quality of craftsmanship was preserved. Another important urban function was to organize caravan trade.

=== Early nineteenth century ===
During the early nineteenth century, the situation in the Middle East changed dramatically because of three development paths: mild reforms and problematic openness in the Ottoman imperial core, forced development in Egypt and direct colonization in central Asia and Algeria.

When comparing living standards, the Middle East did better than the Western industrialized countries in the mid-19th century. With the income levels and the onset of huge structural changes around 1900, an economic setback determines consumption behaviour and led to permanent changes in the nutritional status of the Middle Eastern populations. Therefore, the Western industrialized countries overtook the Middle Eastern living standards around 1900.

=== 20th century ===
Following a period of deindustrialization, political movements in the Middle East demanded a political renaissance and leaders saw the need for reindustrialization.

== See also ==
- Middle East economic integration
- Start-up Nation
- Economy of Asia
- Economy of Africa
- Middle East and globalization
- List of Asian stock exchanges
- Middle East Economic Association
