= All in the Family (disambiguation) =

All in the Family is a 1970s American television sitcom.

All in the Family may also refer to:

== Television episodes ==
- "All in the Family" (Body of Proof), 2011
- "All in the Family" (CSI: NY), 2008
- "All in the Family" (Dexter), 2008
- "All in the Family" (Married... with Children episode), 1988
- "All in the Family" (Supernatural), 2016
- "All in the Family", a 2000 season 6 episode of ER

== Film ==
- All in the Family (film), English title of the 1975 Hong Kong film Hua Fei Man Cheng Chun
- The Kid Sister aka All in the Family, a 1945 American film directed by Sam Newfield

== Music ==
- "All in the Family" (song), a 1998 Korn song
- "All in the Family", a song from the 2003 album Deuce
- All in the Family, a 2004 album by The Kinleys
- All in the Family (album), a 1995 album by Lordz of Brooklyn

== Other ==
- All in the Family (card game), themed after the sitcom
- All in the Family, a Sunday topper comic strip, illustrated by Robert Moore Brinkerhoff (1880–1958), which ran from April 3, 1932, to July 21, 1940
- All in the Family, a comic strip by Stan and Jan Berenstain which ran from 1965 through 1990 in McCall's and Good Housekeeping
- All in the Family, a 1966 novel by Edwin O'Connor
- All in the Family: Absolutism, Revolution, and Democracy in the Middle Eastern Monarchies, a 1999 book by Michael Herb
