= Giacomo Luciani =

Italian academic

Giacomo Luciani is a leading Italian expert on the geopolitics of energy often cited in the media. He is primarily known for his seminal contributions to the theory of the rentier state with Egyptian economist Hazem Al Beblawi.

== Background ==
He is an adjunct professor at the Graduate Institute of International and Development Studies in Geneva and scientific advisor of the Master in International Energy the Paris School of International Affairs at Sciences Po in Paris. Luciani is also a Princeton University Global Scholar attached to the Woodrow Wilson School and the Department of Near Eastern Studies. He is Senior Advisor to the Gulf Research Center. He holds a master's degree from Yale University.

In 2007-10 he was director of the Gulf Research Center Foundation in Geneva. He has also been adjunct professor of international relations at The Johns Hopkins University SAIS Bologna Center and professor at the European University Institute.

His research focuses on the political economy of the Middle East and North Africa and on global energy issues.
