= Hossein Mahdavy =

Hossein Mahdavy is an Iranian economist and political scientist known for rentier state theory. After Mahdavy's work on rentier states, rentierism became a common conception for analyzing some developing states like Saudi Arabia, Iran, Iraq, Kuwait, Qatar, UAE and Venezuela.

He studied at Oxford and Harvard Universities.
