= BAYT.com =

Job search and recruitment platform

Bayt.com
- Type: platform
- Industry: Recruiting
- Founded: 2000
- Founder: Rabea Ataya (CEO), Mona Ataya (CMO), Akram Assaf (CTO), Dany Farha (COO)
- Area served: Middle East and North Africa regions
- Website: www.bayt.com

Bayt.com is a job search and recruitment platform in the Middle East and North Africa founded in 2000 in Dubai.

The company has operations across 11 locations like Abu Dhabi, Kuwait City, Amman, Beirut, Cairo, Doha, Eastern Province, Jeddah, Riyadh, and Lahore, with headquarters in Dubai, United Arab Emirates.

== History ==
Bayt.com was founded in 2000 in Dubai. In 2001, the Arabic version of Bayt.com was launched Later, in May, the company opened three offices: Abu Dhabi, Riyadh, and Eastern Province.Bayt.com opened 2 more offices located in Kuwait and Bahrain to expand of the region's employment market, and in May of the same year, the Jeddah office was opened In October 2002, Rabea Ataya, CEO of Bayt.com, was awarded the 2002 Arabian Business “e-Entrepreneur of the Year” award and recognized by His Highness Sheikh Mohammed Bin Rashid Al Maktoum.

In 2003, Bayt.com set up operations in Iraq. In December of that year, the company launched BaytLearning, the region's first comprehensive online resource for training, seminars, conferences, workshops, and general facilities for employees and organizations. In 2004, the service launched expert CV and cover letter writing assistance. The service offers expert CV and cover letter writing assistance, from professional career consultants.

In December 2006, Bayt.com received the Sheikh Hamdan Bin Rashid Al Maktoum Award for “Best Website in the UAE” at the 2006 UAE Web Awards.

In July 2010, the service created the region's first online salary calculator. Within the same year, the company launched a subsidiary, Talentera, a cloud-based and on-premise human resource (HR) for small, medium-sized and large companies.

In 2011, Bayt.com was identified as one of the UAE's top 10 companies to work for the first time in four consecutive years and claimed double accolades at SME Advisor Stars of Business Awards 2011.

In March 2012, the company relaunched the platform with enhanced functions, a mobile application, CV builder, as well as, new job search tracking and CV-analysis tools.

In June 2013, the company launched an online platform for HR professionals with a similar to Linkedin functionality. In 2014, the company was selected by the World Economic Forum together with two other UAE companies (Al Hilal Bank and Air Arabia) as Global Growth Companies.

In 2019, the company released a new product, Evalufy, a candidate evaluation platform that uses AI video insights and customized assessments, to help recruiters find a worker.

In 2022, Bayt.com partnered with Mercer to create a software that enables employers to test more than 3,000 skills and learn exact salary information before making a hiring decision.

Bayt.com, together with YouGov, are authors in a number of researches in the HR and recruiting spheres.

== Products ==
Bayt.com Inc. launches products such as Talentera, a recruitment suite of tools to source, track, assess, and hire the best talent, that helps employers find suitable candidates; AfterHire, an onboarding software that helps organizations reduce employee turnover, achieve higher productivity, and Evalufy, a candidate evaluation platform with an AI suite of insights and analytics tools that help employers make data-driven decisions and understand their talent markets better.
