= Michael Herb =

American political scientist (born 1966)

- Born: October 7, 1966 (age 59)
- Education: UCLA; University of Washington
- Known for: All in the Family: Absolutism, Revolution, and Democracy in the Middle Eastern Monarchies
- Scientific career
- Fields: Political science
- Workplaces: Georgia State University
- Doctoral advisor: Leonard Binder

Michael Herb (born October 7, 1966) is an American political scientist who gained prominence through his All in the Family thesis of Arab monarchies.

== Biographical details ==
Herb graduated from University of Washington in 1987, earned his master's degree from UCLA in 1992, and completed his doctorate at UCLA in 1997. He joined the faculty of the Georgia State Political Science Department in 1998.

== Kuwait Politics Database ==
On his website, Dr. Herb manages a database on key political figures of Kuwaiti politics.

== All in the Family ==
In 1999, Herb published All in the Family: Absolutism, Revolution, and Democracy in the Middle Eastern Monarchies. The book's central thesis is that the main reason for the resilience of Arab monarchies is not oil wealth or the lack of a middle class, but because numerous members of the royal family hold key positions in government. The book has become a regularly cited piece in the comparative politics literature of democratization, authoritarianism, and rentier states.

== The Wages of Oil ==
In 2014, Herb published The Wages of Oil: Parliaments and Economic Development in Kuwait and the UAE, an analysis of Kuwait and the United Arab Emirates, both oil abundant states, have ended up on different ends of the spectrum regarding the concentration of political power. Some of Herb's findings have concluded that the role of the danger of an invasion from Iraq have had significant influence on the speed and to the extent that the Kuwaiti elites were willing to compromise political decision making power to civilians. The book has been nominated as "one of the best Middle East politics books of 2014" by the Washington Post's political blog, Monkey Cage.

== Books and articles ==
- "No Representation without Taxation? Rents, Development, and Democracy." 2005. Comparative Politics 37, no. 3 (April): 297-316.
- "Princes and Parliaments in the Arab World." 2004. Middle East Journal 58, no. 3 (Summer): 367-384.
- "Taxation and Representation." 2003. Studies in Comparative International Development. 38, no. 3 (Fall): 3-31.
- "Subordinate Communities and the Utility of Ethnic Ties to a Neighboring Regime: Iran and the Shi'a of the Arab States of the Gulf." 1999. In Ethnic Conflict and International Politics of the Middle East. Ed. Leonard Binder. Gainesville: University Press of Florida. 155-180.
- A nation of bureaucrats: political participation and economic diversification in Kuwait and the United Arab Emirates. International Journal of Middle East Studies, 41(3), 375-395.
- All in the Family. Absolutism, Revolution and Democracy in the Middle Eastern Monarchies, 130.
- Princes and parliaments in the Arab world. The Middle East Journal, 58(3), 367-384.
- Emirs and Parliaments in the Gulf. Journal of Democracy, 13(4), 41-47.
- The wages of oil: Parliaments and economic development in Kuwait and the UAE. Cornell University Press.
- Kuwait: The Obstacle of Parliamentary Politics. Political Liberalization in the Persian Gulf, 133-55.
- Monarchism Matters. Foreign Policy Blogs, 26.
