= Rentier state =

Government which derives all or most of its income from foreigners

In current political-science and international-relations theory, a rentier state (/ˈrɒntieɪ/ RON-tee-ay or /rɒ̃ˈtjeɪ/) is a state which derives all or a substantial portion of its national revenues from the economic rent paid by foreign individuals, concerns or governments.

The academic use of the term rentier states and rentier states theories (RST) became well known after the works of Hazem El Beblawi and Giacomo Luciani on the development of oil-rich countries, known as petrostates, in the Persian Gulf. They show that rentier states receive income without an increase in the productivity of the domestic economy or political development of the state, that is, the ability to tax citizens. The unequal distribution of external income in rentier states has thus a negative effect on political liberalism and economic development. With virtually no taxes citizens are less demanding and politically engaged and the income from rents negates the need for economic development.

As of 2020, rentier state theories were a dominant frame of reference for studies of resource-dependent countries in the Gulf and the wider Middle East and North African region, but were also used to analyse other forms of rentierism.

== Usage ==
The usage of rentier states is based on the concept of 'rents'. Rents, as defined by Adam Smith, are different from wages which must be labored for. They are based on the ownership of land or resources. David Ricardo defined 'rents' as a reward of the ownership of a resource. When applied to natural resources rents can be seen as "the income derived from the gift of nature".

In a rentier state the economy relies on external rents. Economies based on internal rents cannot be defined as rentier states, as they would require a productive domestic sector. In such an economy rents would only be a part of the total income, while in rentier economies rents take up a substantial part. Rentier states thus rely on external rents and not on the productivity of the domestic sector. This creates a rentier economy which influences multiple aspects of a state's society.

=== Origin ===
The first use of the term "rentier states" was by economists in the early 20th, century who used the term to describe European states that extended loans to non-European governments. Lenin viewed rentier states (Rentnerstaat), or usurer states, as a form of imperialism. He stated that a limited amount of rentier states, or creditor states, would accumulate capital through the export of capital to underdeveloped and politically dependent debtor states. According to Lenin rentier states were a "state of parasitic, decaying capitalism, and this circumstance cannot fail to influence all the socio-political conditions of the countries concerned".

The modern meaning of "rentier states" was first defined by Hossein Mahdavy in his economic analysis of the Imperial State of Iran. He defined rentier states as countries that receive on a regular basis substantial amounts of external rents. External rents are in turn defined as "rentals paid by foreign individuals, concerns or governments to individual concerns or governments of a given country". According to Mahdavy the payments for the passage of ships through the Suez Canal and the payments to countries in the Middle East to allow the passage of oil pipelines are forms of external rents. Also the revenues of the export of oil can be seen as external rents. Mahdavy denies the idea that oil royalties are a compensation for the extraction of resources. He shows that in the Middle East governments and companies are able to make larger profits through monopolistic positions and price fixing. He also shows that within the Middle East there is no significant relation between oil export and production processes of domestic economies.

The use of the term "rentier state" became well known through the works of Beblawi and Luciani. They expanded on the more economic analysis of Mahdavy by looking at the potential social and political effects of rentierism and focused on how rents were distributed and generated. According to Beblawi an essential characteristic of rentier states is the fact that only a few are engaged in the generation of rent (wealth) and a majority involved in the distribution or utilization of it. Often it is the government that is the main recipient of the external rent. It is precisely these characteristics that bring forth a specific rentier mentality. Different from conventional economics is that this mentality breaks from the work-reward system. In a rentier state income or wealth is gained not from productivity or risk bearing, but rather from chance or situation.

In rentier economies, high government transfers and subsidies often raise women's reservation wages, which can act as a disincentive for female participation in the workforce. Conversely, when these states face fiscal deficits due to low oil prices, they often reform fossil fuel subsidies, which can push households toward a two-wage earner model and increase female labor force participation.

=== Other usage ===
Rentier state theories can also be applied to nations which trade on their strategic resources, such as an important military base: Egypt and Jordan have traditionally extracted strategic rent from the United States given their regional geopolitical importance. Semi-rentier states, such as Kyrgyzstan and Tajikistan, rely on migrants' remittances or international economic aid. According to political scientist Gerasimos Tsourapas, states hosting forcibly-displaced population group(s), or refugee rentier states, may seek to strategically extract outside income linked to their treatment of these group(s), as in the cases of Jordan, Lebanon, and Turkey in the context of the Syrian refugee crisis. Building on international relations theory and work by Kenneth A. Oye, Tsourapas differentiates between 'blackmailing' and 'backscratching' refugee rent-seeking strategies.

Dependent upon it as a source of income, rentier states may generate rents externally by manipulating the global political and economic environment. Such manipulation may include monopolies, trading restrictions, and the solicitation of subsidies or aid in exchange for political influence or conversely the solicitation of loans in exchange for the reserve currency, e.g., the United States.

== Key characteristics ==
Hazem Al Beblawi suggested four characteristics of a rentier state:

1. In a rentier economy rent situations predominate.
2. The economy relies on a substantial external rent – and therefore does not require a strong domestic productive sector.
3. Only a small proportion of the working population is actually involved in the generation of the rent, whereas the majority is only involved in the distribution or utilization of it.
4. Perhaps most importantly, the state's government is the principal recipient of the external rent.

== Examples ==
The emergence of the new oil states and their increasing importance in world trade in the 1970s brought a renewed interest in thinking on rentier economies in the aforementioned disciplines of political science and international relations. Examples of rentier states include oil-producing countries in the MENA region including Saudi Arabia, United Arab Emirates, Iraq, Iran, Kuwait, Qatar, Libya and Algeria as well as a few states in Latin America, all of whom are members of OPEC, excluding the UAE, as of 1 May, 2026. African states such as Nigeria, Gabon, Angola, Ghana, Uganda and South Sudan are also important oil producers with rentier economies, earning income from trading natural resources.

Rentier state theory has been one of several theories advanced to explain the predominance of authoritarian regimes in the Middle East and the apparent lack of success of democracy in the region. While many states export resources or license their development by foreign parties, rentier states are characterized by the relative absence of revenue from domestic taxation, as their naturally occurring wealth precludes the need to extract income from their citizenry. According to Douglas Yates, the economic behavior of a rentier state

embodies a break in the work-reward causation ... [r]ewards of income and wealth for the rentier do not come as the result of work but rather are the result of chance or situation.

Hazem Beblawi has argued that this could create a "rentier mentality", while political scientist Fareed Zakaria has posited that such states fail to develop politically because, in the absence of taxes, citizens have less incentive to place pressure on the government to become responsive to their needs. Instead, the government essentially 'bribes' the citizenry with extensive social welfare programs, becoming an allocation or distributive state. The budget, in effect, is little more than an expenditure programme.

Moreover, because control of the rent-producing resources is concentrated in the hands of the authorities, it may be used to alternately coerce or coopt their populace, while the distinction between public service and private interest becomes increasingly blurred. There is, in the words of Noah Feldman in his book After Jihad:

no fiscal connection between the government and the people. The government has only to keep its people in line so that they do not overthrow it and start collecting the oil rents themselves.

== Outcomes ==
Consequently, in these resource-rich rentier states there is a challenge to developing civil society and democratization. Hence, theorists such as Beblawi conclude that the nature of rentier states provides a particular explanation for the presence of authoritarian regimes in such resource rich states.

Beblawi identifies several other characteristics particularly associated with rentier oil states. For example, where the government is the largest and ultimate employer, the bureaucracy is frequently bloated and inefficient – and indeed comes to resemble a rentier class in society. Moreover, local laws often make it impossible for foreign companies to operate independently. This leads to a situation where citizenship becomes a financial asset. To do business, foreign enterprises engage a local sponsor (kafil) who allows the company to trade in his name in return for a proportion of the proceeds – another type of rent. In addition, the oil rent leads to secondary rents, usually stock market or real estate speculation.

Rentier state theory foregrounds important puzzles in contemporary politics. For example, as Abulof asks, "If rents increase regime stability, especially authoritarian durability, why, then, are rentier regimes, particularly in authoritarian petro-states, more prone to civil wars?" Looking at the Middle East, "why have certain rentier states (such as Kuwait, Oman, Qatar, the Kingdom of Saudi Arabia, and the United Arab Emirates) remained so remarkably stable, while others (such as Algeria, Bahrain, Iran, Libya and Sudan) have become—either before or during the Arab Spring—scenes of violent unrest?" Abulof points to political legitimacy as a determining factor, and argues that authoritarian rentier regimes are in fact more fragile than they seem to be.

The crucial nature of oil has led to a situation where non-oil states have started to behave like rentier states. This can be seen for the region as a whole – so some states have been able to exploit location rent due to their strategic location, for example, as sites for military bases. More significantly, inter-state relations in the region have been affected as oil states try to ensure stability and tranquillity for their rent by buying allegiance from neighbouring states – in effect, sharing the oil rent. Beblawi highlights the case of Egypt whose receipt of financial aid from oil-rich neighbours declined significantly after Camp David, and money going instead to Iraq, Syria and the PLO who were considered more assertive.

== Criticism of rentier state theory ==
Giacomo Luciani, one of the original theorists on rentier states, criticizes the dominance of rentier state theories. These theories are often solely used to analyse resource-rich countries in the Greater Middle East to explain a multitude of outcomes. Such dominance was not the intention of Luciani:

Indeed, it has never been my understanding that the rentier state paradigm should be either the sole or the overwhelming tool of interpretation of the political economy of oil-producing countries. I believe that reliance on a stream of rent accruing directly to the state from the rest of the world is an important consideration, but surely not the only one.

Michael Herb criticizes the relationship between rentierism and regime type. Using a counterfactual measure which excludes the effect of oil on the economy, Herb shows that oil-rich countries fit the same patterns as other countries. He did not find a consistent support for the thesis that rentierism has a negative effect on democracy scores. Herb does however emphasize that rentierism is a distinctive condition that influences development.

== See also ==
- Debt-trap diplomacy
- Kleptocracy
- Rent-seeking
- Georgism
- Rentier capitalism
- Resource curse
- State capitalism
- Hydraulic empire
