= Foreign aid to Iraq =

Foreign aid to Iraq has increased to handle reconstruction efforts.

In 2004 the U.S. Agency for International Development was responsible for awarding contracts totaling US$900 million for capital construction, seaport renovation, personnel support, public education, public health, government administration, and airport management. The World Bank committed US$3 billion to US$5 billion for reconstruction over a five-year period, and smaller commitments came from Japan, the European Union, Britain, and Spain. Russia canceled 65 percent of Iraq's debt of US$8 billion, and Saudi Arabia offered an aid package totaling US$1 billion. Also, Iran has been accused of giving some monetary support to individual political parties. Some US$20 billion of U.S. 2004 appropriations for Iraq were earmarked for reconstruction. Effective application of such funds, however, depends on substantial improvement in infrastructural and institutional resources. Because Iraq's international debt situation had not been elaborated in 2005, for the foreseeable future U.S. funds are expected to pay for capital investments in rebuilding.

== Funding programs ==
- Development Fund for Iraq
- Iraq Relief and Reconstruction Fund

== See also ==
- United States foreign aid
