= Qualifying industrial zone =

Industrial parks

Qualifying industrial zones (QIZs) are industrial parks that house manufacturing operations in Jordan and Egypt. The QIZ program was introduced in 1996 by the U.S. Congress to stimulate regional economic cooperation. Goods produced in QIZ-designated areas in Egypt, Jordan and the Palestinian territories can directly access U.S. markets without tariff or quota restrictions, subject to certain conditions. To qualify, goods produced in these zones must contain a small portion of Israeli input. In addition, a minimum 35% value to the goods must be added to the finished product. The idea was first proposed by Jordanian businessman Omar Salah in 1994.

The first QIZ, Al-Hassan Industrial Estate in Irbid in northern Jordan, was authorized to export Stateside by the U.S. Trade Representative in March 1998. As of August 2015, there are 13 QIZs in Jordan and 15 in Egypt, exporting $1 billion in goods to the United States. Administratively, QIZs differ from free-trade zones in that free-trade zones operate in one country while QIZs have operations in two countries (Egypt or Jordan jointly with Israel) and are under the jurisdiction of their host countries in addition to U.S. oversight.

== History ==
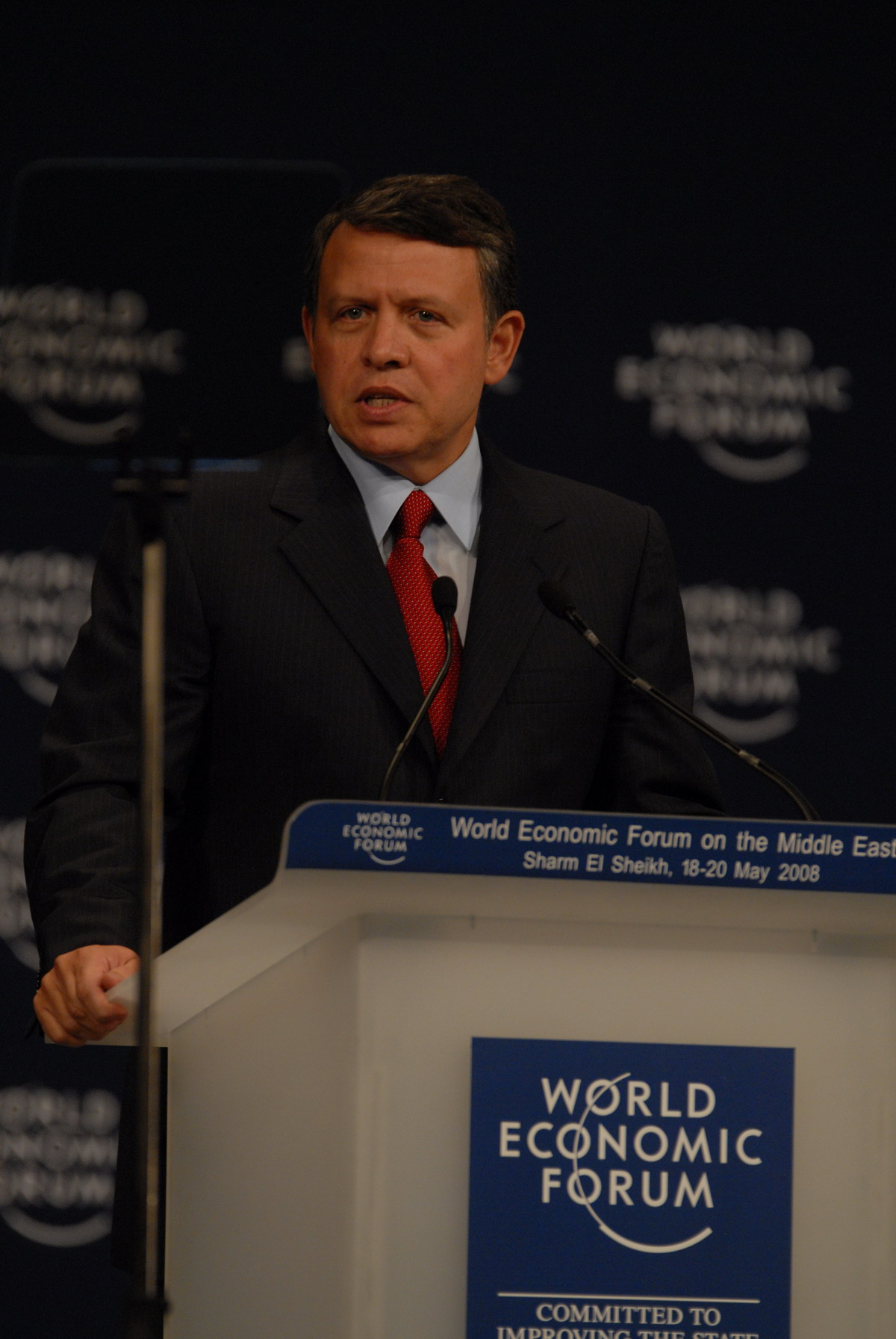
Jordan's King Abdullah's support was crucial for the success of qualifying industrial zones in Jordan.

The concept behind a qualifying industrial zone is credited to Omar Salah, a Jordanian businessman. In 1993, in anticipation of the Israel–Jordan peace treaty, Salah traveled to Israel with the intention of doing business with Israeli businessmen. He was also interested in business ventures that could take advantage of the eight-year-old free trade agreement between the United States and Israel that allowed Israeli goods to enter the US markets duty-free. After the treaty was signed in 1994, a business venture was struck between Salah and Delta Galil, where labor was transferred to Irbid in northern Jordan, to take advantage of low labor costs that were forty to seventy percent lower than in Israel. Salah had envisioned that by exploiting Israeli resources such as labor, finances, and contacts, and then leveraging it to produce value-added goods, the economy of Jordan would be benefited. In addition, he surmised that economic cooperation between the two nations would help foster peace in the region.

Salah set up a public share-holding company, Century Investments. Many Jordanian organizations criticized Salah for doing business with Israel and boycotted the purchase of output in Jordan. Despite the heavy criticism, Salah nevertheless received tacit support from King Abdullah of Jordan. To combat the boycott, Salah began to work with multinationals with a larger international stake. He then actively lobbied the Jordanian government to set negotiate a free trade agreement with the United States on the lines of the United States-Israel Free Trade Area Implementation Act of 1985. Faced with little enthusiasm by the Jordanian government, Salah scrutinized the Presidential Proclamation (No. 6955) that was part of the Palestinian agreement signed between the Palestine Liberation Organization and Israel in 1993. In the agreement, the areas on the border between Israel and Jordan were designated as "qualifying industrial zones", and goods produced here would not have tariff and quota restrictions to the US markets. Since the Hassan industrial estate in Irbid, where Salah had factories located, was situated far from the bordering areas, it did not qualify for QIZ status.

Salah then lobbied the Jordanian government to extend these regions into other parts of Jordan. Government officials were lukewarm to the idea and told him that it would be "naive to assume" that the United States would give Jordan this status. Unfazed by this response, Salah traveled to the United States and lobbied hard with the US State Department, the White House, and the US Trade Representative that it was in US interests to extend the QIZ into Jordan's interiors. Lawyers in the United States then told Salah that even if a small portion of Israeli territory was associated with a QIZ, the proposal might materialize. Soon, USTR officials began to travel to Jordan to work on the deal.

Finally, in 1997, an agreement was signed at the Middle East and North Africa (MENA) conference at Doha that established a QIZ agreement with Jordan. On 6 March 1998, the Al-Hassan Zone in Irbid was designated the first QIZ in Jordan.

After the setting up of the first QIZ, few Jordanian companies took advantage of QIZ benefits due to the general hostility in doing business with Israel. Instead, Chinese and Indian companies quickly took advantage of the vacuum to set up business establishments. The lack of local enthusiasm was criticized by the Jordan Times for missing the "golden opportunity". Gradually though, more Jordanian businesses began to set up business establishments as political hostilities began to be overshadowed by business economics. Soon after 1998, an additional twelve sites were given QIZ status by USTR.

Positive results from the Jordanian QIZ led to the Government of Egypt negotiating a separate QIZ protocol with the United States in Cairo on 24 December 2004. The protocol came into effect in February 2005.

== Regulations ==
Chart of the inputs breakup by country

Under the agreement (P.L. 104–234) requires that articles eligible for QIZ status must be manufactured in or directly imported from the areas administered by the Palestine Authority or another designated QIZ and meet the several conditions.

To quality for this scheme a product must be substantially transformed in the manufacturing process. Material and processing costs incurred in a QIZ must total not less than 35% of the appraised value of the product when imported into the United States. Of this 35%, 15% must be either US materials or materials from Israel, and/or Jordan or Egypt depending on the program. The remaining 20% of the 35% input must come from Israel and Jordan or Egypt. The remaining 65% can come from any part of the world. All importers must also certify that the article meet conditions for duty exemption.

Under the sharing agreements, the manufacturer from the Jordanian side must contribute at least 11.7% of the final produce, and the manufacturer on the Israeli side must contribute 8% (7% on high-tech products). Under the Israeli-Egyptian agreement, 11.7% of the inputs must be made in Israel.

The clothing and textile industry has benefited most from this arrangement. As tariffs on these goods into the United States are relatively high, exporters have used the duty-free benefits of QIZs to gain quick access to markets in the United States.

== Jordan ==
Location of QIZs in Jordan

On 6 March 1998, the United States Trade Representative (USTR) designated the Al-Hassan Industrial Estate in the northern city of Irbid as the first QIZ. Since then, an addition twelve QIZs have been also designated across the country.

Some of the QIZs in Jordan are:

1. Al-Hassan Industrial Estate
2. Al-Hussein Ibn Abdullah II Industrial Estate
3. Jordan Industrial Estate Corporation
4. Jordan Cyber City
5. Al-Tajamouat Industrial Estate
6. Gateway QIZ
7. Aqaba Industrial Estate
8. Ad-Dulayl Industrial Park
9. El-Zai Ready-wear Manufacturing Company

Jordan has seen a substantial economic growth since the QIZ were set up. Exports from Jordan to the United States grew from US$15 million to over US$1 billion in 2004. Government sources have estimated that over 40,000 jobs have been created with the set up of QIZs. Investment is currently valued at US$85–100 million and expected to grow to $180 to $200 million. The success of QIZ have led to the United States and Jordan signing a Free Trade Agreement in 2001 that was approved by the US Congress.

Between 1998 and 2005 Jordan moved up from the United States' thirteenth to eight largest trading partner among the 20 Middle-East-North African (MENA) entities. In 2005, US exports to and imports from Jordan totalled an estimated $1.9 billion: U.S. exports, at an estimated $646 million, were 1.8 times their 1998 level; US imports, at $1.3 billion, were 80 times their 1998 level. Despite the 2001 FTA between the United States and Jordan, 75% of Jordanian articles enter the United States through the QIZ program.

The apparel industry dominates both Jordan's QIZs and total exports to the United States, accounting for 99.9% of all QIZ exports and 86% of all Jordanian exports to the United States. The reason for this dominance is that QIZ products enter the United States free of duty, whereas, under the US–Jordan FTA, tariffs will not be eliminated until the end of the ten-year phase-in period, in 2011.

== Egypt ==
QIZ locations in Egypt: Green: Central Delta Region, Magenta: Suez Canal Zone; Orange: Alexandria Region; and Red: Greater Cairo Zone

After the WTO phased out quantitative quotas on textile in 2004 under the Agreement on Textile and Clothing(ATC). Egyptian textile and garment producers feared that their industry would be threatened by global competition from China and India. The flood of similar articles from these two nations to the United States could edge out Egyptian exports, and possibly result in the loss of 150,000 job opportunities. This was estimated to cost some of the $3.2 billion in US foreign direct investment in Egypt. Further, Egypt was in search of sources for increased economic growth and trade to provide jobs for its rapidly growing labor force.

Positive results from the Jordanian led to the Government of Egypt negotiating a QIZ protocol in Cairo on 24 December 2004 that came into effect in February 2005. USTR has designated three QIZs in Egypt – the Greater Cairo Zone, the Alexandria Zone, and the Suez Canal Zone (69 CFR 78094). On 4 November 2005, the USTR designated a fourth zone in the Central Delta region and expanded the Greater Cairo and Suez Canal zones.

The protocol signed between the two nations is a non-reciprocal arrangement and is expected to be a step towards the establishment of a Free Trade Agreement (FTA) between the two countries. However negotiations toward a US–Egyptian free trade agreement have recently been suspended over human rights issues.

The results have been positive. Israeli exports to Egypt rose over 30% from US$29 million in 2004 to US$93.2 million and exceeded US$125 million in 2006. As of 2008 ten QIZs have been set up in Egypt. Some estimate that approximately 20% of companies based in QIZs are wholly owned by Jordanians.

== Social impact ==
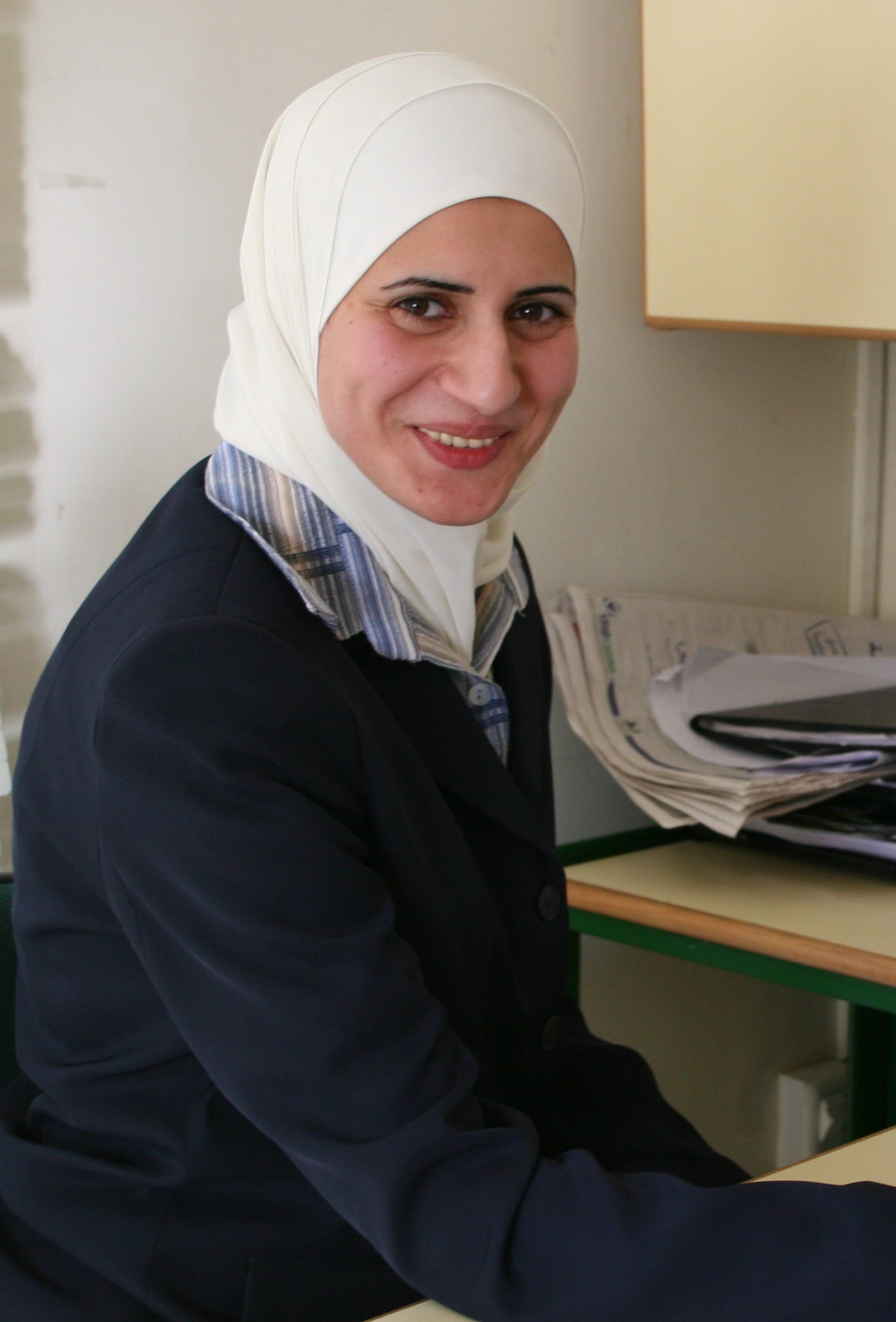
Women form a large part of the workforce in the QIZ.

Although most experts note that companies based in QIZs hire foreign laborers, thousands of Jordanians, particularly women from the rural countryside, have found jobs at garment factories in QIZs. In a traditional society such as Jordan, many of these women had little previous work experience and were largely caretakers of their home. Despite the low wages paid by apparel factories in the QIZs, some women have been able to support their families. However, traditional attitudes toward a woman's place in the home persist, and many families continue to prohibit female members from working in QIZs. (See Women in Jordan) In response, the Jordanian Ministry of Labor has worked to ease the adjustment of women moving from the home to a new job by providing free transportation to work, subsidizing the cost of food in QIZs, paying for dormitories near factories to cut commuting times and providing childcare. The long-term effect of female employment in QIZs are yet to be quantified, and there is some concern that over time, Jordanian women may have difficulty in achieving higher wages in a global economy where apparel manufacturers can easily relocate to cheaper labor markets.

When the QIZ program came into being in 1996, observers regarded it as a vehicle to support the development of peaceful relations and normalization of commercial ties between Israel and the two Arab states (Jordan and Egypt) with which it had signed peace treaties. In both cases, however, a tenuous “cold peace” continues to prevail between Israel and the two Arab states. Since the conclusion of the Jordan–Israel peace treaty in October 1994, large numbers of Jordanians, particularly fundamentalists, those of Palestinian origin, and members of the professional unions continue to oppose normalization with Israel and resist the expansion of commercial relations. With the establishment of 13 QIZs in Jordan, there has been an increase in the volume of bilateral trade, though the overall totals remain modest.

== Criticisms ==
By far the biggest international criticism of QIZs in Jordan is the humanitarian crisis within the factories. A comprehensive report by the Institute for Global Labour and Human Rights found that Sri Lankan migrant workers were subject to "routine sexual abuse and rape."

The United States Trade Representative (USTR) designation of 13 factories throughout Jordan (under the US-Jordan Free Trade Agreement) has led to disastrous realities, gender inequality and gender based violence:

"There are over 30,000 poor, mostly young women, foreign guest workers toiling in Jordan‘s largely foreign-owned garment factories sewing clothing for export to the United States. Under the Free Trade Agreement, those garments enter the U.S. duty-free.

"The guest workers are from Sri Lanka, Bangladesh, India, China, Nepal and Egypt. They earn less than three-quarters the wage of Jordanian garment workers, who account for only 15 to 25 percent of the total garment workforce. Jordanians earn $1.02 an hour while the foreign guest workers take home 74½ cents an hour. The Jordanians work eight hours a day, while the guest workers toil an average of 12 hours a day."

== See also ==
- Special Economic Zones
- Jordan–United States relations
